= List of breweries in Berkshire =

This is a list of breweries in the English county of Berkshire. The list includes both operational and defunct breweries, as well as microbreweries.

== Caveats ==
Some breweries, such as the Morland Brewery in Abingdon, were in Berkshire until border changes in the 1970s. As such, these breweries are not included in this list. Similarly, some breweries (such as the Courage Brewery) have, at times, brewed beer in Berkshire. As these breweries were not based solely or primarily in the county, they are not included in this list.

== List of breweries ==
| Name | Location | Established | Type | Status | Notes |
|---|---|---|---|---|---|
| Albion Brewery | Newbury | Unknown | Unknown | Unknown | |
| Aldermaston Brewery | Aldermaston Wharf | 1770 | Commercial | Acquired by Scrace's Brewery of Southampton in 1945 and ceased production. Acquired by Whitbread in 1950. | |
| Angel Brewery | Reading | Unknown | Unknown | Acquired by Morland Brewery in 1899 | |
| Atlas Brewery | Newbury | Unknown | Unknown | Unknown | |
| Bell Brewery | Maidenhead | 1854 | Unknown | Unknown | |
| Bickerton Sisters | Bracknell | Unknown | Unknown | Unknown | |
| Blatch's Theale Brewery | Theale | 1830 | Commercial | Acquired by Ind Coope in 1965 | |
| Britannia Brewery | Reading | Unknown | Unknown | Acquired by Ind Coope in 1896 | |
| Burge & Company | Windsor | Unknown | Unknown | Closed in 1931 | |
| Butts Brewery | Great Shefford | 1994 | Commercial | Operational | |
| Castle Brewery | Reading | Unknown | Unknown | Unknown | |
| Crown Brewery | Hungerford | 1854 | Commercial | Acquired by Adnams Brewery in 1932 | |
| Diamond Brewery | Newbury | Unknown | Unknown | Unknown | |
| Eagle Brewery | Newbury | Unknown | Unknown | Unknown | |
| East Berkshire Brewery | Maidenhead | Unknown | Unknown | Unknown | |
| Flyer & Firkin | Reading | 1996 | Brewpub | Closed in 1999 along with parent company Firkin Brewery | |
| Fort & Firkin | Windsor | 1995 | Brewpub | Closed in 1999 along with parent company Firkin Brewery | |
| Greenwood's Brewery | Wokingham | 1994 | Commercial | Closed in 1997 | |
| Higgs Brewery | Reading | Unknown | Commercial | Unknown | |
| Langton Brewery | Maidenhead | Unknown | Unknown | Acquired by Nicholson and Sons in 1902 | |
| Manor Brewery | Hungerford | Unknown | Unknown | Unknown | |
| Meux's Brewery Company | Crowthorne | Unknown | Unknown | Unknown | |
| Mill Lane Brewery | Reading | Unknown | Unknown | Unknown | |
| Mitre Brewery | Reading | Unknown | Brewpub | Unknown | |
| Original Brewing Company | Bracknell | 1997 | Brewpub | Closed in 2000 along with parent company | |
| Phoenix Brewery | Newbury | 18th century | Commercial | Acquired by Ushers of Trowbridge in 1923 | |
| Pineapple Brewery | Maidenhead | Unknown | Unknown | Acquired by South Berkshire Brewery Company in 1902 | |
| Reading Lion Brewery | Reading | 1995 | Brewpub | Closed in 2001 | |
| Royal Brewery | Windsor | Unknown | Unknown | Unknown | |
| St Nicholas Brewery | Newbury | Unknown | Unknown | Acquired by South Berkshire Brewery Company in 1902 | |
| Simonds' Brewery | Reading | 1785 | Commercial | Merged with Courage Brewery in 1960 | |
| Siren Craft Brew | Finchampstead | 2013 | Commercial | Independent | |
| Thames Brewery | Maidenhead | Unknown | Unknown | Demolished and re-established as Bell Brewery in 1854 | |
| Thatcham Brewery | Thatcham | Unknown | Unknown | Unknown | |
| Tudor Brewing Company | Reading | 1999 | Brewpub | Closed in 2000 | |
| Two Bridges Brewery | Caversham | 2009 | Commercial | Closed | |
| Victoria Brewery | Reading | Unknown | Brewpub | Acquired by Courage, Barclay & Simonds c. 1900 | |
| West Berkshire Brewery | Yattendon | 1995 | Commercial | Operational | |
| Windsor and Eton Brewing Company | Windsor | 2010 | Commercial | Operational | |
| Windsor Brewery | Windsor | Unknown | Unknown | Unknown | |
| Zero Degrees | Reading | 2007 | Brewpub | Operational | |

== See also ==
- Beer in England
- List of breweries in England
