= Downtown Honolulu =

- Central business district
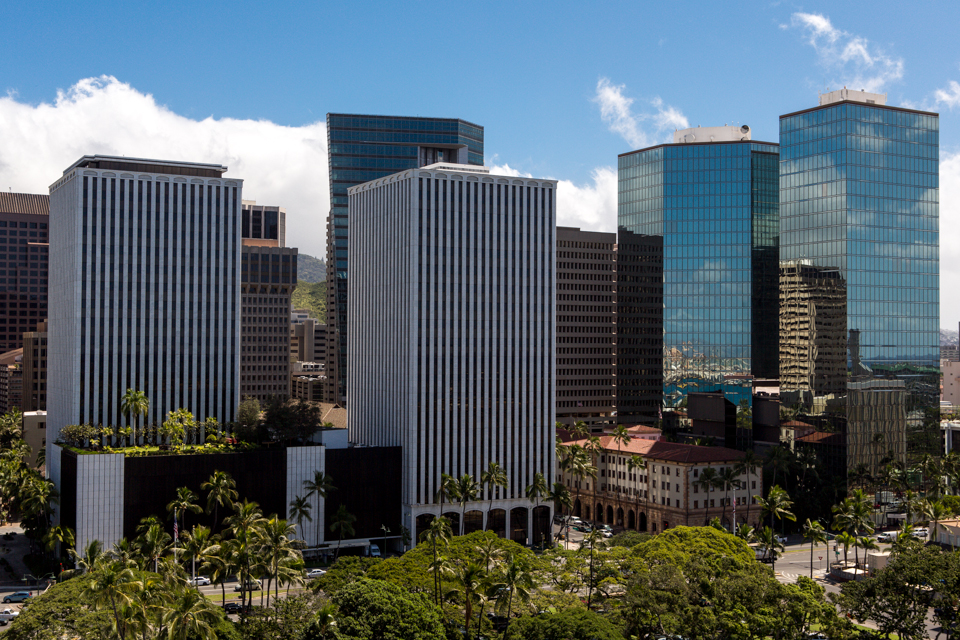
- A view of downtown Honolulu from atop Aloha Tower

- Location within Oahu Location within Hawaii
- Coordinates: 21°18′12″N 157°51′26″W
- Country: United States
- State: Hawaii
- City: Honolulu

Downtown Honolulu is the current historic, economic, and governmental center of Honolulu, the capital and largest city of the U.S. state of Hawaii. It is bounded by Nuʻuanu Stream to the west, Ward Avenue to the east, Vineyard Boulevard to the north, and Honolulu Harbor to the south. Both modern and historic buildings and complexes are located in the area, with many of the latter declared National Historic Landmarks on the National Register of Historic Places.

== Districts ==
Downtown Honolulu can be subdivided into four neighborhoods, each with its own central focus and mix of buildings. These areas are the Capitol District, the Central Business District, Chinatown, and the Waterfront.

=== Capitol District ===
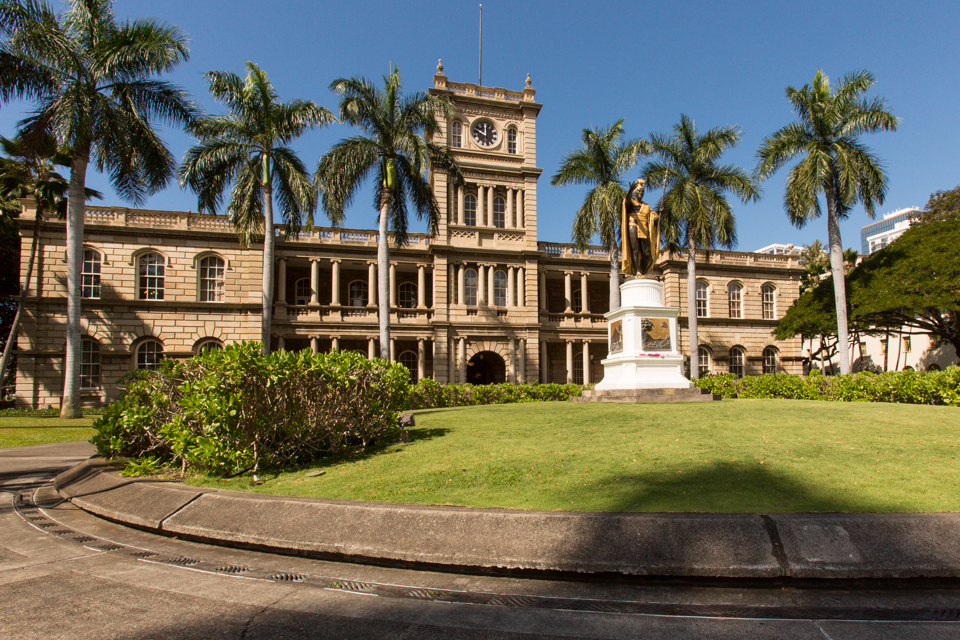
The iconic Aliʻiōlani Hale in the Capitol District of Honolulu

The Capitol District, or Civic Center, contains most of the federal, state, and city governmental buildings and is centered on the Hawaiʻi State Capitol, ʻIolani Palace, and Honolulu Hale (city hall). It is roughly bounded by Richards Street on the west, Ward Avenue on the east, Vineyard Boulevard to the north, and Nimitz Highway to the south. Significant buildings in this area include:

- Alapai Transit Center
- Old Advertiser Building
- Aliʻiōlani Hale
- Bishop Estate Building
- Frank F. Fasi Municipal Building
- Hawaiʻi State Capitol
- Hawaiʻi State Library
- Honolulu Fire Department Headquarters
- Honolulu Hale
- Honolulu Police Department Headquarters
- ʻIolani Barracks
- ʻIolani Palace
- Kakaʻako Fire Station
- Kalanimoku Building
- Kamehameha V Post Office
- Kawaiahaʻo Church
- Kawaiahaʻo Plaza
- King Kalakaua Building
- Kapuaiwa Building
- Leiopapa a Kamehameha Building
- Mission Memorial Building
- The Pacific Club
- The Queen's Medical Center
- Prince Kūhiō Kalanianaʻole Federal Building
- Territorial Building
- Washington Place
- Kaʻākaukukui Skyline Station (opens in 2031)

=== Central Business District ===
Centered on Bishop Street and Fort Street Mall, the central business district is roughly bounded by Nuʻuanu Avenue, Nimitz Highway, Richards Street, and Vineyard Boulevard. This area contains most of the headquarters buildings of Hawaiʻi-based companies and most of the skyscrapers. Buildings in this area include:

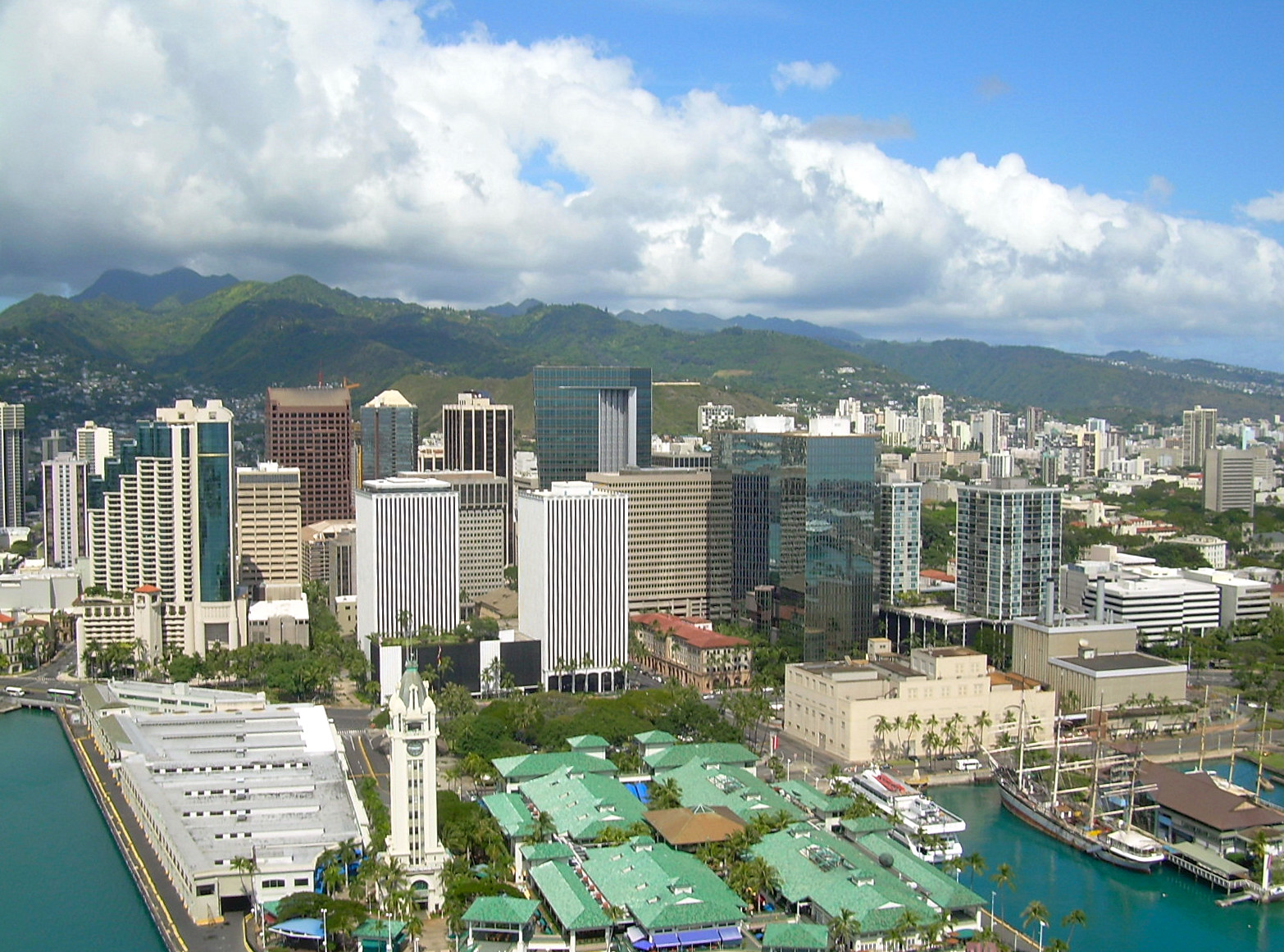
An aerial view of downtown Honolulu, Hawaiʻi taken on April 7, 2007. In the foreground is Aloha Tower, a clock tower and lighthouse greeting visitors to Honolulu Harbor since 1926. In the center of the photo is First Hawaiʻian Center, the second tallest building and oldest bank in Hawaiʻi. In the lower right is the Falls of Clyde, the only surviving iron-hulled, four-masted full rigged ship, and the only surviving sail-driven oil tanker in the world. The Falls of Clyde is now a museum ship in Honolulu Harbor.

- 1100 Alakea Street
- 1132 Bishop Street
- Alexander & Baldwin Building
- Ali'i Place
- American Savings Building
- Arcade Building
- Armstrong Building
- Army and Navy YMCA
- Bishop Bank Building
- Bishop Square
- Cades Schutte Building
- Capitol Place
- Cathedral Church of Saint Andrew
- Cathedral of Our Lady of Peace
- C. Brewer Building
- Central Fire Station
- Central Pacific Plaza (Central Pacific Bank)
- Century Square
- City Financial Tower
- Davies Pacific Center
- Dillingham Transportation Building
- Executive Center
- Financial Plaza of the Pacific (Bank of Hawaii)
- Finance Factors Center
- First Hawaiian Center
- Fort Street Mall
- Harbor Court
- Hawaiʻi Pacific University
- Hawaiian Electric Building
- Hawaiian Telcom Building
- Judd Building
- Princess Ruth Keʻelikōlani Middle School
- McCandless Building
- Melchers Building
- Oʻahu Railway and Land Terminal
- Oceanit Center
- Pacific Guardian Center
- Pinnacle Honolulu
- Pioneer Plaza
- Royal Brewery
- Stangenwald Building
- Theo H. Davies Building
- TOPA Financial Tower
- Yokohama Specie Bank
- YWCA Building
- Kuloloia Skyline Station (opens in 2031)

=== Chinatown ===
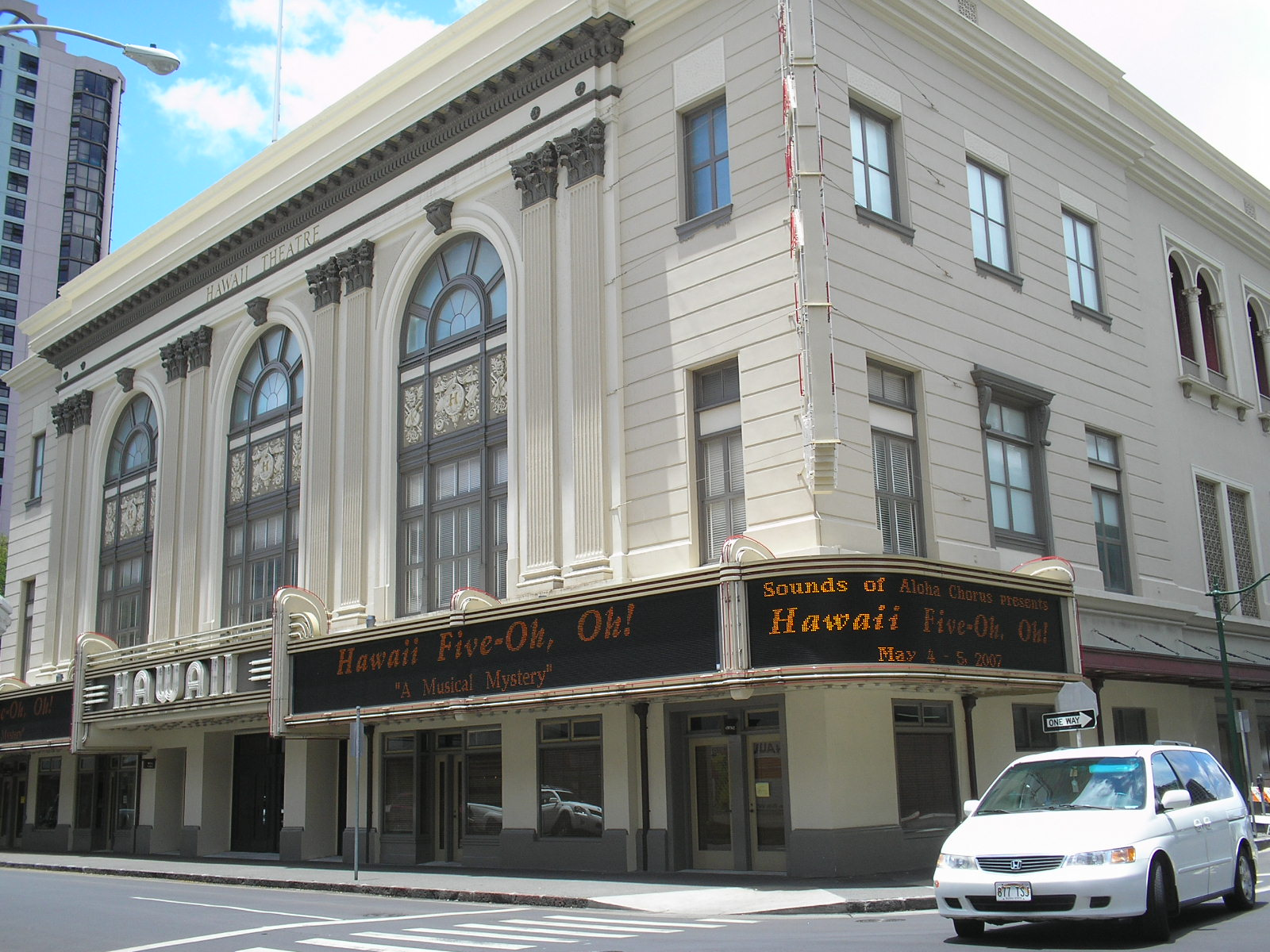
Hawaiʻi Theatre

Located between Nuʻuanu Stream and Nuʻuanu Avenue, Chinatown at one time was the center of Chinese cultural contact on the island. Central to this area is the open-air Oʻahu Market. The area around Nuʻuanu Avenue has become an Arts District, thanks to the renovation of the Hawaiʻi Theatre. Buildings in this area include:

- Hawaiʻi Theatre
- Lum Yip Kee Building
- Nippu Jiji Building
- Oʻahu Market
- Wo Fat Building
- Hōlau Skyline Station (opens in 2031)

=== Waterfront ===
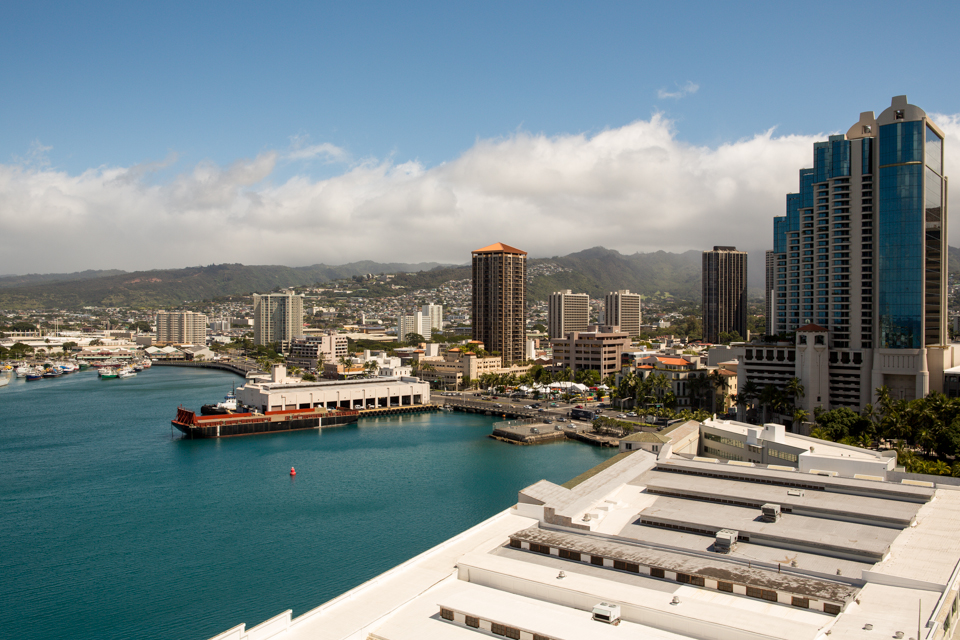
The Waterfront District of Honolulu with Harbor Court on the far right.

Honolulu's waterfront area centers on Aloha Tower, which was once the tallest building in Hawaiʻi and where cruise ships would dock before the advent of air travel between Hawaiʻi and the U.S. Mainland. Recently, cruise ships between the Hawaiian Islands now dock at Honolulu Harbor. Buildings in this area include:

- Aloha Tower
- Falls of Clyde
- Hawaiʻi Maritime Center
- Honolulu Foreign Trade Zone
- Kuloloia Skyline Station (opens in 2031)

== Government and infrastructure ==
The Honolulu Police Department operates the Alapai Police Headquarters and the Downtown Police Station in Downtown Honolulu.

The United States Postal Service operates the Downtown Honolulu Post Office at 335 Merchant Street.

The Skyline rail system is planning to connect Downtown Honolulu with a Chinatown station, a Downtown station near the Aloha Tower, and a Civic Center station in the Capitol District. These stations are planned to open in 2031.

== See also ==
- List of tallest buildings in Honolulu
