= Hawaii National Bank =

Privately held community bank in Hawaii, US

- Type: Private
- Industry: Finance and Insurance
- Founded: 1960
- Headquarters: Honolulu, Hawaii
- Key people: Warren K.K. Luke, Chairman; Bryan Luke, President & CEO
- Products: Banking
- Total assets: $863,001,000 (2025)
- Website: www.hawaiinational.bank

Hawaii National Bank is a privately held community bank, with branch offices in Hilo, Hawai'i, Oahu, and Maui. The bank was established on September 19, 1960, in the Chinatown neighborhood of downtown Honolulu. It has $883 million in assets as of March 31, 2026.

In 1997, Hawaii National Bank had the highest percentage of small business loans (defined as loans of less than $ 250,000) of all the commercial banks in Hawaii. Further, in a report by the Office of Advocacy of the United States Small Business Administration, the bank was recognized as being the "most friendly" lender to small business in its asset size in Hawaii. The bank is also a is a certified participant in the Minority Bank Deposit Program administered by the United States Department of the Treasury Financial Management Service.
