= Arts District (Honolulu) =

Coordinates: 21°18′39″N 157°51′43″W

The Arts District is a neighborhood in Honolulu located west of downtown Honolulu's Hawaii Capital Historic District and on the eastern edge of Chinatown. It spans just over 12 blocks, bounded by Bethel and Smith Streets and Nimitz Highway and Beretania Street.

It is home to cultural institutions, performing arts venues (including the historic Hawaii Theatre), galleries, and arts events. The Merchant Street Historic District is just to the south.
