= Bartholomew Street =

Thoroughfare in Newbury, Berkshire, England

- Length: 0.46 mi (0.74 km)
- North end: Bridge Street
- Major junctions: Mansion House Street; West Mills; Market Street; Craven Road; St Michaels Road; Black Boys Bridge; Station Road; Pound Street
- South end: A343

Bartholomew Street is a major thoroughfare in Newbury, Berkshire, England.

== Geography ==
Bartholomew Street runs from the A343 at the south end to Newbury Bridge (over the River Kennet) at the north end. Points of interest on the street include the Black Boys Bridge (adjacent to Newbury railway station), the Phoenix Brewery, the Kennet Centre, and St Nicolas Church, Newbury.

28 Bartholomew Street is a grade II* listed building.

Just south of the Kennet bridge, the section of the road bordering the Kennet Centre (measuring 240 metres (790 ft)) is pedestrianised.
