= Dreweatt's Lock =

Canal lock in Berkshire, England

Coordinates: 51.40325°N 1.41054°W

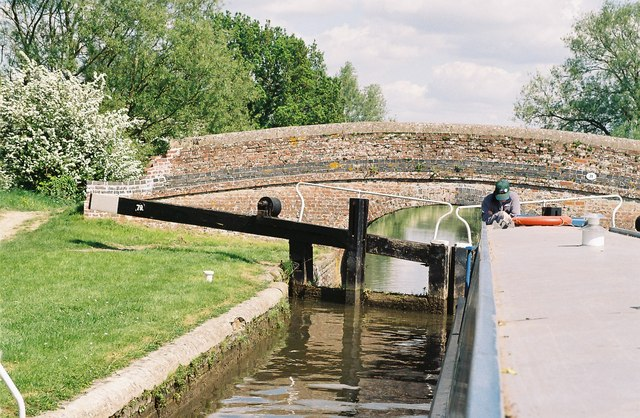
Dreweatt's Lock

Dreweatt's Lock is a lock on the Kennet and Avon Canal, between Kintbury and Newbury, Berkshire, England.

The lock has a rise/fall of 5 ft 9 in (175 m).

It is a grade II listed building.

== See also ==
- Locks on the Kennet and Avon Canal

Next lock upstream	Kennet and Avon Canal	Next lock downstream
Kintbury Lock	Dreweatt's Lock; Grid reference: SU411673	Copse Lock
