= Ham Lock =

Canal lock in Newbury, Berkshire, England

Coordinates: 51.40175°N 1.30131°W

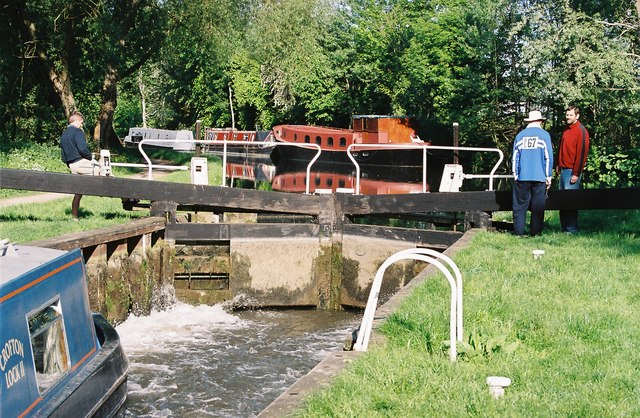
Ham Lock, Kennet & Avon Canal.

Ham Lock is a lock on the Kennet and Avon Canal, at Newbury, Berkshire, England.

Ham Lock was built between 1718 and 1723 under the supervision of the engineer John Hore of Newbury. The canal is administered by the Canal & River Trust. The lock has a rise/fall of 4 ft 2 in (1.27 m).

== See also ==
- Locks on the Kennet and Avon Canal

| Next lock upstream | River Kennet / Kennet and Avon Canal | Next lock downstream |
| Greenham Lock | Ham Lock; Grid reference: SU487672 | Bull's Lock |
