= Greenham Lock =

Canal lock in Berkshire, England

Coordinates: 51.40271°N 1.31136°W

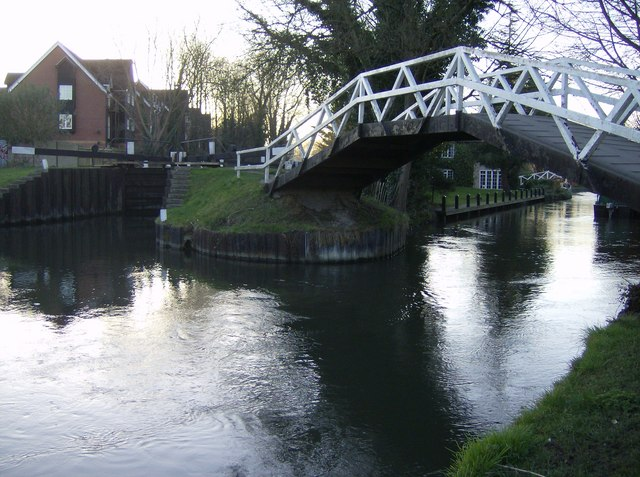
Greenham Lock

Greenham Lock is a lock on the Kennet and Avon Canal, at Newbury, Berkshire, England.

Greenham Lock was built between 1718 and 1723 under the supervision of the engineer John Hore of Newbury. The canal is administered by the Canal & River Trust. The lock has a rise/fall of 8 ft 11 in (2.72 m).

== See also ==
- Locks on the Kennet and Avon Canal

Next lock upstream	River Kennet / Kennet and Avon Canal	Next lock downstream
Newbury Lock	Greenham Lock; Grid reference: SU480673	Ham Lock
