= Copse Lock =

Lock on the Kennet and Avon Canal in England

Coordinates: 51.40135°N 1.39188°W

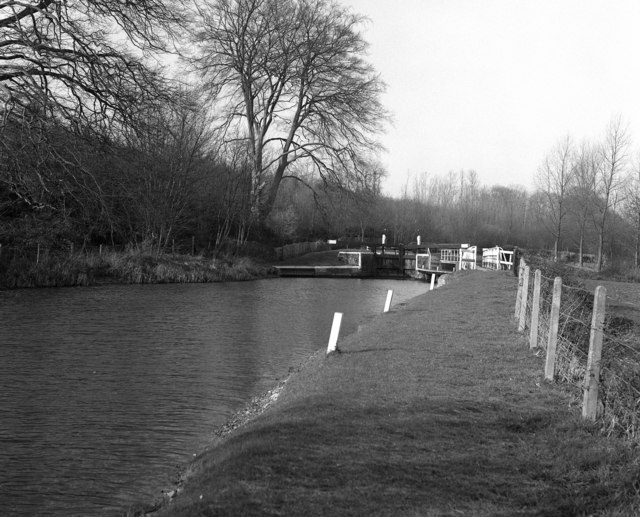
Copse Lock

Copse Lock is a lock on the Kennet and Avon Canal between Kintbury and Newbury in Berkshire, England.

The lock has a rise/fall of 6 ft 0 in (1.82 m).

== See also ==
- Locks on the Kennet and Avon Canal

| Next lock upstream | Kennet and Avon Canal | Next lock downstream |
| Dreweatt's Lock | Copse Lock; Grid reference: SU424671 | Hamstead Lock |
