= Newbury Bridge =

Bridge in Newbury, England

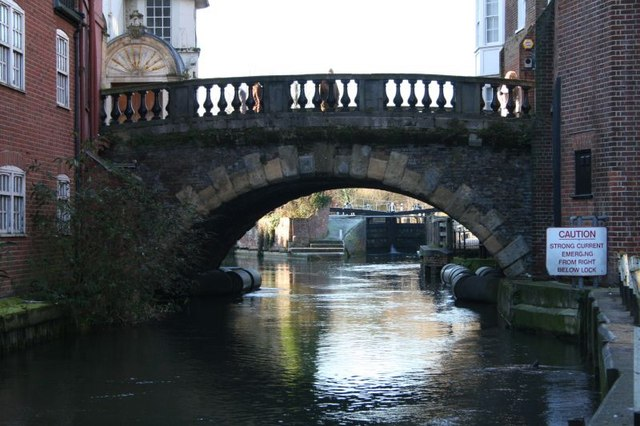
- View of Newbury Bridge looking upstream, with Newbury Lock beyond
- Coordinates: 51.401580°N 1.324237°W
- Carries: Bridge Street
- Crosses: River Kennet
- Locale: Newbury
- Heritage status: Grade II* listed

Characteristics
- Design: Arch

History
- Constructed by: James Clarke (or Clark)
- Inaugurated: 1772

Location
- Interactive map of Newbury Bridge

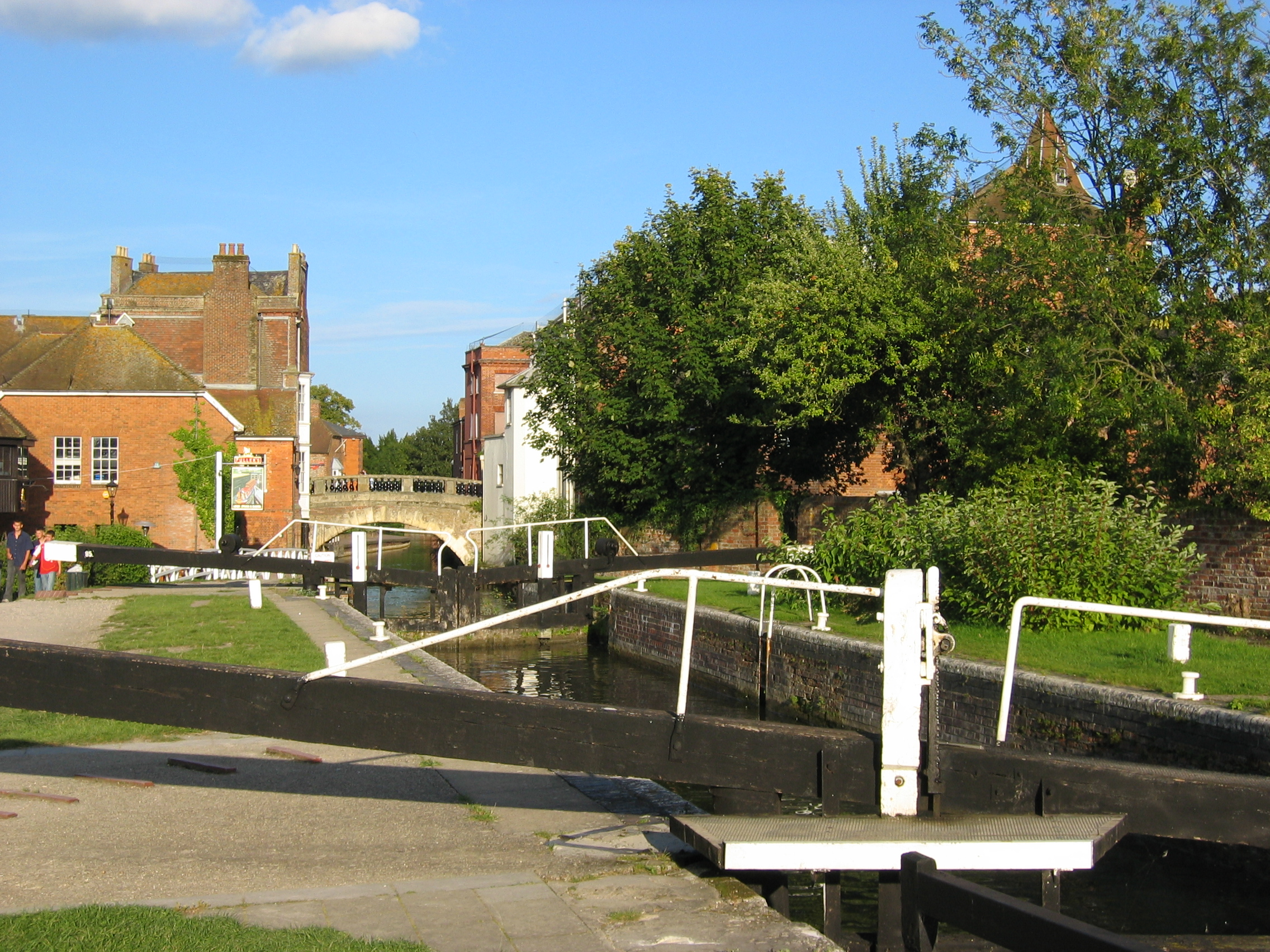
The bridge seen looking downstream from the lock

Newbury Bridge, also known as Kennet Bridge or Town Bridge, is a bridge across the River Kennet in the town centre of Newbury in the English county of Berkshire. The bridge carries Bridge Street, which links Northbrook Street, to the north of the river, with Bartholomew Street, to the south. The river channel under the bridge is also used by boats navigating the Kennet and Avon Canal. The current bridge was built between 1769 and 1772 and has three arches, although the two outer arches are now hidden by flanking buildings. It is a Grade II* listed structure.

== History ==
The first bridge across the River Kennet in Newbury dates back to the Middle Ages, and the earliest reference to it is an account of its reconstruction in the 14th Century. In 1312, King Edward II directed that the bridge should be kept in good order. By 1623, the bridge is recorded as being built of wood, being 30 feet (9.1 m) in length and 20 feet (6.1 m) in width, and having shops on it. However on 5 February of that year, the bridge collapsed unexpectedly. The bridge was presumably rebuilt, as in 1644, during the Second Battle of Newbury, a guard was placed on the bridge by the Cavaliers to prevent an attack from the south by the Roundheads.

In 1723, the Kennet Navigation made the River Kennet navigable downstream from Newbury to the River Thames in Reading, but the navigation terminated to the east of the bridge and did not pass under it. In 1726, the wooden bridge was swept away by floods and subsequently replaced with another similar bridge. In 1769 this bridge was demolished and work started on the current triple arched stone and brick bridge. The work was under the direction of the builder, who is variously reported as James Clarke or James Clark, and was completed in 1772.

In 1794, work started on the centre section of the Kennet and Avon Canal, which would extend the Kennet Navigation to Bath, thus providing a through route between London and Bristol. The new canal used the stretch of the River Kennet under the bridge to gain access to Newbury Lock, the first lock on the new section. As the bridge pre-dated the canal, there was no provision for a towpath under the bridge. In the absence of this, a line to haul the barge had to be floated under the bridge and then re-attached to the horse where the tow path resumed. Over time, grooves were worn by hauling lines under the bridge and these can still be seen today.

By the outbreak of World War II, Newbury Bridge still provided the only through road crossing over the Kennet in the Newbury area, and military planners were concerned about the consequences of it being damaged or destroyed in an air raid. As a result, in 1940, a temporary bridge was built some 250 metres (820 ft) downstream, this bridge becoming known as the American Bridge and lasting until it was replaced in 2001. The American Bridge was to be the first of three bypass bridges built. The second was a bridge on the first Newbury by-pass, 100 metres (330 ft) further downstream from the American Bridge, opened in 1963. When the first by-pass proved insufficient to cope with the volume of traffic travelling north-south through the Newbury area, a second by-pass was built to the west of Newbury. This included separate bridges over the river and canal some 2.2 kilometres (1.4 mi) upstream of the Town Bridge, and opened in 1998.
