= Victoria Park, Newbury =

Public park in Berkshire, England

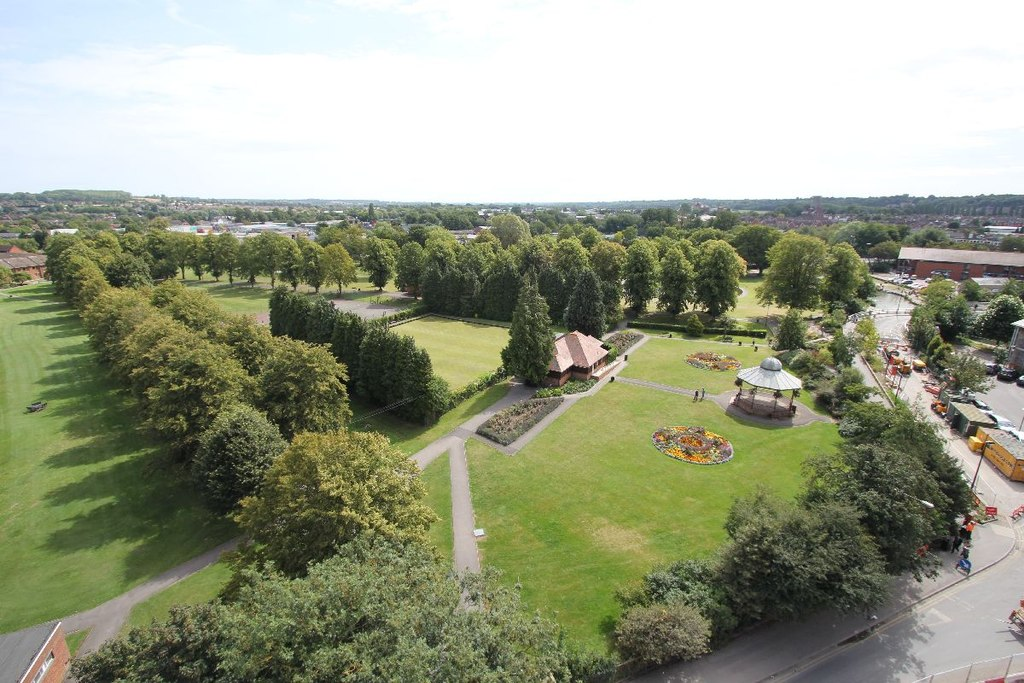
- Aerial view of the park
- Interactive map of Victoria Park, Newbury
- Type: Public park
- Location: Newbury, Berkshire
- Coordinates: 51°24′10.8″N 1°19′15.6″W

Victoria Park is a small public park near to the centre of Newbury, Berkshire, England. Current features of the park include a bandstand, tennis courts, boating lake, bowls club, skatepark, and a statue of Queen Victoria.

== History ==
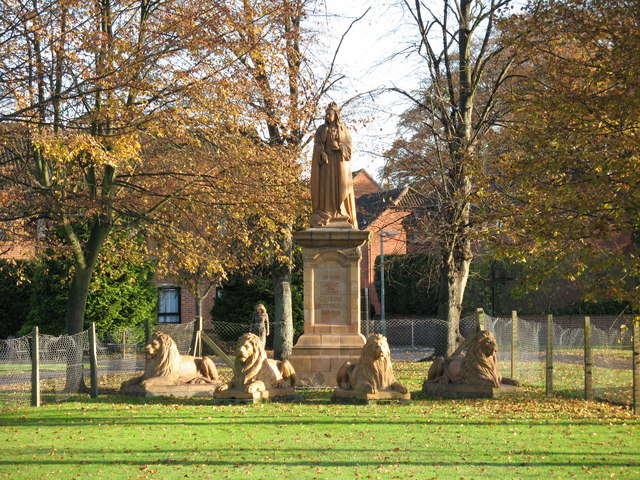
Statue of Queen Victoria

Originally Victoria Park was called The Marsh, however by the turn of the 20th century the name Victoria Park had arisen. This is likely due to the Queen's popularity and the fact that many public celebrations, such as the Queen's jubilee were held in the park. The statue of her was originally placed in the Market Place in 1903, subsequently moved to Greenham House in 1933 and then to Victoria Park 1966.

Up until the 1930s the park was common land, which included the right to graze cattle. The park used to be larger, however it has been gradually encroached upon by housing and the nearby A339 road to the eastern edge of the park, which up until the building of the Newbury bypass was the main route for traffic between Oxford and Southampton.

The A339 was in fact built on the path of a stream called the Minny Flush, because of the number of minnows to be found in it.

=== The American Bridge ===
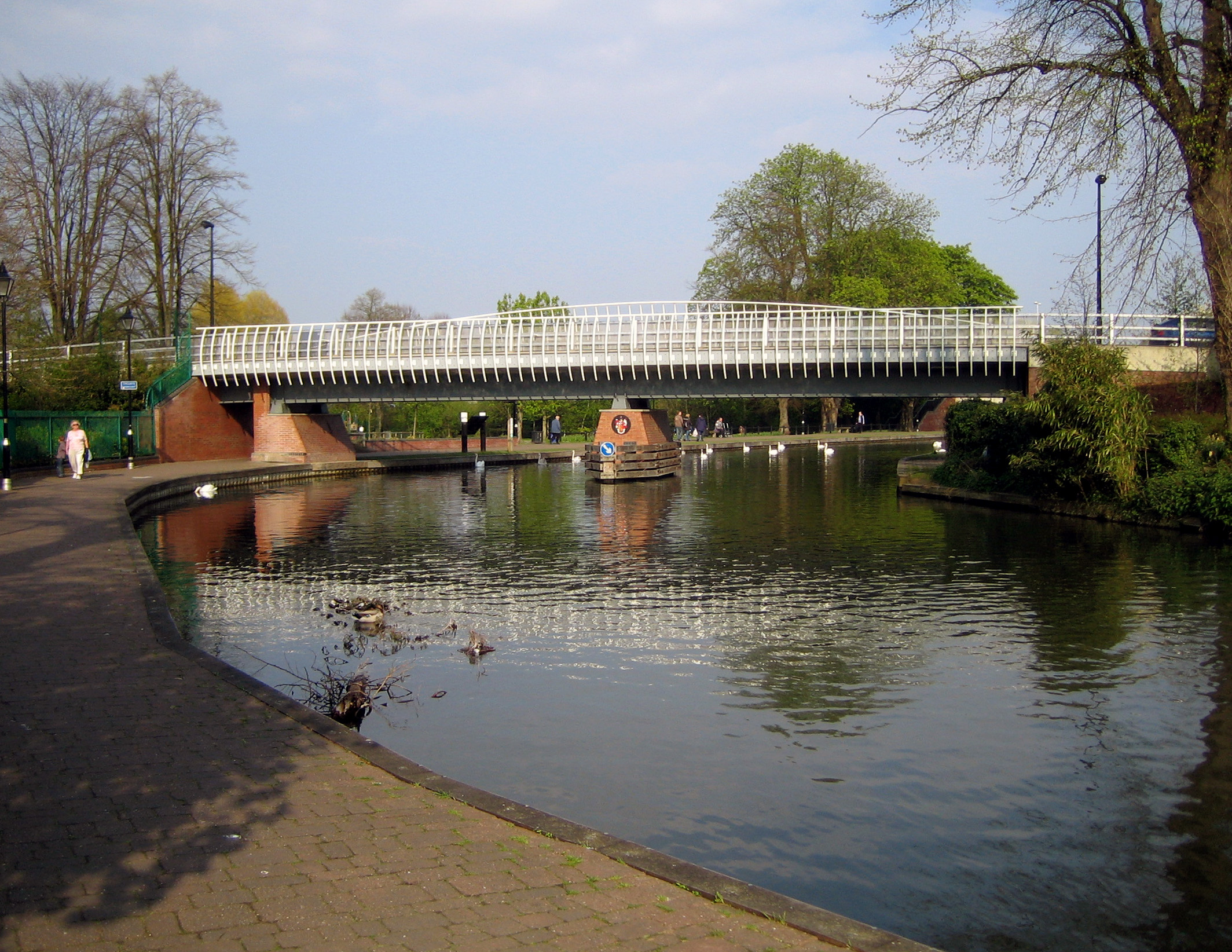
The new bridge over the Kennet and Avon canal.

During the Second World War a temporary or emergency bridge was built over the Kennet and Avon canal, joining the park with the centre of town. The reason for this was because it was feared the Town Bridge was to be bombed which would have effectively split the town in two. Although it was supposed to be a temporary bridge it became a key crossing point and lasted up until 2001 when it was replaced with a new structure. Erroneously this was called the American Bridge because although it was built by civilian contractors for the War Office its plans had been stamped by the American Army, certifying its use for their forces. A major problem with the temporary bridge was that it was only 7 ft (2.1 m) high, much lower than the recommended height of 8 ft 6 in (2.59 m).
