= Kintbury Lock =

English canal lock

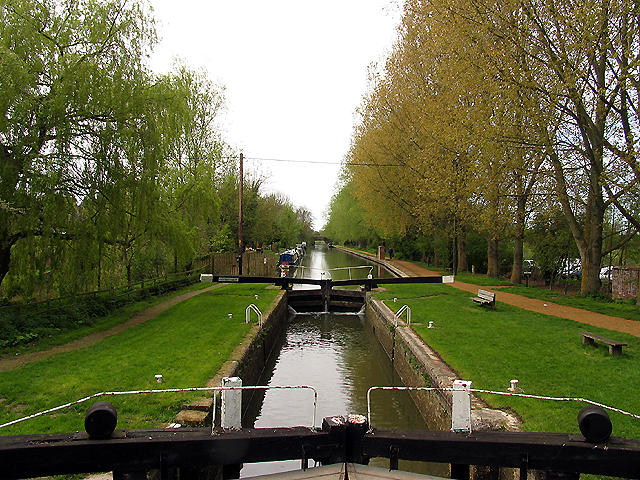
- Kintbury Lock
- 51.4016°N 1.4465°W
- Waterway: Kennet and Avon Canal
- Country: England
- County: Berkshire
- Maintained by: British Waterways
- Operation: manual
- First built: 1718–1723
- Fall: 5 feet 9 inches (1.75 m)

Kintbury Lock is a lock on the Kennet and Avon Canal, at Kintbury, Berkshire, England.

The lock has a rise/fall of 5 feet 9 inches (1.75 m).

== See also ==
- List of locks on the Kennet and Avon Canal

Next lock upstream	Kennet and Avon Canal	Next lock downstream
Brunsden Lock	Kintbury Lock; Grid reference: SU386671	Dreweatt's Lock
