= Higg's Lock =

Canal lock in Berkshire, England

Coordinates: 51.39758°N 1.35887°W

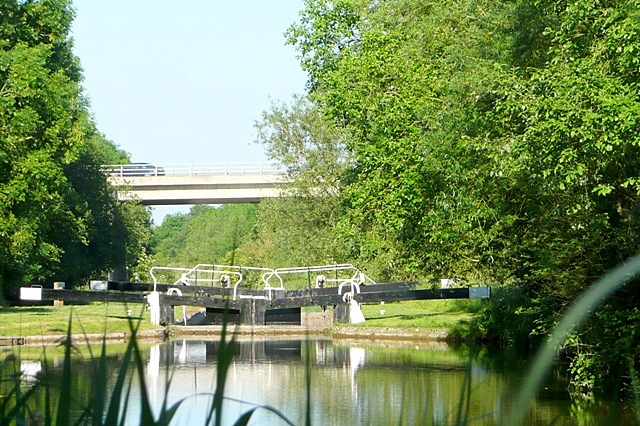
Higg's Lock

Higg's Lock is a lock on the Kennet and Avon Canal, between Kintbury and Newbury, Berkshire, England.

The lock has a rise/fall of 5 ft 10 in (1.78 m).

== See also ==
- Locks on the Kennet and Avon Canal

Next lock upstream	Kennet and Avon Canal	Next lock downstream
Benham Lock	Higg's Lock; Grid reference: SU447667	Guyer's Lock
