= Bull's Lock =

Lock on the Kennet and Avon Canal, at Newbury, Berkshire, England

Coordinates: 51.39715°N 1.28413°W

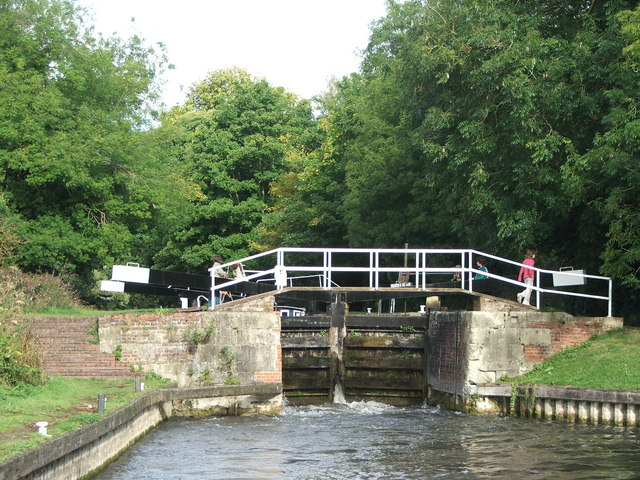
Bull's Lock, Kennet & Avon Canal.

Bull's Lock is a lock on the Kennet and Avon Canal, at Newbury, Berkshire, England.

Bull's Lock was built between 1718 and 1723 under the supervision of the engineer John Hore of Newbury. The canal is administered by the Canal & River Trust. The lock has a rise/fall of 5 ft 9 in (1.75 m).

== See also ==
- Locks on the Kennet and Avon Canal

Next lock upstream	River Kennet / Kennet and Avon Canal	Next lock downstream
Ham Lock	Bull's Lock; Grid reference: SU499667	Widmead Lock
