= Peter Randall-Page =

British artist and sculptor (born 1954)

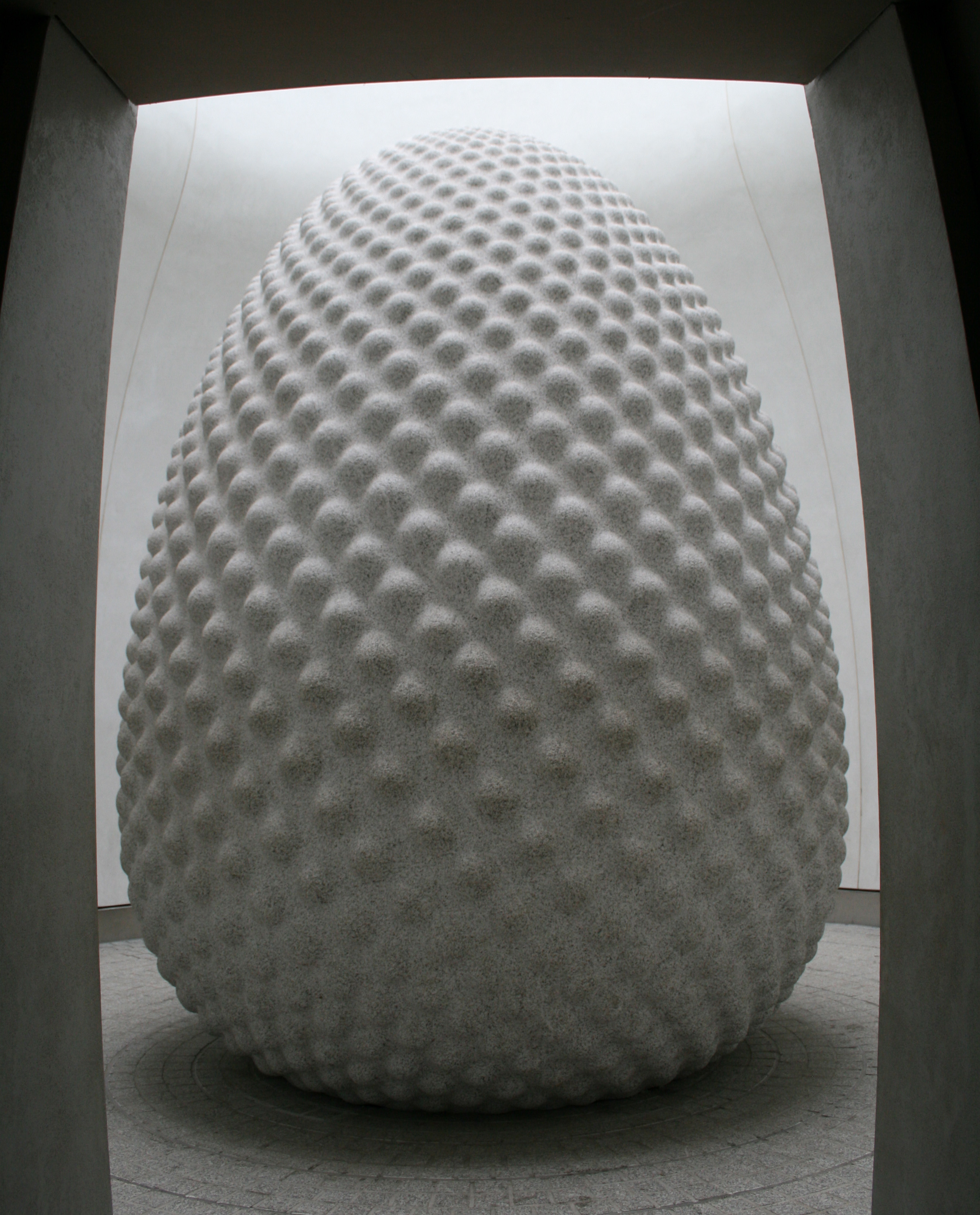
- Seed
- Born: Peter Marty Randall-Page; 2 July 1954 (age 72); Essex, England, United Kingdom
- Education: Bath Academy of Art
- Known for: Sculptor, Printer, Drawer
- Awards: Winston Churchill Memorial Trust Travelling Fellowship (1980), Honorary Doctorate of Art, University of Plymouth (1999), 2006 Marsh Award for Public Sculpture

Peter Randall-Page RA (born 1954) is a British artist and sculptor, known for his stone sculpture work, inspired by geometric patterns from nature. In his words "geometry is the theme on which nature plays his infinite variations, fundamental mathematical principle become a kind of pattern book from which nature constructs the most complex and sophisticated structures".

== Biography ==
Randall-Page was born in Essex and spent his childhood in Sussex both studying at the Bath Academy of Art from 1973 to 1977 after which he worked with the sculptor Barry Flanagan. After working on a conservation project at Wells Cathedral, Randall-Page went to Italy to study stone carving at the Carrara quarries. Returning to Britain, he was a visiting lecturer at Brighton Polytechnic throughout the 1980s and established a studio at Drewsteignton in Devon. From there he undertook a number of significant public sculpture commissions, often featuring fruit and organic forms. These included works for the regeneration of Castle Park in Bristol and for the Eden Project in Cornwall. For the Eden Project he was a member of the design team for the Education Resource Centre (The Core), influencing the overall design of the building and incorporating an enormous granite sculpture, Seed, at its heart. A major retrospective of his work was held in 1992 at the Leeds City Art Gallery and the Yorkshire Sculpture Park. During 1994 Randall-Page held an artist-in-residence post at the Tasmanian School of Art and undertook a lecture tour of Australia, supported by the Arts Council England.

In 1980, he was taken on by the Anne Berthoud Gallery in London's Covent Garden. Randall-Page's work is held in numerous public and private collections throughout the world including Japan, South Korea, Australia, United States, Ireland, Germany and the Netherlands. His public sculptures can be found in London, Edinburgh, Manchester, Bristol and Newbury. His work is represented in the permanent collections of the Tate Gallery and the British Museum.

Randall-Page was elected to the Royal Academy in 2015. In 1999, he was awarded an Honorary Doctorate of Arts from the University of Plymouth and from 2002 to 2005 was an Associate Research Fellow at Dartington College of Arts.

== Portraits of Randall-Page ==
The National Portrait Gallery collection has 2003 and 2011 bromide photographic images of Randall-Page.

== Public collections ==
- Arnolfini Collection Trust, Bristol
- The British Council.
- The British Embassy, Dublin
- The British Museum
- Bughley Sculpture Garden
- Castle Museum and Art Gallery, Nottingham
- The Contemporary Art Society, London
- The Creasy Collection of Contemporary Art, Salisbury
- Derby Arboretum
- University of Exeter
- Leeds City Art Galleries
- Lincoln City Council
- Milton Keynes Community NHS Trust
- The National Trust Foundation for Art
- Nottinghamshire City Council
- University of Nottingham
- Prior's Court School for Autistic Children, Thatcham
- University of Tasmania
- Tate Collection; 'Where the Bee Sucks'(1991)
- Ulster Museum, Belfast
- Usher Gallery, Lincolnshire County Council
- University of Warwick, Coventry
- West Kent College, Tonbridge
- The Dartington Hall Trust estate, Devon
- The Eden Centre, Cornwall

== Selected public works ==
Image	Title / subject	Location and coordinates	Date	Type	Material	Dimensions	Designation	Wikidata	Notes
	Fruit Gathers	Rufford Craft Centre, Edwinstowe, England	1982	Sculpture group	Stone	Various			
	Beneath the Skin	Bloomsbury Way, London	1991	Sculpture	Granite				
More images	Beside the Still Waters	Castle Park, Bristol	1993	Two sculptures & water feature	Granite				
More images	Hundred Year Stone	Beside Derwentwater, Cumbria	1995	Sculpture	Andesite	220 x 140 x 130cm		Q41706237	
More images	Ebb and Flow	Newbury Lock, Berkshire	2003	Fountain and paving	Granite	2.4m diameter fountain		Q87448632	
More images	Between the Lines	Fisher Square, Cambridge	2007	Sculpture	Granite glacial boulder	178 x 214 x 180cm			
More images	Seed	The Core, Eden Project	2007	Sculpture	Granite				
More images	Corpus, Fructus and Phyllotaxus	New Art Centre, Salisbury	2009, 2013 (Phyllotaxus)	Sculpture group	Limestone				Previously at Campus Westend, Goethe University Frankfurt and elsewhere.
More images	Walking the Dog	Dulwich Picture Gallery	2009	Sculpture group	Granite				
More images	Shapes in the Clouds II	Riverside Walk, Millbank, London	2014	Sculpture	Marble			Q120598719	
	The One and The Many	Fitzroy Place, London	2015	Sculpture	Granite glacial boulder	178 x 214 x 180cm			
