= Chinatown, Honolulu =

Historic neighborhood of Honolulu, Hawaii

- Chinatown Historic District
- U.S. National Register of Historic Places
- U.S. Historic district
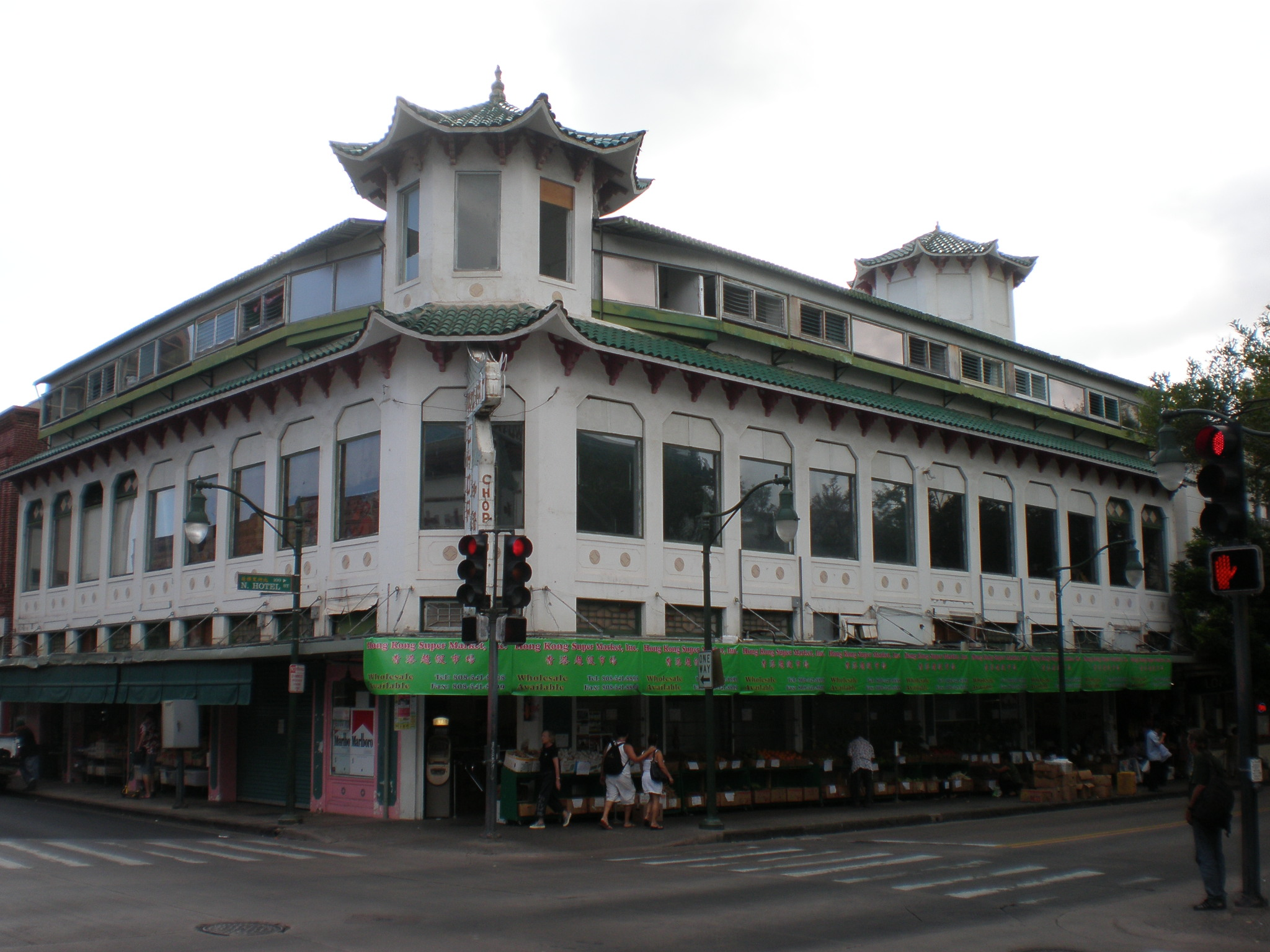
- Historic Wo Fat restaurant building (built 1938), at the corner of Hotel and Maunakea

- Location within Honolulu Location within Oahu Location within Hawaii
- Location: Beretania Street, Nuuanu Stream, Nuuanu Avenue, and Honolulu Harbor, Honolulu, Hawaii
- Coordinates: 21°18′44″N 157°51′46″W
- Area: 36 acres (15 ha)
- Built: 1900
- NRHP reference No.: 73000658
- Added to NRHP: January 17, 1973

The Chinatown Historic District is a neighborhood of Honolulu, Hawaii, known for its Chinese American community. It is one of the oldest Chinatowns in the United States.

== Geography ==
There is conflicting information about the boundaries that make up Chinatown. One source identifies the natural boundary to the west as Honolulu Harbor, and to the north, Nuʻuanu stream. Beretania Street is usually considered the eastern boundary, and the southern boundary is Nuʻuanu Avenue, although the Chinatown Special District is considered to extend approximately a block and a half south of Nuʻuanu along Merchant Street. In total, the land area is 522 acres (211 ha). A few blocks to the east is the Hawaii Capital Historic District, and adjacent to the south is the Merchant Street Historic District.

Alternatively, the Hawaiian language newspaper Nupepa Kuokoa described Taona Pake (Chinatown) in 1900 as "that whole area from West side of Kukui Street until the river mouth called Makaaho, then travel straight until reaching Hotel street; and travel on [Hotel] this street on the West side until reaching Konia Street, and travel until you reach King St.

=== Locations ===
Selected locations in Chinatown, Honolulu
- Points of interest
- Parks and open spaces
1 Chinatown Cultural Plaza, 100 N Beretania St
2 Oahu Market, 145 N King St
3 Maunakea Marketplace, 1120 Maunakea St
4 Smith-Beretania Park
5 Dr. Sun Yat-sen Memorial Park
6 Hawaii Theatre, 1130 Bethel St

Since 2002, there are two small paifang on the sidewalks flanking North King Street, just north of where King crosses Nuʻuanu Stream, and just south of where Hotel splits from King. There is also a small brick entrance arch to Maunakea Marketplace off Maunakea Street, decorated with an awning featuring a green-tile roof. Two guardian lions mark the southern entrance to Chinatown on Hotel, between Bethel and Nuʻuanu near the Dr. Sun Yat-sen Memorial Park (formerly Chinatown Gateway Park); they were gifted to Honolulu by a sister city, Kaohsiung, in 1989. Dr. Sun was born in another of Honolulu's sister cities, Zhongshan.

The Wo Fat Restaurant was Honolulu's oldest. The business first opened in 1882, but the building was destroyed in the 1886 fire. A new building was built at 115 North Hotel Street (21°18′44.4″N 157°51′47″W) after the 1900 fire, and the current three-story building at the same location opened in 1938, designed by Y.T. Char. The Wo Fat Restaurant closed in 2005, and the building housed a nightclub in the early 2000s.

In 1904, the Oahu Market was opened by Tuck Young at the corner of King and Kekaulike streets, coordinates 21°18′45″N 157°51′51″W. The simply designed functional construction, consisting of a large, open-air, covered space divided into stalls, remains in use today for selling fresh fish and produce.

== History ==
The area was probably used by fishermen in ancient Hawaii but little evidence of this remains. Kealiʻimaikaʻi, the brother of Kamehameha I lived in the area at the end of the 18th century.

One of the first early settlers from outside was Isaac Davis, who lived there until 1810. Spaniard Don Francisco de Paula Marín lived in the southern end of the area in the early 19th century, and planted a vineyard in the northern end, for which Vineyard Boulevard is named.

During the 19th century laborers were imported from China to work on sugar plantations in Hawaii. Many became merchants after their contracts expired and moved to this area. The ethnic makeup has always been diverse, peaking at about 56% Chinese people in the 1900 census, and then declining. Honolulu is traditionally known in Chinese as 檀香山 (Tánxiāngshān), meaning Sandalwood Mountain.

Two major fires destroyed many buildings in 1886 and 1900. The 1886 fire started at 4 p.m. on April 18; according to contemporary news reports, the Chinese fire company was blamed for being unable to halt the progress and the fire consumed 60 acres (24 ha), destroying almost all of Chinatown, save two or three buildings. 8,000 residents were displaced. Sailors and marines from HMS Heroine were credited with keeping the fire contained to Chinatown by blowing up buildings.

The 1900 fire started during the destruction of a building infected with bubonic plague; the plague was confirmed in Honolulu on December 12, 1899. Schools were closed and 7000 residents of the area were put under quarantine. After 13 people died, the Board of Health ordered structures suspected of being infected to be burned. Residents were evacuated, and a few buildings were successfully destroyed while the Honolulu Fire Department stood by. However, on January 20, 1900, the fire went out of control after winds shifted, and destroyed most of the neighborhood instead. The neighborhood was rebuilt and many of the current buildings date from 1901. Very few are over four stories tall.

=== Bubonic Plague (1899–1900) ===
King Kamehameha III created the Board of Health on December 13, 1850. This became the first Board of Health in the United States. It was established to supervise the public health of the people of Hawaii, and to protect them against epidemic diseases. The Board of Health, which at that time was under the control of three physicians, Nathaniel B. Emerson, Francis R. Day and Clifford B. Wood, played an integral role during the bubonic plague outbreak that started in 1899. The situation had become so dire in Honolulu that Emerson, Day and Wood were afforded absolute dictatorial authority over Hawaii. This was the result of an agreement between the President of the Provisional Hawaiian Government, Mr. Sanford Ballard Dole, and the Attorney General, Mr. Henry E. Cooper, who concurred that nothing should impede the battle of the "dread disease". Cooper also served as the President of the Board of Health.

According to the Annual Reports published by the Hawaii State Department of Health, the first case of the bubonic plague was Yon Chong, a 22-year-old Chinese man who worked as a bookkeeper in Chinatown. Chong fell sick on December 9, 1899, and formed buboes, leading his attending physician to suspect the plague. A jointly-conducted diagnostic exam was performed by other doctors, who confirmed the suspicion. Their diagnosis was reported to Board President Cooper on December 11, 1899. Yon Chong died the following day, and Cooper made an announcement to the public about this first bubonic plague death.

After the public announcement, Cooper ordered an immediate military quarantine of the Chinatown area. In hopes of containing the plague in Honolulu, the Board of Health also closed Honolulu Harbor to both incoming and outgoing vessels. According to the official Board of Health records, only three human cases of the plague were recorded during the quarantine. On December 19, 1899, the quarantine of Chinatown and Honolulu Harbor was lifted. However, only five days after the quarantine was lifted, nine more cases were reported by the Board of Health. Of those 12 reported cases, 11 would die.

The epidemic continued until March 31, 1900. By the end, a total of 71 cases and 61 fatalities were reported by Board of Health.

=== Great Honolulu Chinatown Fire of 1900 ===
Great Honolulu Chinatown Fire of 1900
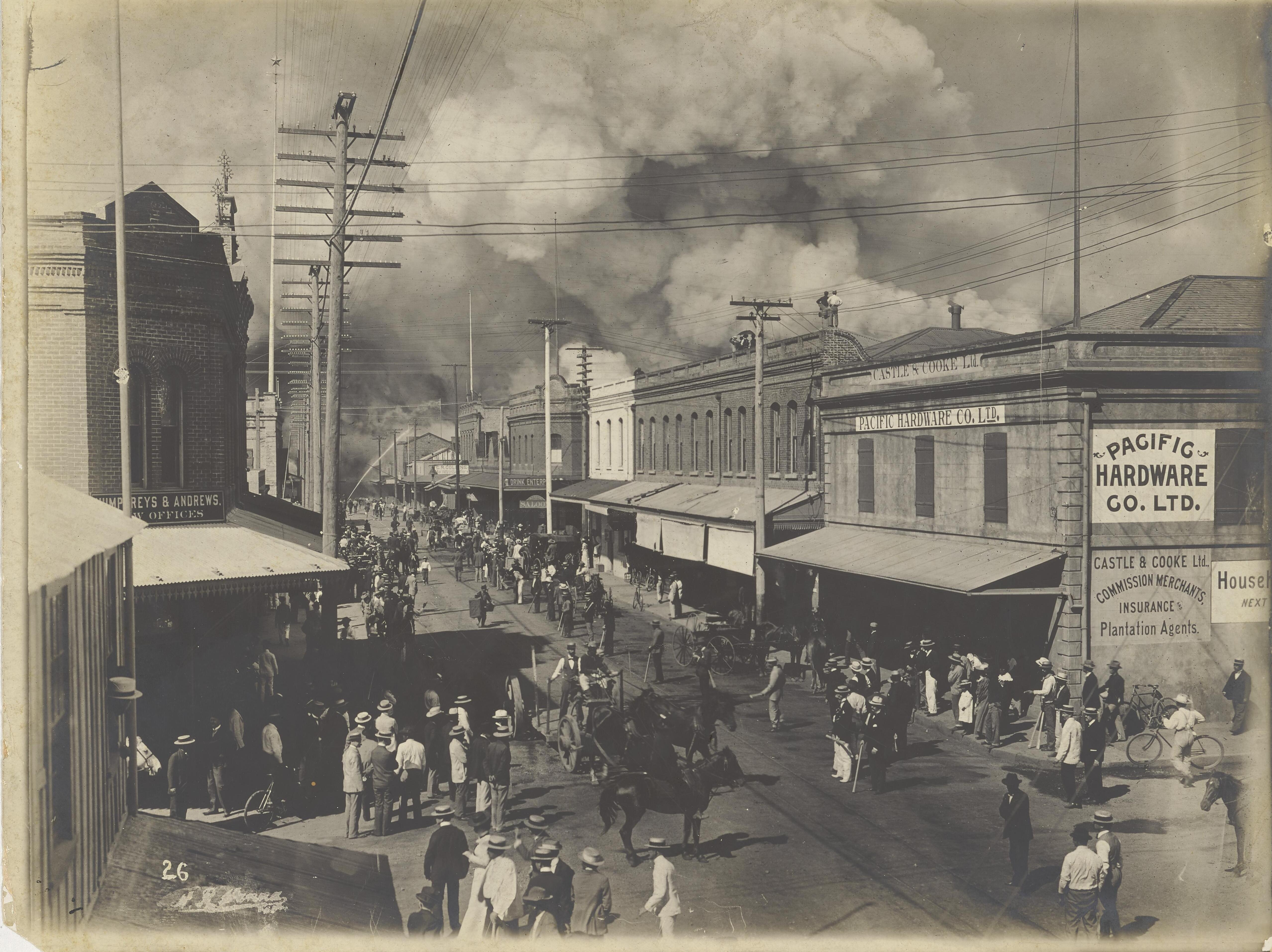
- Date: January 20 – February 6, 1900
- Location: Chinatown, Honolulu, Hawaii

Statistics
- Burned area: 38 acres (150,000 m^{2})
- Land use: urban

Impacts
- Deaths: 1 in Honolulu, 9 on Maui (all from plague)

The bubonic plague arrived in Honolulu on October 20, 1899, by a shipment of rice from a passenger ship called the America Maru, which had also been carrying rats. Additionally, an influx of Chinese immigration to Hawaii had resulted in crowded residences, poor living conditions, and improper sewage disposal in Honolulu's Chinatown.

The Board of Health responded by incinerating garbage, renovating the sewer system, putting Chinatown under quarantine, and most of all burning affected buildings. Forty-one fires were set in total, and on January 20, 1900, winds picked up one fire and spread it to other buildings. The fire burned out of control for seventeen days and scorched 38 acres (15 ha) of Honolulu, devastating the Chinese community. There were no deaths, but many people (of various ethnicities) were displaced with their livelihoods destroyed.

There were another 31 controlled burns after the incident. The refugees of the fire were now considered homeless and rounded up and moved to quarantine camps until April 30. White residents who had gathered to watch the fire escorted the victims to refugee camps by force, using baseball bats and pick handles to ensure compliance.

=== Rebuilding and preservation ===
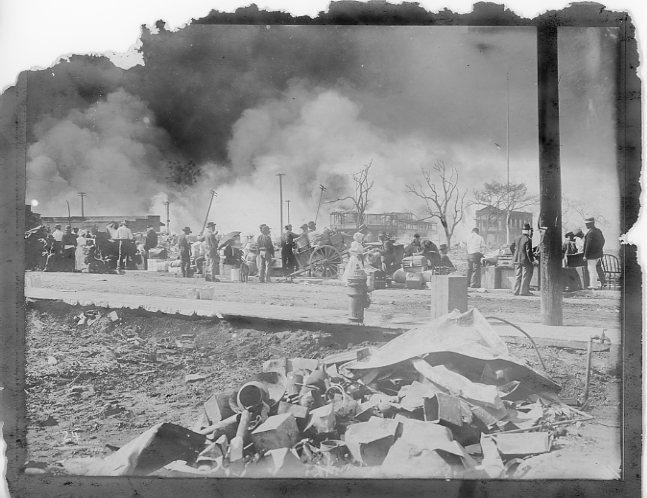
Heading down Queen Street toward Kakaʻako disaster camp after the Chinatown Fire, Kalihi-Pālama.

Many critics accused the government of Sinophobia, believing that the fires were deliberately set to destroy their community. An exodus occurred. While the former residents rebuilt Chinatown, many moved to the suburbs, hoping not to relive a similar incident. The post-fire architecture used masonry rather than wood, since stone and brick buildings were fire resistant.

Many of the people who filed damage claims were represented by lawyer Paul Neumann, but he died before the cases went to court.

After the fire, new businesses were established focusing on the Chinese community. Instead of viewing Chinatown as a segregated community, it became an area full of economic opportunities; with many of the wealthier Chinese finding different ways to commercialize the exoticism of Chinatown. With the increased tourism and foot-traffic, existing buildings; such as the Wo Fat Restaurant (reopened in 1938) revamped themselves in a distinctive "oriental" style to attract more visitors.

During World War II the area in and around Chinatown became an unofficially regulated red-light district, with their main clientele being American servicemen stationed in Hawai'i after Pearl Harbor. The area gained a negative reputation - with popular rhetoric claiming Chinatown was full of exotic immorality. Additionally, some Chinatown landmarks, such as Smith's Union Bar and Club Hubba Hubba, gained notoriety from consistent patronage by the troops stationed in Hawai'i.

After World War II, Chinatown experienced a significant decline. Although earlier promotional efforts had made Chinatown an exotic attraction for wartime tourists, the postwar period saw reduced attention and investment in the neighborhood. Additionally, with changing economic priorities, tourism shifted to other parts of Honolulu. Subsequently, Chinatown's buildings deteriorated, businesses struggled, and the area developed a reputation of being unsafe during the late 1940s and 1950s.

Around the 1950s, there were projects that focused on cleaning up large swaths of land in Chinatown's periphery, such as the Queen Emma Project. During the administrations of mayors Frank Fasi and Jeremy Harris the area was targeted for revitalization. Restrictions on lighting and signs were relaxed to promote nightlife. Special zoning rules were adopted for the area. These revitalizations efforts displaced thousands of residents, erasing vibrant and tightly knit ethnic communities.

The Hawaii National Bank was founded in the district in 1960, and has its headquarters there.

There was opposition to these urban renewal projects, particularly from groups like People Against Chinatown Eviction (PACE). By January 17, 1973, about 36 acres (15 ha) of the district were officially listed on both the National Register of Historic Places listings in Oahu and the National Register of Historic Places, as site 73000658. The historic designation helped limit planned demolition and opened access to preservation grants and tax breaks. Renovations of older buildings, like the Mendonca Block, helped spark a wave of historic rehabilitation projects. Developers and city officials also looked for ways to revive Chinatown's economy, especially after commercial centers like Ala Moana Center drew business away. By the late 1970s, initiatives like the Maunakea Marketplace helped draw local commerce back into the core of Chinatown. Although these later efforts helped protect the district and were crucial to its survival, they also aligned the district with urban developers, city beautification committees, and a cosmopolitan vision of Honolulu. As a result, many of the low-income residents who were displaced in earlier revitalization phases were not able to return.

On the eastern edge of the district, the Hawaii Theatre was restored and re-opened in 1996. The area around the theatre is called the Arts District. In 2005 a small park near the theatre at the corner of Hotel and Bethel streets was opened and named Chinatown Gateway Park. In November 2007 the park was renamed to honor Sun Yat-sen, who came to Chinatown in 1879; he was educated and planned the 1911 Revolution during his Hawaiian stay.

Honolulu Chinatown was included in the Preserve America program.

== Government and infrastructure ==
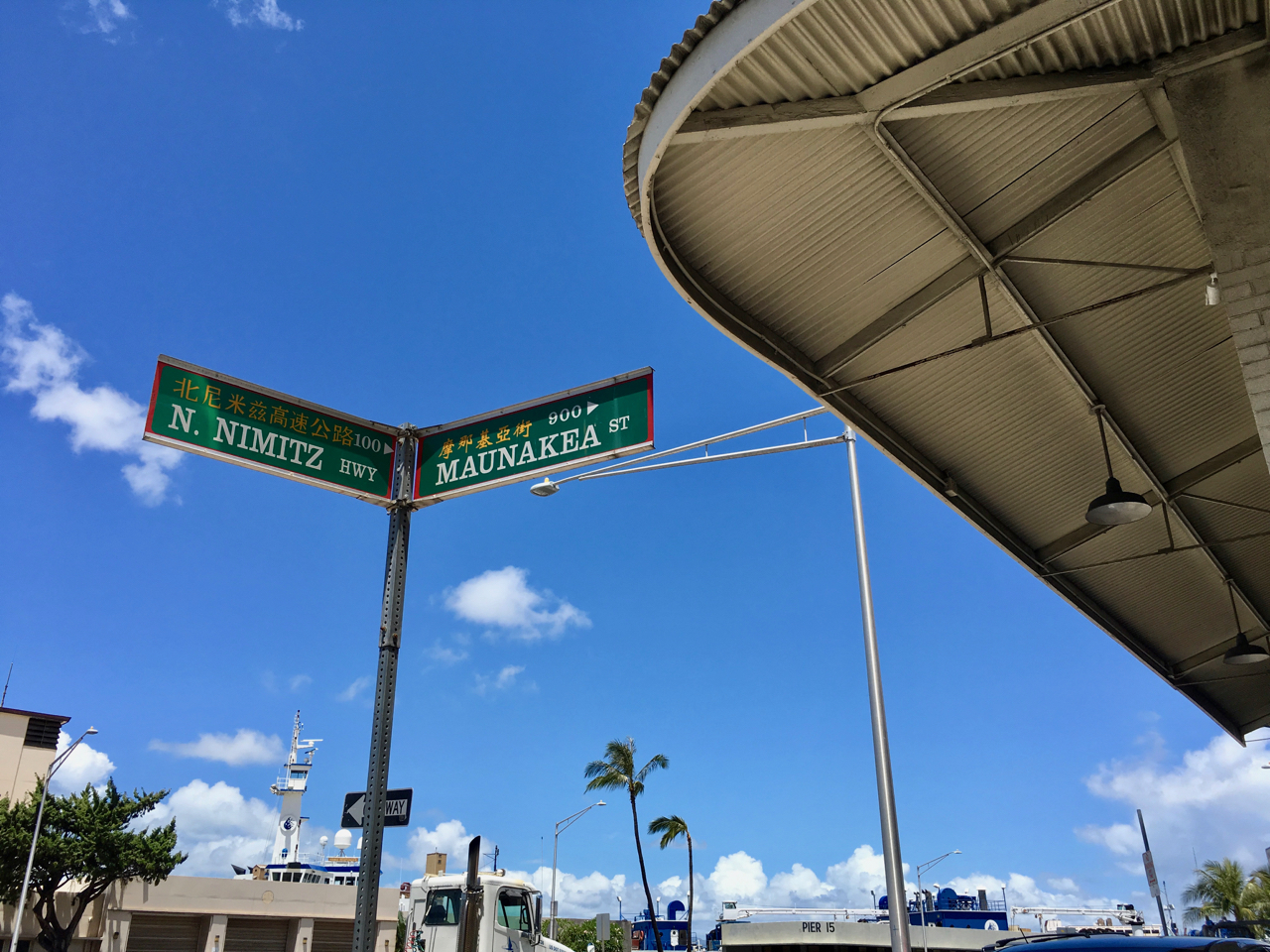
In Honolulu's Chinatown, street signs are different from usual signs; they are red-framed and written in English and Chinese.

The Chinatown-Downtown Honolulu Neighborhood Board is an elected nine-member volunteer organization dedicated to improving the governance of this specially designated region. It is a part of the City and County of Honolulu Neighborhood Commission Office. Currently, the Board is chaired by Ernest Caravalho and meets on the first Thursday of each month at 6 p.m. at the Keʻelikolani Middle School Cafeteria 1302 Queen Emma Street, Honolulu, Hawaii.

The downtown police substation of the Honolulu Police Department is located in Chinatown. Officials broke ground for the substation on Friday September 18, 1998. Mayor Jeremy Harris said that he wanted a police station built at that location because the presence of a police station would deter crime.

The Skyline rail system is anticipated to extend service to Chinatown by 2031; the future Hōlau station will be built in the median of Nimitz Highway between River and Kekaulike.

== Popular culture ==
- The character Charlie Chan was based on detective Chang Apana (1871–1933). After a vacation to Honolulu in 1919, Earl Derr Biggers read about Apana and based the character there
- The character Wo Fat in the TV series Hawaii Five-O was named after the eponymous restaurant in Honolulu's Chinatown
