= Hamstead Lock =

Canal lock in Berkshire, England

Coordinates: 51.40135°N 1.39188°W

Hamstead Lock is a lock on the Kennet and Avon Canal, at Hamstead Marshall between Kintbury and Newbury, Berkshire, England.

The lock has a rise/fall of 6 ft 5 in (1.96 m).

It is a grade II listed building.

== See also ==
- Locks on the Kennet and Avon Canal

Next lock upstream	Kennet and Avon Canal	Next lock downstream
Copse Lock	Hamstead Lock; Grid reference: SU424671	Benham Lock
