= Benham Lock =

Lock on Kennet and Avon Canal, England

Coordinates: 51.39585°N 1.37183°W

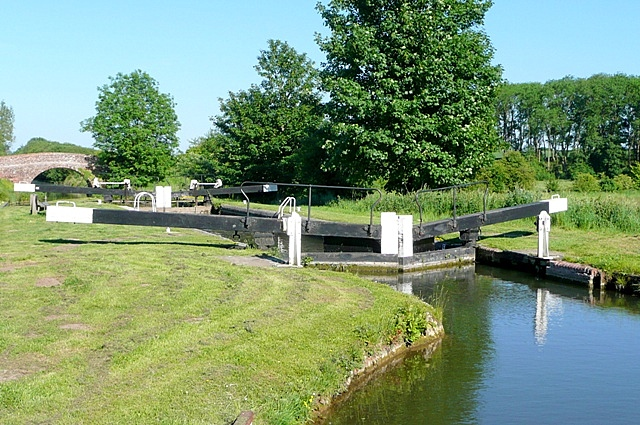
Benham Lock

Benham Lock, formerly known as Benham Bridge Lock is a lock on the Kennet and Avon Canal, between Kintbury and Newbury. It is located below Marsh Benham, but in the civil parish of Enborne, in the English county of Berkshire.

The lock lies some 60 metres (66 yd) west of Benham bridge.

The lock was constructed within the period between October 1794 and June 1797 and has a rise/fall of 6 ft 3 in (1.9 m).

In January 2017 the Canal and River Trust had to adjust, refit and repair the gates at Benham Lock due to them not closing properly and wasting water, the brickwork on the lock being re-pointed at the same time.

== See also ==
- Locks on the Kennet and Avon Canal

Next lock upstream	Kennet and Avon Canal	Next lock downstream
Hamstead Lock	Benham Lock; Grid reference: SU438665	Higg's Lock
