= Phoenix Brewery =

Brewery in Newbury, Berkshire, England

- The location of the Phoenix Brewery on Bartholemew Street
- Interactive map of Phoenix Brewery
- Location: Newbury, Berkshire, UK
- Coordinates: 51.398188°N 1.327146°W
- Opened: 18th century
- Closed: 1923 (acquired by Ushers)
- Owner: Finn family

The Phoenix Brewery (also known as Finns Brewery) was a brewery run by the Finns family in Newbury, Berkshire, UK.

== History ==
The brewery was founded in the early 19th century.

=== Premises ===
The brewer's house on Bartholomew Street was built in the 17th century and designed by James Clarke.

The main brewery buildings including the two-storey beerhouse and the three-storey brewhouse date from approximately 1842. The beerhouse features recessed sash windows and hipped roofing. The doorway to the building is wide and designed to be used for service access.

The top floor of the brewhouse contained a hoist, grain mill, water tanks and malt stores. The first floor held the engine room and the tuns while the ground floor housed the boiler, pumps, the well, and stores for barrels. The exterior of the brewhouse features a slated roof, dentil cornice and arched windows. The gables include crown glass louvres.

The complex became a Grade II listed building in November 1981.

=== Closure ===
In the 1923, the brewery closed and was taken over by Ushers of Trowbridge. The closure meant that there was no commercial brewery in West Berkshire for 71 years, until Butts Brewery opened in Great Shefford in 1994. Upon closure, the brewhouse was converted to be used for storage.

== Current use ==
In the early 2000s, the brewhouse was used as a restaurant and bar. In 2004, however, the business was refused an entertainment licence due to objections from local police. In 2008, the main brewery building was opened as apartments.

== See also ==
- List of Breweries in Berkshire
