= Guyer's Lock =

English canal lock

Coordinates: 51.39933°N 1.35022°W

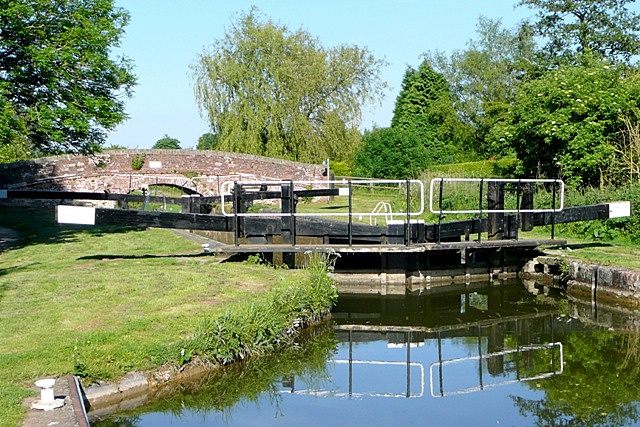
Guyer's Lock

Guyer's Lock is a lock on the Kennet and Avon Canal, between Kintbury and Newbury, Berkshire, England.

It is a grade II listed building.

== See also ==
- Locks on the Kennet and Avon Canal

Next lock upstream	Kennet and Avon Canal	Next lock downstream
Higg's Lock	Guyer's Lock; Grid reference: SU453669	Newbury Lock
