= Newbury Lock =

Canal lock in Newbury, Berkshire, England

Coordinates: 51.40099°N 1.32576°W

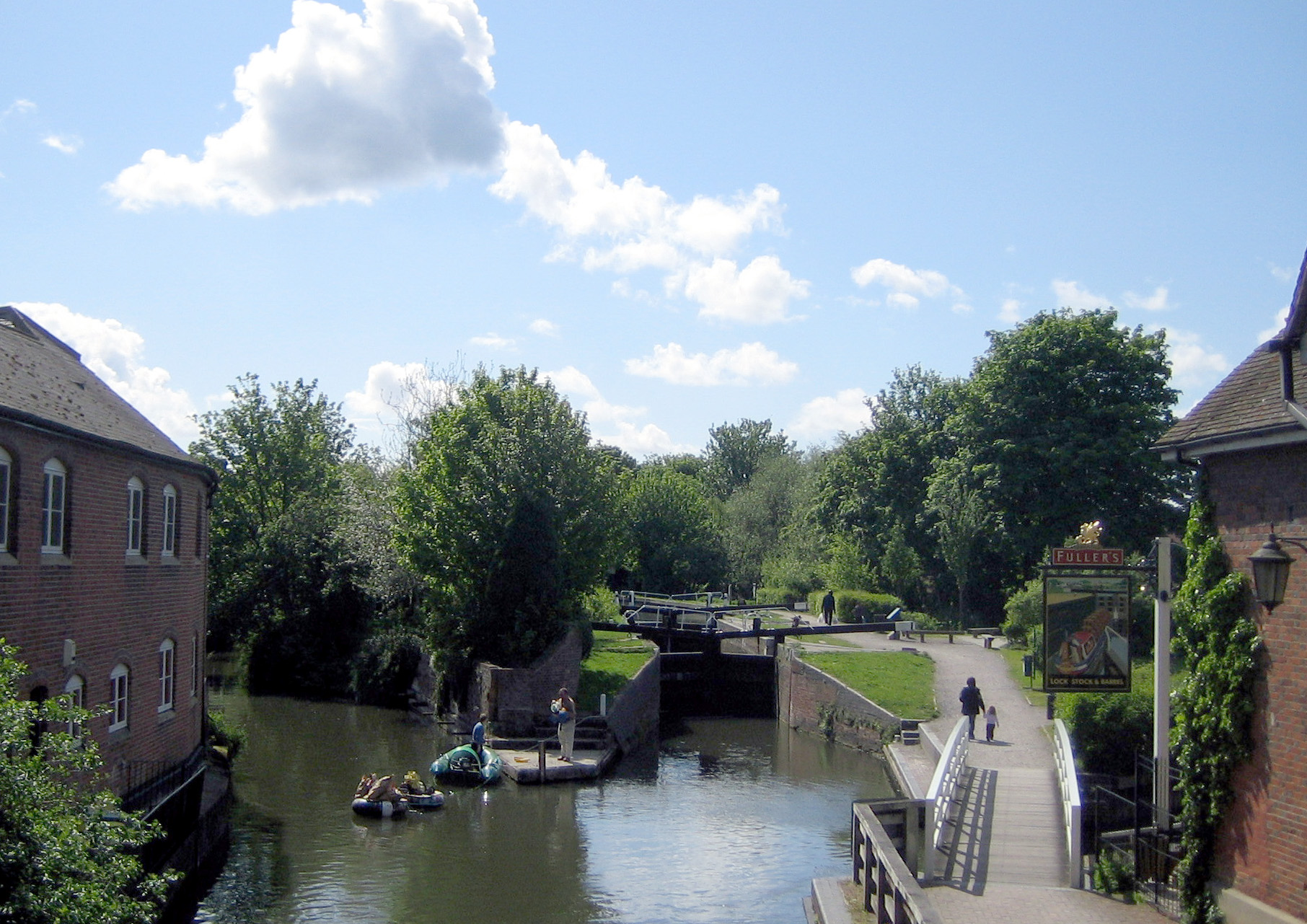
Newbury Lock seen from downstream

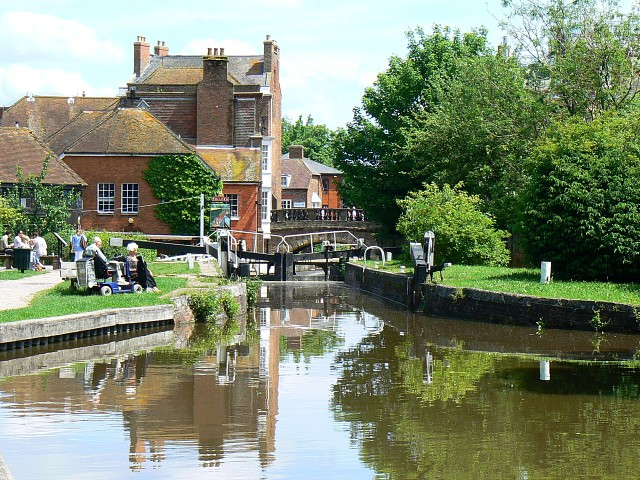
Newbury lock seen from upstream

Newbury Lock is a lock on the Kennet and Avon Canal in the town centre of Newbury, in the English county of Berkshire. It has a rise/fall of 3 ft 6 in (1.07 m), and is situated just upstream of Newbury Bridge.

The lock is a grade II listed structure. It has brick walls that are capped with Bath Stone and which are wider at the top than at the base in an attempt to counteract frost damage. It was built in 1796, as part of the construction of the Kennet and Avon Canal linking Newbury and Bath. The canal was built under the supervision of John Rennie.

Newbury Lock was the easternmost lock on the original Kennet and Avon Canal, and downstream it connected to what was the much older Kennet Navigation, opened in 1727 between Reading and Newbury. The canal opened throughout in 1810 and provided, along with the River Thames, the Kennet Navigation and the River Avon, a through route between London and Bristol. The Kennet Navigation was purchased by the Kennet and Avon Canal Company in 1812, and is now generally regarded as part of the Kennet and Avon canal.

Adjacent to the lock is a sculpture called Ebb And Flow, created by the sculptor Peter Randall-Page. The work comprises a large granite bowl set at the centre of a spiral granite path leading down from the lock. The bowl is connected to the lock by underground piping so that when the lock fills, water flows into the bowl and then empties away as the level of the water in the lock goes down.

== See also ==
- Locks on the Kennet and Avon Canal

Next lock upstream	Kennet and Avon Canal	Next lock downstream
Guyer's Lock	Newbury Lock; Grid reference: SU470671	Greenham Lock
