= Higgs Brewery =

Former brewery in Reading, England

Higgs Brewery was a commercial brewery in Reading in the English county of Berkshire.

== Location ==
The company was located at the Lion Brewery Castle Street (not to be confused with the Lion Brewery Hosier Street or the Reading Lion Brewery) in Castle Street near to St Mary's Church and what is now the road entrance to the Broad Street Mall and The Hexagon.

== Brewery tap ==
The brewery tap, known as "The Lion Brewery Tap", was located adjacent to the brewery and at one point featured livery of the Marlow-based Wethered's Brewery.
