= Hawaii Theatre =

- U.S. National Register of Historic Places
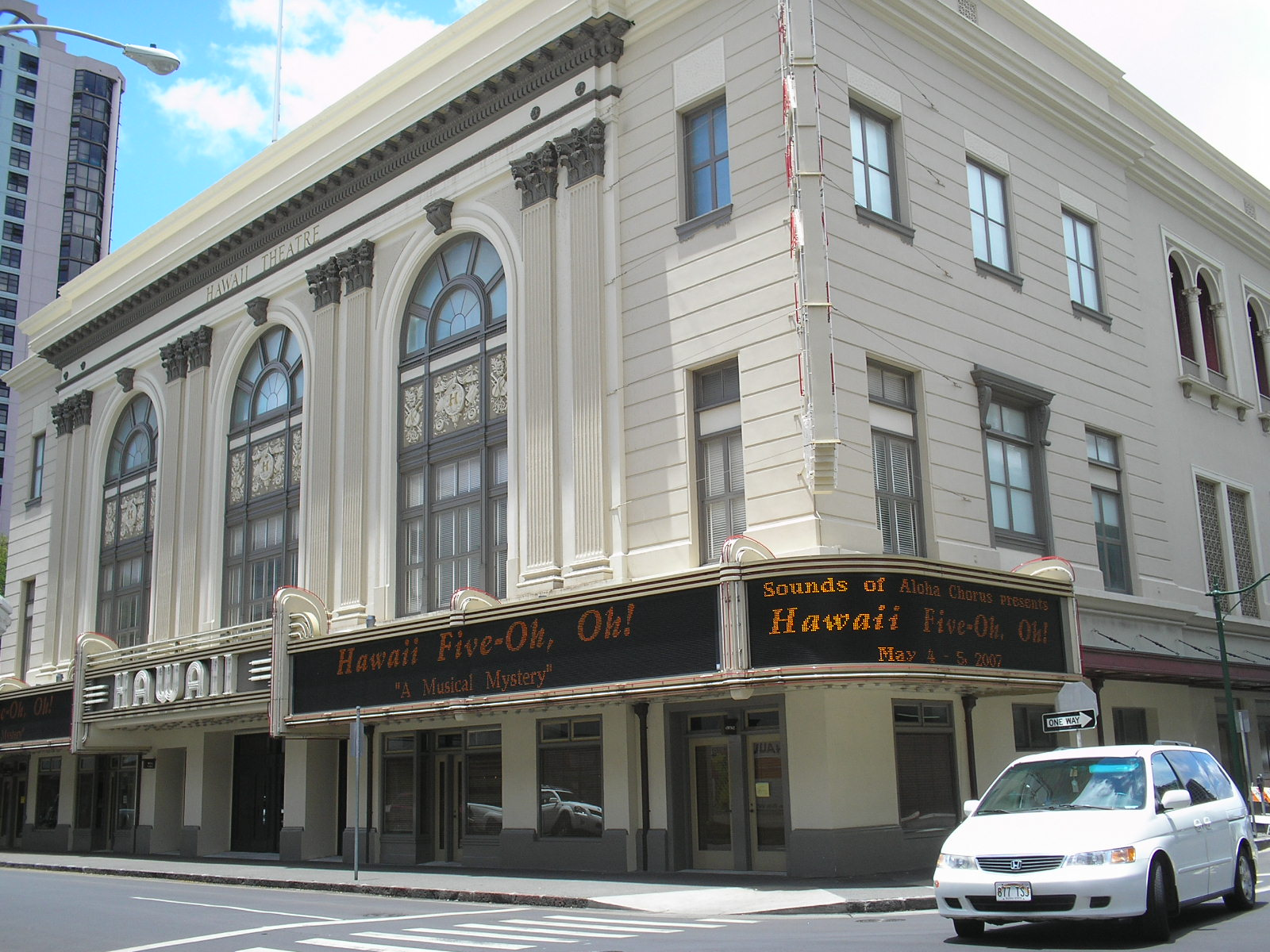

- Location within Hawaii
- Location: Honolulu, Hawaii
- Coordinates: 21°18′38″N 157°51′40″W
- Built: 1922
- Architect: Walter Emory, Marshall Webb
- Architectural style: Neoclassical, Art Deco, Eclectic architecture
- NRHP reference No.: 78001021
- Added to NRHP: 14 November 1978

The Hawaii Theatre is a theatre in downtown Honolulu, Hawaii, United States. Built in 1922, it is located at 1130 Bethel Street, between Hotel and Pauahi Streets, on the edge of Chinatown. It is listed on the State and National Register of Historic Places.

== History ==
When Consolidated Amusement Company opened the Hawaii Theatre on September 6, 1922, local newspapers called it "The Pride of the Pacific" and considered it the equal in opulence to any theatre in San Francisco or beyond. When it opened, it was Consolidated Amusement's flagship theatre and the largest (1,760 seats) and most ornate in Hawaii. The company's offices were also in the building.

Honolulu architects Walter Emory and Marshall Webb employed elements of Neoclassical architecture for the exterior—with Byzantine, Corinthian, and Moorish ornamentation—and a rich panoply of Beaux-Arts architecture inside—Corinthian columns, a gilded dome, marble statuary, an art gallery, plush carpets, silk hangings, and a Lionel Walden mural above the proscenium. The interior was wide and shallow, with a single balcony and two rows of loge boxes. On the main floor, two private boxes flanked the stage.

The exterior originally had a simple canopy with a small reader board listing the attractions, and a vertical sign lit by electric bulbs. In 1938, a large, new marquee was installed with the largest neon display in the islands.

The Hawaii Theatre presented both Vaudeville entertainment and silent films through the 1920s. It had its own full orchestra for live shows and a large Robert-Morton pipe organ used to accompany silent films. Following the introduction of sound films, it operated as a downtown movie theatre through the 1960s.

== Decline and revival ==
With the shift in entertainment and retail venues away from downtown beginning in the 1960s, theatre attendance gradually declined into the 1970s and early 1980s. Consolidated Amusement decided not to renew its lease and the Hawaii Theatre closed in 1984. Concerned about the Hawaii's potential demolition, several members of the theatre's pipe organ volunteer group formed the non-profit 501(c)(3) Hawaii Theatre Center and, joined by others, united to save and restore it, eventually undertaking major fund-raising efforts. In 1986, the organization was able to purchase the theatre and, subsequently, several adjacent buildings. An extensive renovation of the interior followed in 1994, coordinated by the architectural firm of Hardy Holzman Pfeiffer of New York City. The theatre reopened in 1996, while exterior renovations continued through 2005. The large marquee from 1938, which had deteriorated and been removed, was replicated and installed, and featured new electronic display panels.

== Current operation and accolades ==
The Hawaii Theatre is once again a popular venue for stage shows and concerts, and continues today as a successful performing arts center. In 2005, the League of Historic America Theatres named it the "Outstanding Historic Theatre in America"; in 2006, the National Trust for Historic Preservation gave the Hawaii Theatre its highest "Honor Award" for national preservation; and in 2006, the Hawaii Better Business Bureau presented its "Torch Award for Business Ethics" to the Hawaii Theatre Center, the first small nonprofit to receive that award.

The Hawaii Theatre is the last surviving, operating historic theatre in Honolulu. Guided tours of the theatre are regularly offered. It is also the current home of the Honolulu Symphony.

== Gallery ==
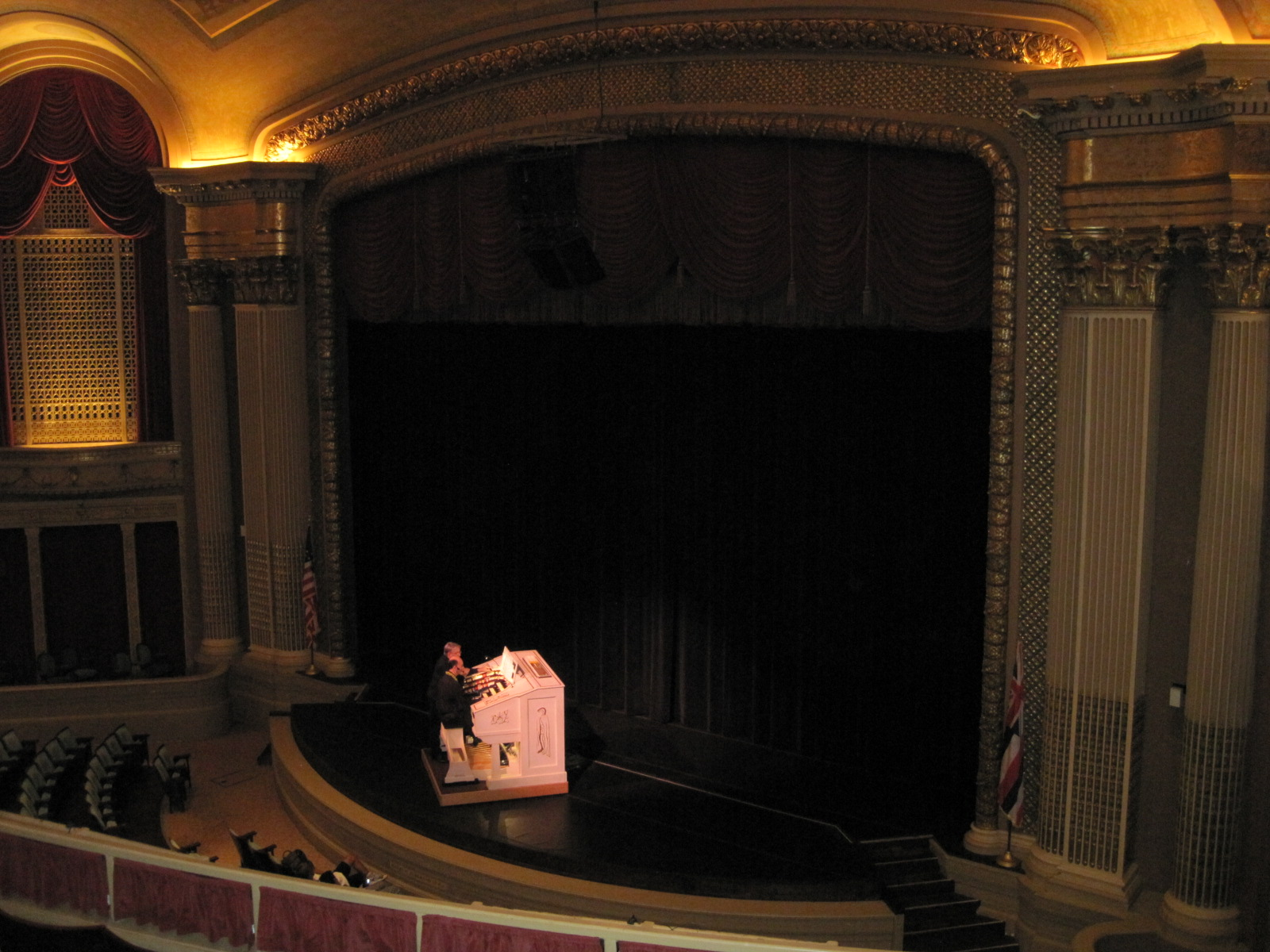
Proscenium and stage

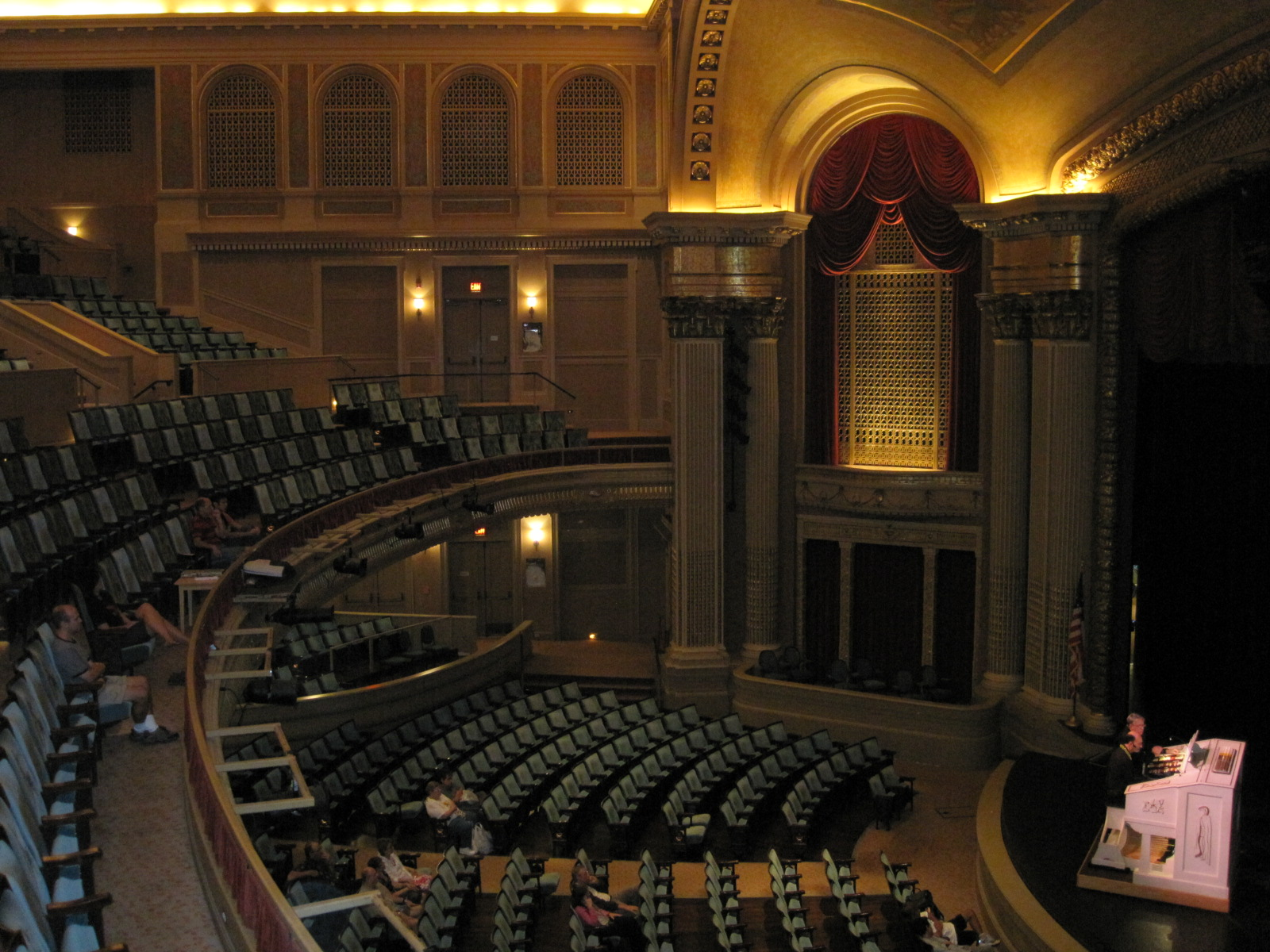
Interior, left sidewall

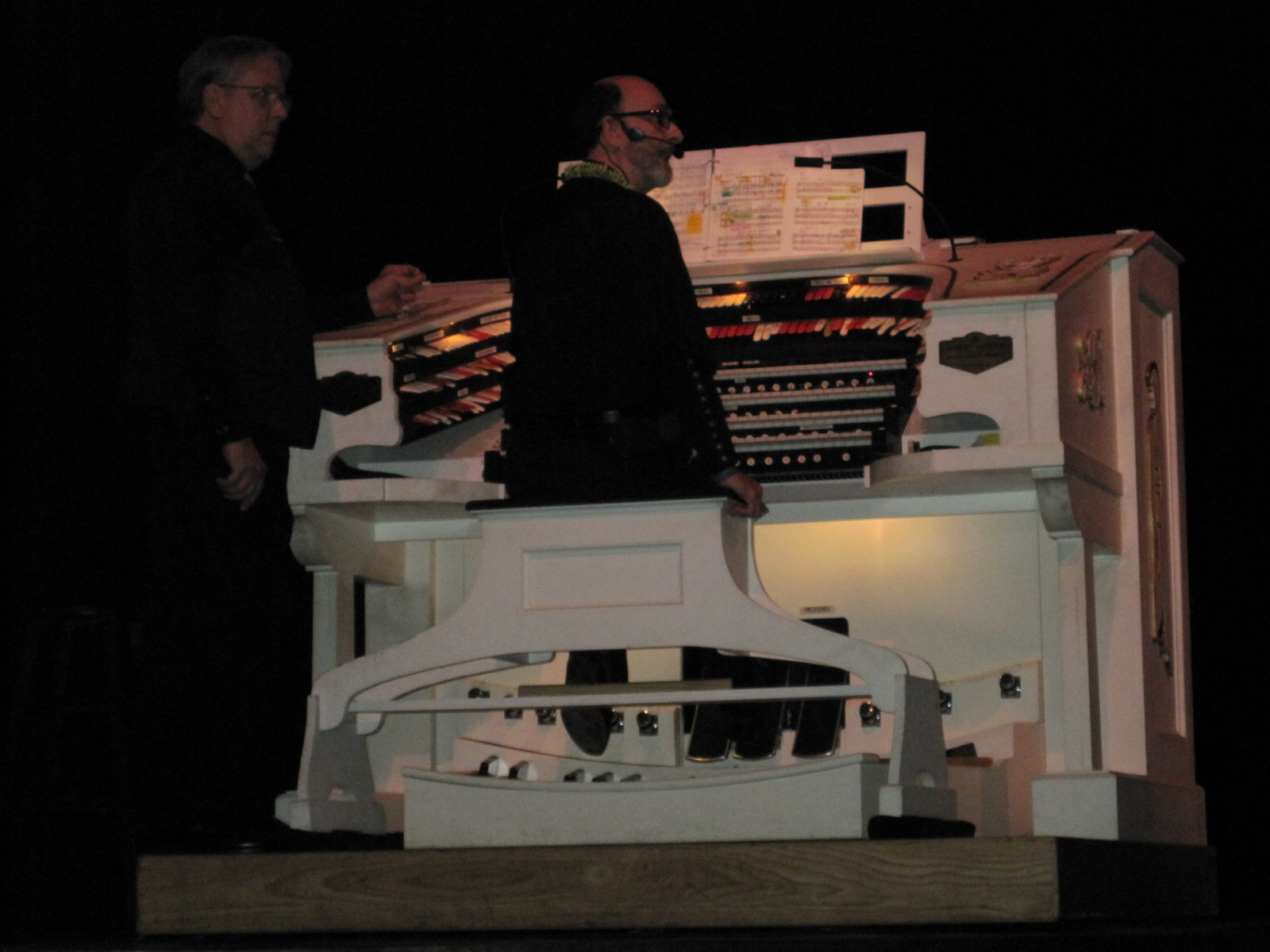
Robert-Morton theatre organ (1922)

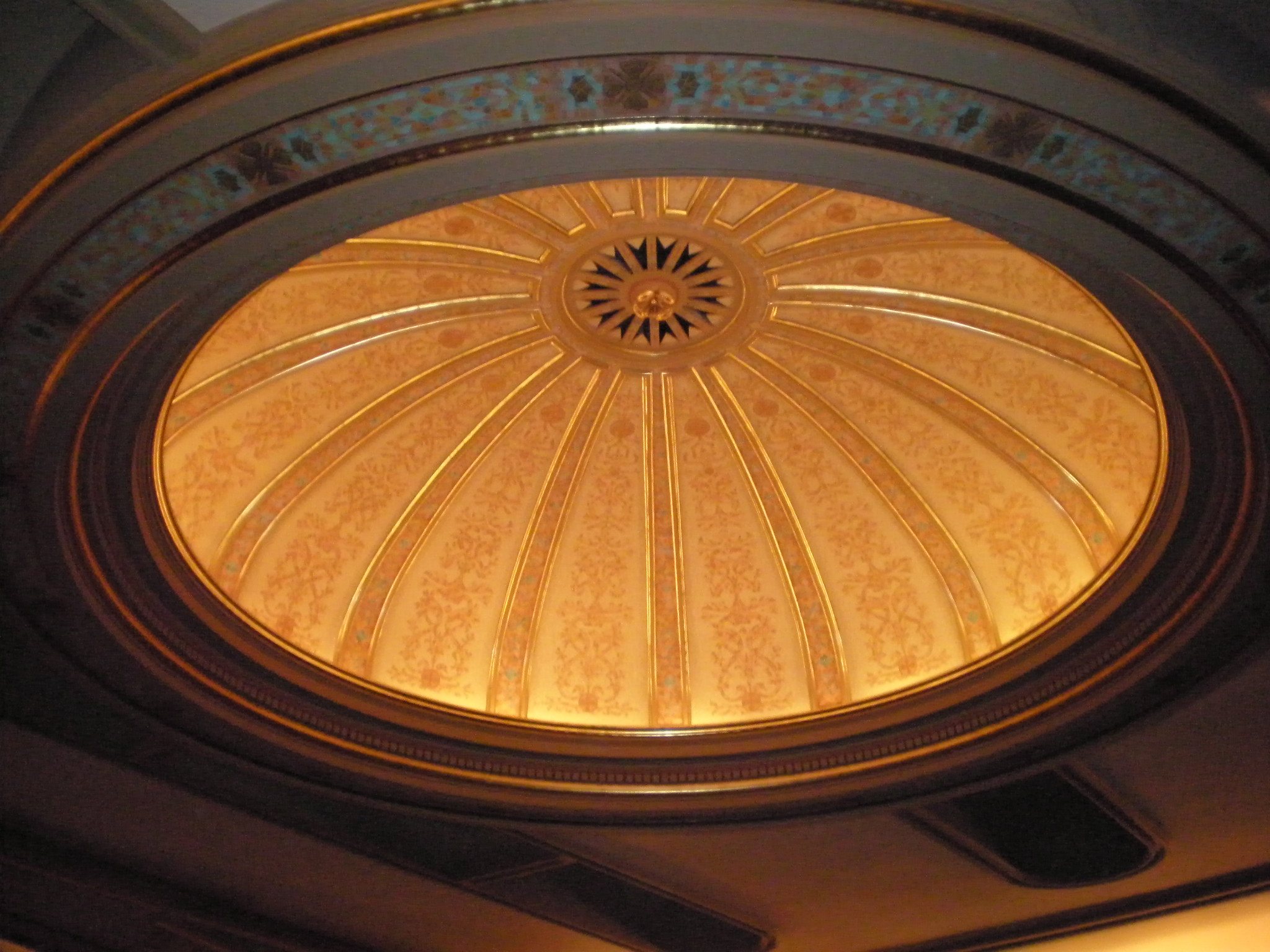
Ceiling dome

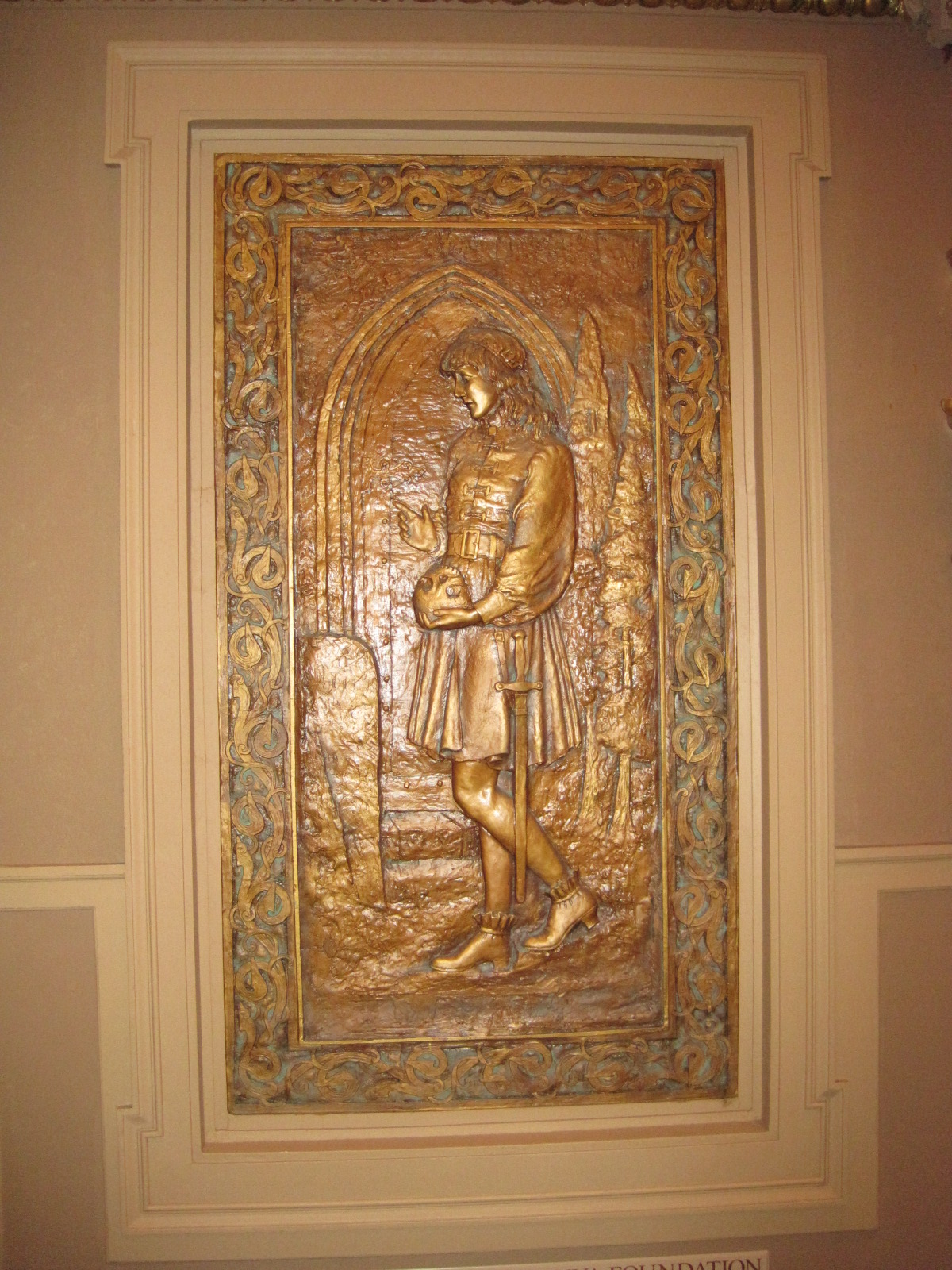
Hamlet in bas-relief in balcony

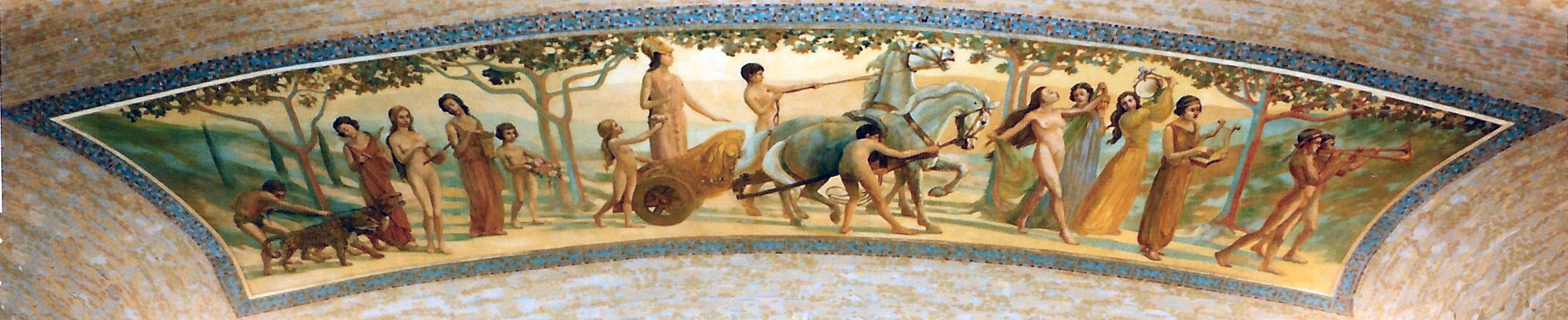
Lionel Waldren mural above proscenium, "The Procession of the Drama"

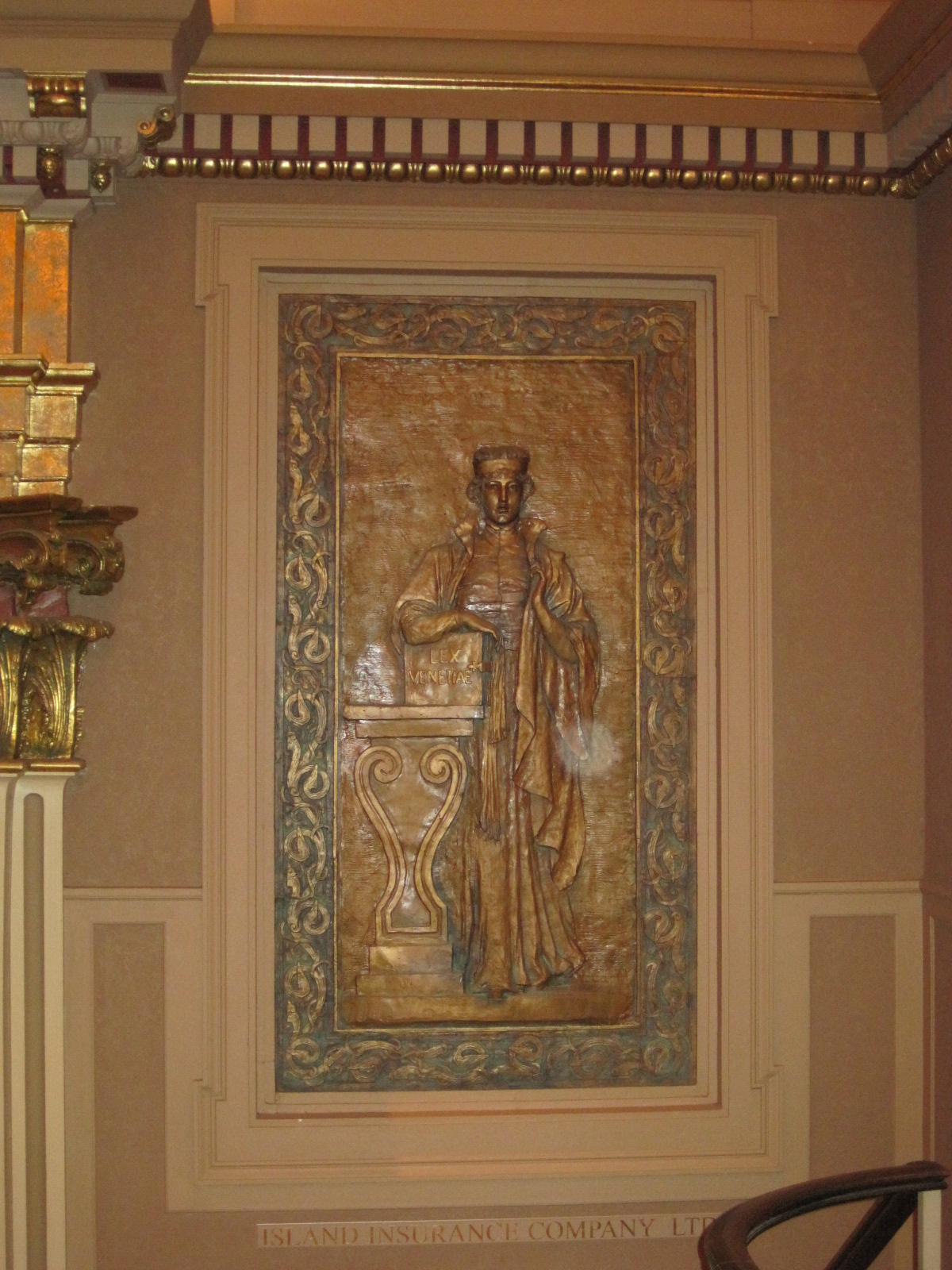
Merchant of Venice in bas-relief in balcony

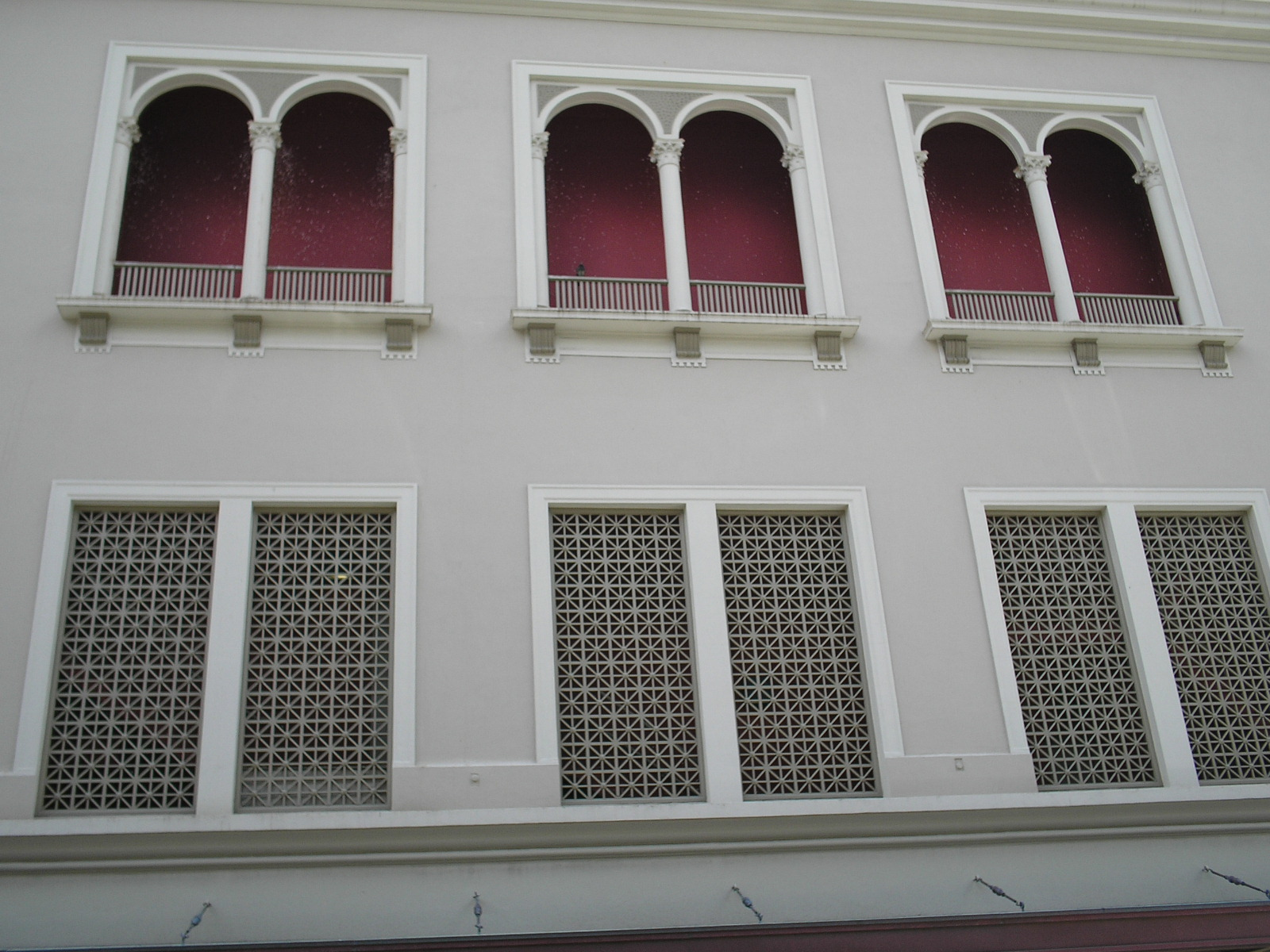
Decorative exterior windows
