= Black Boys Bridge =

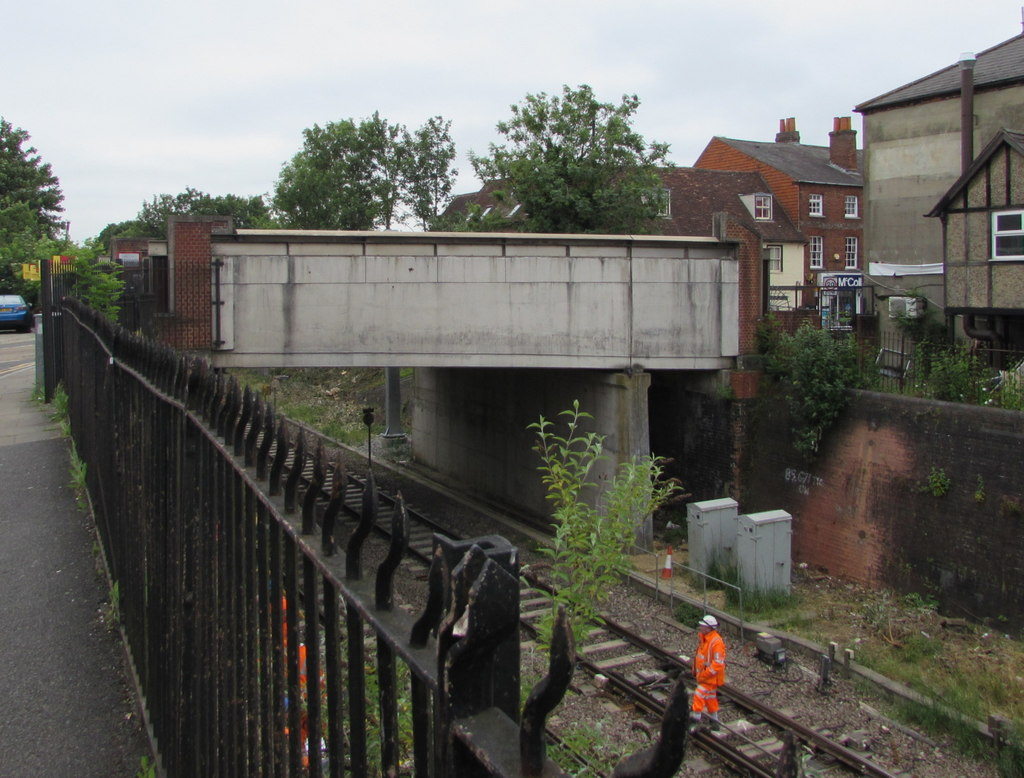
- Coordinates: 51.397305°N 1.326731°W
- Carries: Vehicles, pedestrians
- Crosses: Reading to Taunton line
- Locale: Newbury, Berkshire

Location
- Interactive map of Black Boys Bridge

The Black Boys Bridge is a road bridge in Newbury, Berkshire, England. At the western end of Newbury railway station, the bridge spans the Reading to Taunton line. The bridge has been described as the "southern gateway to Newbury Town Centre".

== History ==
The bridge takes its name from the Black Boys public house on Bartholomew Street, on the south-west side of the bridge. The pub was at this site from at least 1796 and was last recorded in 1931 in Kelly's Directory. The pub is now a beauty salon. Another public house, the Vyne Inn, was on the north-east side of the bridge and dates from the 17th century. Now a nail salon, the building is said to be haunted by a stocky man dressed in a frilled shirt and jerkin.

The bridge was repaired in 1999. The bridge was re-opened in November 1999 by Liberal Democrat councillor David Beckett and local restaurateur Mr. Mirh, who laid the final brick.
