= McCandless Building =

- U.S. National Register of Historic Places
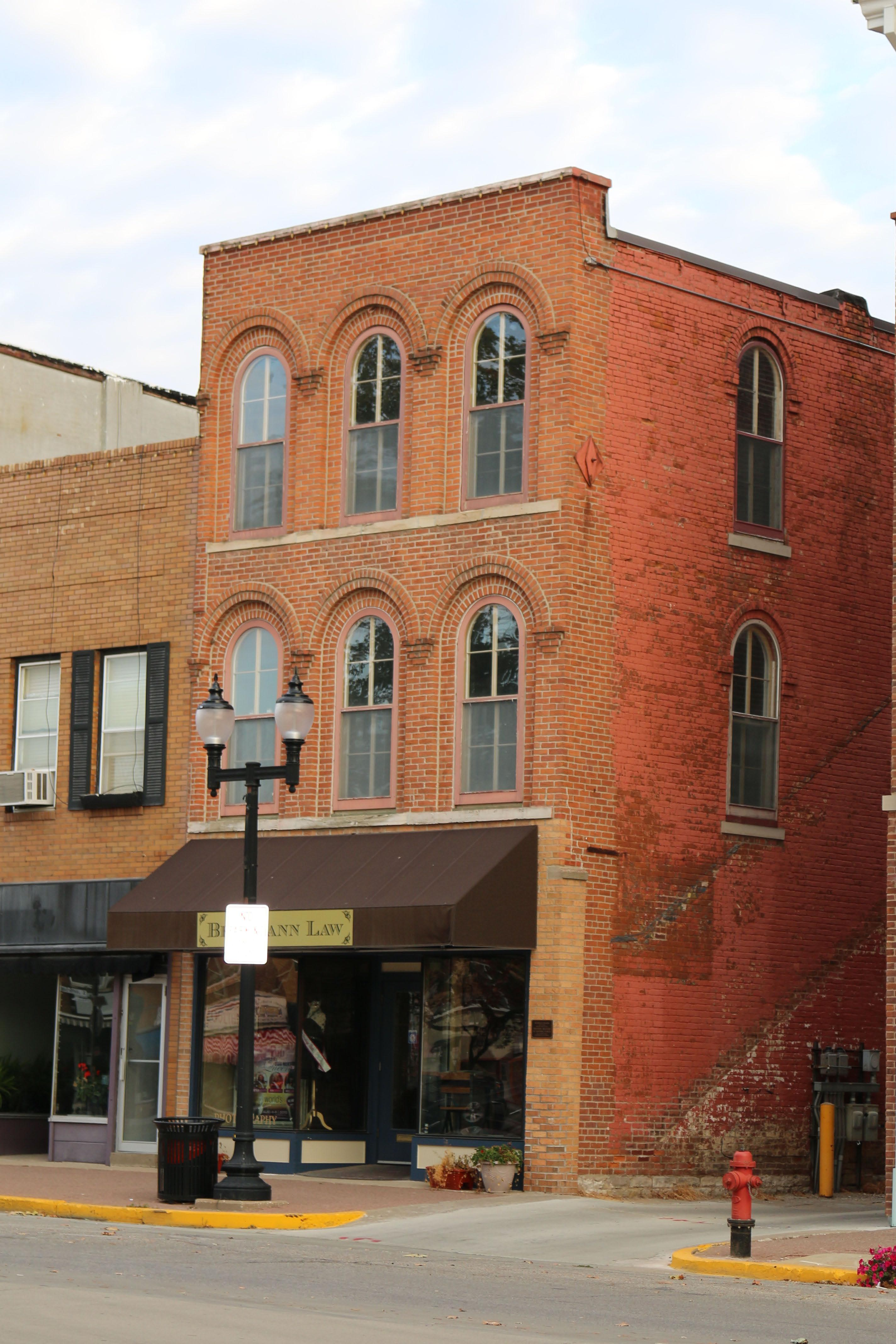

- Location within Iowa Location within the United States
- Location: 115 W. Monroe St. Mount Pleasant, Iowa
- Coordinates: 40°58′0.6″N 91°33′14″W
- Area: less than one acre
- Built: 1862
- Built by: William McCandless
- Architectural style: Italianate
- MPS: Mount Pleasant MPS
- NRHP reference No.: 91001111
- Added to NRHP: September 6, 1991

The McCandless Building is a historic building located in Mount Pleasant, Iowa, United States. This three story brick Italianate structure was built in 1862 by local builder William McCandless. With the arrival of the railroad in 1856, Mount Pleasant was in need of new commercial buildings to house businesses and services that were opening in the expanding town. They were built on the north and east side of the town square. The Italianate was a prominent style used in the city at this time having been used by about a dozen buildings. This buildings features three round arch windows on the second and third floors with brick patterned hood molds. The storefront has been altered slightly, and the heavy wooden cornice that graced the top of the main facade was removed some time ago. The building was listed on the National Register of Historic Places in 1991.
