= Dillingham Transportation Building =

Building in Honolulu, Hawaii, US

- U.S. National Register of Historic Places
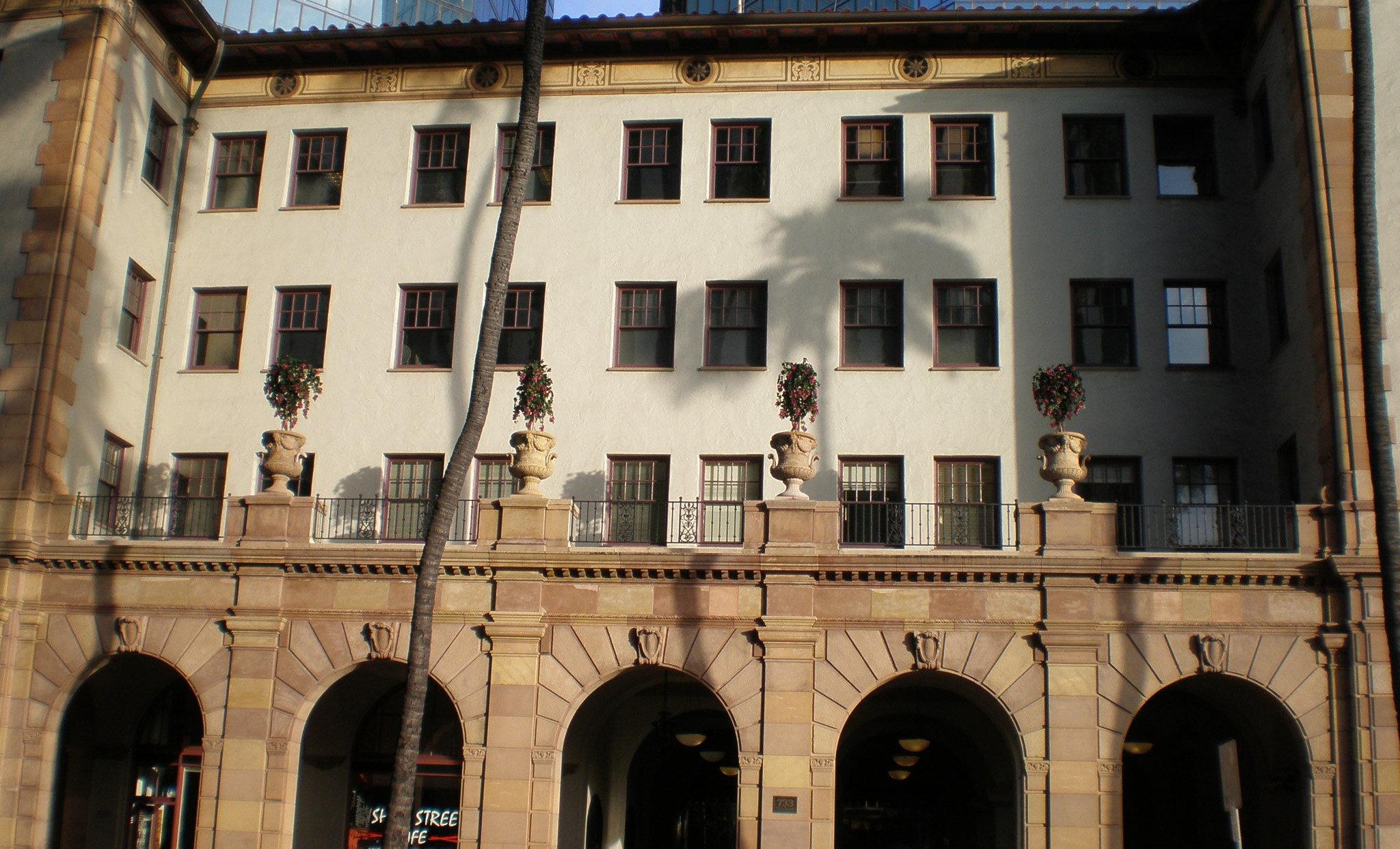

- Location within Hawaii
- Location: 735 Bishop Street, Honolulu, Hawaii
- Coordinates: 21°18′44″N 157°51′54″W
- Built: 1929
- Architect: Lincoln Rogers
- Architectural style: Renaissance Revival
- NRHP reference No.: 79000756
- Added to NRHP: September 7, 1979

The Dillingham Transportation Building was built in 1929 for Walter F. Dillingham of Honolulu, Hawaiʻi, who founded the Hawaiian Dredging Company (later Dillingham Construction) and ran the Oahu Railway and Land Company founded by his father, Benjamin Franklin Dillingham. The building was designed in an Italian Renaissance Revival by architect Lincoln Rogers of Los Angeles, who also designed the Hawaii State Art Museum (1928). It was added to the National Register of Historic Places in 1979 and restored by Architects Hawaiʻi Ltd. in 1980.

== Notable tenants ==
The Territorial Tavern was a restaurant and nightclub established in the building in the early 1970s. The tavern is notable as a starting point for emerging slack-key guitar performers such as Keola Beamer. The Territorial Tavern became a nexus of musical expression during the Second Hawaiian Renaissance, with the addition of acts such as the Brothers Cazimero, The Sons of Hawaii, Eddie Kamae, and Dennis Kamakahi, and others.
