= Royal Brewery =

- U.S. National Register of Historic Places
- U.S. Historic district – Contributing property
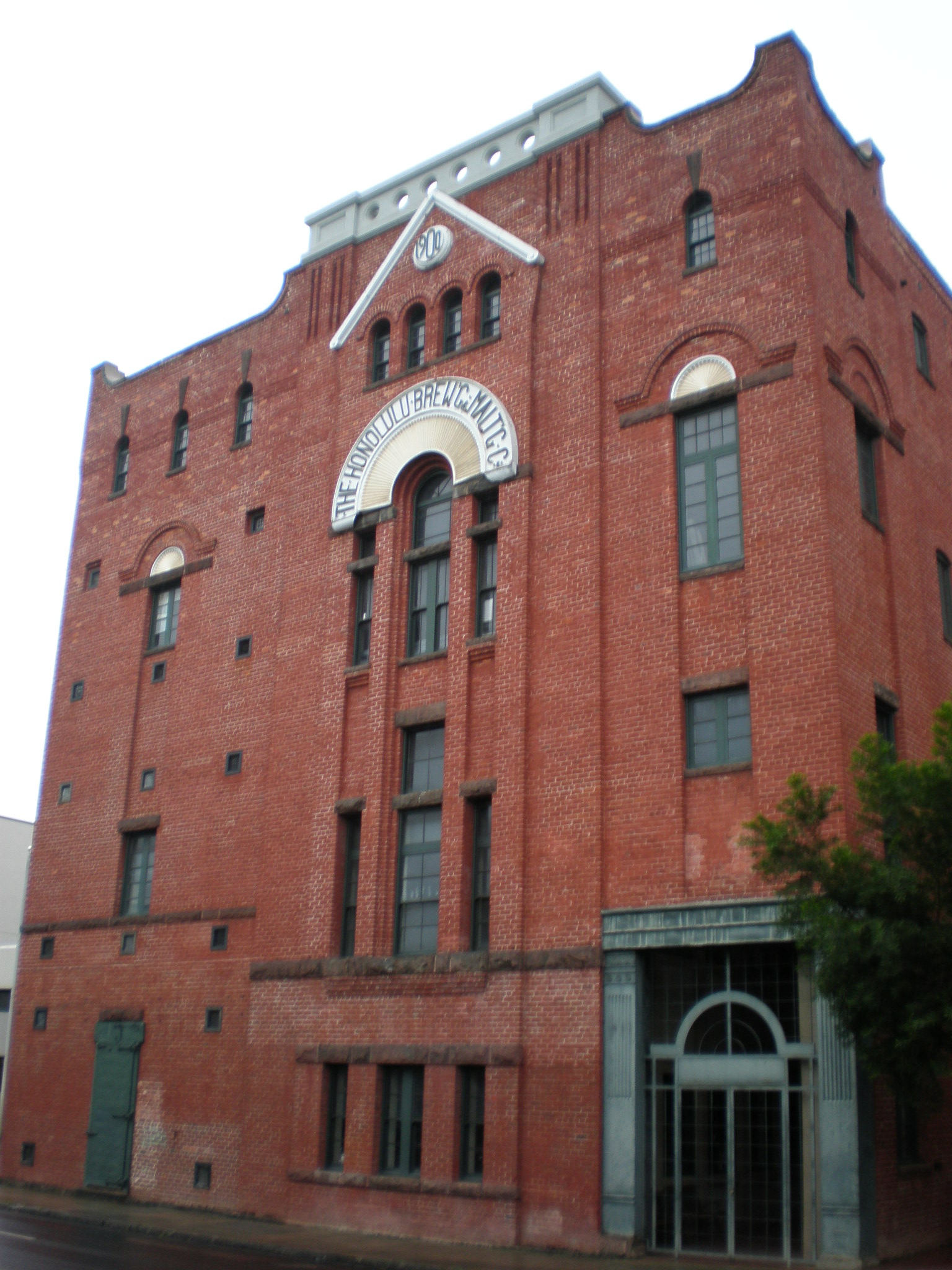
- Oldest Extant Brewery building in Hawaii.

- Location within Hawaii
- Location: 547 Queen Street, Honolulu, Hawaii
- Coordinates: 21°18′12.3″N 157°51′32.5″W
- Built: 1900
- Architect: Hermann Steinmann
- Architectural style: Romanesque Revival
- Part of: Hawaii Capital Historic District (ID78001020)
- NRHP reference No.: 72000421
- Added to NRHP: 1972

The Royal Brewery is a historic former brewery in Honolulu, Hawaii. It features a distinctive decorative facade and is the oldest remaining structure associated with brewing in the state of Hawaii.

== History ==
The building was designed in 1899 by Hermann Steinmann, a New York architect experienced in brewery design for the Honolulu Malting and Brewing Company, in the then-contemporary Romanesque style. the brewery was the most successful brewery in Hawaii since Don Francisco de Paula Marín first recorded brewing a barrel of beer in 1812.

The first beer to enter production was Primo in 1901, and the company received a license in 1903 for "malt liquor".

Prohibition began in 1918 in Oahu, and upon its repeal, the brewery became home to the American Brewing Company. Their first product was Ambrew, later followed by Royal, which remained in near constant production until 1962. A strike in late 1939 and brief war time suspension were the only breaks. In 1960, with declining sales of Royal, American Brewing Company invested $250,000 in a modernization plan. Their efforts were not successful, and the company was out of business by 1963.

After sitting empty, the building was renovated in 1996.

The building is currently home to the Hawaii Community Development Authority.
