= Clinton (disambiguation) =

Clinton is a family name.

Clinton may also refer to:

== Places ==
=== Australia ===
- Clinton, Queensland
- Clinton, South Australia (disambiguation), various places on the Yorke Peninsula
- County of Clinton, Queensland

=== Canada ===
- Clinton, British Columbia
- Clinton, Ontario

=== New Zealand ===
- Clinton, New Zealand

=== United Kingdom ===
- Aston Clinton, a village and civil parish in Buckinghamshire, England
- Baddesley Clinton, a moated manor house near Warwick, England

=== United States ===
- Clinton, Alabama
- Clinton, Arkansas
- Clinton, California, in Amador County
- Clinton, Oakland, California, in Alameda County
- Clinton, Connecticut
  - Clinton (CDP), Connecticut
  - Clinton Village Historic District (Clinton, Connecticut), listed on the NRHP in Connecticut
- Clinton, Georgia
- Clinton, Illinois
  - Clinton Nuclear Generating Station
- Clinton, Indiana, in Vermillion County
- Clinton, Ripley County, Indiana
- Clinton, Iowa
- Clinton, Kansas
- Clinton, Kentucky
- Clinton, Louisiana
- Clinton, Maine, a New England town
  - Clinton (CDP), Maine, the main village in the town
- Clinton, Maryland
- Clinton, Massachusetts, a New England town
  - Clinton (CDP), Massachusetts, the main village in the town
- Clinton, Michigan (disambiguation), several places
- Clinton, Minnesota
- Clinton, Mississippi
- Clinton, Missouri, in Henry County
- Clinton, Phelps County, Missouri
- Clinton, Montana
- Clinton, Nebraska
- Clinton, New Jersey
- Clinton, Manhattan, New York, an alternate name for Hell's Kitchen
- Clinton, Clinton County, New York
- Clinton, Dutchess County, New York
- Clinton, Oneida County, New York
  - Clinton Village Historic District (Clinton, New York)
- Clinton, North Carolina
- Clinton, Ohio
- Clinton, Oklahoma
- Clinton, Pennsylvania
- Clinton, South Carolina
- Clinton, Tennessee
- Clinton, Texas (disambiguation), multiple places
- Clinton, Utah
- Clinton, Virginia
- Clinton, Washington
- Clinton, West Virginia (disambiguation), multiple places
- Clinton, Wisconsin (disambiguation), multiple places
- Clinton Park, Houston, Texas, a neighborhood

=== Other places ===
- Castle Clinton, New York City
- Camp Clinton, a World War II prisoner of war facility in Clinton, Mississippi
- CFB Clinton, a Canadian Forces Base near Clinton, Ontario
- Clinton Correctional Facility, Dannemora, New York
- Clinton Gulch Dam Reservoir, Summit County, Colorado
- Clinton State Park, Kansas
- Clinton River, Michigan
- Clinton Road, West Milford, New Jersey
- Port Clinton, Ohio
- Port Clinton, Pennsylvania
- DeWitt Clinton High School, Bronx, New York
- Success Academy Clinton, former name of Success Academy Hell's Kitchen, part of Success Academy Charter Schools
- Clinton Engineer Works, US government facility that produced enriched uranium for the Manhattan Project during World War II

== Ships ==
- Clinton, a Canadian tug, formerly steamboat Daring
- Clinton (steam ferry), an 1853 steam ferry used on the San Francisco Bay in California
- USS Clinton, multiple ships of the United States Navy

== Botany ==
- Clinton's bulrush is a common name for Trichophorum clintonii, a species of flowering plant native to eastern North America
- Clinton's lily is a common name for Clintonia, a genus of flowering plants native to North America and Asia
- Clinton's wood fern is a common name for Dryopteris clintoniana, a species of fern native to the northern hemisphere

== Other uses ==
- Clinton (automobile), a Canadian automobile built from 1911 to 1912
- Clinton (band), a side project of Cornershop
- Clinton (film), a 2012 biographical film about former President Bill Clinton
- Clintons, British greeting card company
- Clinton (given name)
- Clinton (grape), a variety of grape

== See also ==
- Clinton College (disambiguation)
- Clinton County (disambiguation)
- Clinton Hill (disambiguation)
- Clinton station (disambiguation)
- Clinton Township (disambiguation)
- Glinton (disambiguation)
