= Clinton (given name) =

- Gender: Male

Origin
- Language: Old English
- Meaning: "Town on the River Glyme" or "fenced settlement"

Other names
- Derivative: Clint

Clinton is a given name. It may be shortened informally to Clint. Notable people with the name include:

- Clinton Avery (born 1987), New Zealand racing cyclist
- Clinton Babbitt (1831–1907), American politician from Wisconsin
- Clinton Benjamin (died 2005), Nauruan politician
- Clinton Bennett (born 1955), British-American scholar of religions
- Clinton Black (1894–1963), American football guard
- Clinton Caldwell Boone (1872–1939), African-American minister, dentist and medical missionary
- Clinton D. Boyd (1884–1950), American attorney, judge and politician
- Clinton Browning (born 1962), Australian footballer
- Clinton Burrell (born 1956), American football defensive back
- Clinton Campbell, American construction worker
- Clinton Cerejo, Indian music producer and singer
- Clinton Collamore, American politician
- Clinton Collymore, Guyanese politician
- Clinton Davis (born 1965), American track athlete
- Clinton Day (1847–1916), American architect
- Sir Clinton Driffield, a fictional British detective
- Clinton Eastwood, Jr. (born 1930), better known as Clint Eastwood, American film actor and director
- Clinton B. Fisk (1828–1890), American military officer and politician
- Clinton A. Galbraith (1860–1923), American lawyer and judge
- Clinton Gutherson (born 1994), Australian rugby league player
- Clinton Howe, Australian politician
- Clinton Jones (priest) (1916–2006), American Episcopal priest and gay rights activist
- Clinton Kane (born 1998/1999), Australian singer, songwriter, and musician
- Clinton Kelly (disambiguation), multiple people
- Clinton Liberty (born 1998), Irish actor
- Clinton McCullough (1844–1895), American politician and lawyer from Maryland
- Clinton Morrison (born 1979), English-Irish footballer
- Clinton Okerlund, American politician
- Clinton Portis (born 1981), American football running back
- Clinton Briggs Ripley (1840s–1920s), American architect
- Clinton Solomon (born 1983), American football wide receiver
- Clinton Warrington Stanley (1830–1884), Justice of the New Hampshire Supreme Court
- Clinton Stringfellow (1905–1959), New Zealand rugby union player
- Clinton D. Vernon (1907–1987), American politician from Utah
- Clinton Watson (1888–1958), American politician from Missouri
- Clinton Richard Dawkins (born 1941), birth name of English ethologist and evolutionary biologist Richard Dawkins
- Clinton Toopi (born 1980), New Zealand professional rugby player

For people with the surname, see Clinton. For places named Clinton, see Clinton (disambiguation).
