= Glinton =

Glinton may refer to:

- Glinton, Cambridgeshire

== People with the surname ==
- Duane Glinton
- Gavin Glinton

== See also ==
- Clinton (surname)
- Clinton (disambiguation)
