= Charles Reed Bishop =

American businessman, politician, and philanthropist (1822–1915)

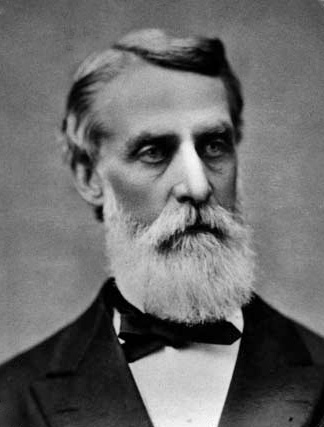

Minister of Foreign Affairs, Kingdom of Hawaii
- In office January 10, 1873 – February 17, 1874
- Monarch: Lunalilo
- Preceded by: Ferdinand William Hutchison
- Succeeded by: William Lowthian Green

Personal details
- Born: January 25, 1822 Glens Falls, New York, United States
- Died: June 7, 1915 (aged 93) San Francisco, California, United States
- Resting place: Royal Mausoleum of Hawaii
- Spouse: Bernice Pauahi Pākī (m. 1850; died 1884)
- Children: Keolaokalani Davis (hānai)
- Occupation: Businessman; banker; politician

Charles Reed Bishop (January 25, 1822 – June 7, 1915) was an American businessman, politician, and philanthropist in Hawaii. Born in Glens Falls, New York, he sailed to Hawaii in 1846 at the age of 24, and made his home there, marrying into the royal family of the kingdom. He served several monarchs in appointed positions in the kingdom, before its overthrow in 1893 by Americans from the United States and organization as the Territory of Hawaii.

Bishop was one of the first trustees of and a major donor to the Kamehameha Schools, founded by his late wife's request to provide education to Hawaiian children. He founded Hawaii's first successful bank, now known as First Hawaiian Bank. Based on his business success, he also founded the Bernice Pauahi Bishop Museum, named for his late wife.

== Early life ==
On January 25, 1822, Charles Reed Bishop was born to Maria (Reed) and Samuel Bishop in Glen Falls, New York. His father was a toll collector for ship traffic on the Hudson River near the town. Charles' mother Maria died two weeks after giving birth to her next son, Henry. Their father Samuel Bishop died when Charles was four, and the boy was taken in by his grandfather on his 125-acre (0.51 km^{2}) farm in Warrensburg and, by 15, was working for Nelson J. Warren in the town's largest store. Charles Bishop worked on his grandfather's farm, learning how to care for sheep, cattle, and horses. While living with his grandfather, Bishop was baptized in a Methodist church.

Bishop spent his early years of education at a village school, and finished his formal schooling at 8th grade, as was customary for many boys in that period. Bishop was hired as a clerk and soon started working for Nelson J. Warren, who headed the largest mercantile company in Warrensburg.

He befriended William Little Lee (1821–1857) from nearby Hudson Falls, then called Sandy Hill. Charles' paternal uncle Linus Bishop married Lee's sister Eliza. After attending Harvard Law School, Lee persuaded Bishop to go with him to the Oregon Territory for new opportunities.

== In Hawaii ==
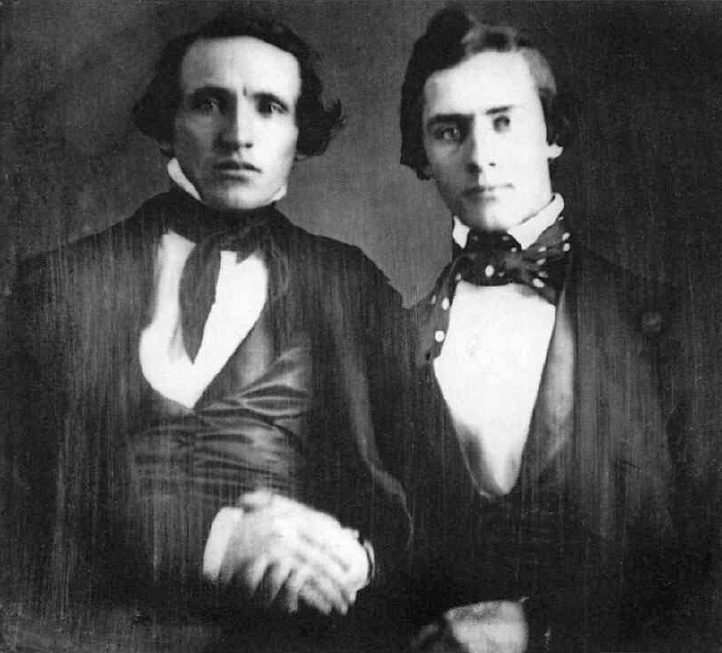
Bishop (right) with William Little Lee, 1846

The two young men sailed for Oregon on the Henry out of New York City, leaving February 23, 1846. By October the ship had rounded Cape Horn and needed to stop in Honolulu for provisions. At this time, the islands were still governed by the Kingdom of Hawaiʻi, but numerous Americans were settling there for business opportunities and as missionaries. Lee was recruited to stay as the second western-trained lawyer in the Hawaiian islands; he was later appointed as the first Chief Justice of the Supreme Court. Bishop decided to stay as well. He soon was hired by some Americans to sort out the failed land deal of Ladd & Co., which was the first major formal law proceeding. He next worked for the U.S. Consul.

On February 27, 1849, Bishop became accepted as a citizen of the Kingdom of Hawaii. He became an investor with Henry A. Peirce and Lee in a sugarcane plantation on the island of Kauaʻi, near where the Ladd company had been somewhat successful. From 1849 to 1853 he served as Collector General of Customs.

On June 4, 1850, he married Bernice Pauahi Pākī of the royal House of Kamehameha, despite her initial resistance and the objections of her parents. Their private ceremony in the Royal School was not attended by her family. Within a year, her father Pākī made peace with the marriage and invited the couple to live on the family estate of Haleakala.

Bishop formed a partnership with William A. Aldrich, selling merchandise to be shipped to supply the California Gold Rush. He became known as a trusted person with whom traders could deposit and exchange the various currencies in use at the time.

In 1853, Bishop was elected as representative to the legislature of the Hawaiian Kingdom.

=== Bank ===
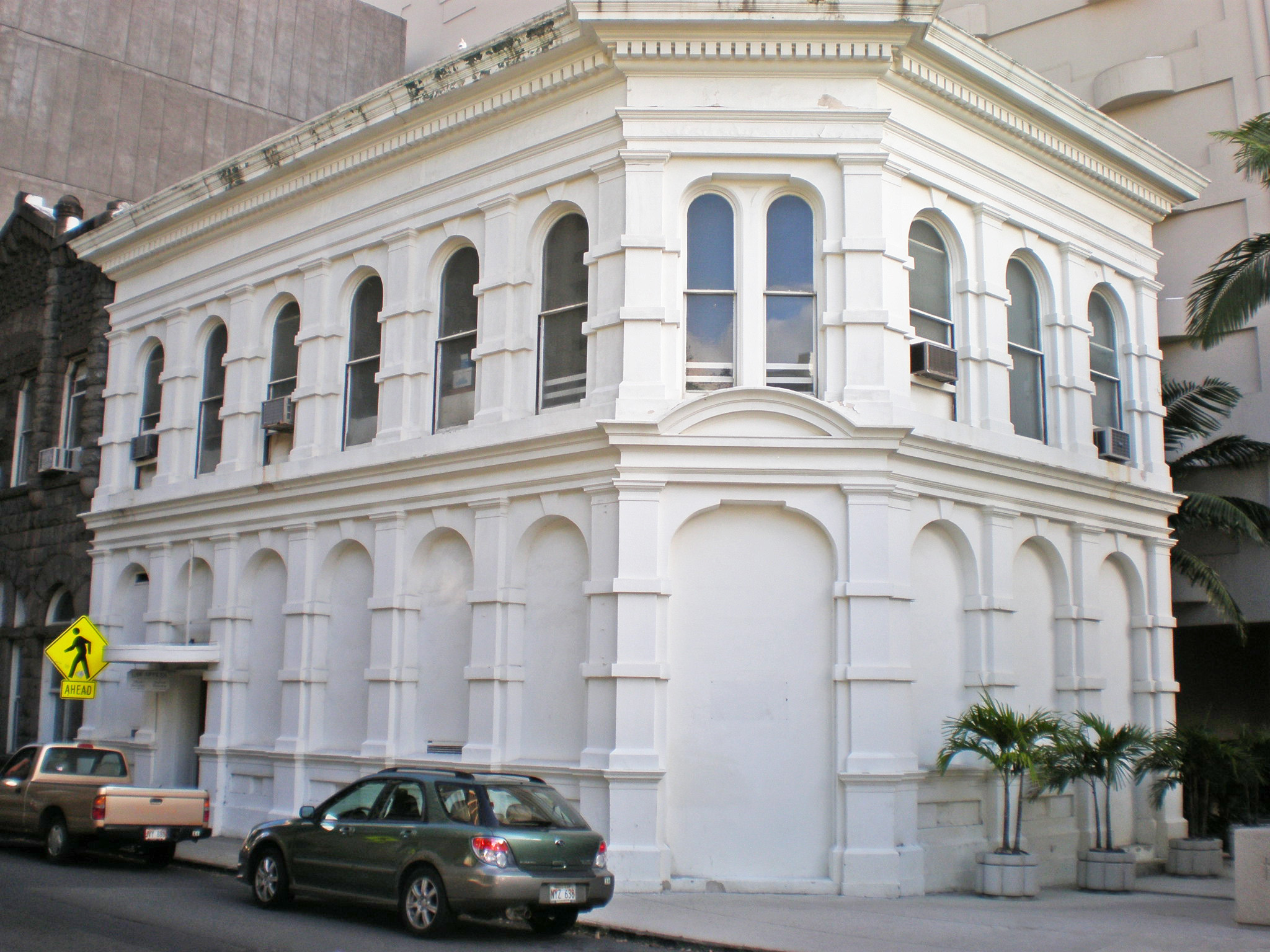
Bishop Bank, built in 1878

On August 17, 1858, Aldrich split off the shipping business. Bishop founded Bishop & Co. as the first chartered bank in the Kingdom. It is the second oldest bank west of the Rocky Mountains. On its first day, it took in $4784.25 in deposits. By 1878, it outgrew its basement room and expanded to a two-story building. This structure is designated as a contributing property to the Merchant Street Historic District, listed on the National Register of Historic Places in 1972.

In 1895 Bishop sold the bank to Samuel Mills Damon (1841–1924), son of American missionary Samuel C. Damon (1815–1885). Over time the bank grew and in 1960 was renamed as First Hawaiian Bank, formalizing its role in state history.

=== Service ===
Bishop served on the Privy Council for five Hawaiian monarchs from 1859 to 1891, and was appointed to the House of Nobles from 1859 to 1886 by King Kamehameha IV. From 1869 to 1891, he served as an appointee to the Board of Education. During the brief reign of King Lunalilo, he was Minister of Foreign Affairs from January 10, 1873, to February 17, 1874.

Bishop was one of the first trustees of and major donor to the Kamehameha Schools, founded at his late wife's bequest to provide education to Hawaiian children. He was also a founder of the Bernice Pauahi Bishop Museum, which he named after his late wife. Bishop hired William Tufts Brigham, whom he had met on a scientific visit in 1864 with Horace Mann Jr., to be the museum's first director. He also donated funds for buildings at the private Punahou School. Bishop was elected and served as president of the Honolulu Chamber of Commerce 1883–1885 and 1888–1894.

After the overthrow of the Kingdom of Hawaii, in 1893, Bishop left Hawaii in 1894 and settled in San Francisco, California. He became vice-president of the Bank of California, serving until his death on June 7, 1915. He stayed involved in his Hawaiian estate affairs from California. For example, he hired architects Clinton Briggs Ripley and Charles William Dickey to design a new building for the Bishop Estate headquarters, and for Pauahi Hall on the Punahou School campus.

== Death ==
Bishop died in 1915 at the age of 93 in San Francisco, California. His ashes were returned to Hawaii, and interred next to his wife in the Kamehameha Crypt of the Royal Mausoleum of Hawaii at Mauna ‘Ala.

A major street cutting through Bishop property in downtown Honolulu at 21°18′32″N 157°51′38″W was named Bishop.

== See also ==
- Bernice P. Bishop Museum
- Mid-Pacific Institute
- The Queen's Medical Center
- Kamehameha Schools
- Punahou School
- First Hawaiian Bank

Government offices
| Preceded by Ferdinand William Hutchison | Kingdom of Hawaii Minister of Foreign Affairs; 1873–1874 | Succeeded by William Lowthian Green |
