= Clinton Village Historic District =

Clinton Village Historic District may refer to:

- Clinton Village Historic District (Clinton, Connecticut), listed on the NRHP in Connecticut
- Clinton Village Historic District (Clinton, New York), listed on the NRHP in New York

== See also ==
- Clinton (disambiguation)
