= Collamore =

Collamore is a surname. Notable people with the surname include:

- Allan Collamore (1887–1980), American professional baseball pitcher
- Amanda Collamore, American politician
- Brian Collamore (born 1950), American politician
- Clinton Collamore, American politician

== See also ==
- Collymore
