= Merchant Street Historic District =

Historic district in Hawaii, United States

- U.S. National Register of Historic Places
- U.S. Historic district
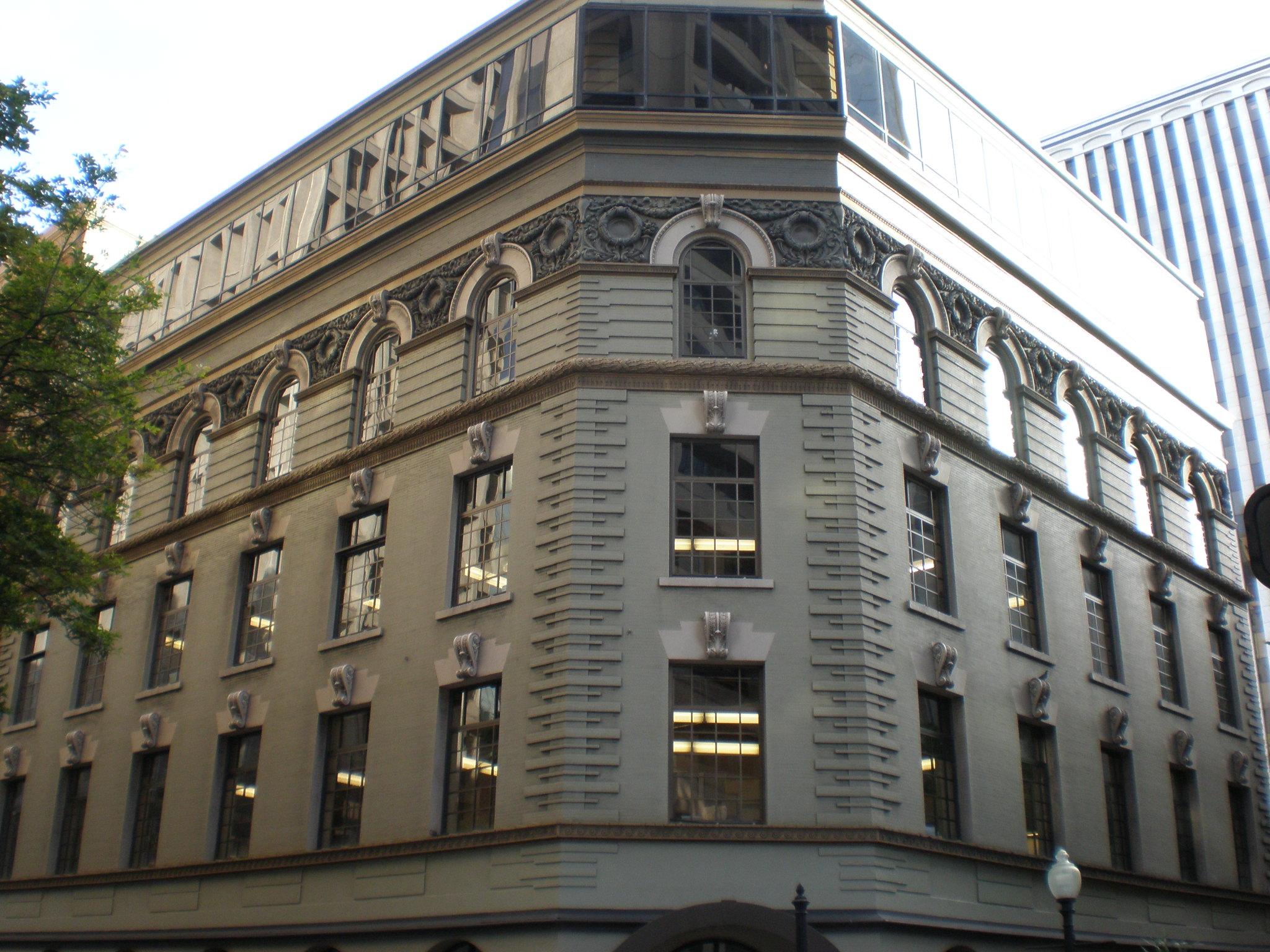
- Judd Building, built 1898 (photo taken 2009)

- Location within Hawaii
- Location: Roughly along Merchant St. from Nuuanu Ave. to Fort St., Honolulu, Hawaii
- Coordinates: 21°18′33″N 157°51′47″W
- Area: 7 acres (2.8 ha)
- Built: 1850s to 1930s
- Architect: Various
- Architectural style: Varied
- NRHP reference No.: 73000661
- Added to NRHP: June 19, 1973

The Merchant Street Historic District in Honolulu, Hawaii, was the city's earliest commercial center.

== Location ==
Bounded roughly by Fort Street at the southeast end and Nuʻuanu Avenue at the northwest, its older, low-rise, brick and stone buildings, surrounded by contemporary, concrete high rises, serves as an open-air, human-scale architectural museum of the city's commercial development between the 1850s and the 1930s. Its architectural styles range from nondescript 19th-century commercial through Richardsonian Romanesque, Italianate, and Mission Revival. It was added to the National Register of Historic Places in 1973. Directly to the north is Chinatown, another historic district.

== Notable buildings ==
=== Melchers (1854) ===
The earliest structure is Melchers Building at 51 Merchant Street, built in 1854 for the retail firm of Melchers and Reiner. Its original coral stone walls are no longer visible under its layers of stucco and paint, and it now houses city government offices, not private businesses.

=== Kamehameha V Post Office (1871) ===
The Kamehameha V Post Office at the corner of Merchant and Bethel Streets was the first building in Hawaiʻi to be constructed entirely of precast concrete blocks reinforced with iron bars. It was built by J.G. Osborne in 1871 and the success of this new method was replicated on a much grander scale the next year in the royal palace, Aliʻiōlani Hale. The old post office building was separately added to the National Register of Historic Places in 1972.

=== Bishop Bank (1878) ===
The Bishop Bank Building at 63 Merchant Street was the earliest of the Italianate (or Renaissance Revival) structures on the street, built in 1878 and designed by Thomas J. Baker (one of the architects of ʻIolani Palace). Its distinctive features include a corner entrance, arched windows and doors, fine masonry work, and brick pilasters below an ornamental cornice and parapet along the roofline, all of which are obscured to some extent by its current exterior of monotone white stucco. In 1925, Bishop Bank moved to much larger quarters along "Bankers Row" on Bishop Street, and later changed its name to First Hawaiian Bank, now one of the largest in the state.

=== T.R. Foster Building (1891) ===
The T.R. Foster Building at 902 Nuʻuanu Avenue was built by Thomas R. Foster, one of the founders (in 1882) of the Inter-Island Steam Navigation Company. In 1880, Foster had purchased the estate of the renowned botanist William Hillebrand (1821–1886), which was bequeathed to the city as Foster Botanical Garden at the death of his wife, Mary E. Foster (née Robinson), in 1930.

The architectural style of the two-story T.R. Foster Building resembles that of the one-story Royal Saloon Building across the street, which was built in 1890 on the site of a former corner bar. Both are modestly Italianate brick buildings, with pilasters, cornices, and balustrades along the streetside rooflines. The Royal Saloon ceased to be a bar during Prohibition, but both buildings were renovated during the 1970s and now house O'Toole's Irish Pub and Murphy's Bar & Grill.

=== Bishop Estate (1896) ===
The bare stone face of the tiny Bishop Estate Building at 71 Merchant Street is a fine example of the stolid Richardsonian Romanesque style that was popular when it was built in 1896. Its architects were Clinton Briggs Ripley and his junior partner, C.W. Dickey, a well-connected local boy with a fresh degree in architecture from M.I.T., and it initially housed the executive offices of not only the Bishop Estate, but also the Charles Reed Bishop Trust and the Bernice P. Bishop Museum. Constructed of dark lava from the Estate's own quarries, its notable features include arches above the lower door and window frames, four rough stone pilasters on the upper level, and a corniced parapet along the roofline.

=== Judd Building (1898) ===
The Judd Building at the corner of Merchant and Fort Streets combines elegant features of Italianate architecture with businesslike functionalism. Designed by Oliver G. Traphagen, newly arrived from Duluth, Minnesota, it boasted Hawaii's first passenger elevator when it opened in 1898. A fifth floor was added on top in the 1920s, the interior was remodeled in 1979, and the ground floor has also been reconfigured. However, the exterior of the middle three floors reflects Traphagen's original design, with arched windows, simulated keystones, and decorative wreaths and floral designs. Built on land that used to house the medical offices of Dr. Gerrit P. Judd, the new building served as the first headquarters of Alexander & Baldwin, and also of the Bank of Hawaii until 1927. The bank bought the building in 1998, and A&B repurchased it in 2000.

=== Yokohama Specie Bank (1909) ===
Overseas branches of the Yokohama Specie Bank (横浜正金銀行 Yokohama Shōkin Ginkō, est. 1880) were chartered to act as agents of Imperial Japan. The Honolulu branch was the first successful Japanese bank in Hawaiʻi. The building at 36 Merchant Street dates from 1909 and was designed by one of Honolulu's most prolific architects, Henry Livingston Kerr, who considered it not just his own finest work, but the finest in the city at the time. The brick and steel structure is L-shaped, with a corner entrance and a courtyard in back. Its Italianate design includes a triumphal arch over the main door, copper window casings, glass wainscoting, marble trim, and paintings inside by a local artist. Bank personnel received Japanese-speaking, Chinese-speaking, and English-speaking customers in separate areas.

On the day that Pearl Harbor was bombed, the building was taken over by the Alien Property Custodian, the first floor became a warehouse for confiscated possessions, and extra showers, toilets, and holding cells were installed in the basement to accommodate up to 250 drunken military personnel. The bank's former customers spent years trying to get their money back, and never managed to collect interest on their old deposits until the 1960s.

The building was renovated in the 1980s by local restoration architect Spencer Leineweber and became home to Honolulu Magazine from 1982 to 2001. It currently serves as a preschool and childcare center.

=== Honolulu Police Station (1931) ===
The last significant old structure in the district was the old Honolulu Police Station at 842 Bethel Street, which occupies the whole block of Merchant Street between Bethel Street and Nuuanu Avenue. Built in 1931 at a cost of $235,000, it replaced an earlier brick building on the same site that dated from 1885, during the era of the notorious Walter Murray Gibson, so the new structure is also known as the Walter Murray Gibson Building. Architect Louis Davis designed it in a Spanish Mission Revival style that matches very well that of the newly built city hall, Honolulu Hale (1929). (Davis had designed the ornately Chinese New Palama Theatre two years earlier. It was leased in the 1970s to show Filipino films and renamed Zamboanga Theatre.) Building materials include 11 tons of marble from France, mahogany from the Philippines, and sandstone from Waianae. It served as the headquarters of the Honolulu Police Department until the latter moved to the old Sears building in Pawaʻa in 1967. It was renovated in the 1980s and now houses other city offices.

== Gallery ==
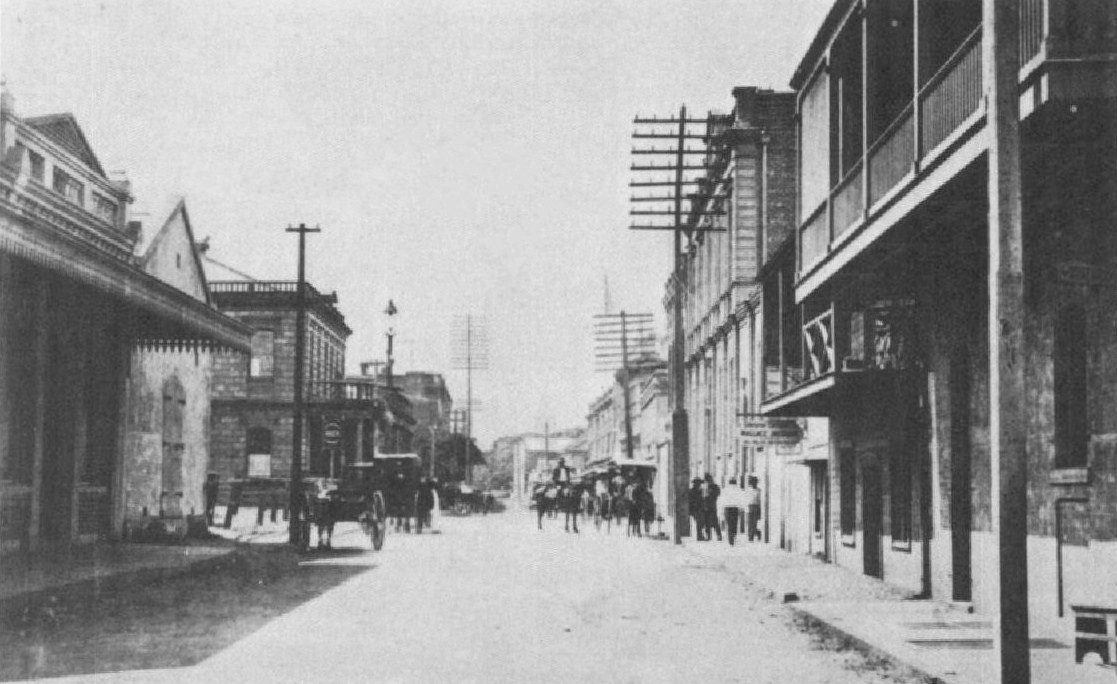
A photograph of Merchant Street in the 1890s

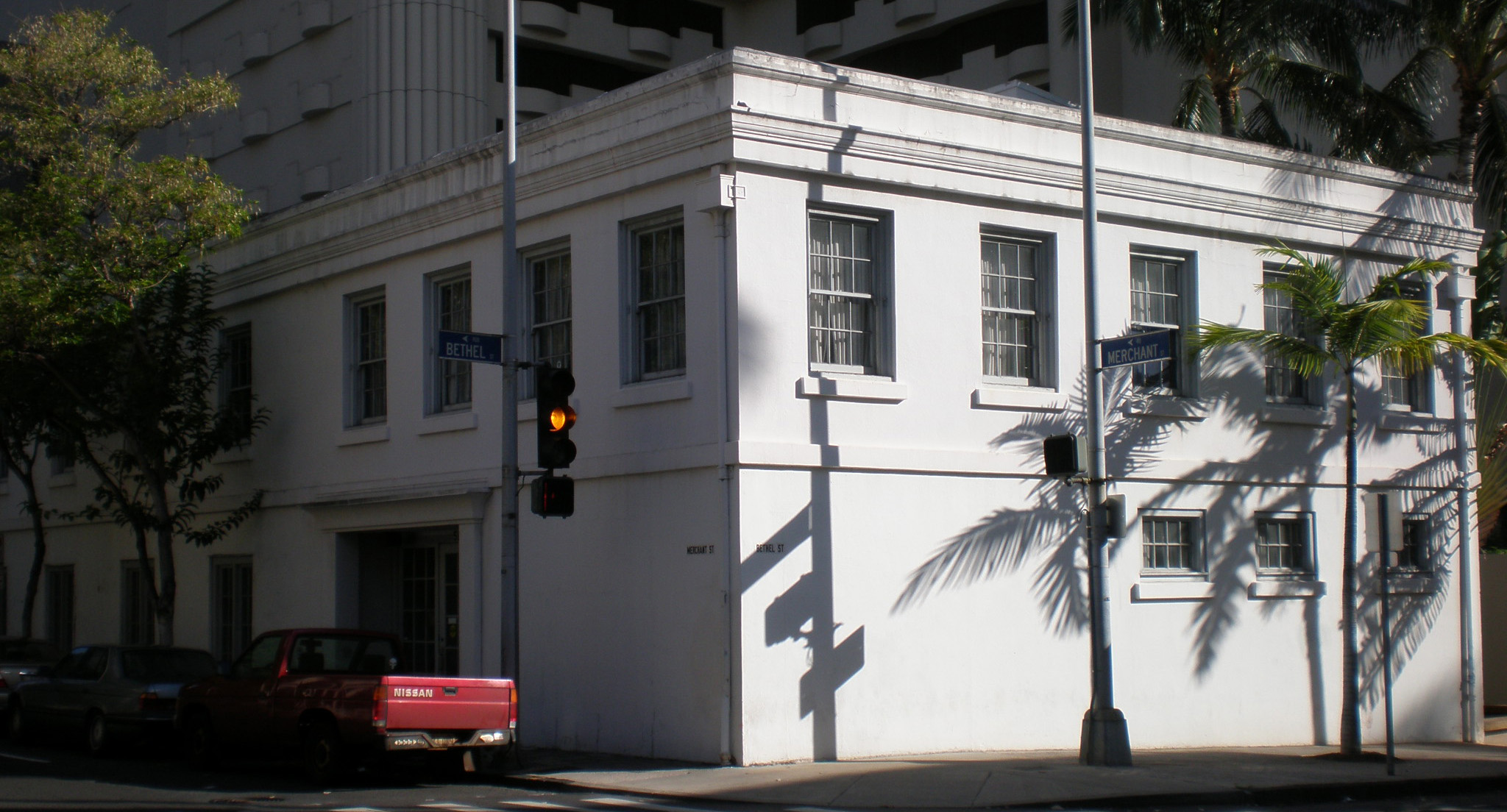
Melcher Building, 1854

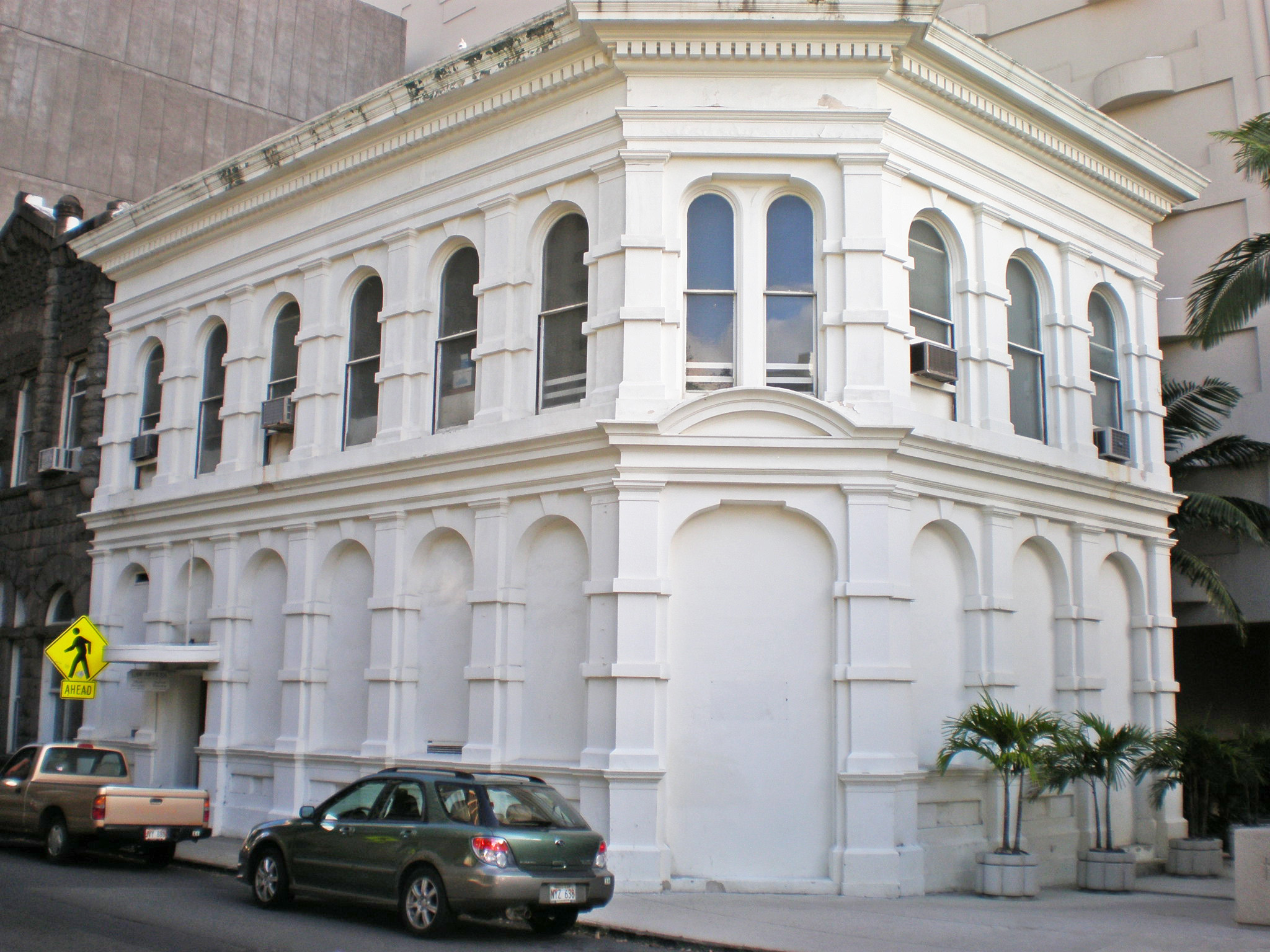
Bishop Bank Building, 1878

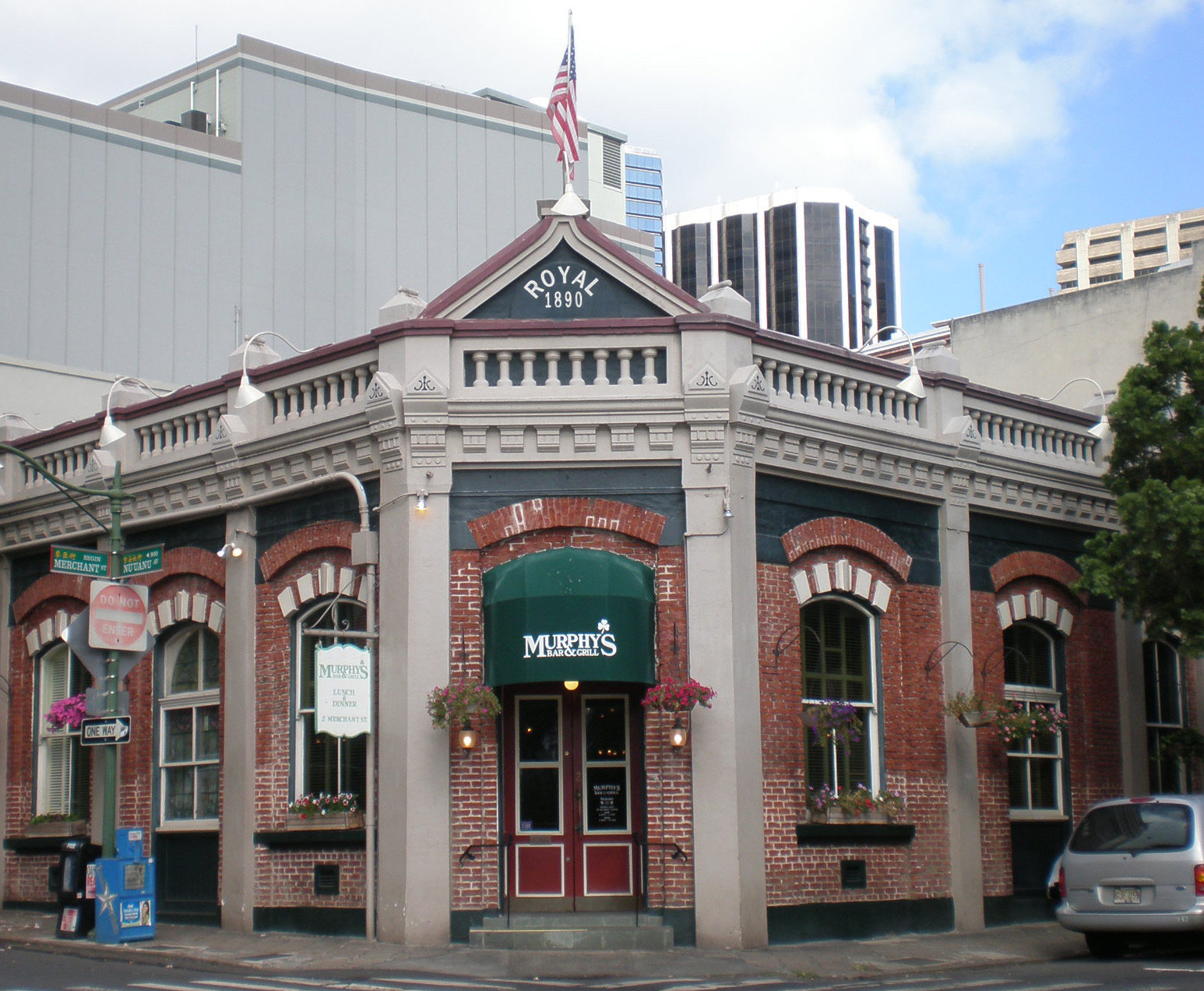
Royal Saloon Building, 1890

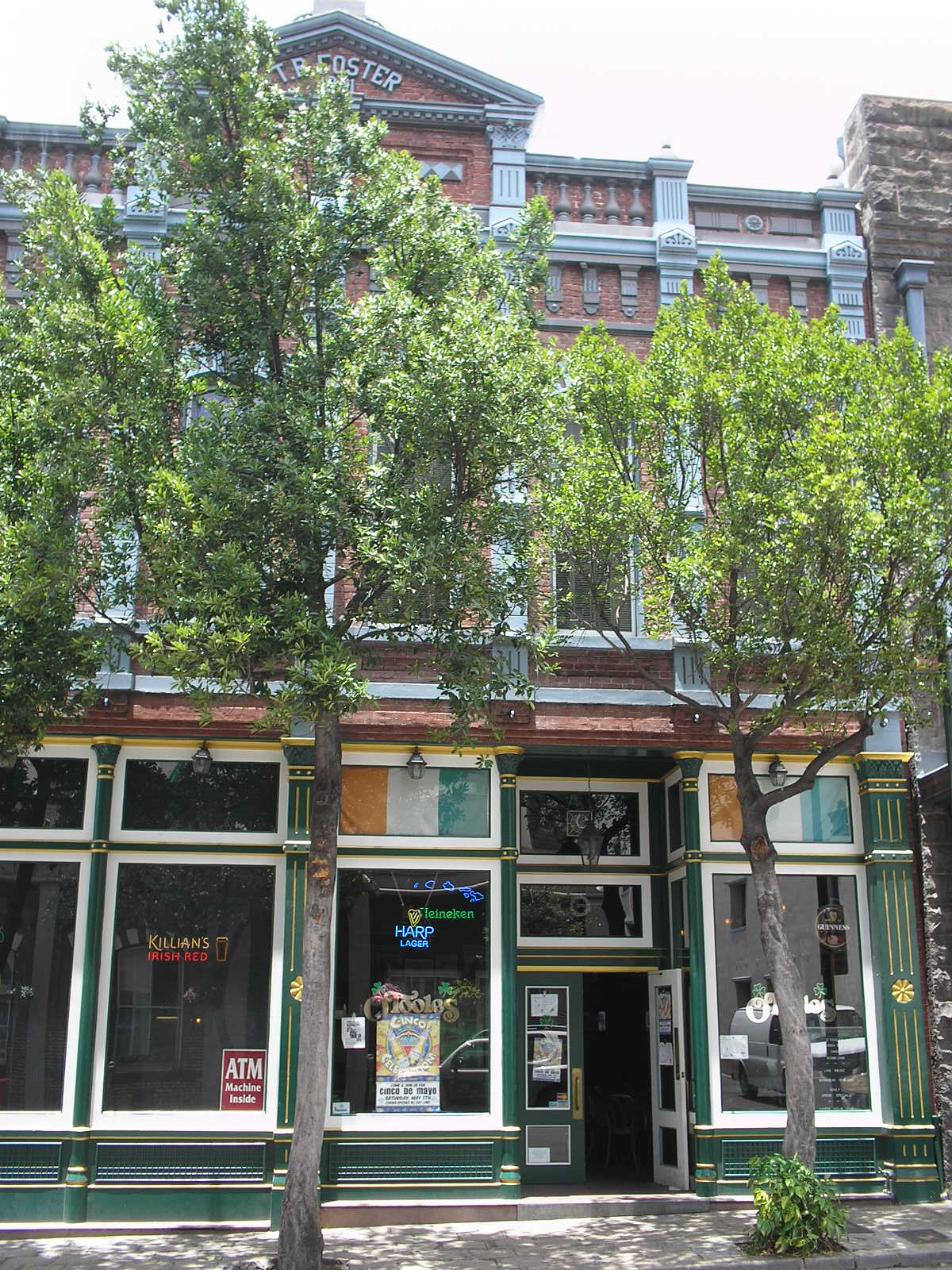
T.R. Foster Building, 1891

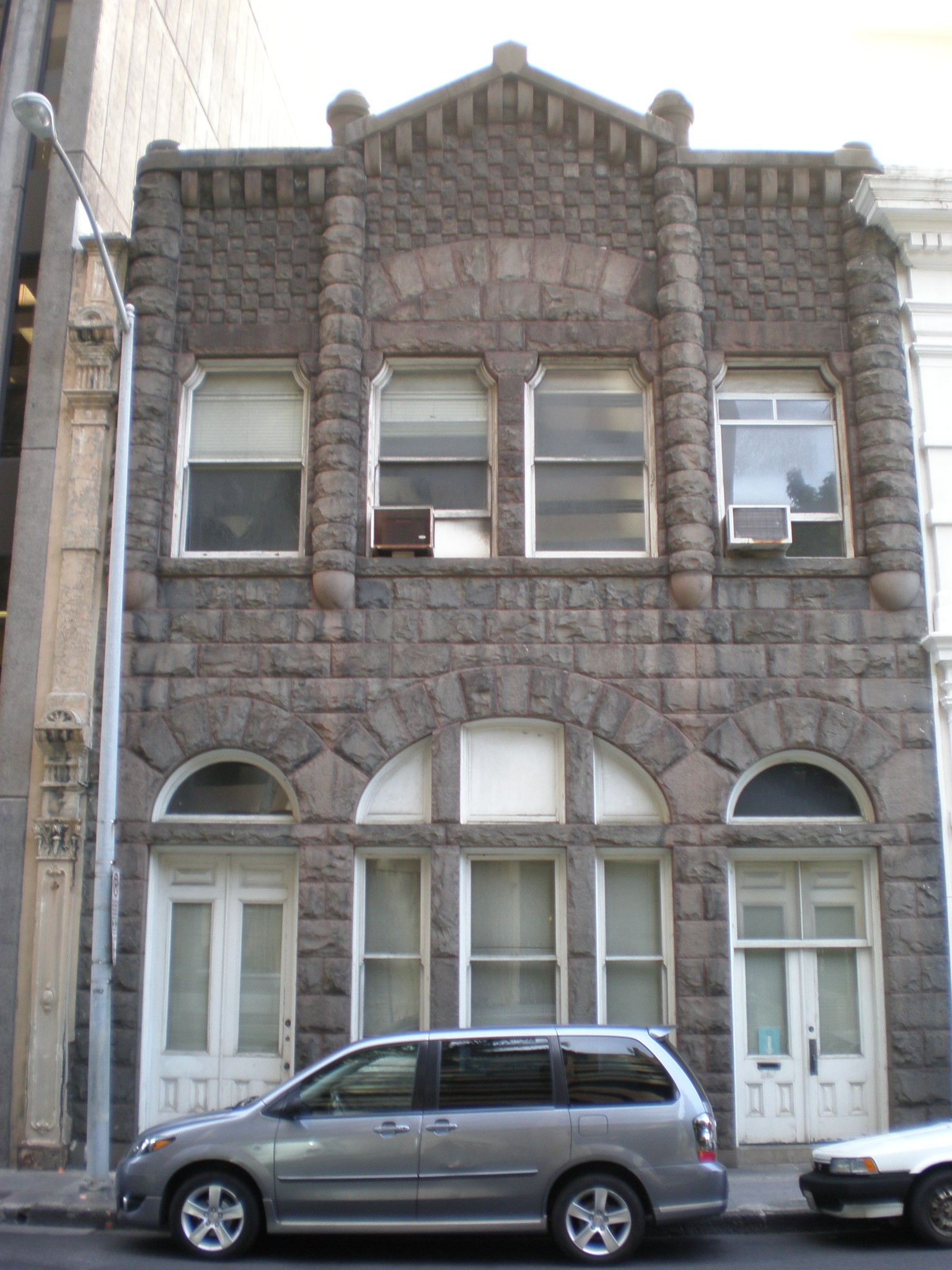
Bishop Estate Building, 1896

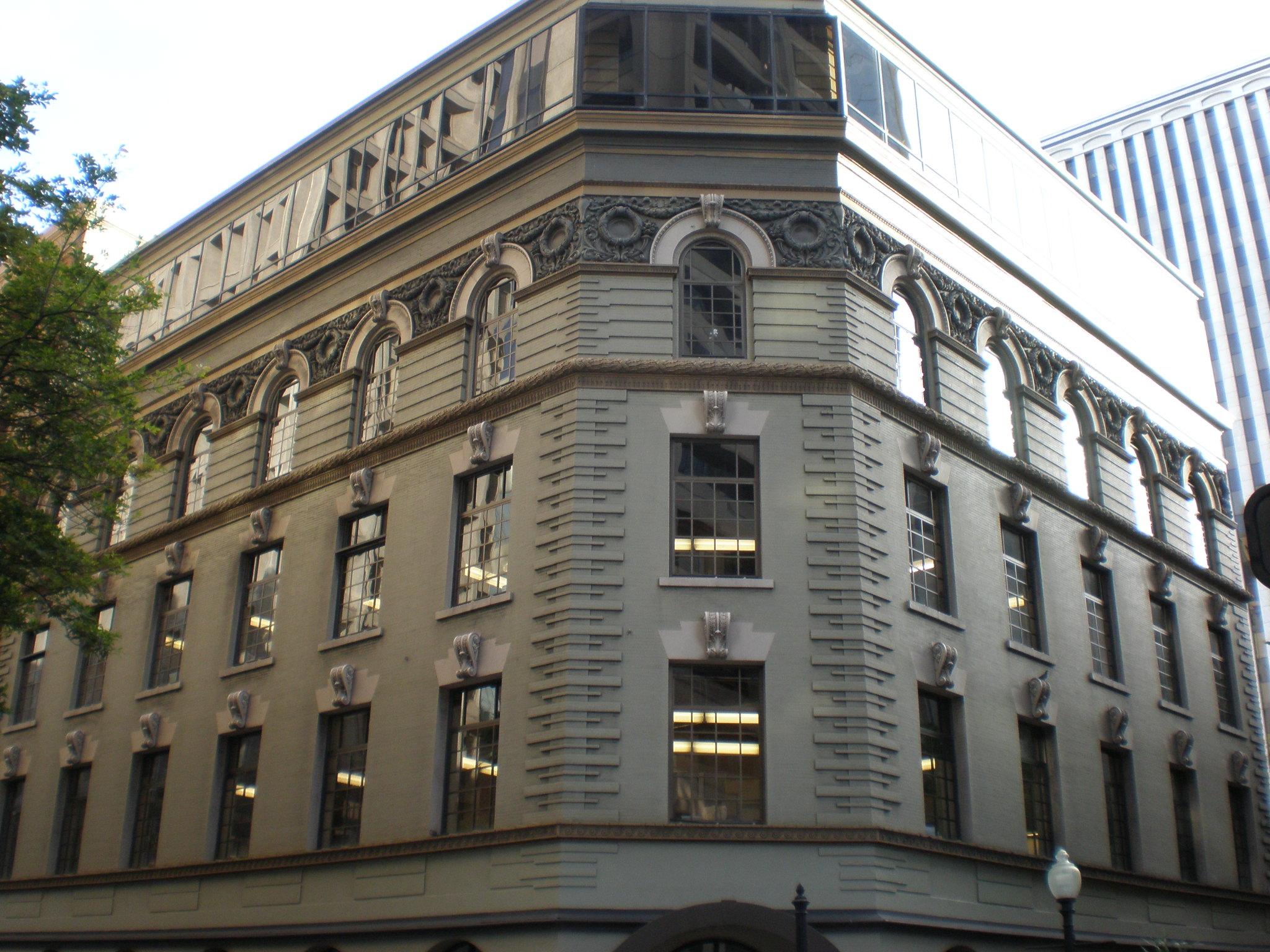
Judd Building, 1898

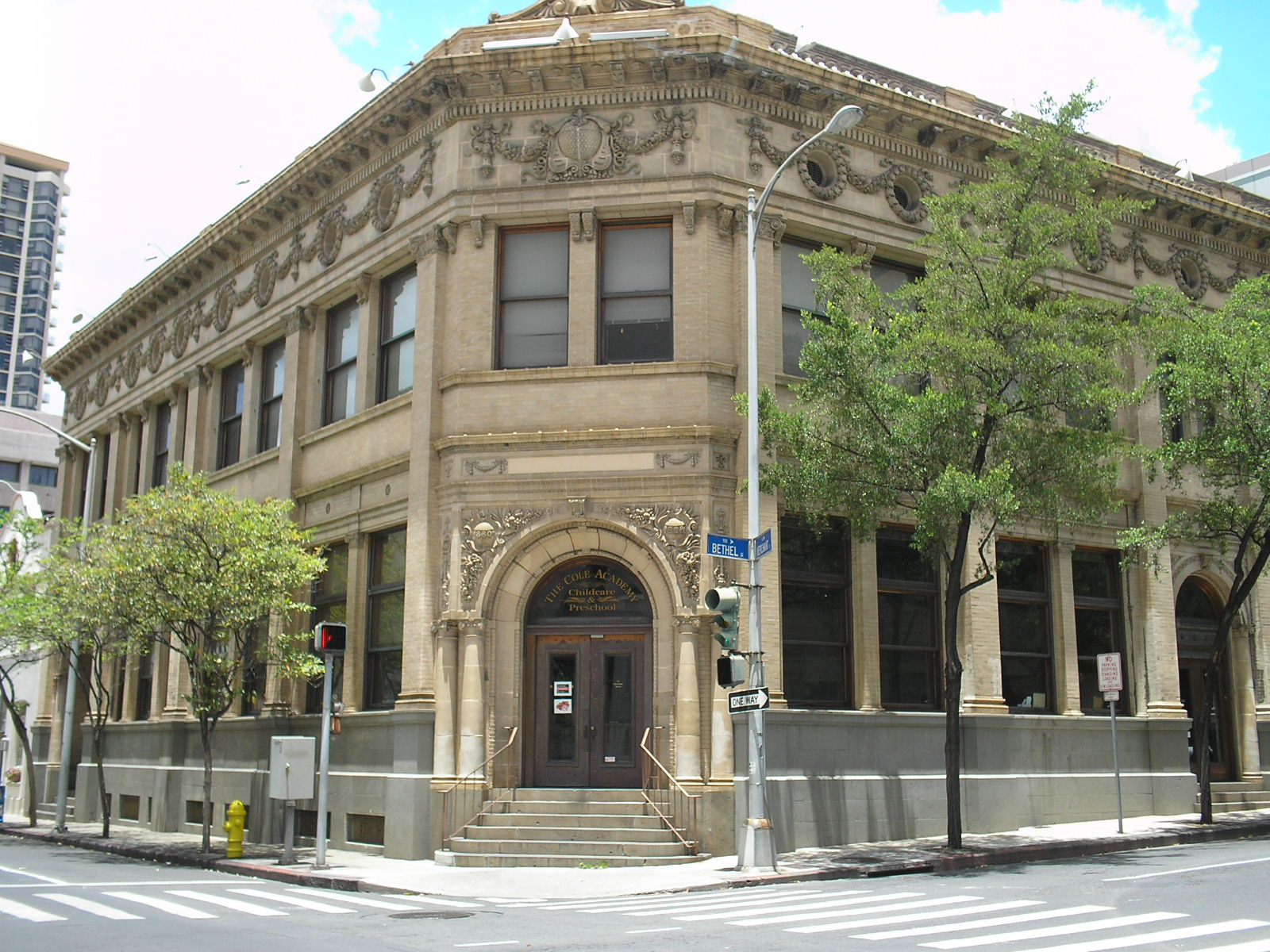
Yokohama Specie Bank Building, 1909

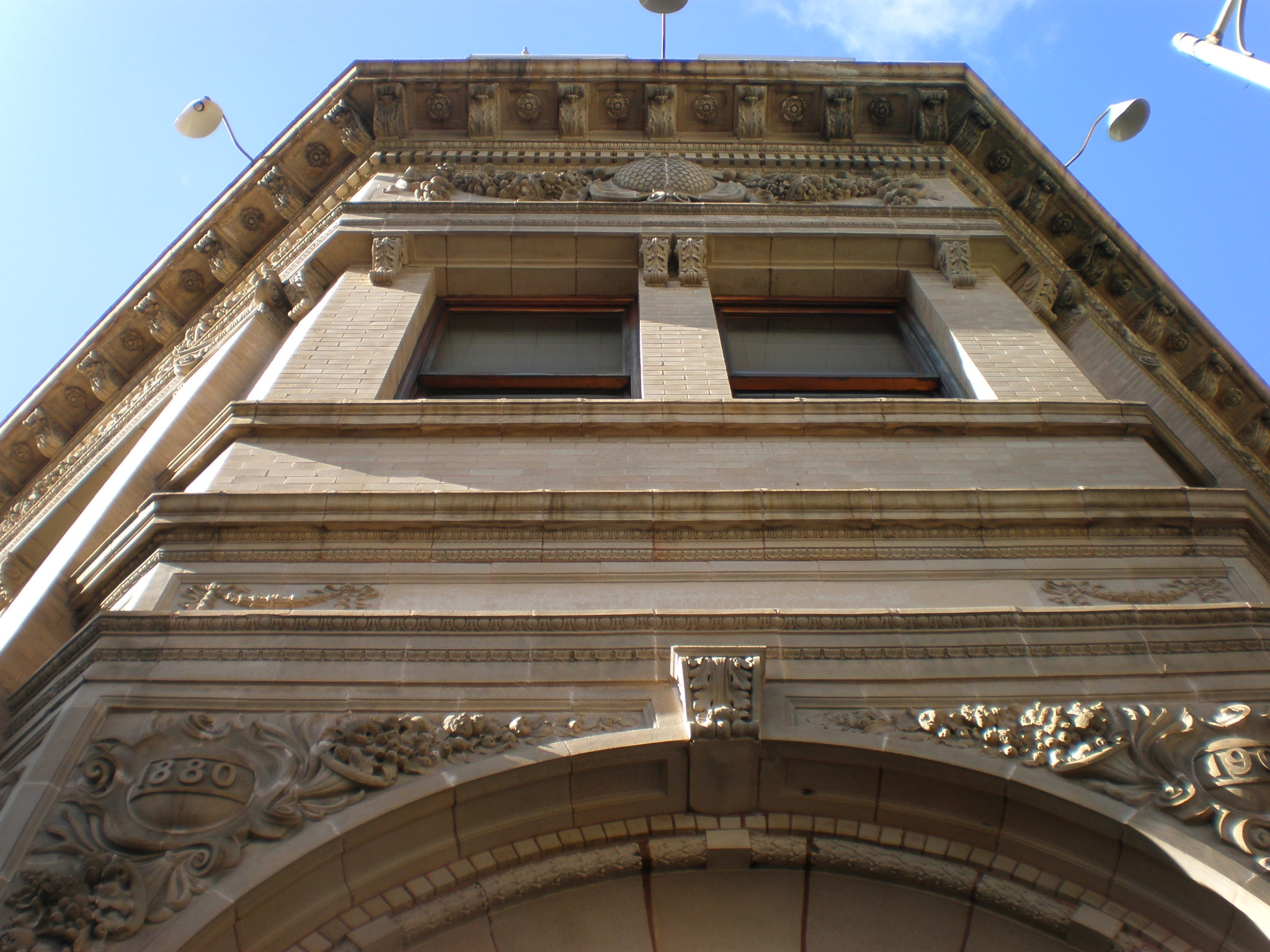
Facade above front entrance, Yokohama Specie Bank Building, 1909

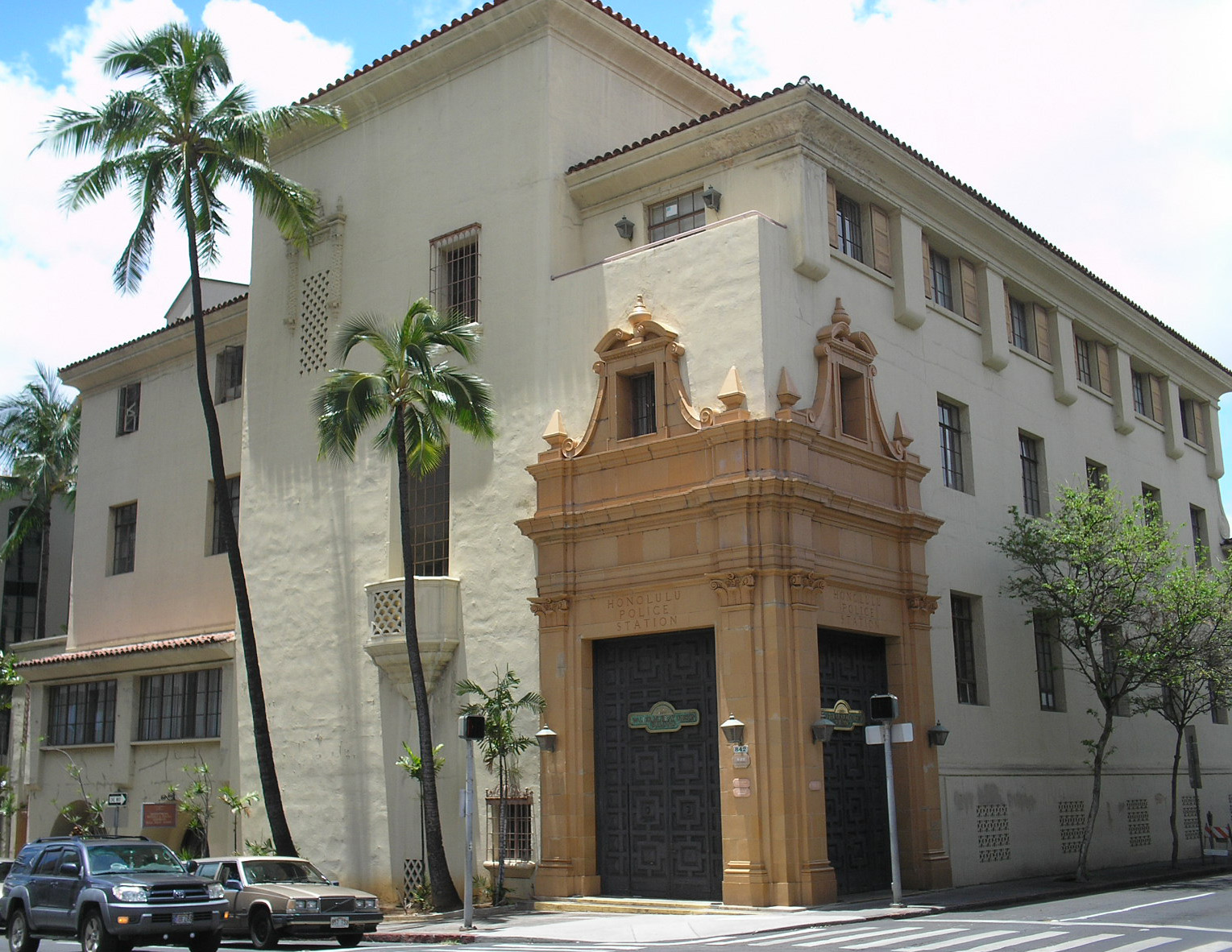
Old Police Station (front), 1931

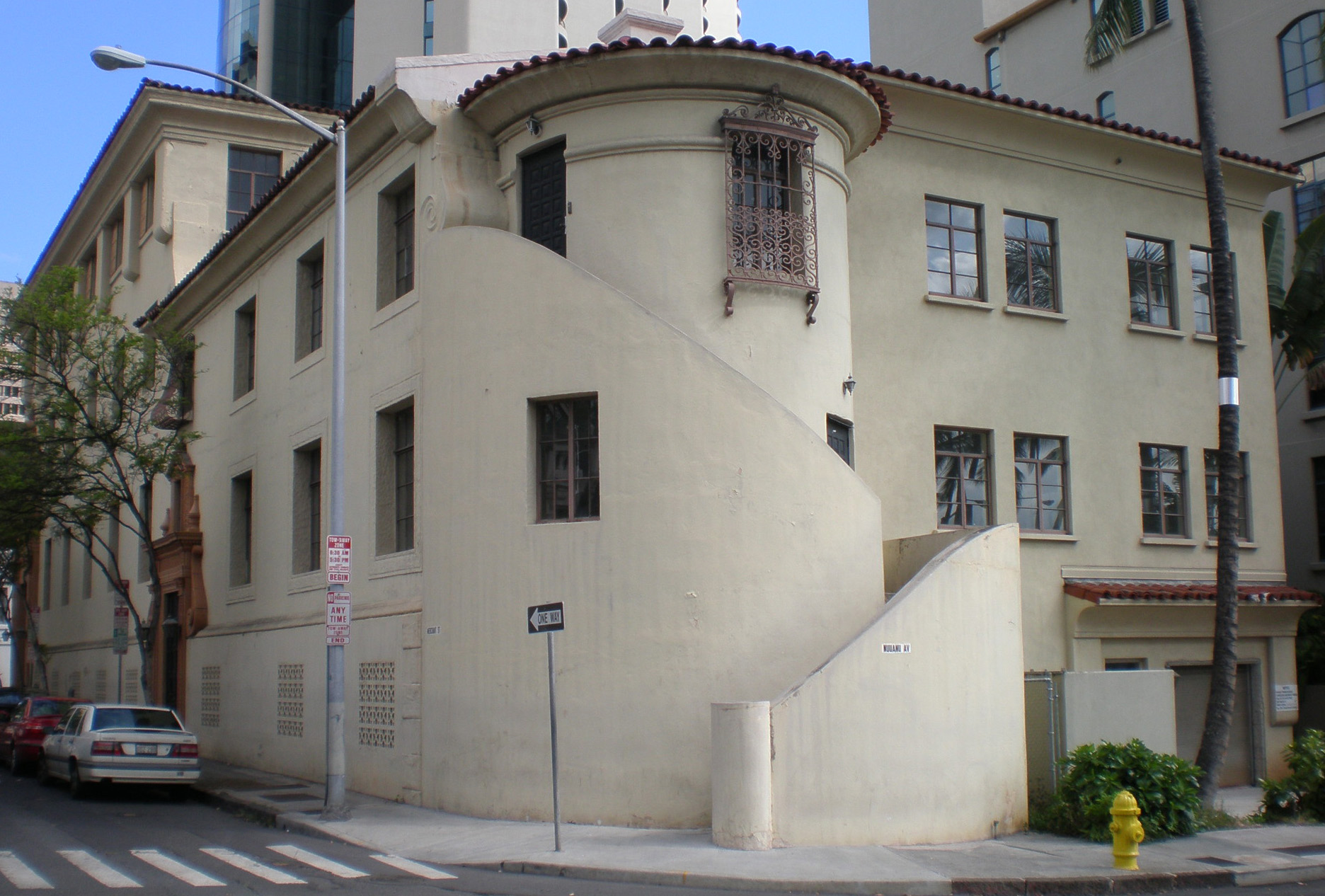
Old Police Station (rear), 1931
