= Clinton, Texas =

Clinton, Texas may refer to the following places in the U.S. state of Texas:

- Clinton, DeWitt County, Texas, a ghost town
- Clinton, Hunt County, Texas, an unincorporated community
- Clinton, Harris County, Texas, now annexed to Houston.
