= Clinton =

Clinton is an English toponymic surname, indicating one's ancestors came from English places called Glympton or Glinton. Clinton has also been used as a given name since the late 19th century.

Notable people with the name Clinton include:

== Family of Bill and Hillary Clinton ==
- Roger Clinton Sr. (1908–1967), step-father of Bill Clinton
- Virginia Clinton (1923–1994), mother of Bill Clinton
- Roger Clinton Jr. (born 1956), maternal half-brother of Bill Clinton
- Bill Clinton (born 1946), 42nd president of the United States from 1993 to 2001, and husband of Hillary Clinton
- Hillary Clinton (born 1947), née Rodham, 67th U.S. secretary of state from 2013 to 2017, U.S. senator from New York (2001 to 2013), 2016 Democratic presidential nominee, and wife of Bill Clinton
- Chelsea Clinton (born 1980), daughter of Bill and Hillary Clinton

== Family of George Clinton ==
- Charles Clinton (1690–1773), French and Indian War colonel, father of James and George Clinton
- James Clinton (1733–1812), American Revolutionary War general, father of DeWitt and brother of George Clinton
- George Clinton (vice president) (1739–1812), 4th vice president of the United States and 1st governor of New York
- DeWitt Clinton (1769–1828), 6th governor of New York and 47th mayor of New York City, son of James and nephew of George Clinton
- George Clinton Jr. (1771–1809), member of the U.S. House of Representatives from New York, son of George Clinton
- George W. Clinton (1807–1885), 12th mayor of Buffalo, New York, son of DeWitt Clinton

== Family of Sir Henry Clinton ==
- Admiral George Clinton (Royal Navy officer) (1686–1761), British naval officer and colonial governor
- General Henry Clinton (British Army officer, born 1730) (died 1795), British general during the American Revolutionary War
- General William Henry Clinton (1769–1846), British general during the Napoleonic Wars
- Lieutenant General Henry Clinton (British Army officer, born 1771) (died 1829), British general during the Napoleonic Wars

== Other notable people with the surname ==
- Bessie Clinton (fl. 16th century), née Bessie Blount, mistress of Henry VIII and wife of Edward Clinton, 1st Earl of Lincoln
- Catherine Clinton (born 1962), American history professor
- Clifford Clinton (1900–1969), American restaurateur
- David Clinton (born 1960), American Bicycle Motocross (BMX) racer
- Edward Clinton, 1st Earl of Lincoln (1512–1585), English admiral
- Franklin Clinton, Grand Theft Auto V character
- George Clinton (disambiguation), multiple people
- Gordon S. Clinton (1920–2011), 43rd mayor of Seattle
- Henry Clinton (disambiguation), multiple people
- Henry Fynes Clinton (1781–1852), British classical scholar and chronologist of the 19th century
- Jerry Clinton (1937–2003), American professor of Persian language and literature
- Joel Clinton (born 1981), Australian rugby league player
- John Clinton, 1st Baron Clinton (died 1315), English knight
- Joseph Clinton, American engineer
- Kate Clinton (born 1947), American comedian
- Larry Clinton (1909–1985), American trumpeter
- Lou Clinton (1937–1997), American baseball player
- Mark Clinton (1915–2001), Irish politician
- Mary Clinton (born 1960), New Zealand field hockey
- Richard Clinton (cricketer) (born 1981), English cricketer
- Richard Clinton (politician) (1741–1795), American military officer and politician
- Sam Houston Clinton (1923–2004), American judge

== See also ==
- Baron Clinton, a title in the peerage of England
- McClinton (disambiguation)
