= Henry Pelham-Clinton =

Henry Pelham-Clinton may refer to:

- Henry Pelham-Clinton, 2nd Duke of Newcastle (1720–1794)
- Henry Pelham-Clinton, Earl of Lincoln (1750–1778), his son, British politician
- Henry Pelham-Clinton, 4th Duke of Newcastle (1785–1851)
- Henry Pelham-Clinton, 5th Duke of Newcastle (1811–1864)
- Henry Pelham-Clinton, 6th Duke of Newcastle (1834–1879)
- Henry Pelham-Clinton, 7th Duke of Newcastle (1864–1928)

== See also ==
- Henry Pelham (disambiguation)
- Henry Clinton (disambiguation)
