= Clinton, South Australia (disambiguation) =

Clinton, South Australia is a town and a locality in South Australia.

Clinton, South Australia may also refer:

- Clinton Conservation Park, a protected area
- Clinton National Park, the former name of the Clinton Conservation Park
- District Council of Clinton, a former local government area which was merged with others to create the District Council of Central Yorke Peninsula
- Hundred of Clinton, a cadastral unit

== See also ==
- Clinton (disambiguation)
- Clinton Centre, South Australia
