= George Clinton =

George Clinton may refer to:

== Music ==
- George Clinton (clarinettist) (1850–1913), British clarinettist
- George Clinton (funk musician) (born 1941), American funk musician
- George S. Clinton (born 1947), American composer, songwriter and arranger

== Politics ==
- George Clinton (vice president) (1739–1812), 4th Vice President of the United States and 1st Governor of New York
- George Clinton Jr. (1771–1809), U.S. Representative from New York, nephew of the above
- George W. Clinton (1807–1885), mayor of Buffalo, New York
- George De Witt Clinton, member of the 77th (1854) and 80th New York State Legislatures (1857)
- George Clinton (politician, born 1846), member of the 107th New York State Legislature (1884), son of George W. Clinton
- George Henry Clinton (fl. 1908–1924), Louisiana politician

== Other people ==
- George Clinton (Royal Navy officer) (1686–1761), British admiral of the fleet and colonial governor of Newfoundland and of New York
- George Perkins Clinton (1867–1937), American botanist and mycologist
- George Clinton (rugby league) (1924–2010), English rugby league player and coach

== See also ==
- Clinton (surname)
- George Clinton Sweeney (1895–1966), United States federal judge
