= Collymore =

Collymore is a surname. Notable people with the surname include:

- Brandon Collymore, American professional wrestler
- Clinton Collymore, Guyanese politician
- Corey Collymore (born 1977), Barbadian cricketer
- Frank Collymore (1893–1980), Barbadian author and poet
- Robert Collymore (1958–2019) Guyanese-born British businessman
- Stan Collymore (born 1971), English footballer and football pundit
