= Clinton College =

Clinton College may refer to

- Clinton College (Kentucky), a defunct college in Clinton, Kentucky
- Clinton College (South Carolina), Rock Hill, South Carolina
- Clinton College (Tennessee), a defunct college in New Middleton, Tennessee

== See also ==
- Clinton Community College (disambiguation)
