= Henry Pelham (disambiguation) =

Henry Pelham (1694–1754) was prime minister of Great Britain.

Henry Pelham may also refer to:

- Henry Pelham (speaker) (fl. 1640s), English speaker of the House of Commons
- Henry Pelham (Clerk of the Pells) (1661–1721), member of parliament for Seaford and Lewes
- Henry Pelham (of Stanmer) (c. 1694–1725), member of parliament for Hastings and Lewes
- Henry Pelham (engraver) (1748/9–1806), American Loyalist and artist
- Henry Pelham (British Army officer) (1759–1797), 3rd Foot Guards officer and member of parliament for Lewes
- Henry Pelham, 3rd Earl of Chichester (1804–1886), English nobleman
- Henry Pelham (rower) (1908–1978), Canadian rower
- Henry Cressett Pelham (c. 1729–1803), member of parliament for Bramber and Tiverton
- Henry Francis Pelham (1846–1907), English scholar and historian
- Henry Pelham (civil servant) (1876–1949), British civil servant

== See also ==
- Henry Pelham-Clinton (disambiguation)
