= Clinton Community College =

Clinton Community College may refer to two institutions in the United States:

- Clinton Community College (Iowa)
- Clinton Community College (New York)
