= Henry Clinton =

Henry Clinton may refer to:

- Henry Clinton, 2nd Earl of Lincoln (1539–1616), English peer, styled Lord Clinton from 1572 to 1585
- Henry Clinton, 7th Earl of Lincoln (1684–1728), uncle of Sir Henry Clinton (1730–1795)
- Sir Henry Clinton (British Army officer, born 1730) (General, 1730–1795), general during the American War of Independence; British Commander-in-Chief in North America
- Sir Henry Clinton (British Army officer, born 1771) (Lieutenant General, 1771–1829), son of Sir Henry Clinton (1730–1795), British Army officer; general officer during Napoleonic Wars
- Henry Fynes Clinton (1781–1852), English classical scholar and chronologist

== See also ==
- Henry Pelham-Clinton (disambiguation)
