= Clinton, Wisconsin =

Clinton is the name of several places in the U.S. state of Wisconsin:

- Clinton, Barron County, Wisconsin, a town
- Clinton (town), Rock County, Wisconsin, a town
- Clinton (village), Rock County, Wisconsin, a village
- Clinton, Vernon County, Wisconsin, a town
