= Jerry Clinton =

Professor of Persian 1937–2003

Jerome (Jerry) Wright Clinton (1937 – 7 November 2003) was a Ferdowsi scholar and professor of Persian language and literature at Princeton University. Clinton was born in San Jose, California.

A graduate of Stanford University, Jerry received his MA in English and American literature at the University of Pennsylvania, spent two years in the Peace Corps in Iran, and received his Ph.D. at the University of Michigan in Persian and Arabic literature. He returned to Iran in 1970, where he did his dissertation research, completing his degree in 1972.

After teaching at the University of Minnesota and directing the Tehran Center of the American Institute of Iranian Studies, he was appointed professor of Persian at Princeton University in 1974. He taught there for twenty-eight years in the Department of Near Eastern Studies until his retirement in 2002.

His many articles on classical Persian literature remain landmark studies of individual works or generic characteristics. Chief among these are two essays on the Mada'en Qasida of Khaqani, "Xaqani's Mada'en Qaside (I)", (1976), and "Xaqani's Mada'en Qaside (II)", (1977). Also notable are his "Esthetics by Implication: What Metaphors of Craft Tell us About the Unity of the Persian Qasida", (1979), and "Madness and Cure in the 1001 Nights: the Tale of Shahriyar and Shahrizad", (1985).

Clinton was a scholar and translator of the Persian epic, the Shahnameh (Book of Kings). His work on various aspects of that work have helped define the field of Shahnama studies for over two decades and his translations of episodes from it have been a staple of university classrooms. Most notably, his 1986 "Tragedy of Sohrab and Rostam" was later published in The Norton Anthology of World Masterpieces.

In 2002, his rendition of the episode of Esfandiyar, published under the title of "In the Dragon's Claws", won the Lois Roth Persian Translation Prize. In recent years, Jerry's research was focused on the relation between text and illustration in illustrated manuscripts of The Book of Kings. Many of us may still remember his perceptive presentation in the Third Biennial Conference on Iranian Studies, provocatively titled, "What Color Is the White Div?"

Clinton died on Friday 7 November 2003, of biliary cancera, at the age of 66. In an obituary for Clinton, his colleague and close friend, Ahmad Karimi-Hakkak, writes:

Jerry, a man of impeccable integrity and great decency, was a meticulous and impressively forward-looking scholar of Persian literature whose professional interests spanned literary theory and criticism, translation and translation theory, and in recent years, the esthetics of word-image relations. As early as 1969, decades before the idea of computer-generated reference lists would gain currency, he wrote an article in The Journal of Iranian Studies titled "On the Feasibility of an Automated Bibliography of Iranian Studies."

Impressive as Jerry's scholarship was, it tends to pale before his vast humanity, his profound loyalty to his friends, and his ever-present habit of 'shekasteh nafsi' (the breaking of the self), which he had so well combined with American self-effacement. Even in the throes of the illness that eventually took him, he was a tremendous help to my family and me as we struggled to come to terms with my son's illness.

== See also ==
- Persian literature
- Ferdowsi
- Iranian Studies
