= Clinton Kelly =

Clinton Kelly may refer to:

- Clinton Kelly (minister) (1808–1875), pioneer Methodist minister and early settler of Oregon City, Oregon
- Clinton Kelly (TV personality) (born 1969), co-host of the U.S. version of What Not to Wear
