= Clinton, West Virginia =

Clinton, West Virginia may refer to:

- Clinton, Boone County, West Virginia, an unincorporated community in Boone County
- Clinton, Ohio County, West Virginia, an unincorporated community in Ohio County
