= Louis Davis (architect) =

American architect

Louis E. Davis
- Born: 1884
- Died: 1963 (aged 78–79)
- Occupation: Architect
- Buildings: President William McKinley High School (1920s), Agriculture Building (1930), Honolulu Police Station (1931)

Louis E. Davis (1884–1963) was an American architect who designed homes and public buildings in Honolulu, Hawaii. During the 1920s, he was involved in laying out the new King Street campus of President William McKinley High School and designing its buildings in a Spanish Colonial Revival style. He employed a similar style (Mission Revival) in designing the 1931 Honolulu Police Station on Merchant Street, which harmonized well with that of the new city hall, Honolulu Hale. Both the old McKinley campus quadrangle and the Merchant Street Historic District are on the National Register of Historic Places.

== Architectural styles ==
Davis was well known for his work in the Spanish Colonial/Mission Revival style, but he also designed a very significant building that is one of the few enduring examples of rustic Mediterranean Revival architecture in the state: the Territorial Board of Agriculture and Forestry Building (1930) at the corner of Keeaumoku and King Streets in Honolulu. For this building, he employed locally quarried sandstone with distinctive green mortar, along with concrete masonry and finer sandstone for such detailing as window sills, lintels, colonnades and casements, topped by a tiled, low-pitched hip roof without eaves.

During the early 1930s, land developer Theo H. Davies & Co. hired Davis to design new homes in a "Monterey" (or Spanish eclectic) style to be built on lots being developed in the new subdivision of Kāhala. Note: This is partially correct. "The first group of Davie's houses had been designed by the Honolulu architect Louis Davis, in early 1932. But near the end of the year the second group was placed in the hands of the firm's in-house architectural staff (Vladimir Ossipoff was the head of the staff beginning in April 1932). Ossipoff did not disappoint." He referred to this style as "Modified Monterey" using Hawaiian influences.

Davis is also credited as the architect of several of Hawaiʻi's classic movie theatres. The Princess Theatre opened in 1922 at 1236 Fort Street. It was remodeled in 1939, renovated in 1958 for Cinerama, closed in 1969, then demolished. The New Pawaa Theatre opened in 1929 at 1550 South King Street. Its exterior and distinctive Spanish-style interior was renovated in 1962, when it was renamed the Cinerama, then closed in 1999 to become an auto-parts store. The New Palama Theatre opened in 1930 at 701 North King Street with 1,100 seats. This ornate Chinese-style building was leased and renamed the Zamboanga Theatre in 1970, but became retail space and is now a church. The rural Waipahu Theatre, with its graceful sloping tile roof, opened in late 1930 on Depot Road, across from the Waipahu Sugar Mill. Sold in 1970, it is now a church. In 1931, Davis designed the Lihue Theatre on the Island of Kauaʻi. It was damaged in two hurricanes in 1982 and 1992 and its auditorium was demolished for senior citizen housing but the facade and lobby were retained and restored.

== Selected works ==
- Princess Theatre (November 8, 1922), Honolulu, Hawaii, with C.B. Ripley and Ralph Fishbourne; demolished around 1968
- McKinley High School (1924), Honolulu, Hawaii
- New Pawaa Theatre (January 3, 1929), Honolulu, Hawaii; later known as Hawaii Cinerama, closed in 1999
- New Palama Theatre (April 19, 1930), Honolulu, Hawaii; later known as Zamboanga Theatre
- Waipahu Theatre (December 21, 1930), Honolulu, Hawaii
- Lipolani house (1930), Honolulu, Hawaii
- Agriculture and Forestry Building (1930), Honolulu, Hawaii
- Honolulu Police Station (1931), Honolulu, Hawaii
- Lihue Theatre (October 4, 1931), Kaua'i
- Pahonu (1933), private residence in Waimānalo, Hawaii, made famous as Robin's Nest (21.324917°N 157.679526°W) in the original 1980s television series Magnum, P.I.; April 2018 razed

== Gallery ==
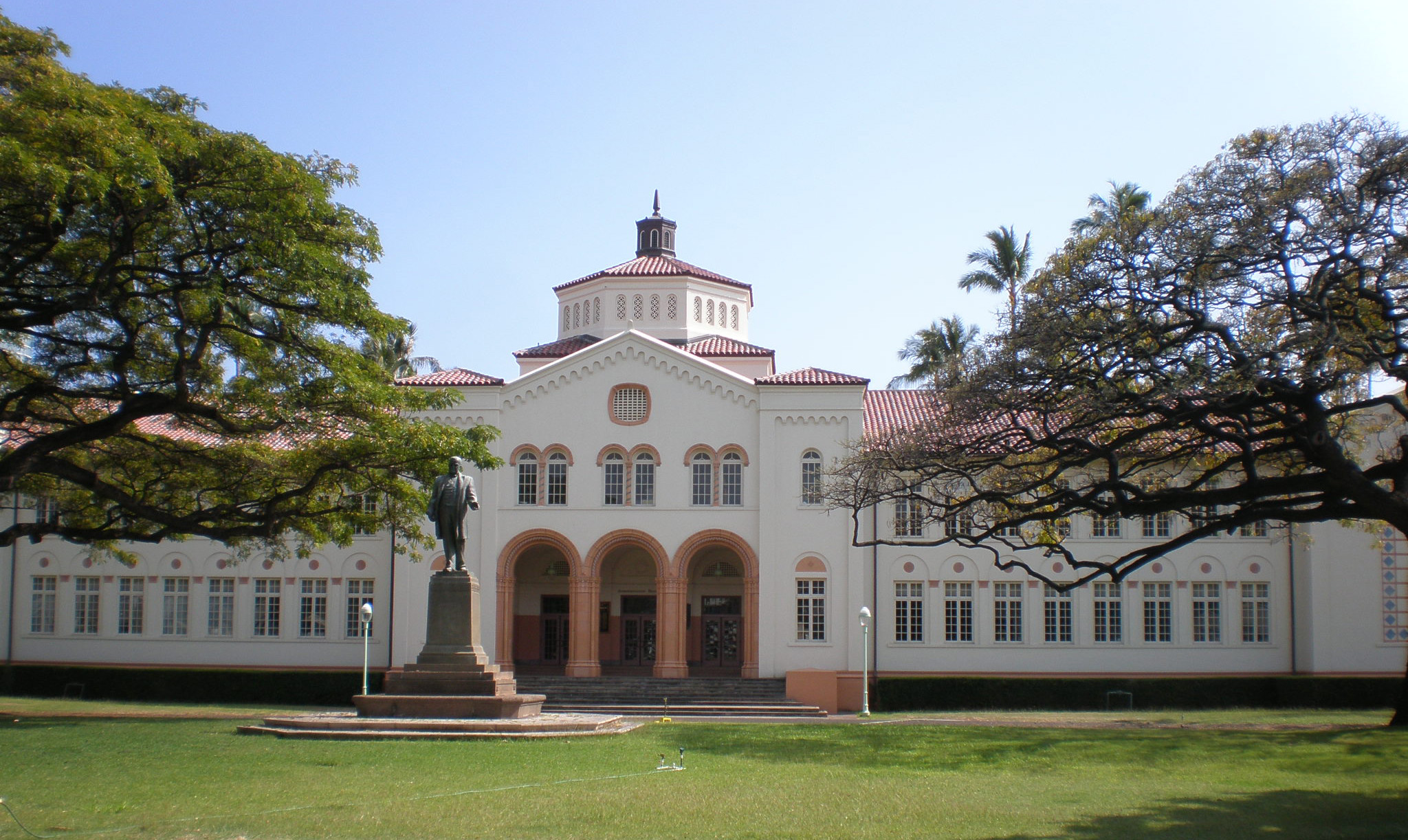
Statue and main administration building, 1920s

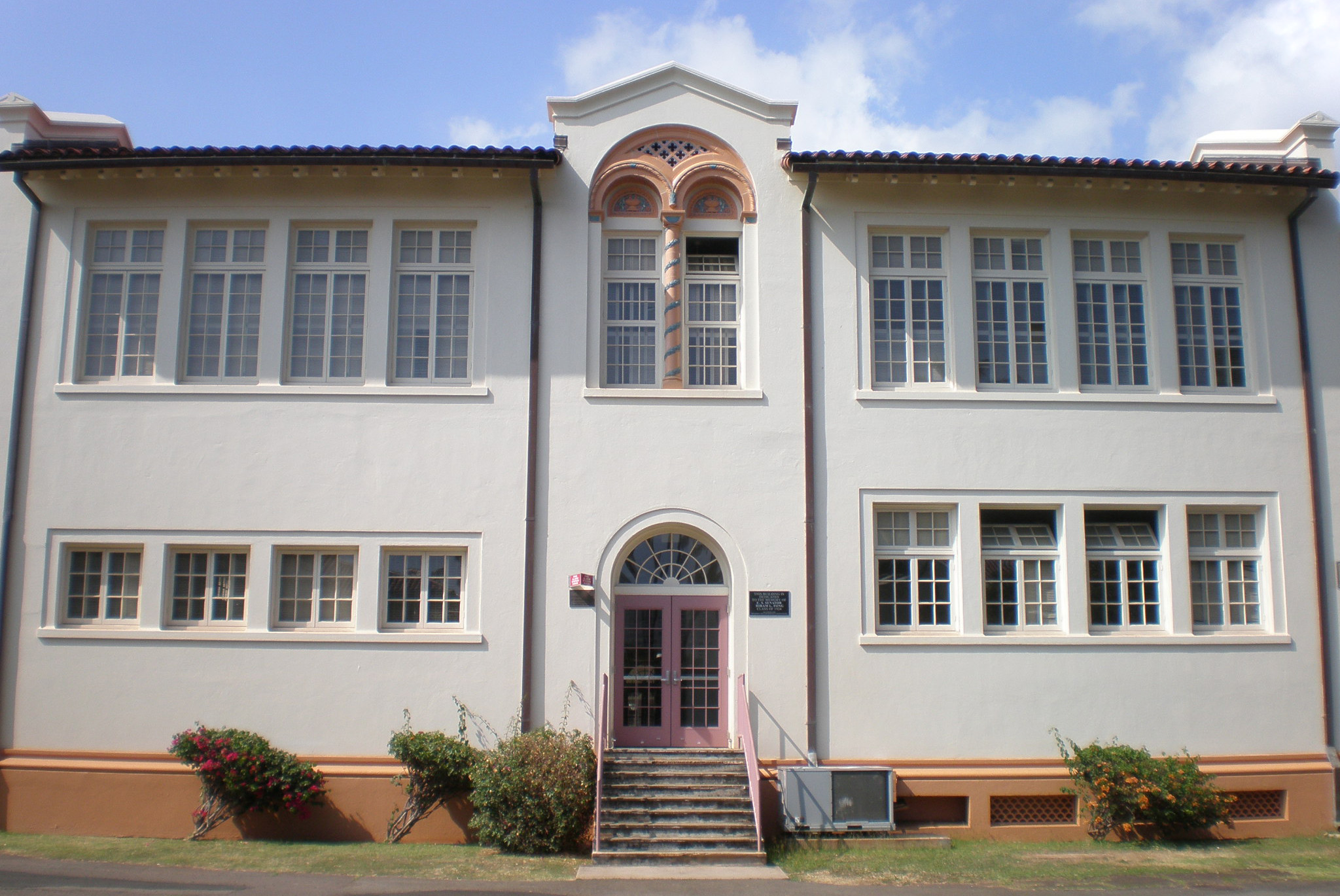
Commercial building, with NRHP plaque, 1920s

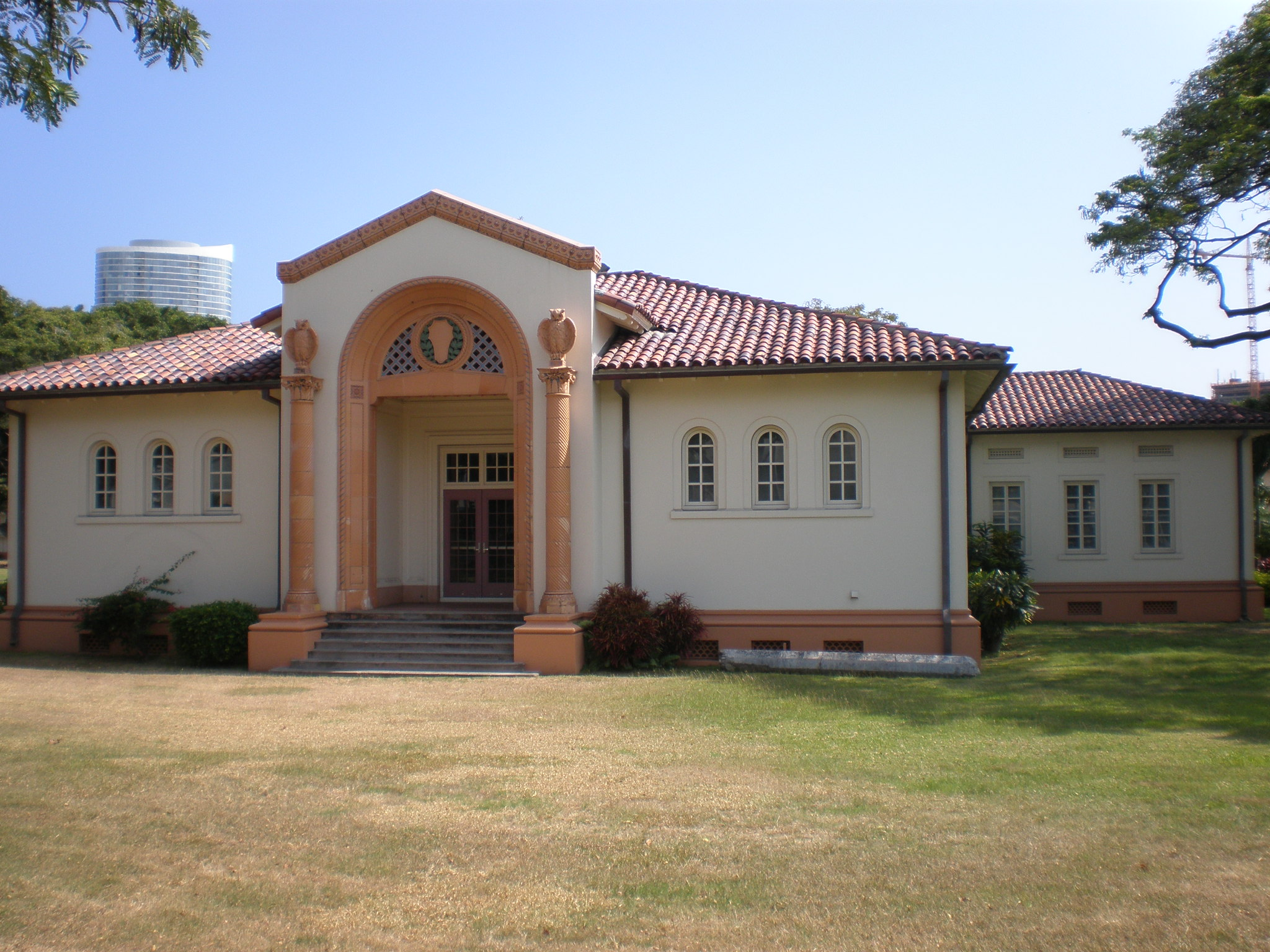
Art building, with owl columns, 1920s

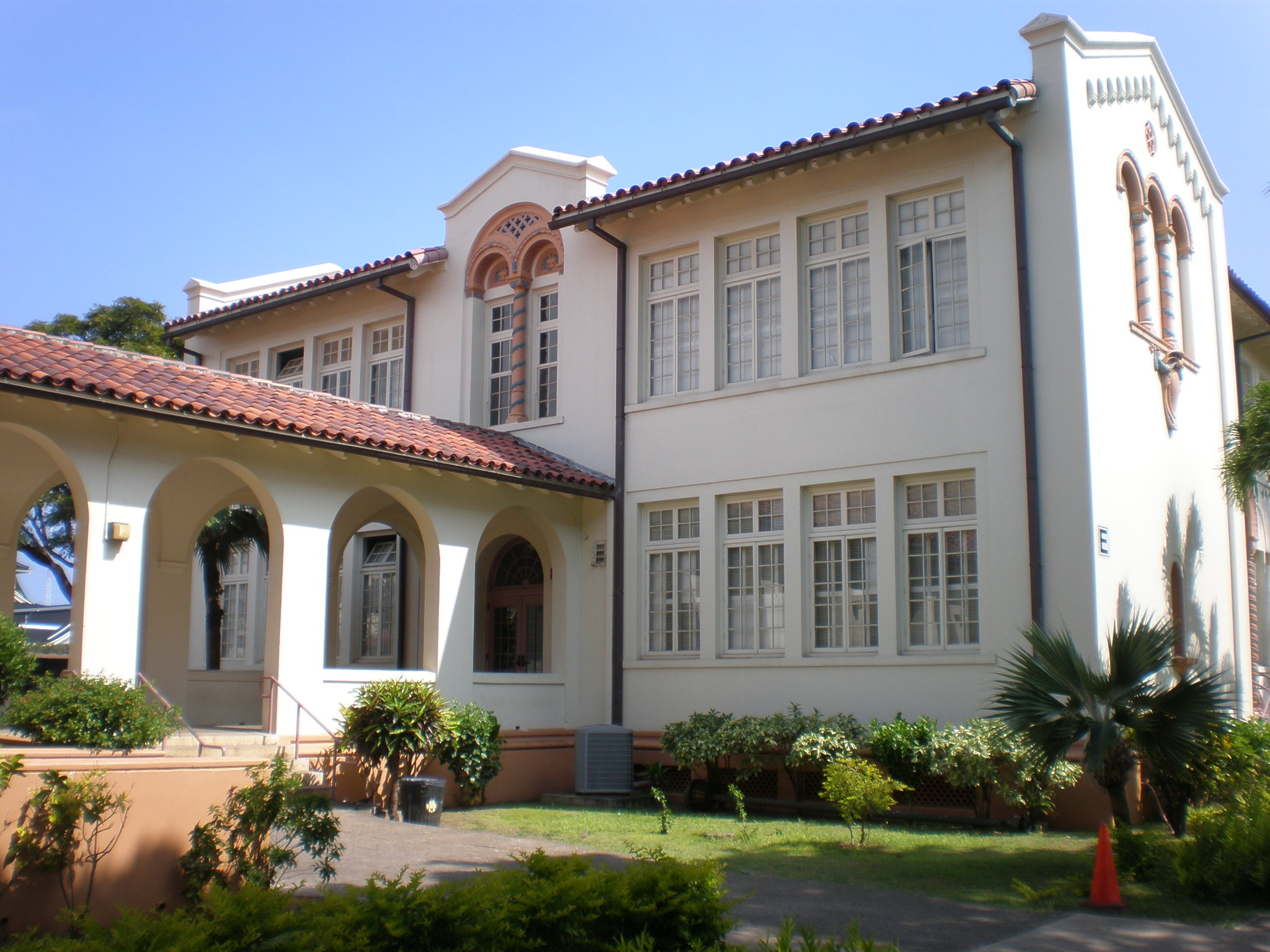
Walkway to Beckwith Hall, 1920s

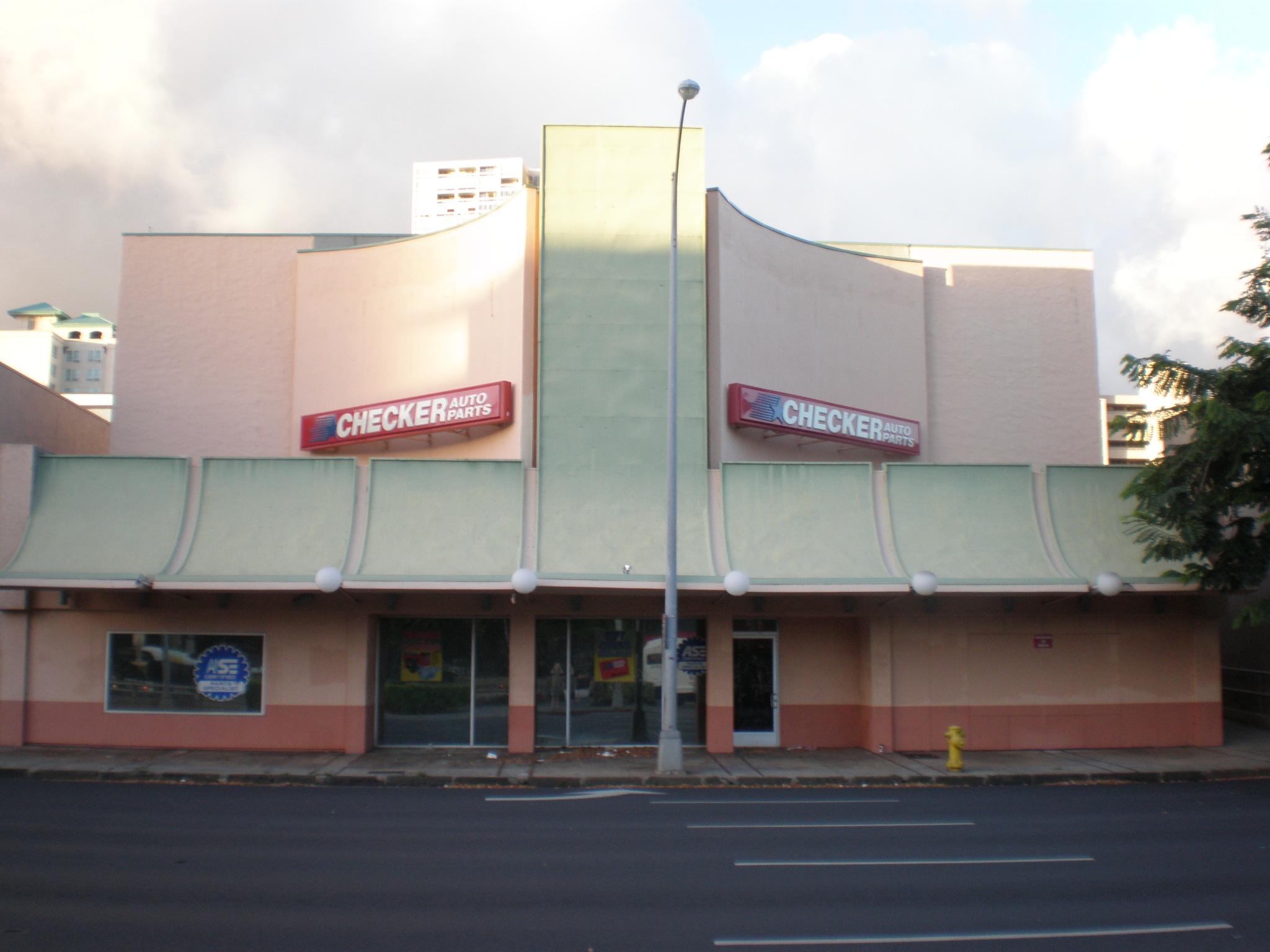
New Pawaa (later Cinerama) Theatre, 1929

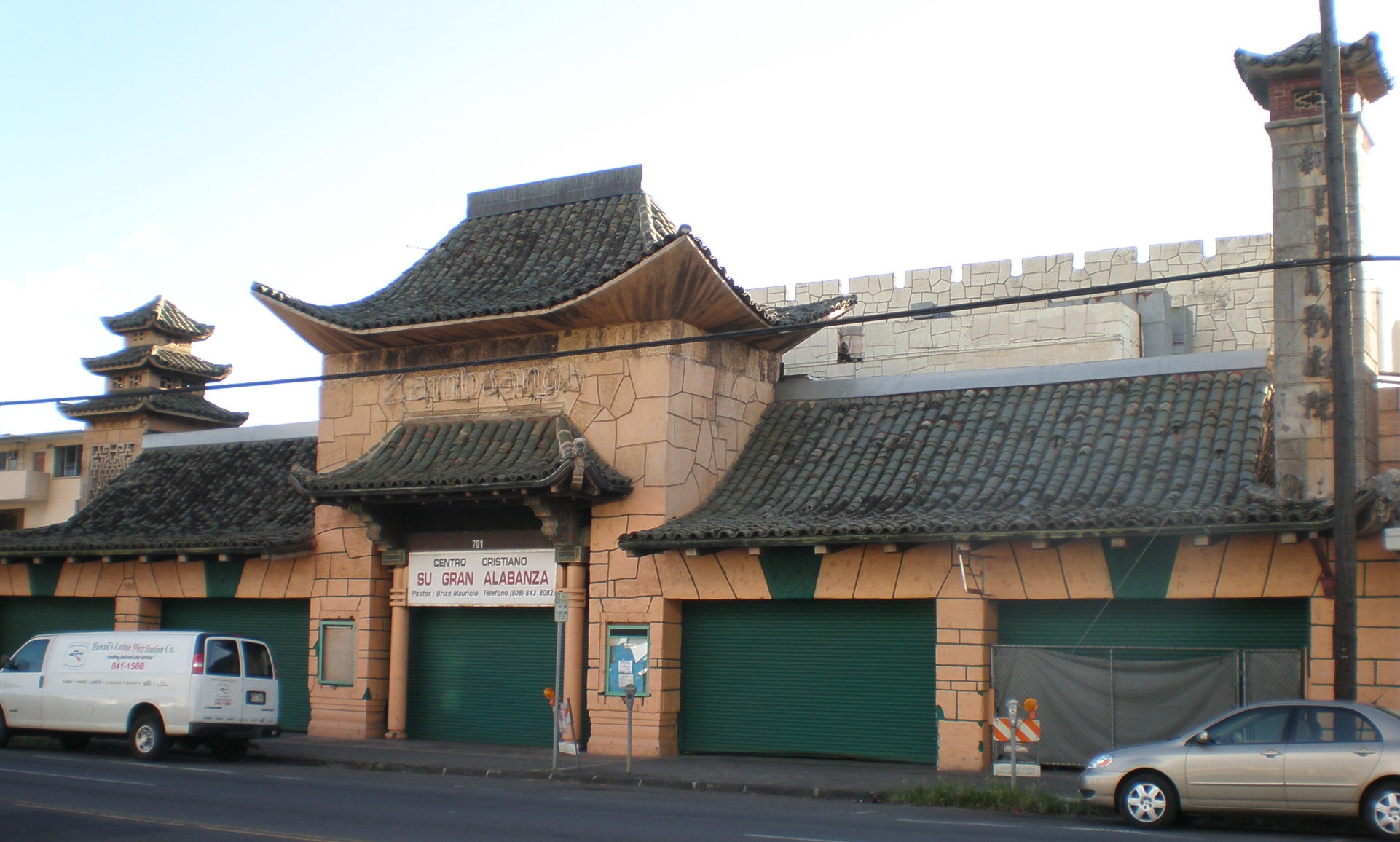
New Palama (later Zamboanga) Theatre, 1930

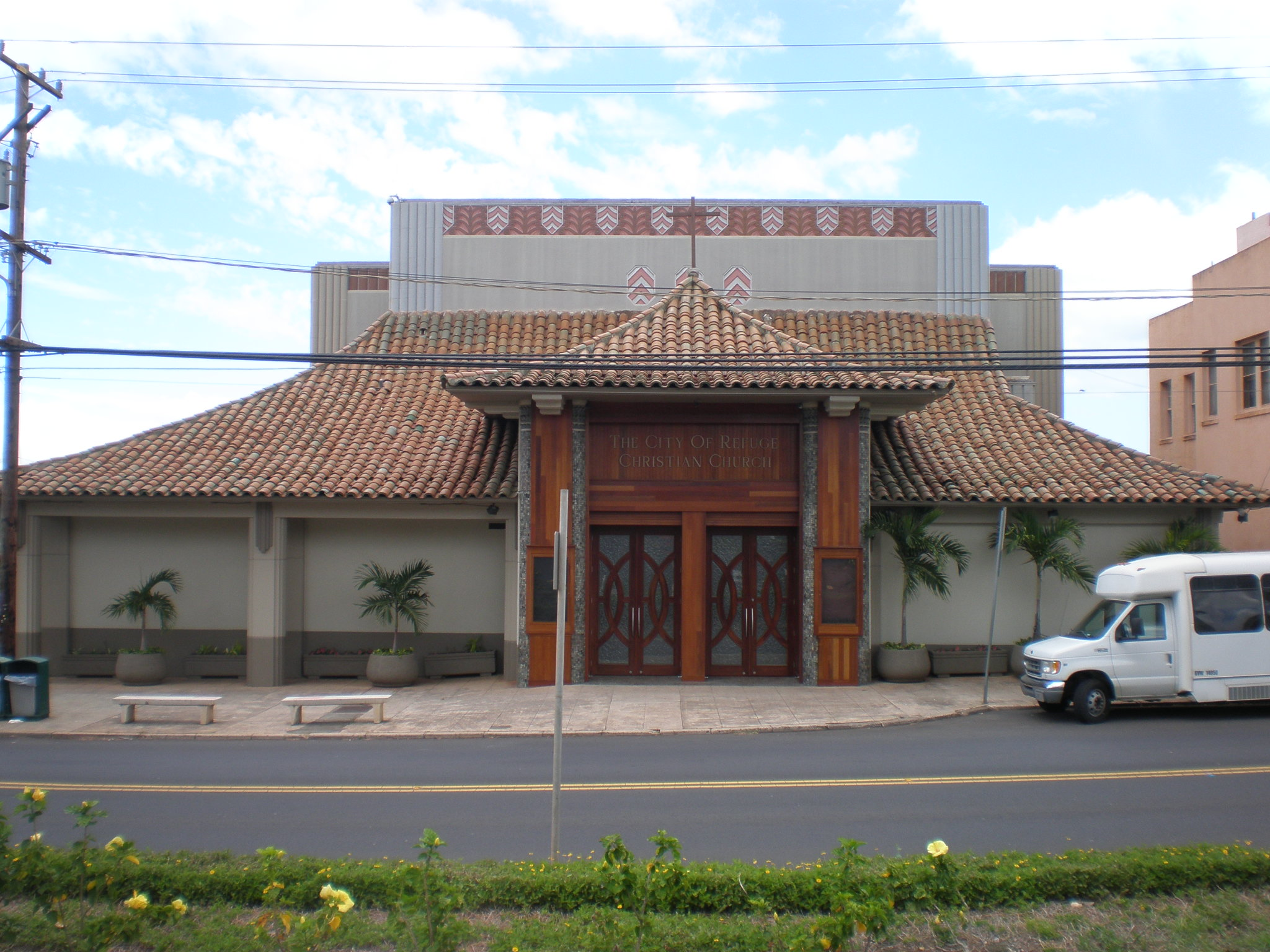
Waipahu Theatre, 1930 (now City of Refuge Church)

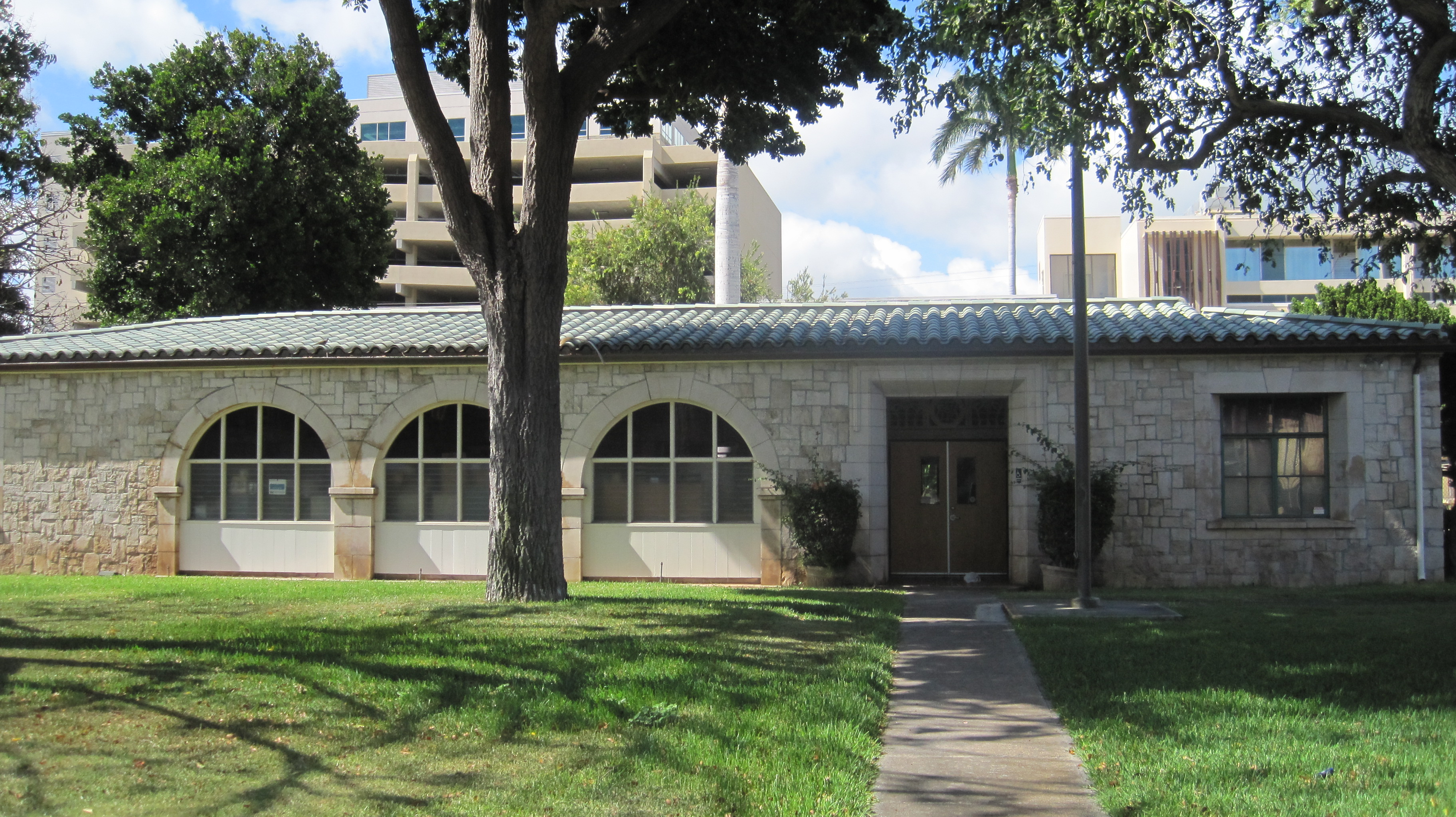
Agriculture & Forestry building, 1930

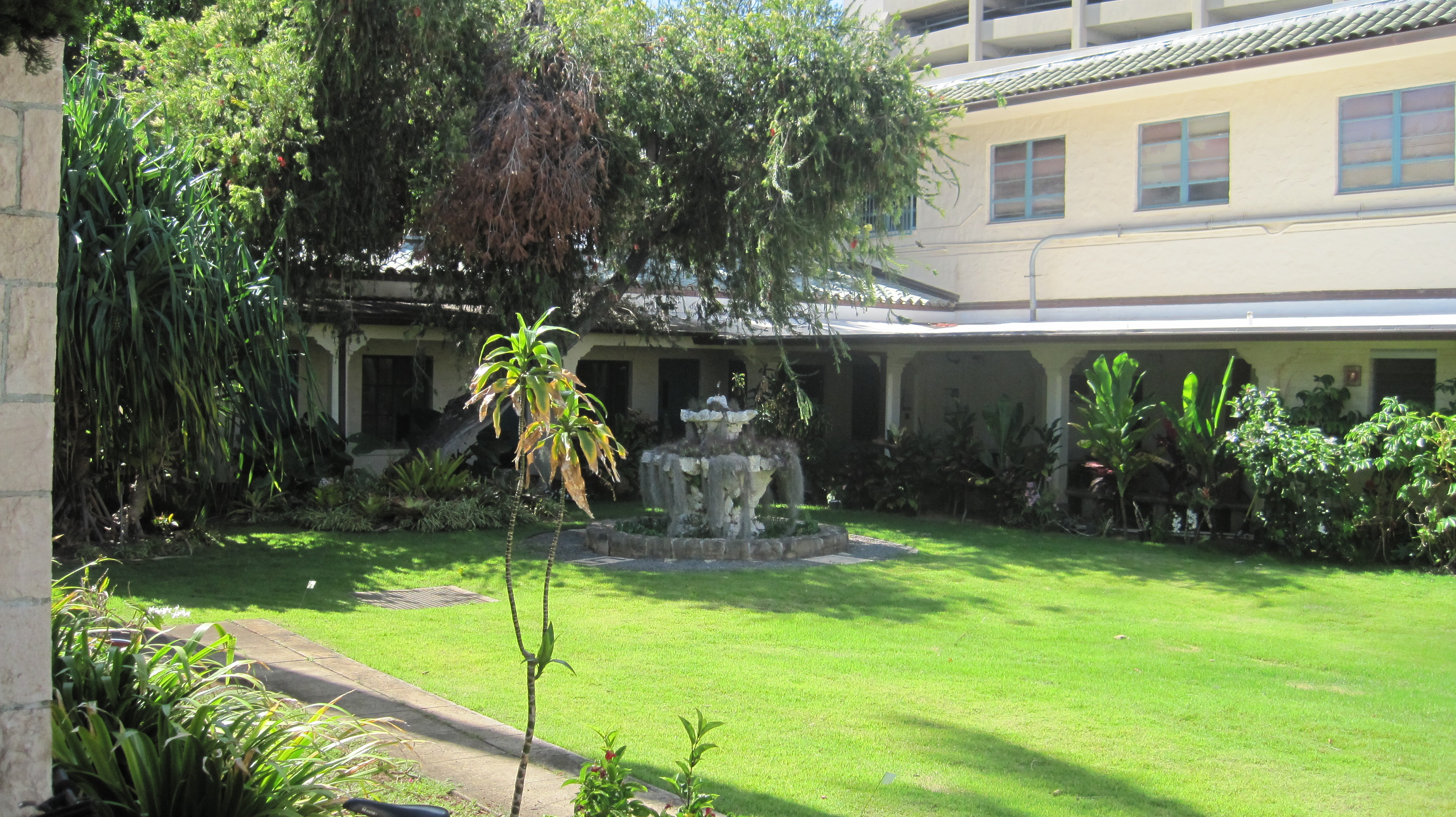
Agriculture & Forestry building courtyard, 1930

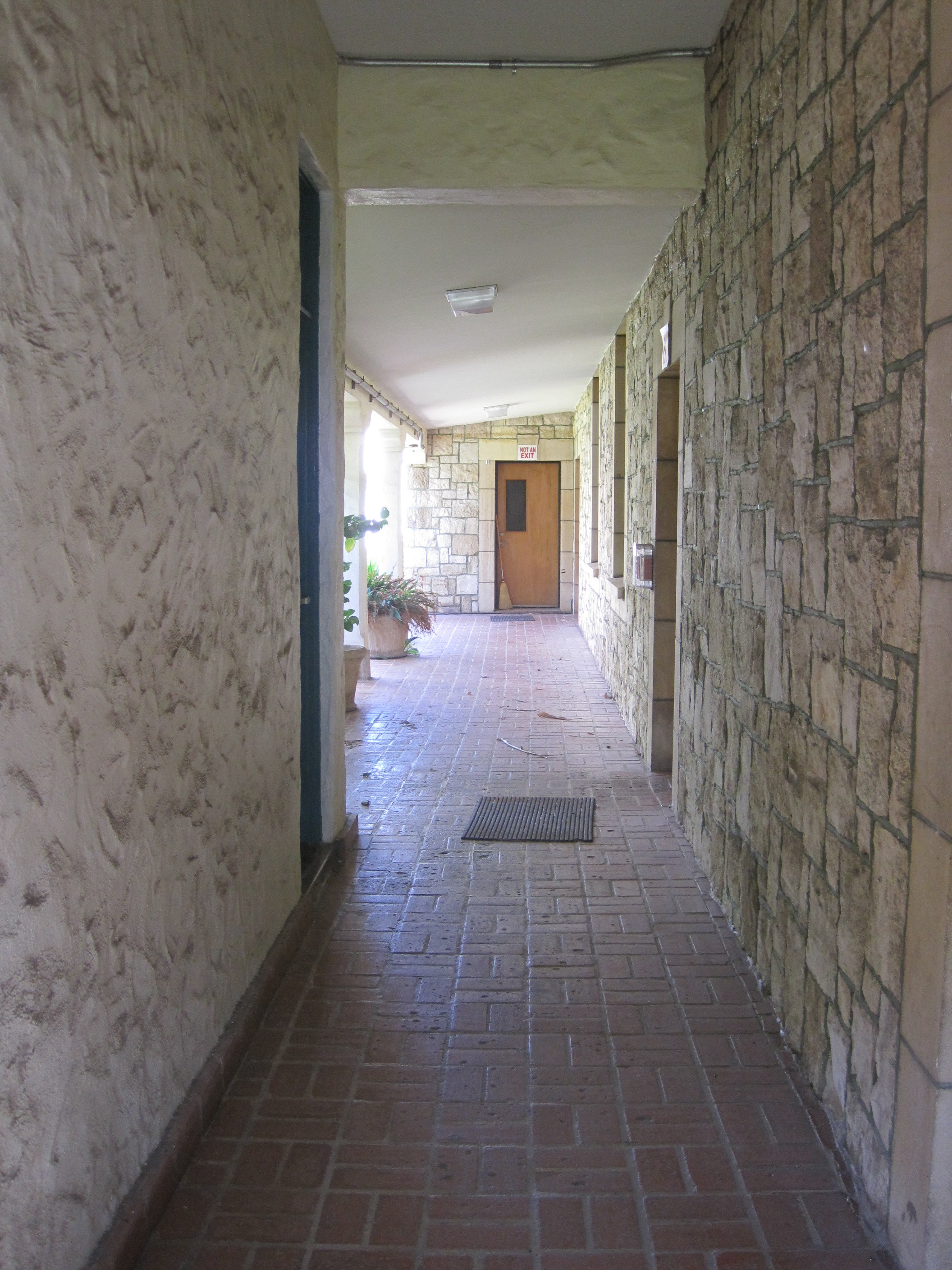
Agriculture & Forestry building hallway to courtyard, 1930

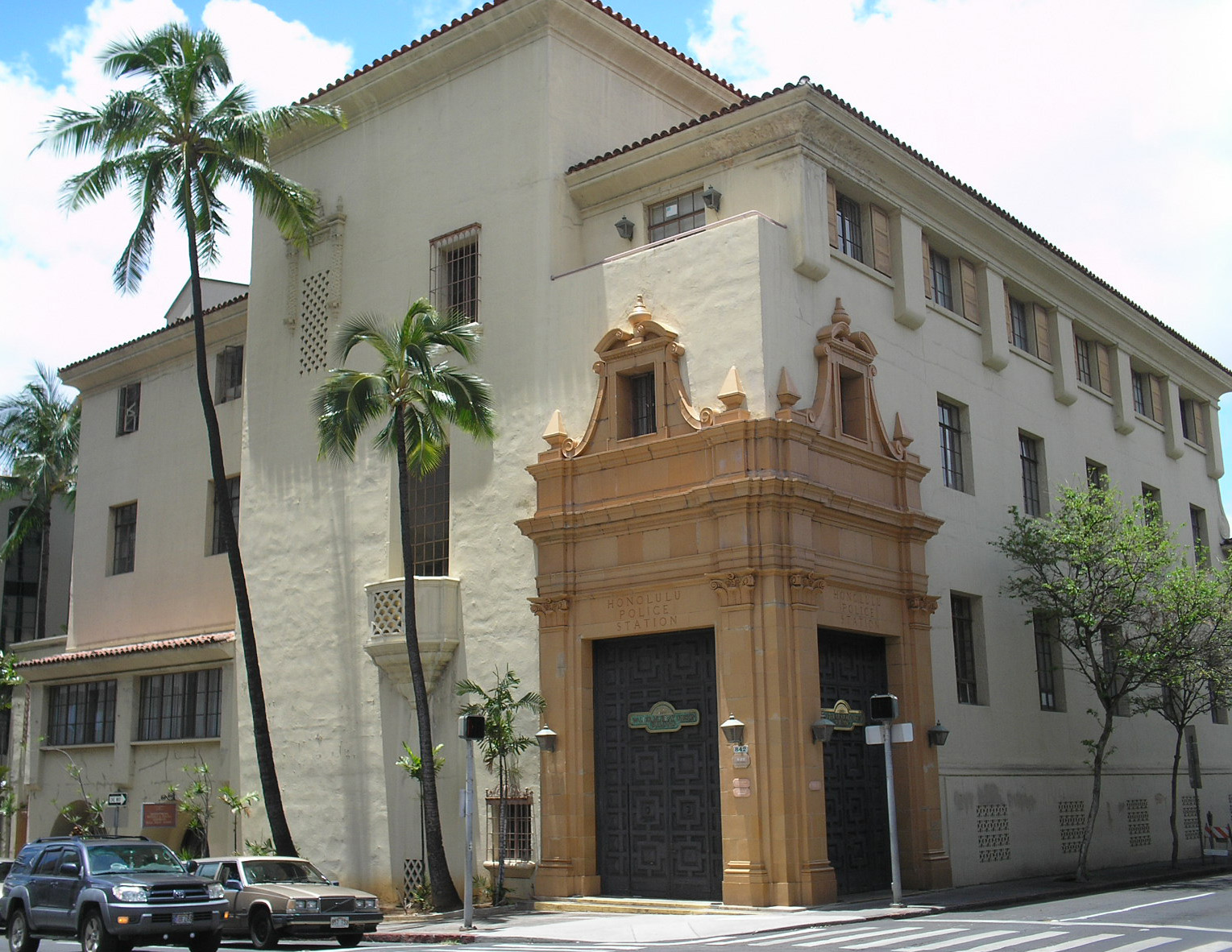
Old Police Station (front), 1931

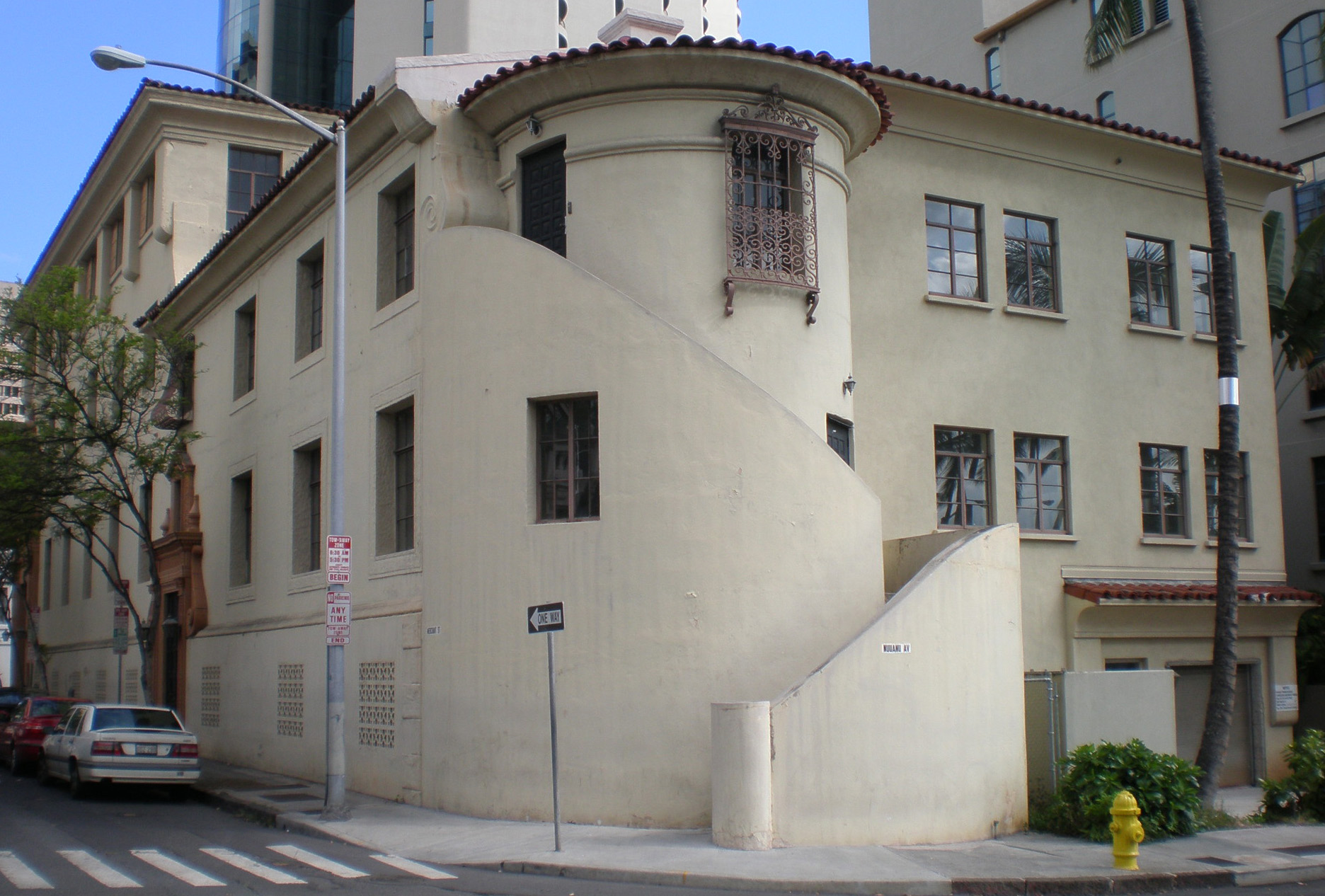
Old Police Station (rear), 1931

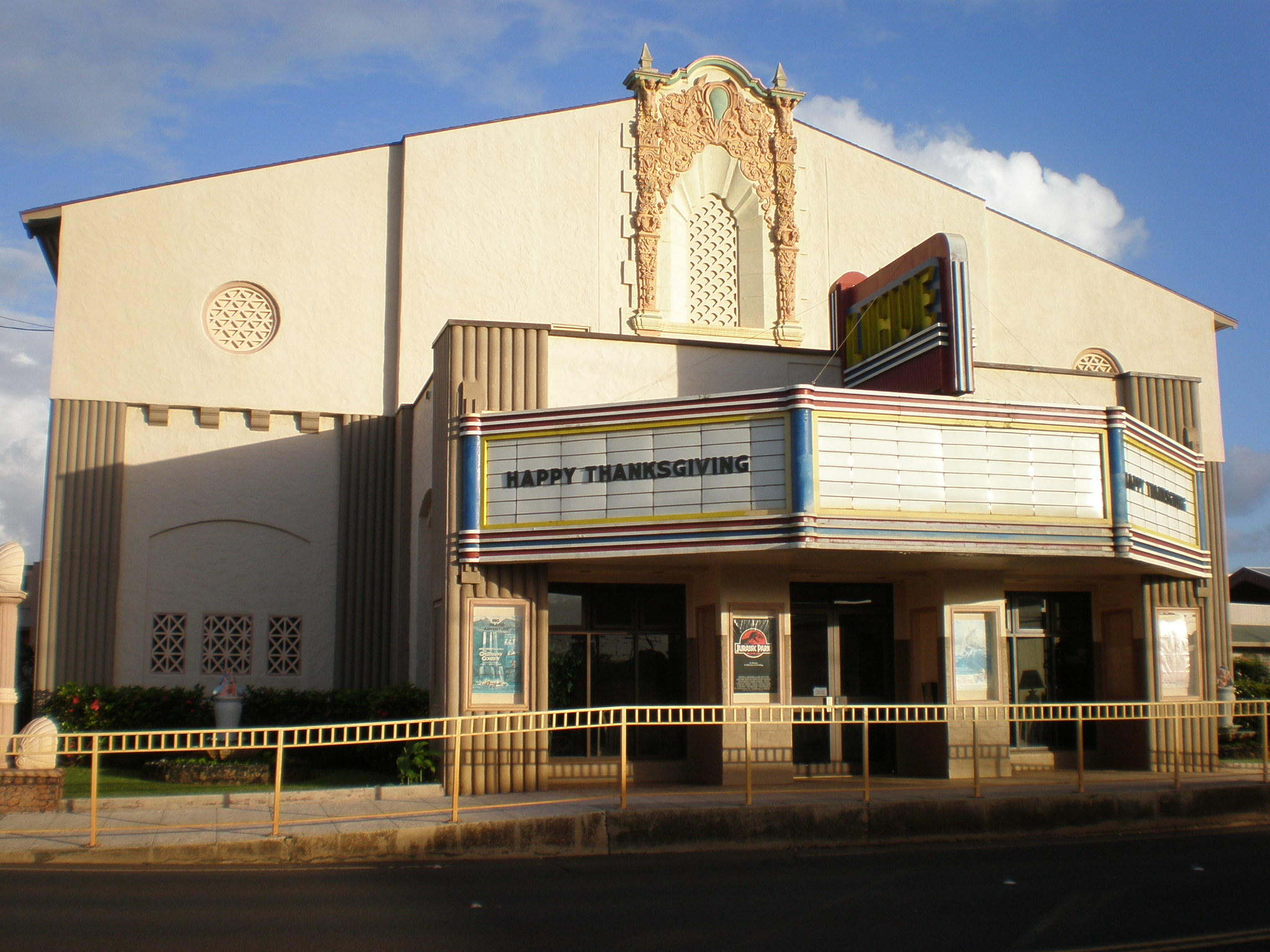
Lihue Theatre, 1931
