= Clinton, Hunt County, Texas =

Clinton, Hood County, Texas
- Unincorporated community
- Location within Texas Location within the United States
- Coordinates: 33°06′12″N 96°14′09″W
- Country: United States
- State: Texas
- County: Hunt
- Elevation: 571 ft (174 m)
- Time zone: UTC-6 (Central (CST))
  - Summer (DST): UTC-5 (CDT)
- Area codes: 430 & 903
- GNIS feature ID: 1332995

Clinton is an unincorporated community in Hunt County, Texas, United States. The community is located on Farm to Market Road 3211, 8 miles (13 km) west-southwest of Greenville.

== History ==
Clinton was founded in 1887 through an agreement between landowner J. M. Massey and the St. Louis Southwestern Railway. The former sold his land in the area to the latter under the condition that they build a depot there; the depot, named Clinton for a railroad official, was built the same year. A post office opened the following year; it closed sometime between 1930 and the 1950s.
