= Clinton (automobile) =

Canadian automobile manufactured 1911–1912

The Clinton was a Canadian automobile manufactured between 1911 and 1912 in Clinton, Ontario. The Clinton Motor Car Company Limited was a descendant of the Clinton Thresher Company, who went out of business in 1908 when the company's factory burnt down.

The car was made as a large tourer, roadster or combination car that could be converted from a passenger car to a light truck. The company highlighted the fact, that the car had no foreign input, with the slogan "Canadian design, Canadian capital, Canadian workmen". No more than eight cars were made, plus an unknown number of combination cars and trucks.
