= Clinton, Virginia =

Unincorporated community in Virginia, United States

Coordinates: 37°32′34″N 78°07′32″W

Clinton is an unincorporated community in Cumberland County, in the U.S. state of Virginia.
