= Clinton Collymore =

Guyanese politician

Clinton Collymore was the Chief Minister within the Ministry of Local Government and Regional Development in Guyana. He is a convert to Hinduism.
