= Clinton Briggs Ripley =

American architect

Clinton Briggs Ripley (February 13, 1849 – February 13, 1922) was an American architect active in Honolulu, Hawaii, from the 1890s until the 1920s.

Ripley was born in Peru, Maine. In 1871, he began his career in Chattanooga, Tennessee, forming Ripley & Co. with William K. Ripley. After living in Nashville, he moved to Los Angeles until settling in Hawaii around 1890.

Ripley became Commissioner of Patents in 1894, then formed a partnership with a junior but well-connected local architect, Charles William Dickey, during the peak of the building boom in 1896–1900. During the downturn that followed, he briefly headed the Concrete Construction Company, then looked for work elsewhere before settling back in Honolulu in 1910 in partnership first with Arthur L. Reynolds, and then with Louis E. Davis from 1913 until his death. (Reynolds went on to design the Aloha Tower, and Davis went on to design President William McKinley High School and many other notable buildings.)

His early work in Downtown Honolulu was in the then popular Richardsonian Romanesque style, as in the old Central Fire Station (1896, remodeled in 1934), the Bishop Estate Building on Merchant Street (1896), the Irwin Block (Nippu Jiji building) on Nuuanu Street (1897), and Progress Block on Fort Street (1897), the last now occupied by Hawaii Pacific University. Among his other notable buildings were the H.P. Baldwin Home (1899, with Dickey) and Hawaii Hall for the new University of Hawaii (1911, with Reynolds).

He died in Oakland, California on his 73rd birthday.

== Gallery ==
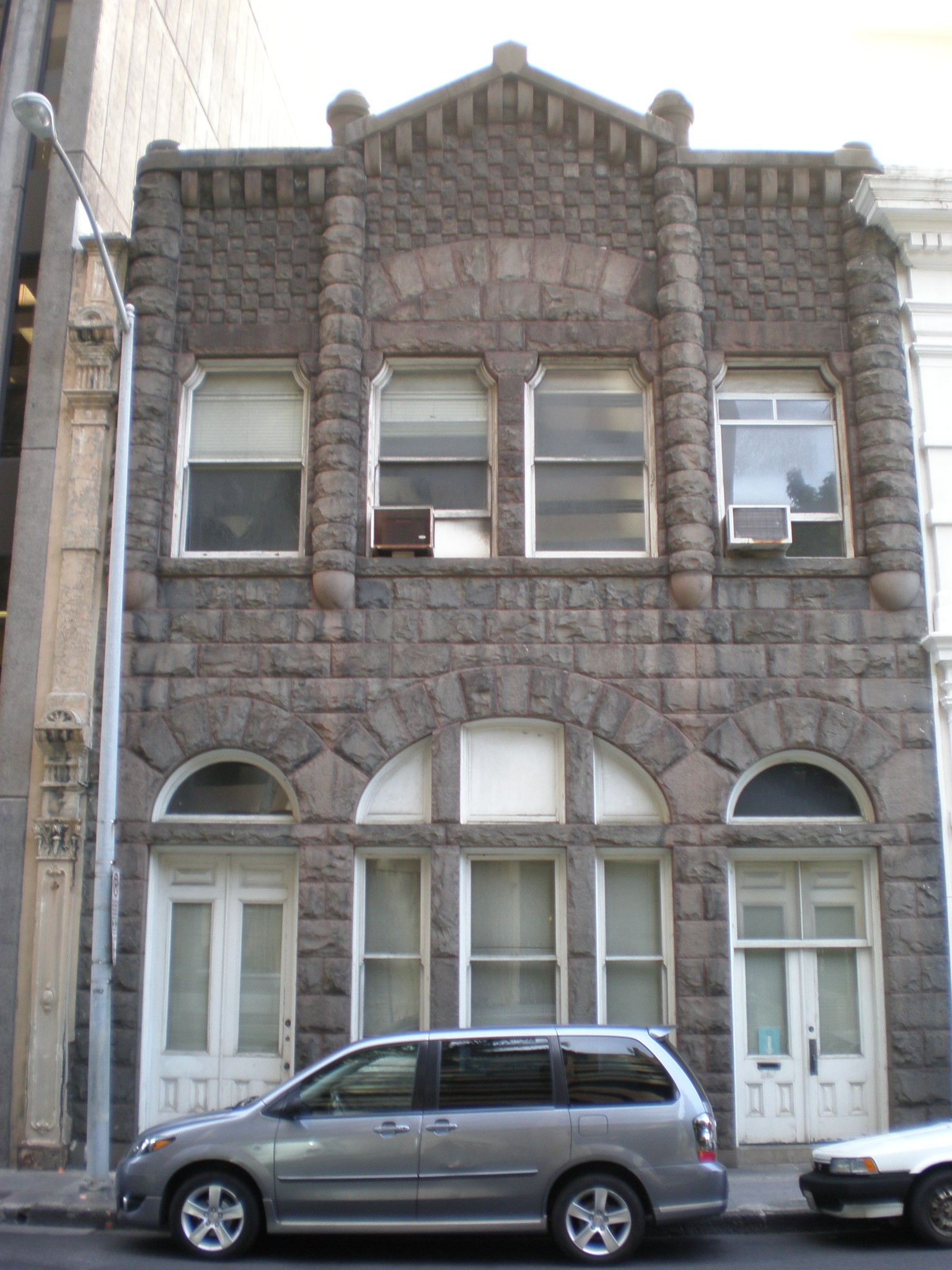
Bishop Estate Building, 1896 (with Dickey)

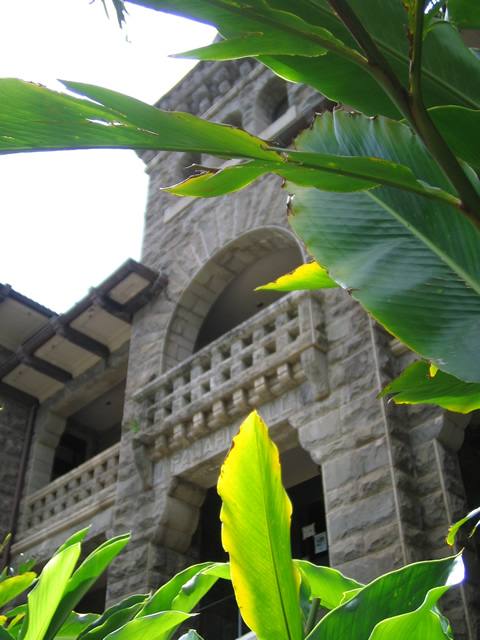
Pauahi Hall, Punahou School, 1896 (with Dickey)

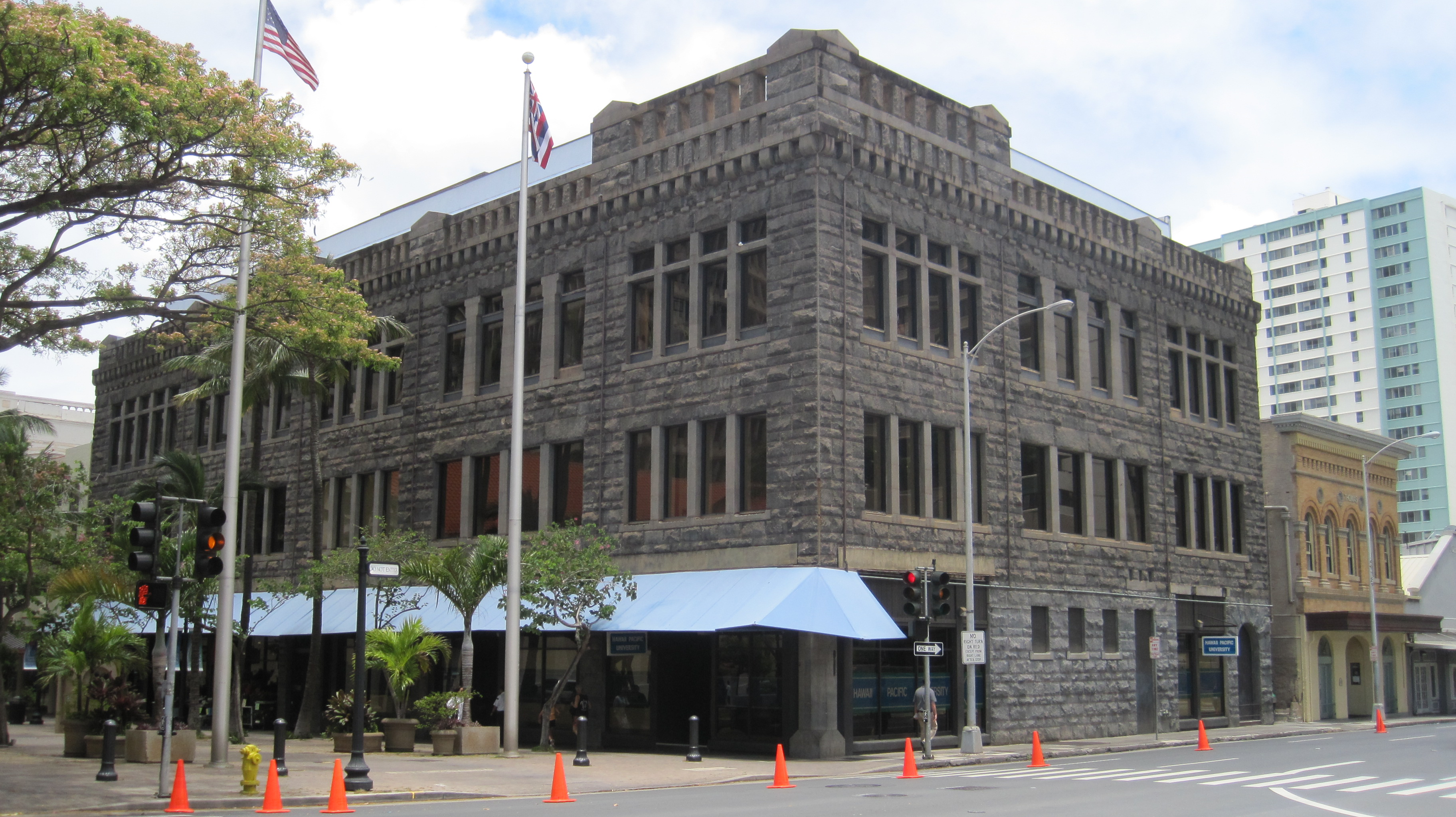
Progress Block, 1897

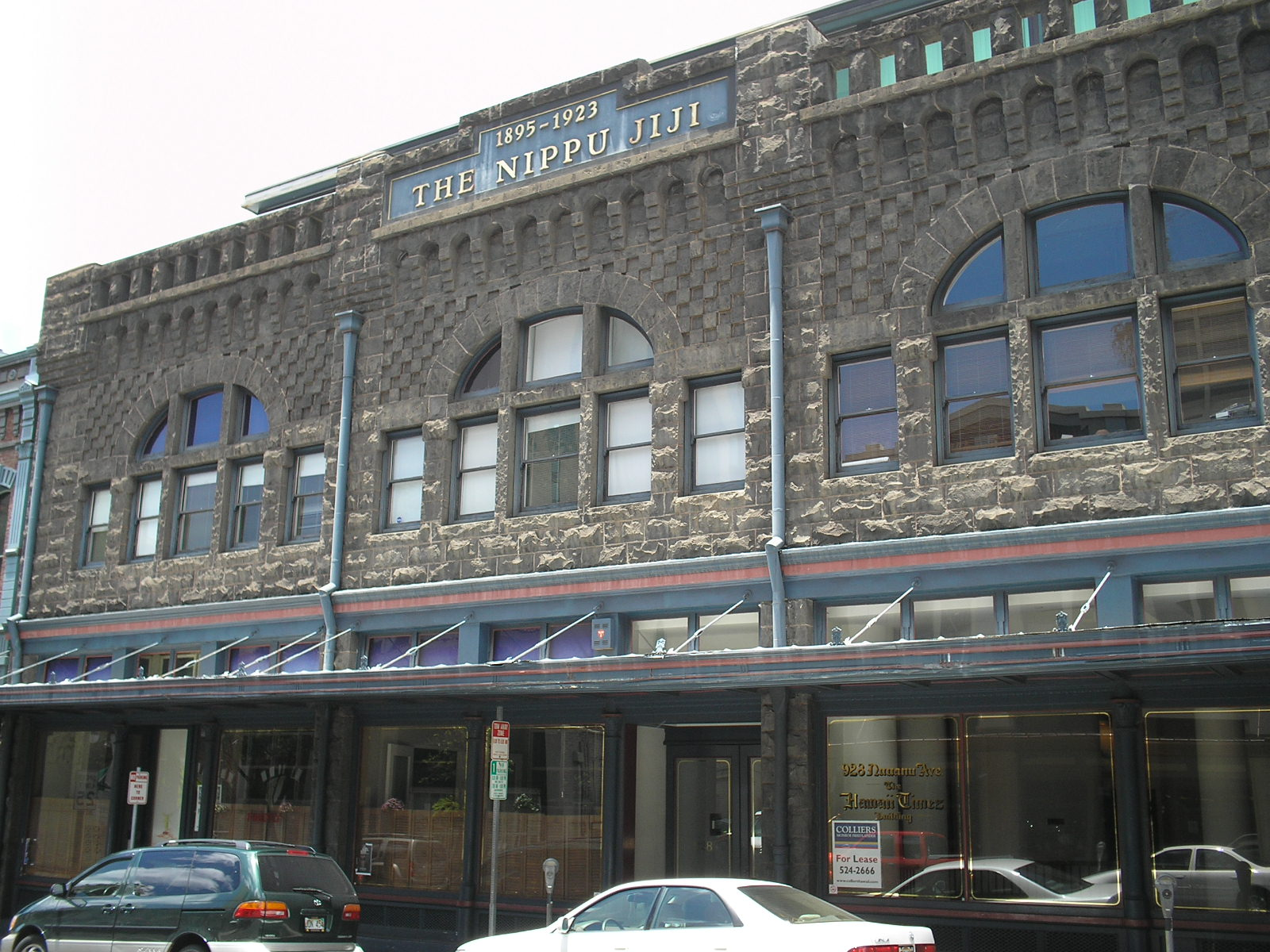
Irwin Block, 1897 (with Dickey); bought by Nippu Jiji (1895-) in 1923

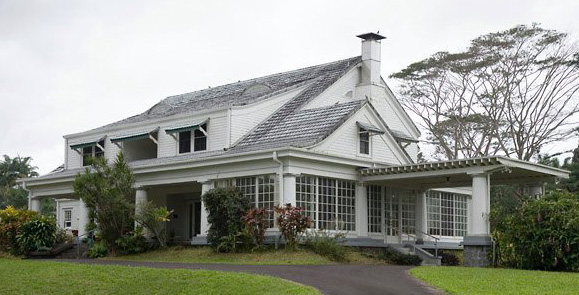
Thomas Guard House, Hilo (with Louis E. Davis)
