= Timeline of Honolulu =

History of the city of Honolulu

Coordinates: 21.3°N 157.816667°W

The following is a timeline of the history of the city of Honolulu, on Oahu, in the U.S. state of Hawaii.

== 1700s-1800s ==
- 1794 - Honolulu’s safe harbour discovered.
- 1795 - Area populated by "Kamehameha's chiefs and followers."
- 1810 - Kamehameha I relocates to inner harbour of Honolulu from Waikiki.
- 1816 - Fort built.
- 1820 - Honolulu becomes capital of Hawaii and the principal residence of the sovereign.
- 1826 - C. Brewer & Co. founded.
- 1833
  - Oahu Charity School founded.
  - Brinsmade, Ladd, and Hooper in business.
- 1836
  - Lahaina, Maui becomes capital from 1837 to 1845.
  - Royal Hawaiian Band founded.
  - Sandwich Island Gazette and Journal of Commerce begins publication.
- 1840
  - Royal School founded.
  - The Polynesian newspaper begins publication.
- 1842 - Kawaiahaʻo Church built.
- 1843
  - Paulet Affair (1843)
  - Cathedral of Our Lady of Peace built.
- 1845
  - The capital is moved from Lahaina to Honolulu, with ʻIolani Palace as the royal residence.
- 1846 - Honolulu Police Department established.
- 1849
  - August–September: French invasion of Honolulu.
  - Hackfeld and Company in business.
- 1850 - City becomes capital of the islands.
- 1851
  - Honolulu Fire Department organized.
  - Castle & Cooke in business.
- 1853
  - Oahu College active.
  - British Club founded.
- 1854 - Melchers Building constructed.
- 1856
  - Pacific Commercial Advertiser newspaper begins publication.
  - Honolulu Sailor's Home opens.
- 1857 - Honolulu Rifles instituted.
- 1858 - Bishop & Co. (bank) founded.>
- 1860 - Queen's Hospital built.
- 1863
  - Population: 14,000 (estimate).
  - Royal Mausoleum of Hawaii built.
- 1865 - Hawaiian Gazette newspaper begins publication.
- 1866 - Wharf constructed.
- 1870 - Post office built.
- 1872
  - Hawaiian Hotel in business.
  - Population: 14,852.
- 1873 - Aliiolani Hale (Parliament House) built.
- 1877 - Kapiolani Park opens.
- 1879
  - ʻIolani Palace built.
  - Honolulu Library and Reading Room Association founded.
- 1884 - Kapuāiwa Building constructed.
- 1886 - Fire in Chinatown.
- 1889 - Bishop Museum and Manoa Chinese Cemetery founded.
- 1890 - Population: 22,907.
- 1891 - Scottish Thistle Club founded.
- 1892
  - Hawaiian Historical Society established.
  - Harbour deepened.
- 1893 - January 17: Overthrow of the Kingdom of Hawaii by Hawaiian League.
- 1894 - Theo H. Davies & Co. in business.
- 1896 - Yamato Shinbun Japanese/English-language newspaper begins publication.
- 1898
  - City becomes part of the U.S. Territory of Hawaii.
  - Honolulu Stock and Bond Exchange established.
- 1899 - U.S. Naval Station, Honolulu established.
- 1900
  - Population: 39,306.
  - Alexander Young Hotel built.
  - Honolulu Japanese Merchants Association and Young Women's Christian Association chapter organized.
  - Alexander & Baldwin incorporated.
  - January 20: Fire in Chinatown.

== 1900s ==
- 1901
  - Streetcar begins operating.
  - Honolulu Shinbun newspaper begins publication.
- 1907 - University of Hawaiʻi, Honolulu County, and Pacific Scientific Institution established.
- 1908 - Honolulu Japanese Sake Brewing Co. in business.
- 1909 - Joseph J. Fern becomes mayor.
- 1910 - Population: 52,183.
- 1912 - Honolulu Star-Bulletin in publication.
- 1913 - Hawaii State Library building constructed.
- 1920
  - John H. Wilson becomes mayor.
  - Mission Houses Museum established.
- 1922
  - Princess Theatre opens.
  - Hawaii Theatre built.
  - KGU signs on the air as Honolulu and Hawaii's first radio station
- 1924 - Central Union Church dedicated.
- 1926 - Honolulu Stadium opens.
- 1927
  - John Rodgers Airport and Honolulu Academy of Arts open.
  - YWCA Building (Honolulu, Hawaii) constructed.
- 1928 - Honolulu Municipal Building constructed.
- 1929 - Honolulu Board of Water Supply established.
- 1930 - Foster Botanical Garden bequeathed to city.
- 1931 - Kapiolani Maternity and Gynecological Hospital active.
- 1932 - Massie Affair criminal trial took place.
- 1936 - Waikiki Theatre opens.
- 1941
  - Roman Catholic Diocese of Honolulu established.
  - December 7: Japanese forces attack US naval base at Pearl Harbor.
- 1947 - Honolulu Zoo established.
- 1948 - Foodland opens its first store.
- 1951 - Chung-Hua Hsin Pao Chinese-language newspaper begins publication.
- 1952 - KGMB signs on the air as Honolulu's and Hawaii's first television station
- 1953 - Cherry Blossom Festival begins.
- 1955 - Waikiki Beach Press newspaper begins publication.
- 1959
  - Honolulu Diamond Sangha founded.
  - Ala Moana Center opens
  - City becomes part of U.S. State of Hawaii
- 1960
  - Hawaii National Bank headquartered in city.
  - Population: 248,034.
- 1961 - August 4: Birth of Barack Obama.
- 1962 - Honolulu International Airport terminal rebuilt.
- 1965 - Foreign trade zone established.
- 1968 - Oceanic Cable begins cable television operations.
- 1969 - Hawaii State Capitol built.
- 1971 - TheBus (public transport) established.
- 1975 - Aloha Stadium opens near city.
- 1980 - Population: 365,048.
- 1986 - Japanese Cultural Center of Hawai‘i founded.
- 1988 - Hawaii Maritime Center opens.
- 1990 - Population: 365,272.
- 1993 - U.S. Kunia Regional SIGINT Operations Center active near city.
- 1996 - City website online.

== 2000s ==
- 2005 - Mufi Hannemann becomes mayor.
- 2010
  - Honolulu Civil Beat begins publication.
  - Kirk Caldwell becomes mayor, succeeded by Peter Carlisle.
  - The Honolulu Star-Advertiser begins publications after the merger of the Advertiser and Star-Bulletin
  - Population: 390,738.
- 2013 - Kirk Caldwell becomes mayor again.
- 2014 - Sit-lie ordinance effected.
- 2023 - Segment 1 of Skyline opens.

== See also ==
- Honolulu history
- List of mayors of Honolulu

== Bibliography ==
Published in the 1800s

- Josiah Conder (1834), "Sandwich Islands", Dictionary of Geography, Ancient and Modern, London: T. Tegg, "Honoruru"
- James Jackson Jarves (1843), "(Honolulu)", Scenes and scenery in the Sandwich Islands, Boston: J. Munroe, OCLC 12254292
- Honolulu Directory, and Historical Sketch of the Hawaiian or Sandwich Islands. Sketches of Hawaiian history and Honolulu directory. Honolulu: Chauncey C. Bennett. 1869.
- Manley Hopkins (1869), "Our Royal City of Honolulu", Hawaii: the past, present, and future of its island-kingdom; an historical account of the Sandwich Islands (Polynesia) (2nd ed.), New York: D. Appleton and Co., OCLC 10329531
- Laura Fish Judd (1880), "Honolulu in 1861 (etc.)", Honolulu, sketches of life, social, political, and religious, in the Hawaiian Islands from 1828 to 1861, New York: A.D.F. Randolph & Co.
- John Ramsay McCulloch (1880), "Sandwich Islands", in Hugh G. Reid (ed.), A Dictionary, Practical, Theoretical and Historical of Commerce and Commercial Navigation, London: Longmans, Green, and Co.
- "Honolulu" . Encyclopædia Britannica. Vol. 12 (9th ed.). 1881. p. 143.
- A.D. Hall (1898), "Honolulu", Hawaii, New York: Street & Smith, OCLC 10414631
- Charles Morris (1899), "Honolulu", Our Island Empire: a Hand-book of Cuba, Porto Rico, Hawaii, and the Philippine Islands, Philadelphia: J.B. Lippincott Company, OCLC 541085
- John L. Stevens (1900), "Honolulu", Riches and Marvels of Hawaii, Philadelphia, Pa: Edgewood Publishing Company

Published in the 1900s

- "Honolulu", Chambers's Encyclopaedia, London: W. & R. Chambers, 1901
- Hawaiian Almanac and Annual for 1902. Honolulu: Thos. G. Thrum. 1901.
- "Honolulu" . Encyclopædia Britannica. Vol. 13 (11th ed.). 1910. pp. 659–660.
- Ferdinand J.H. Schnack (1915), "Honolulu (etc).", Aloha Guide; the Standard Handbook of Honolulu and the Hawaiian Islands, Printed by Honolulu Star-Bulletin
- Views of Honolulu, Honolulu: Hawaiian Jewelry and Novelty Co., 1919, OCLC 5950429, OL 25181858M
- Charles E. Peterson (1952). "Concrete Blocks, Honolulu, 1870s". Journal of the Society of Architectural Historians. 11 (3): 27–29. doi:10.2307/987613. JSTOR 987613.
- Gavan Daws (1967). "Honolulu in the 19th Century: Notes on the Emergence of Urban Society in Hawaii". Journal of Pacific History. 2: 77–96. doi:10.1080/00223346708572103. JSTOR 25167896.
- George Thomas Kurian (1994), "Honolulu", World Encyclopedia of Cities, vol. 1: North America, Santa Barbara, Calif.: ABC-CLIO, OL 1431653M (fulltext via Open Library)
- Trudy Ring and Robert M. Salkin, ed. (1995). "Honolulu". Americas. International Dictionary of Historic Places. Routledge. p. 283+. ISBN 978-1-134-25930-4.
- Richard A. Greer (1998). "Along the Old Honolulu Waterfront". Hawaiian Journal of History. Vol. 32. Hawaii Historical Society. pp. 53–66. hdl:10524/430.
- "Hawaii: Honolulu", USA, Let's Go, New York: St. Martin's Press, 1999, OL 24937240M

Published in the 2000s

- Frederick Lau (2004). "Serenading the Ancestors: Chinese Qingming Festival in Honolulu". Yearbook for Traditional Music. 36: 128–143. doi:10.1017/S074015580002049X. JSTOR 20058795.
