= Prince Kuhio Federal Building =

U.S. federal government building in Hawaiʻi

Prince Jonah Kūhiō Kalanianaʻole Federal Building and United States Courthouse
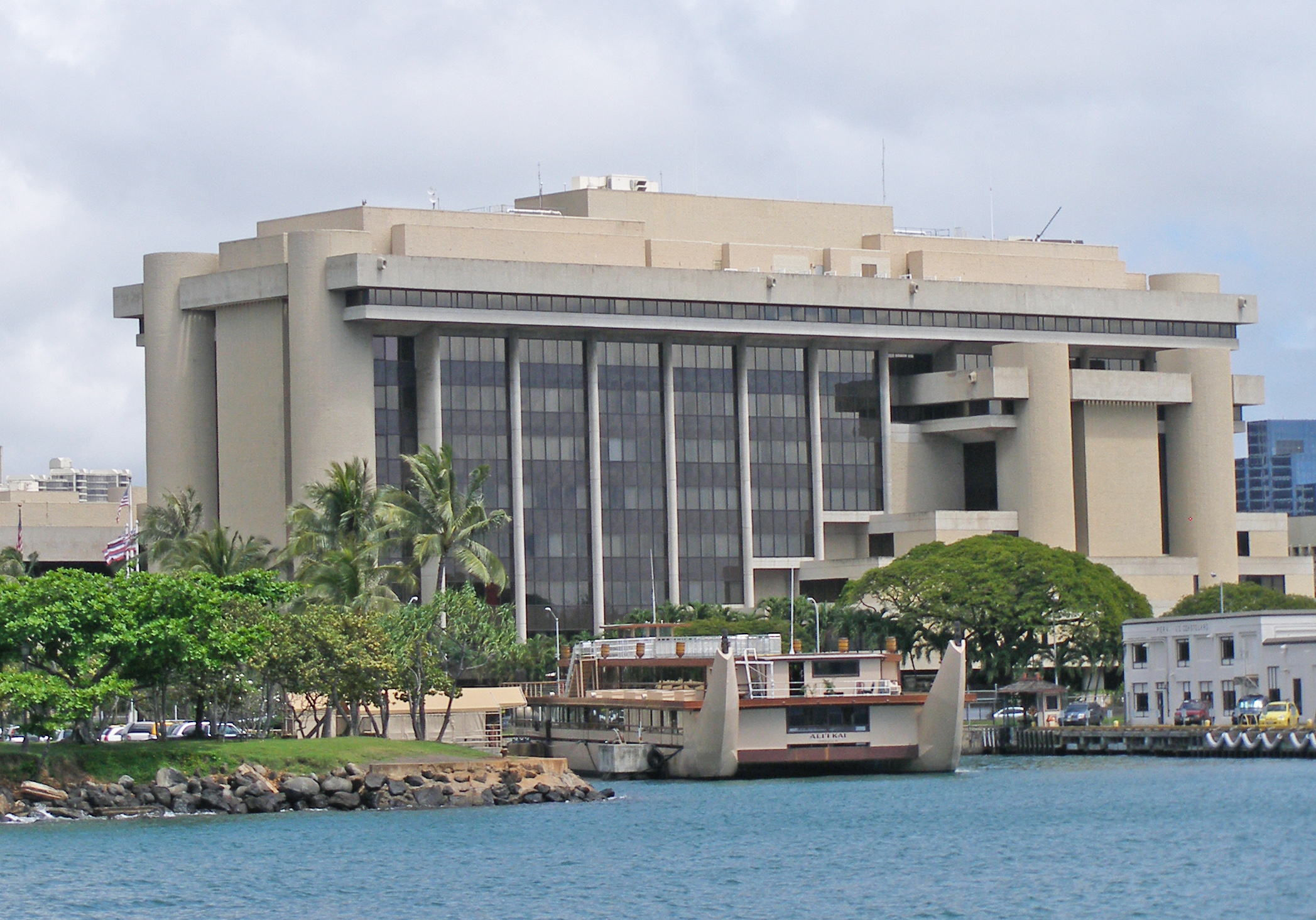
- The building viewed near Honolulu Harbor
- Interactive map of the Prince Jonah Kūhiō Kalanianaʻole Federal Building and United States Courthouse area

General information
- Type: Courthouse and office building
- Location: Honolulu, Hawaii
- Coordinates: 21°18′13″N 157°51′44″W
- Completed: 1977
- Owner: United States federal government

Technical details
- Floor area: 929,857 square feet (86,386.5 m^{2})

Design and construction
- Architect: Architects Hawaii

The Prince Kūhiō Federal Building, formally the Prince Jonah Kūhiō Kalanianaʻole Federal Building and United States Courthouse, is the official seat of the United States federal government and its local branches of various agencies and departments in the state of Hawaiʻi. Its address is 300 Ala Moana Boulevard, Honolulu, Hawaii 96850.

The building was completed in 1977 with a total of 929,857 square feet (86,386.5 m^{2}) of working space. It houses the United States District Court for the District of Hawaii, the United States Attorney for the District of Hawaii, the United States Court of Appeals for the Ninth Circuit (Honolulu Division), the offices of Hawaii's U.S. Senators, the offices of Hawaii's U.S. Representatives for Hawaii's 1st congressional district and Hawaii's 2nd congressional district, and branch offices of the United States Secret Service, United States Probation and Pretrial Services System, Department of Homeland Security, United States Department of Justice, Central Intelligence Agency, Federal Bureau of Investigation, Internal Revenue Service, Department of Veterans Affairs, among other entities.

The building was named after Prince Jonah Kūhiō Kalanianaʻole, heir to the throne of the overthrown Kingdom of Hawaiʻi, who served as Republican territorial delegate to the United States Congress from 1903 through 1922. It was built on part of the former US Army Fort Armstrong, which was named for Samuel C. Armstrong (1839–1893), son of Hawaiian missionaries. Across Ala Moana Boulevard is the Aloha Tower at the Honolulu harbor. Other parts of Fort Armstrong became a container terminal for military supplies.

The Prince Kūhiō Building was constructed to replace the aging Federal Court, Customs House and Post Office building fronting ʻIolani Palace and adjacent to Aliʻiōlani Hale which had been built in 1922 and expanded in 1931. After being mostly vacant, the old building was renovated and put up for sale. The old building was given back to the state of Hawaiʻi and was renamed the King David Kalākaua Building in December 2003.

Construction of the Prince Kūhiō Federal Building was not without controversy. The General Services Administration wanted a simple tall office tower, while local architects argued for a building more appropriate to Hawaii. Statutes provided that all buildings between the shoreline and the foot of Punchbowl Crater could not be taller than the Hawaiʻi State Capitol. The federal government, not legally limited by local statutes, defied the statutes and constructed the building as the tallest structure in the path of the capitol building's view of the shoreline. The complex includes ten stories of offices (including a penthouse level), connected by an enclosed bridge to a six-story courthouse building (including basement).

The Prince Kūhiō Federal Building was designed by Joseph G.F. Farrell's firm Architects Hawaii. Other government buildings designed by the firm include the capitol building of Palau, which opened in 2006. The building was selected for $121 million of renovations as part of the American Recovery and Reinvestment Act of 2009. The plan is to make the building more efficient by upgrading its mechanical, electrical, fire-safety, and plumbing systems. It had already been cited as an efficient building by the Energy Star program. Traces of asbestos were discovered during the first phase. The second phase of construction was approved in March 2011.

== Gallery ==
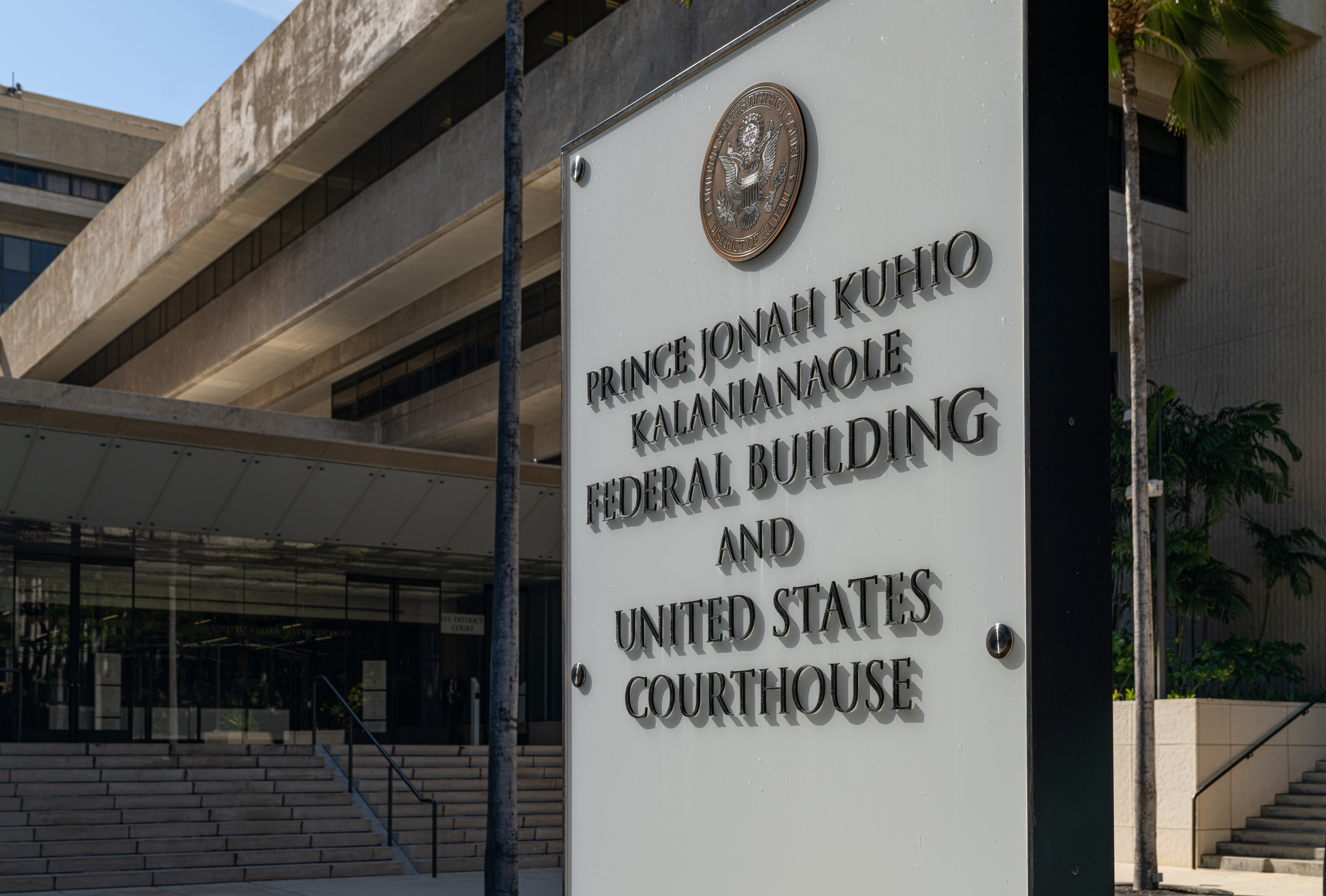
Building sign for Prince Kuhio Federal Building

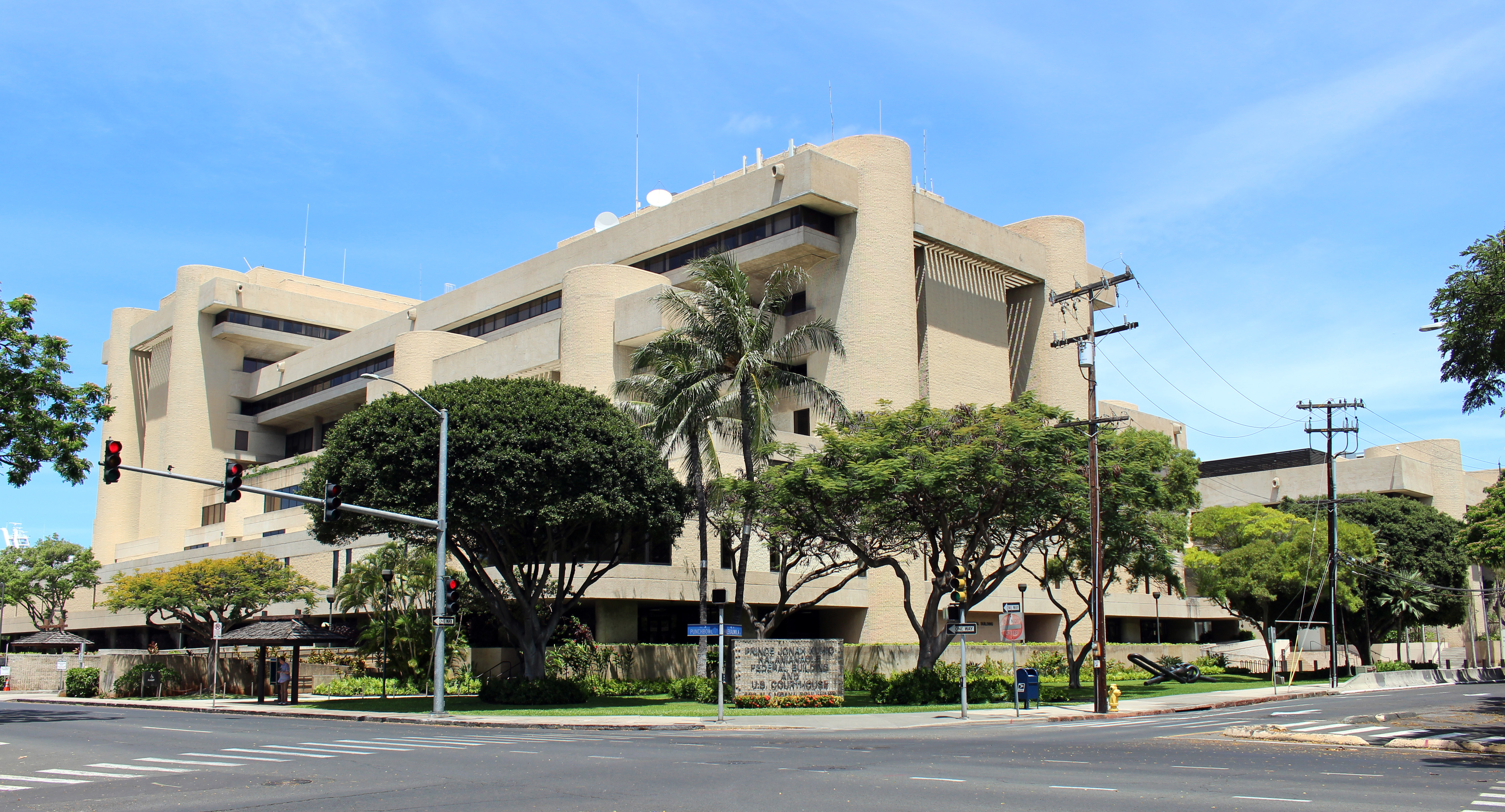
The building as seen from its eastern corner
