= Honolulu Hale =

Seat of government of Honolulu, Hawaiʻi

- U.S. Historic district – Contributing property
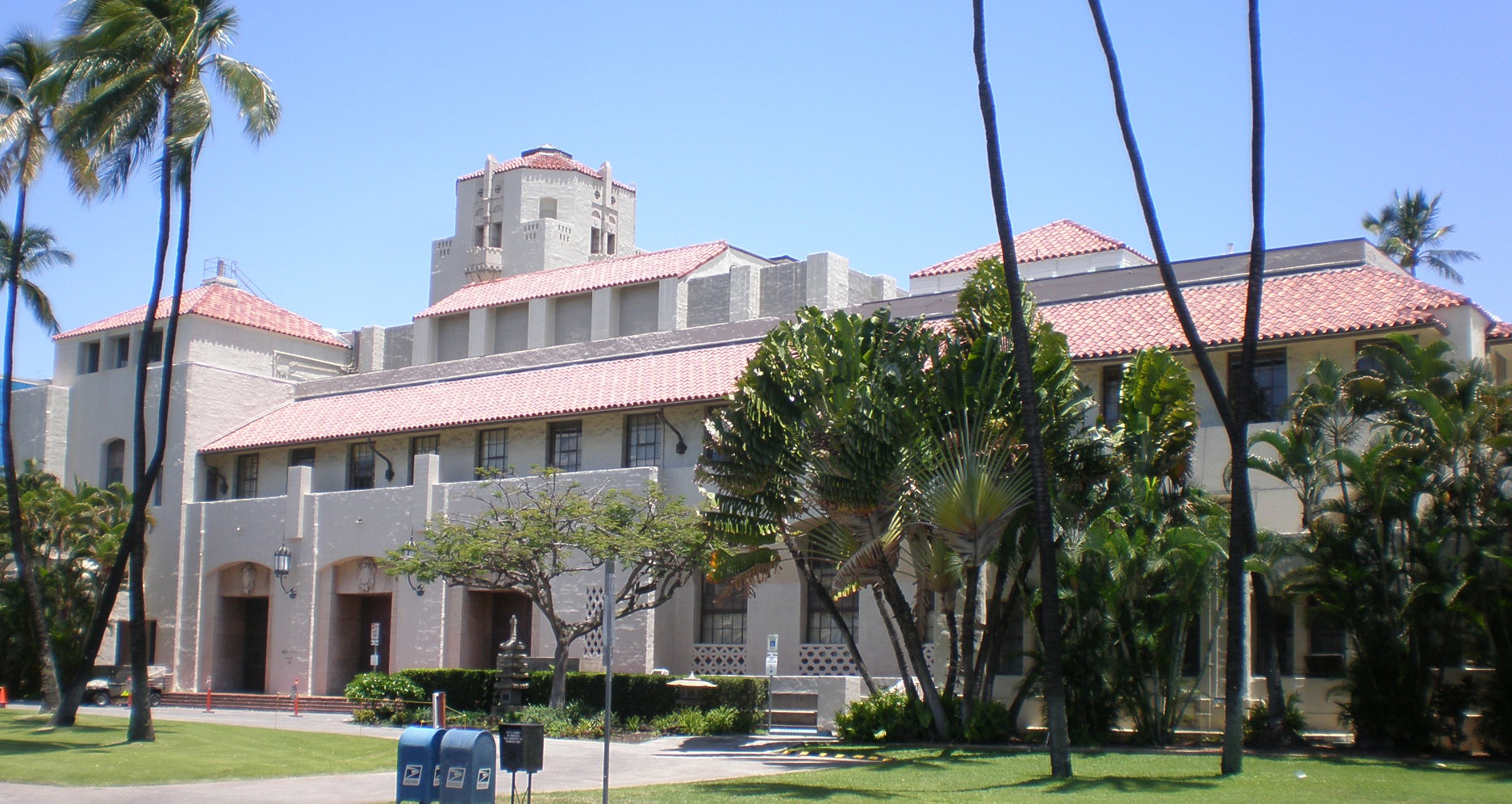
- Front elevation along King St.

- Location within Hawaii
- Location: 530 S. King St., Honolulu, Hawaii
- Coordinates: 21°18.279′N 157°51.433′W
- Built: 1928
- Architect: C.W. Dickey & Hart Wood, Robert Miller, Rothwell Kangeter & Lester
- Architectural style: Italianate Spanish Colonial Revival style
- Part of: Hawaii Capital Historic District (ID78001020)
- Added to NRHP: 1 December 1978

Honolulu Hale (originally called the Honolulu Municipal Building), located on 530 South King Street in downtown Honolulu in the City & County of Honolulu, Hawaiʻi, is the official seat of government of the city and county, site of the chambers of the Mayor of Honolulu and the Honolulu City Council.

In the Hawaiian language, hale (pronounced HAH-leh) means house or building. Honolulu Hale means Honolulu House (although the Hawaiian language word order would be Hale Honolulu). In 1978, it was listed as a contributing property to the Hawaii Capital Historic District, which is listed on the National Register of Historic Places.

== History ==
Honolulu Hale was an idea started by Joseph J. Fern. Before becoming a mayor-council type of government, Honolulu was administered by the Board of Supervisors. After the creation of the now-defunct County of Oʻahu, the Board of Supervisors met in city halls located in various downtown Honolulu locations. Supervisor Fern had a vision of a permanent home for the fledgling municipal government, which had only been created in 1900 upon passage of the Hawaiian Organic Act. When the County of Oʻahu and the Board of Supervisors dissolved in 1907 and established the City & County of Honolulu, Fern became its first mayor and began making preliminary plans for the construction of a city hall. Unfortunately, Fern died in 1920 of diabetes before he could persuade residents of the need for a permanent city hall. Mayor John H. Wilson, who was also the Honolulu Chapter President of the American Association of Engineers, carried on Fern's dream.

Honolulu Hale was finally completed in 1928 with the help of every major architect in town—C.W. Dickey, Hart Wood, Robert Miller, and Rothwell Kangeter & Lester—but did not open for business until the following year. It was built in an Italianate Spanish Colonial Revival style that was popular in the islands at the time. Its interior courtyard, staircase, and open ceiling were modeled after the Bargello in Florence. Einar Peterson was commissioned to paint frescoes in the interior while Mario Valdastri was commissioned to install intricate stonework. In 1951, two three-story wings were added to the original structure.

A new, high-rise Honolulu Municipal Building was later constructed at 650 South King Street. In 2006, it was renamed the Frank F. Fasi Municipal Building in honor of Frank Fasi, the city's longest-serving mayor.

Surrounding Honolulu Hale are other prominent historic and artistic landmarks: Aliʻiōlani Hale, Hawaiʻi State Capitol, ʻIolani Palace, Kawaiahaʻo Church, Sky Gate (a 24-foot (7.3 m) high sculpture by Isamu Noguchi), and the Territorial Building.

== Gallery ==
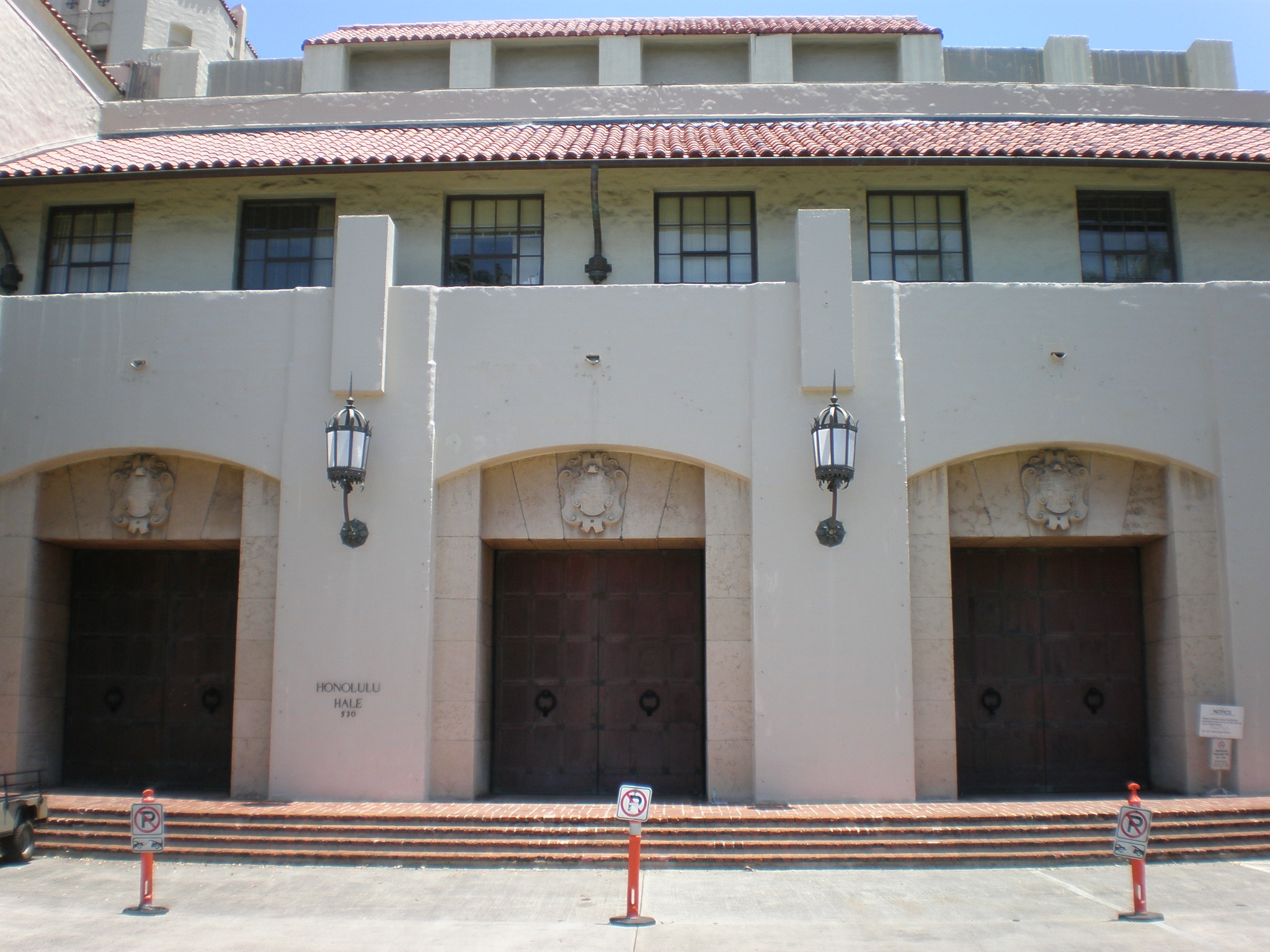
Front doors facing King Street

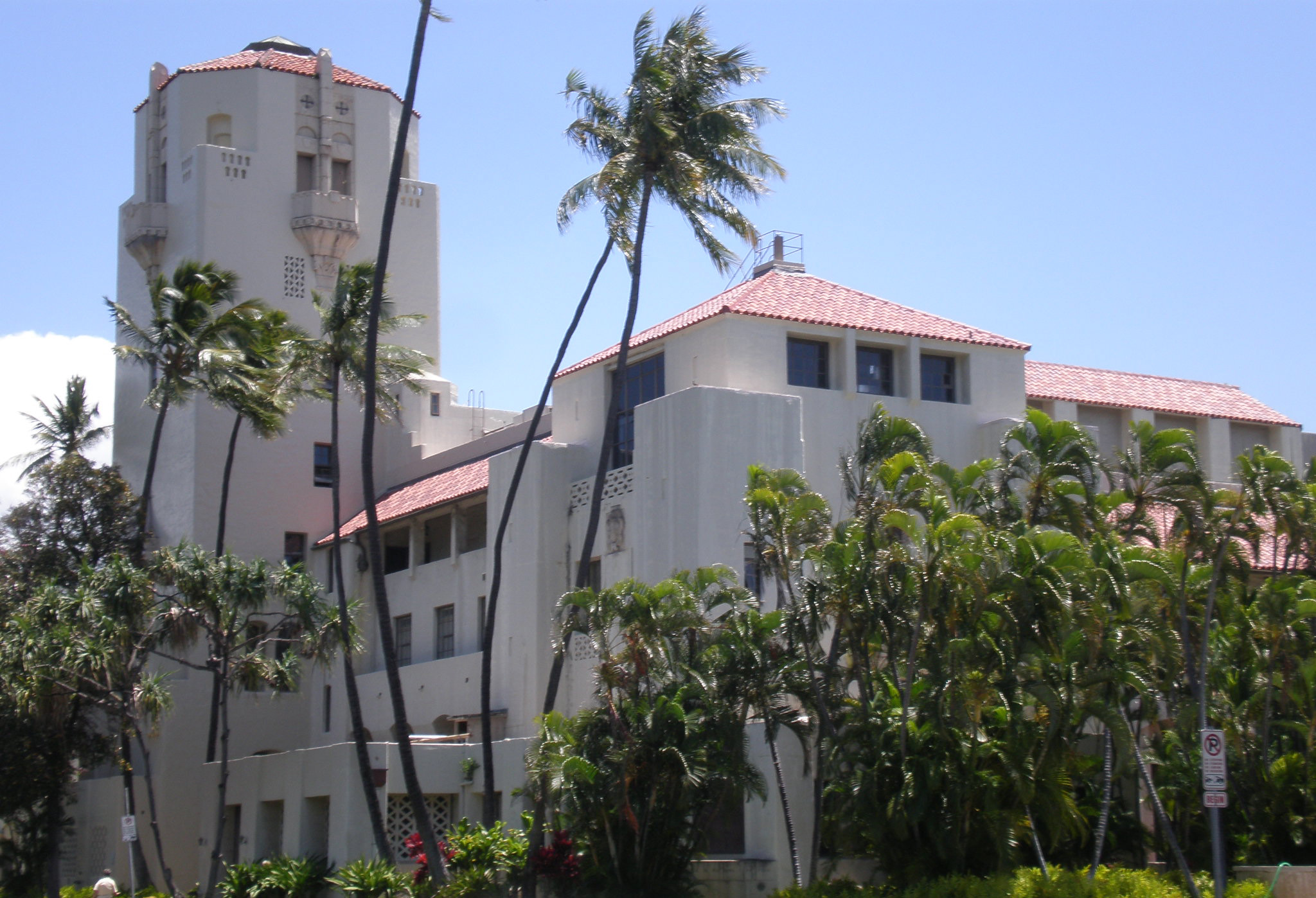
Corner view, Punchbowl and King Streets

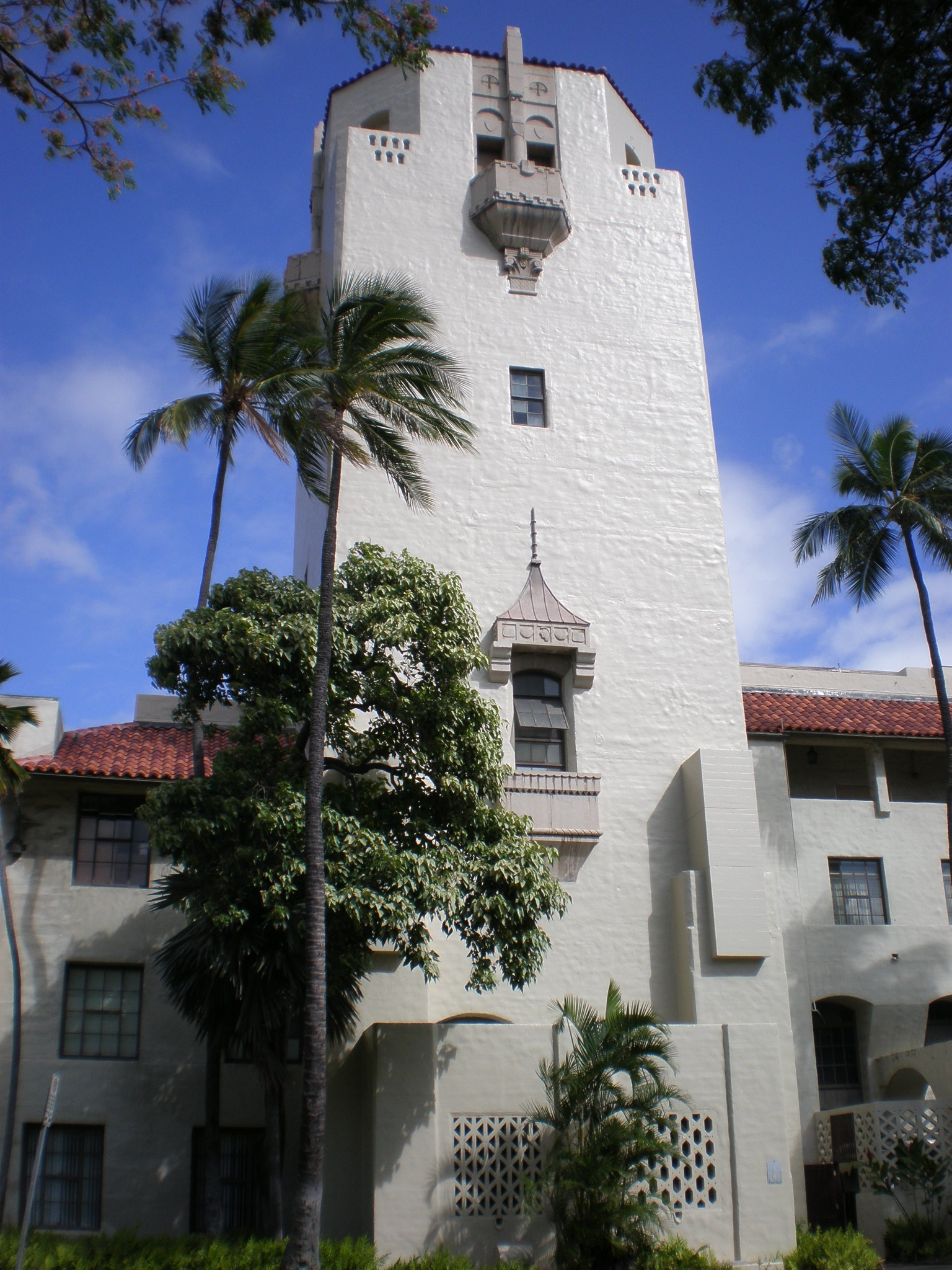
Tower viewed from Punchbowl Street

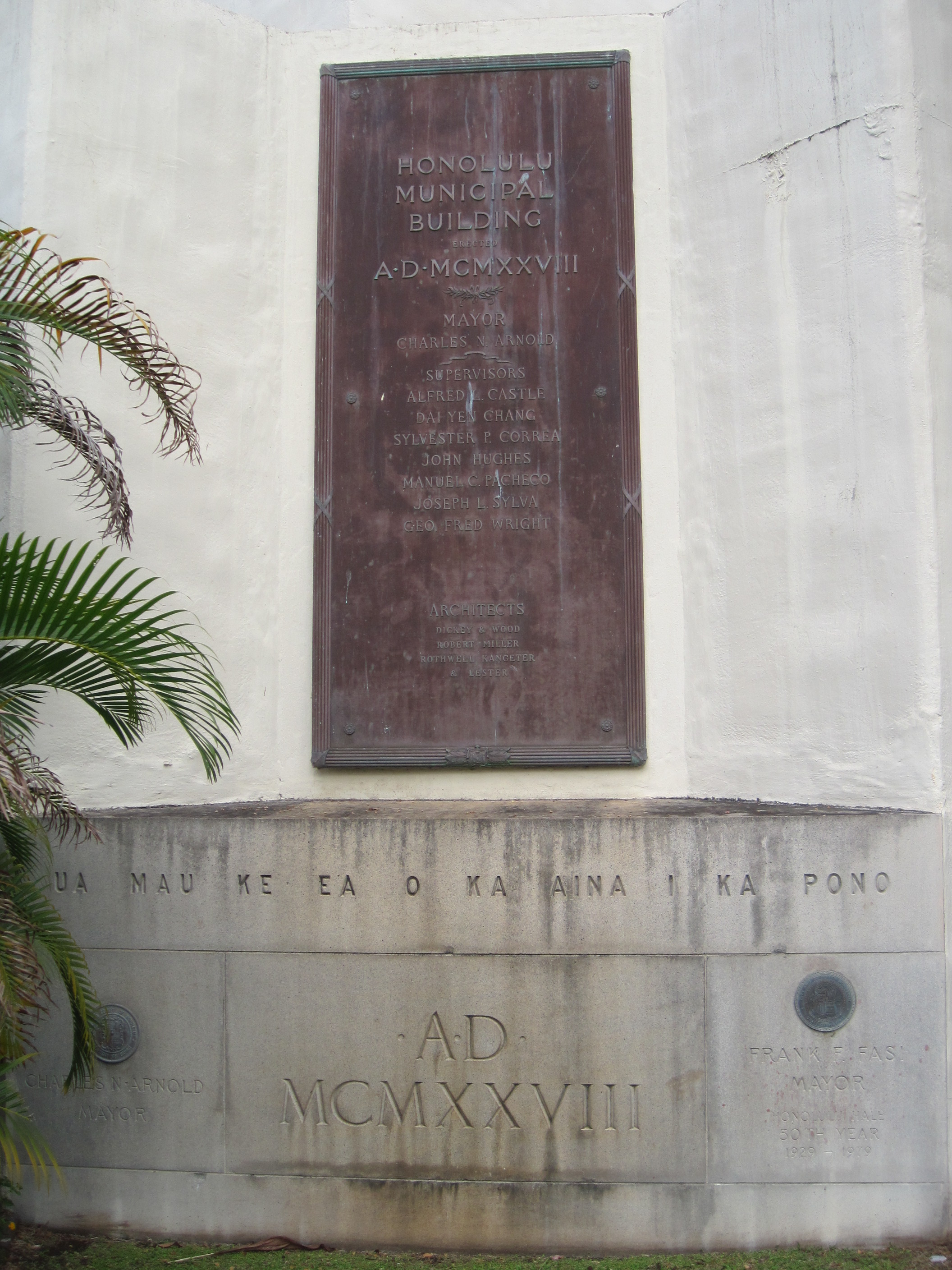
Dedication plaque (1928)

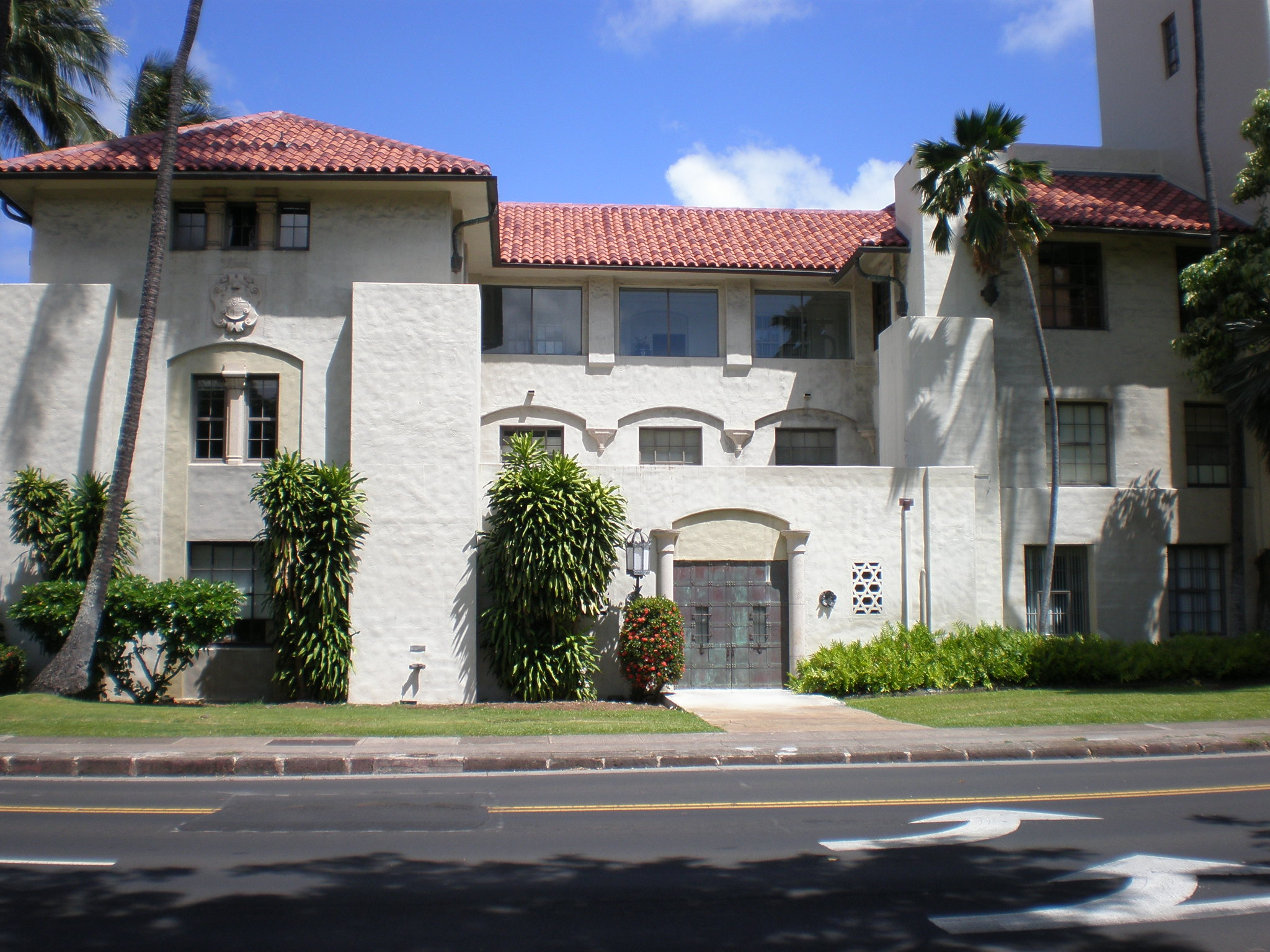
New wing (1951) from Punchbowl Street

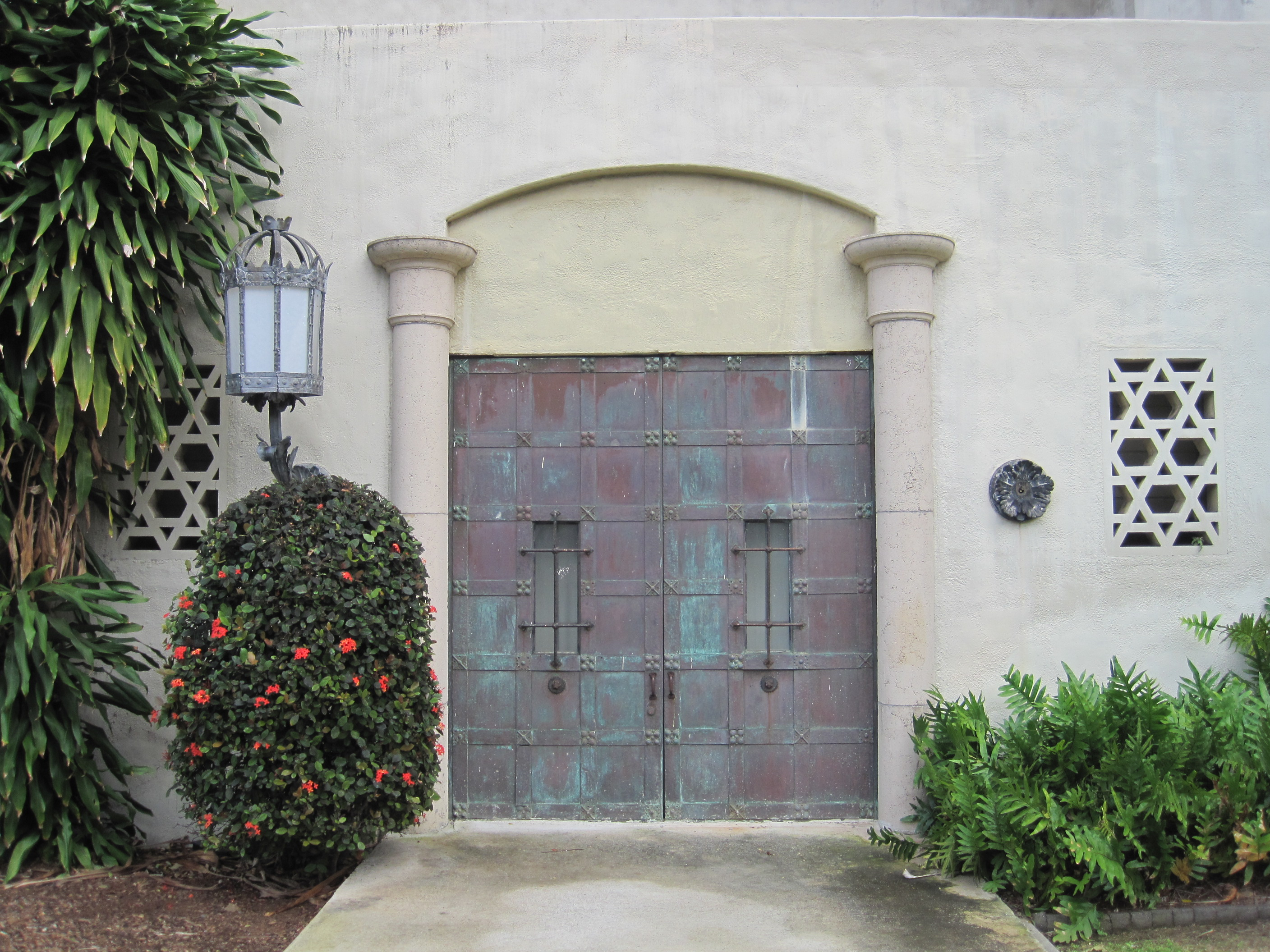
Side door of new wing on Punchbowl Street

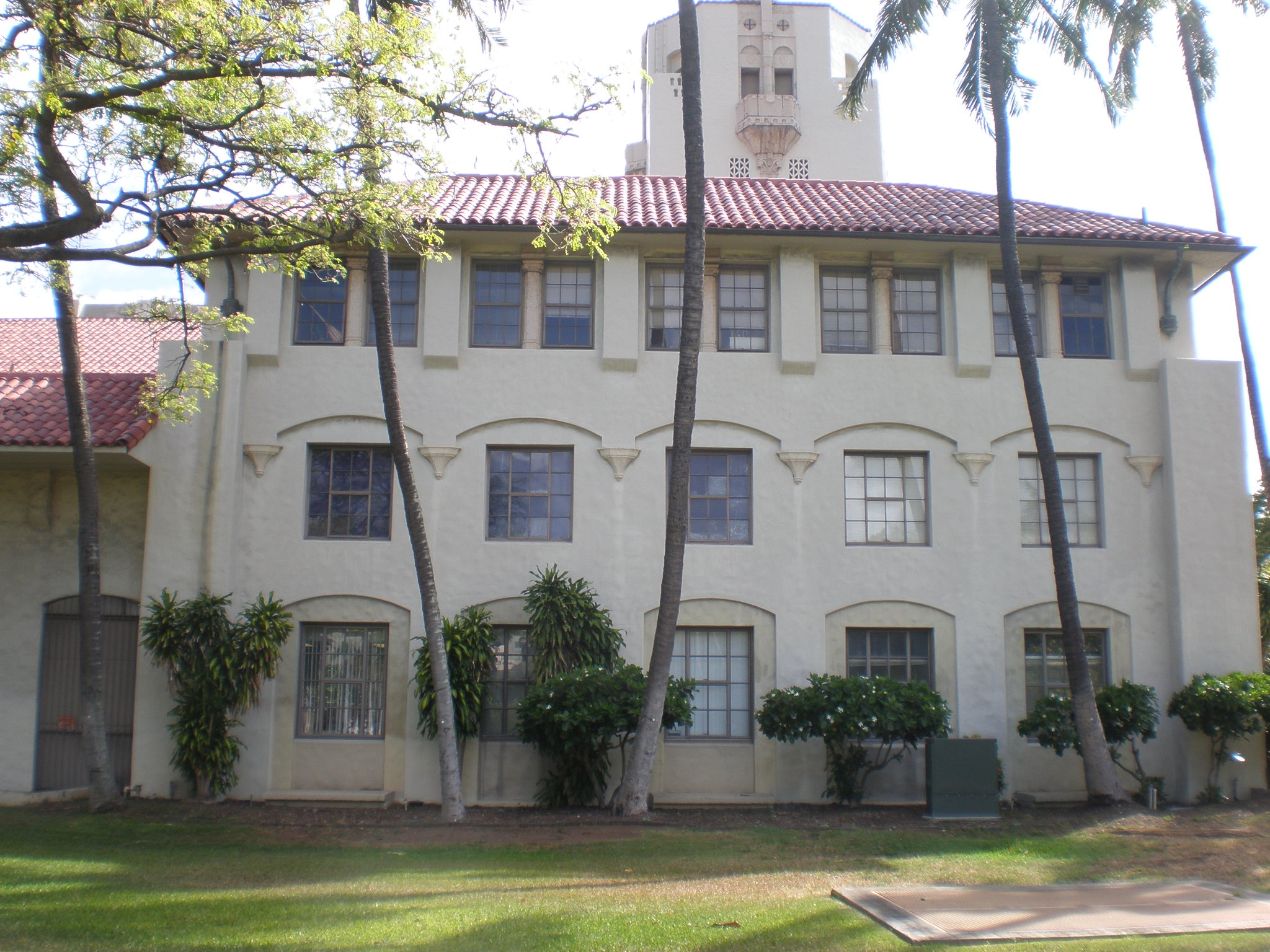
Rear view of new wing (1951)
