= Territorial Building =

- Territorial State Office Building
- U.S. Historic district – Contributing property
- Hawaiʻi Register of Historic Places
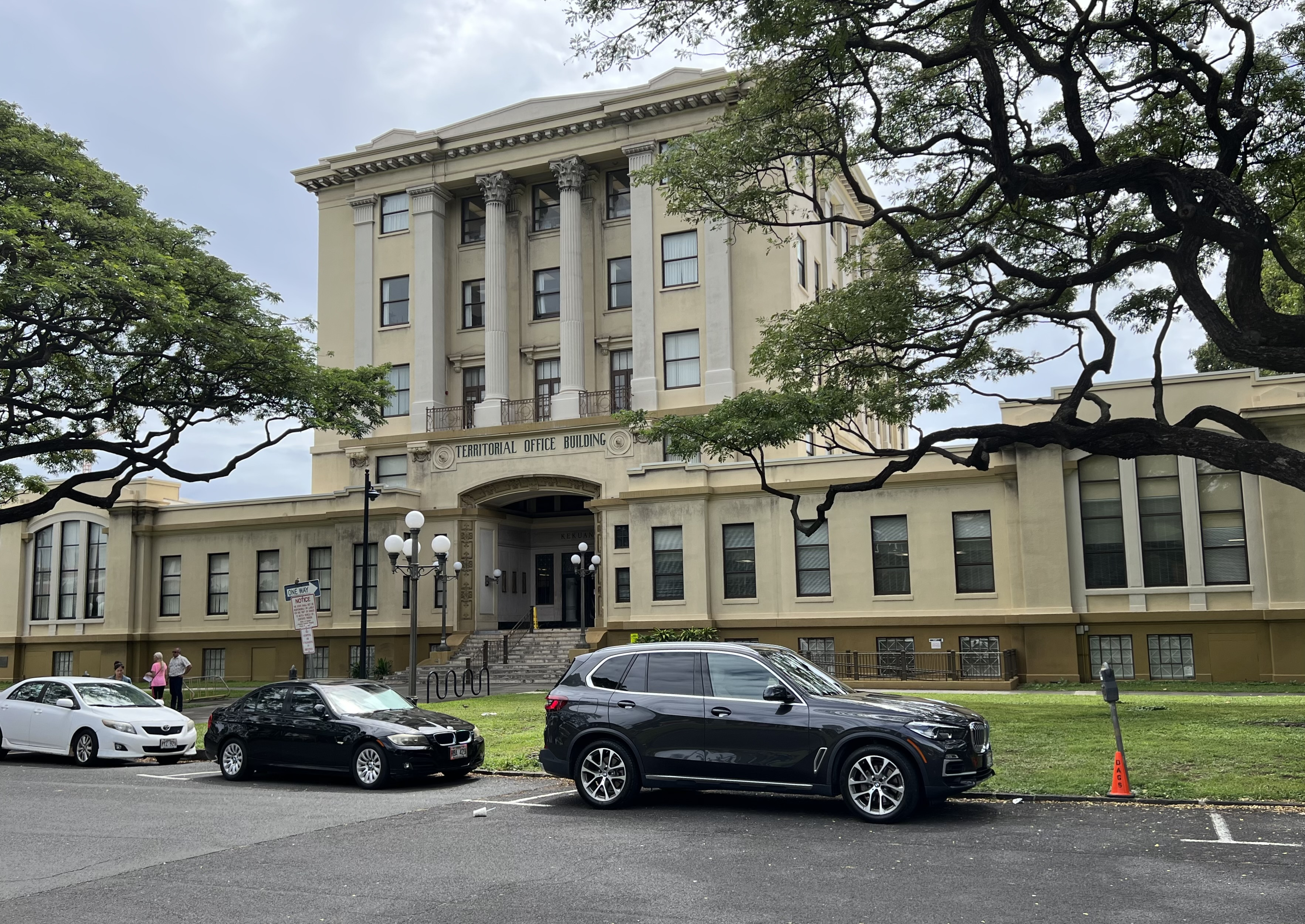
- Territorial Building, March 2023
- Location: 465 S. King St., Honolulu, HI
- Coordinates: 21°18′18″N 157°51′31″W
- Built: 1926
- Architect: Arthur Reynolds
- Architectural style: Classical Revival
- Part of: Hawaii Capital Historic District (ID78001020)
- Designated CP: December 1, 1978

The Territorial Building is a government building of the Territory of Hawaiʻi.

== Description ==
The building is located at 465 South King Street in downtown Honolulu, Hawaiʻi. The Territorial Building was designed by the architect Arthur Reynolds, in the Classical Revival architectural style. Building started in 1925 and was finished in 1926. A four-story tower sits atop a two-story base, with decoration only in the public areas. The front includes a large stairway with double landings, with massive columns for decoration. The central lobby has a leaded glass dome depicting the seal of Hawaii.

It is also called Kekuanaoa Building after the royal politician Mataio Kekūanaōʻa (1793–1868).

The building is adjacent to Aliʻiolani Hale and within walking distance of the Hawaiʻi State Capitol, Hawaiʻi State Library, ʻIolani Palace and Kawaiahao Church. The area was placed on the National Register of Historic Places in 1978 as the Hawaii Capital Historic District.

The Territorial State Office Building was originally designed for the United States Federal Government to house Hawaii Territorial Administrative offices. It now hosts the primary offices of the Public Utilities Commission, the Department of the Attorney General Investigations Division, the Hawaii Criminal Justice Data Center and other state offices.

== In popular culture ==
During season nine (1976) of the television series Hawaii Five-O, Steve McGarrett and his men had their offices in the Territorial Building rather than their usual home at the ʻIolani Palace, which was undergoing renovations at the time. In the 2010 remake, the building facade serves as the Hawaii Five-0 (2010 TV series) crime lab.
