= King David Kalakaua Building =

- U.S. Post Office, Customhouse, and Courthouse
- U.S. National Register of Historic Places
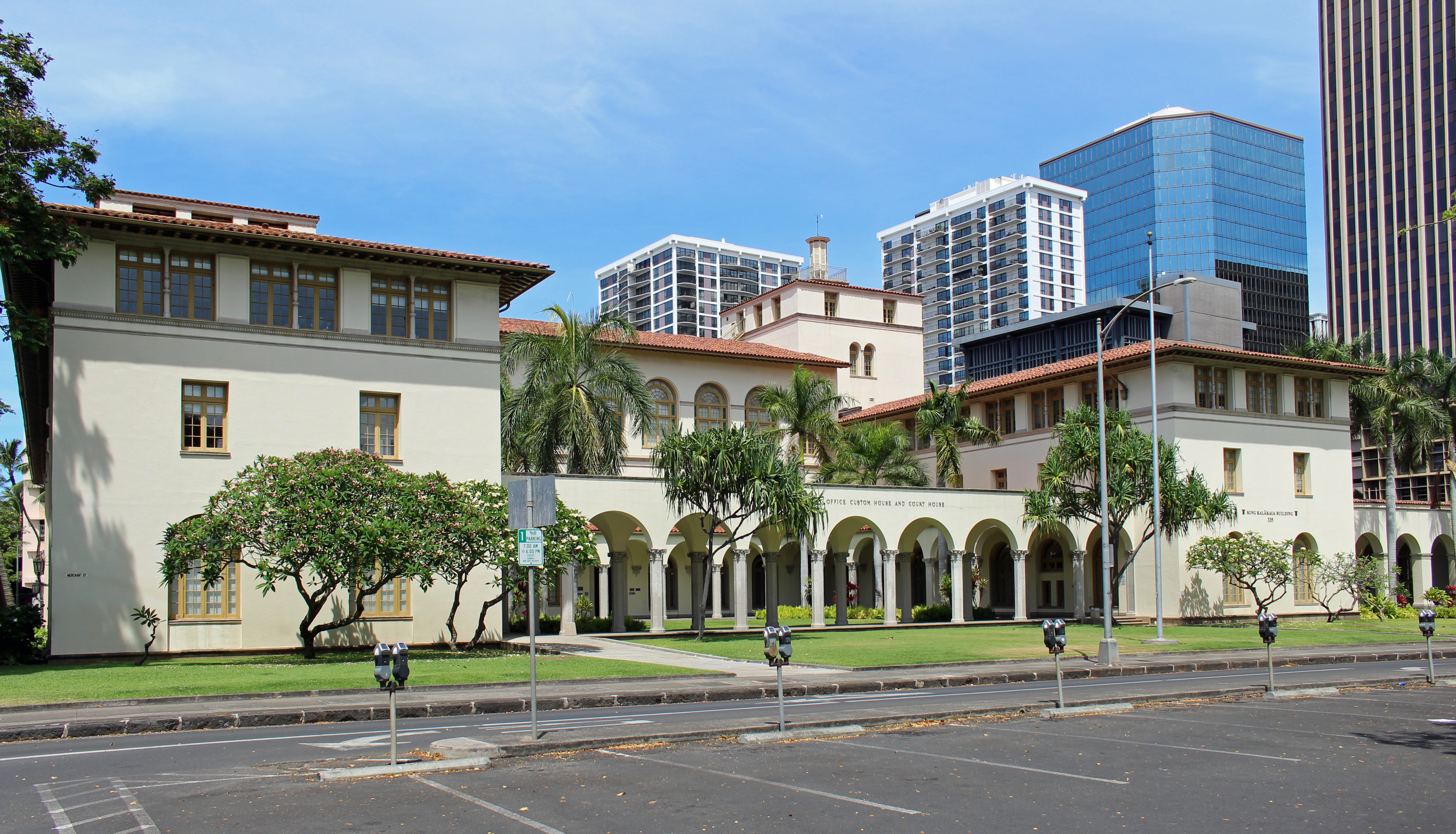
- Building in 2019

- Location within Hawaii
- Location: 335 Merchant Street, Honolulu, Hawaii
- Coordinates: 21°18′22″N 157°51′38″W
- Area: 2.8 acres (1.1 ha)
- Built: 1922
- Architect: York and Sawyer
- Architectural style: Mission/Spanish Revival
- NRHP reference No.: 75000620
- Added to NRHP: January 27, 1975

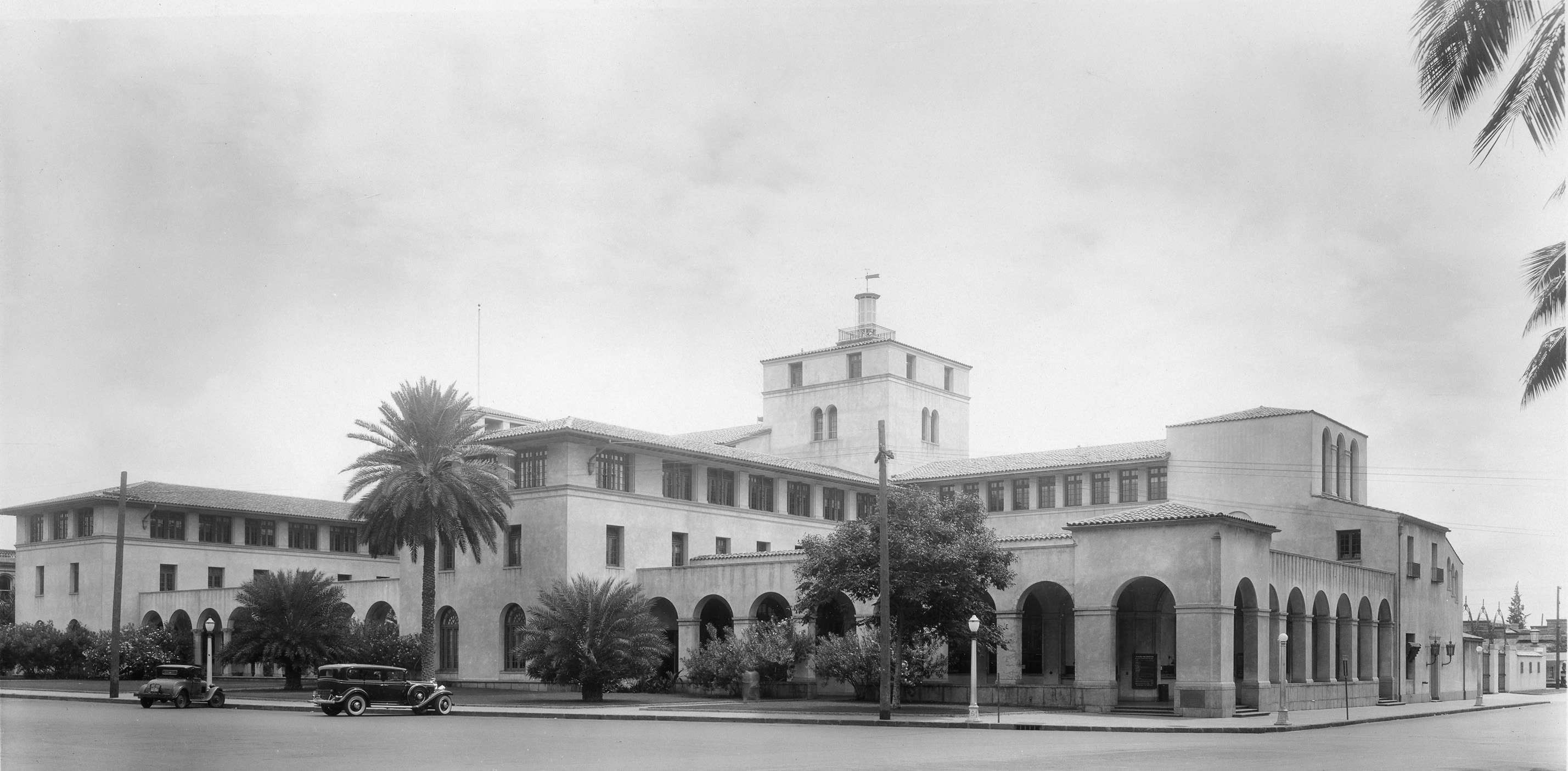
The building as it appeared in 1931

The King David Kalakaua Building in Honolulu, Hawaii is a government building formerly known as the U.S. Post Office, Customhouse, and Courthouse. It was the official seat of administration in the Territory of Hawaii and state of Hawaii for the United States federal government.

== Federal building ==
The building was designed in 1918 and built from 1921 to 1922 in Mission/Spanish Revival architecture. An addition to the building was started in 1929, and opened in 1931. Among other functions, the building held courtrooms and offices for the United States District Court for the District of Hawaii.

It was listed on the National Register of Historic Places (NRHP) on January 27, 1975, under the former name as site 75000620. In 1978 it was also included as a contributing property in the NRHP listing of the Hawaii Capital Historic District.

== State building ==
In December 2003, the federal government sold most of the building to the state of Hawaii for US$32.5 million, upon which the building was renamed in honor of King David Kalākaua — last king of the Hawaiian monarchy. By that point in time, all federal agencies and departments had already moved their Hawaii-based offices years earlier to the Prince Kuhio Federal Building near Honolulu Harbor, except for a small section of the building that is still used as a post office.

Today, the building is home to the offices of the Hawaii Department of Commerce and Consumer Affairs.

== See also ==
- List of United States post offices
