= Hawaii Capital Historic District =

Historic district in Hawaii, United States

- U.S. National Register of Historic Places
- U.S. Historic district
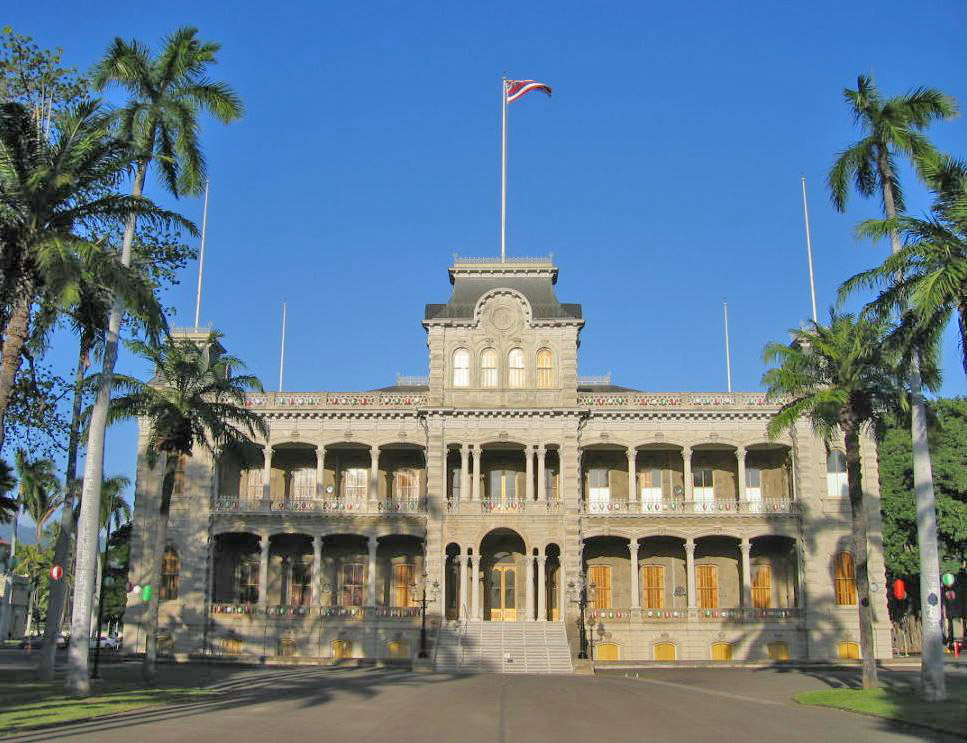
- ʻIolani Palace

- Location within Honolulu Location within Oahu Location within Hawaii
- Location: Beretania, Richards, King, Queen, Punchbowl, and Kawaiahao Sts., Honolulu, Hawaii, U.S.
- Coordinates: 21°18′38″N 157°51′39″W
- Area: 57 acres (23 ha)
- Built: 1820s to 1969
- Architect: Various
- Architectural style: Varied
- NRHP reference No.: 78001020
- Added to NRHP: December 1, 1978

The Hawaii Capital Historic District in Honolulu, Hawaii, has been the center of government of Hawaii since 1845.

== Location ==
With the grounds of Iolani Palace and the Hawaii State Capitol at its core, the historic district reaches inland across Beretania Street to include the buildings and grounds of Washington Place and St. Andrew's Cathedral; crosses Richards Street to include the former Armed Services YMCA Building, YWCA Building, and Hawaiian Electric Company Building; crosses Queen Street on the seaward side to include State Tax Office Building; and reaches across Punchbowl Street to include the buildings and grounds of Kawaiahao Church and Mission Houses below King Street and the city government core of Honolulu Hale and the Mission Memorial Building and Annex above King Street. Its architectural styles range from 19th-century adaptations of New England homes, through the Italianate Renaissance Revival and Neoclassical edifices of the Monarchy, through the Beaux Arts and Mission Revival inspirations of the Territory. The district was added to the National Register of Historic Places on December 1, 1978, after the nearby Chinatown Historic District and Merchant Street Historic District had already been added.

== Contributing properties ==
A total of 20 buildings and structures contribute to the district:

- Hawaii State Capitol (1969) and grounds
- Kawaiahao Church and Mission Houses and grounds, including Lunalilo's Tomb (1876) and Adobe Schoolhouse (1835)
- Washington Place (1846) and grounds
- St. Andrew's Cathedral (1867) and Tenney Hall
- ʻIolani Barracks (1870)
- Aliiolani Hale (1874)
- ʻIolani Palace (1882) and grounds, including the Old Archives Building (1906) and old mausoleum mound (1825)
- ʻIolani Palace Bandstand (1883)
- Kamehameha Statue (1883)
- Kapuaiwa Building (1884)
- Hawaii State Library (1913)
- Honolulu Hale Annex (1916)
- U.S. Post Office, Customhouse, and Courthouse (1921)
- King David Kalakaua Building (1922)
- State Office Building (1926)
- YWCA Building (1927)
- Hawaiian Electric Company Building (1927)
- Armed Services YMCA (1928)
- Honolulu Hale (1929) and grounds
- State Tax Office (1939)
