= YWCA Building (Honolulu) =

- U.S. National Register of Historic Places
- U.S. Historic district – Contributing property
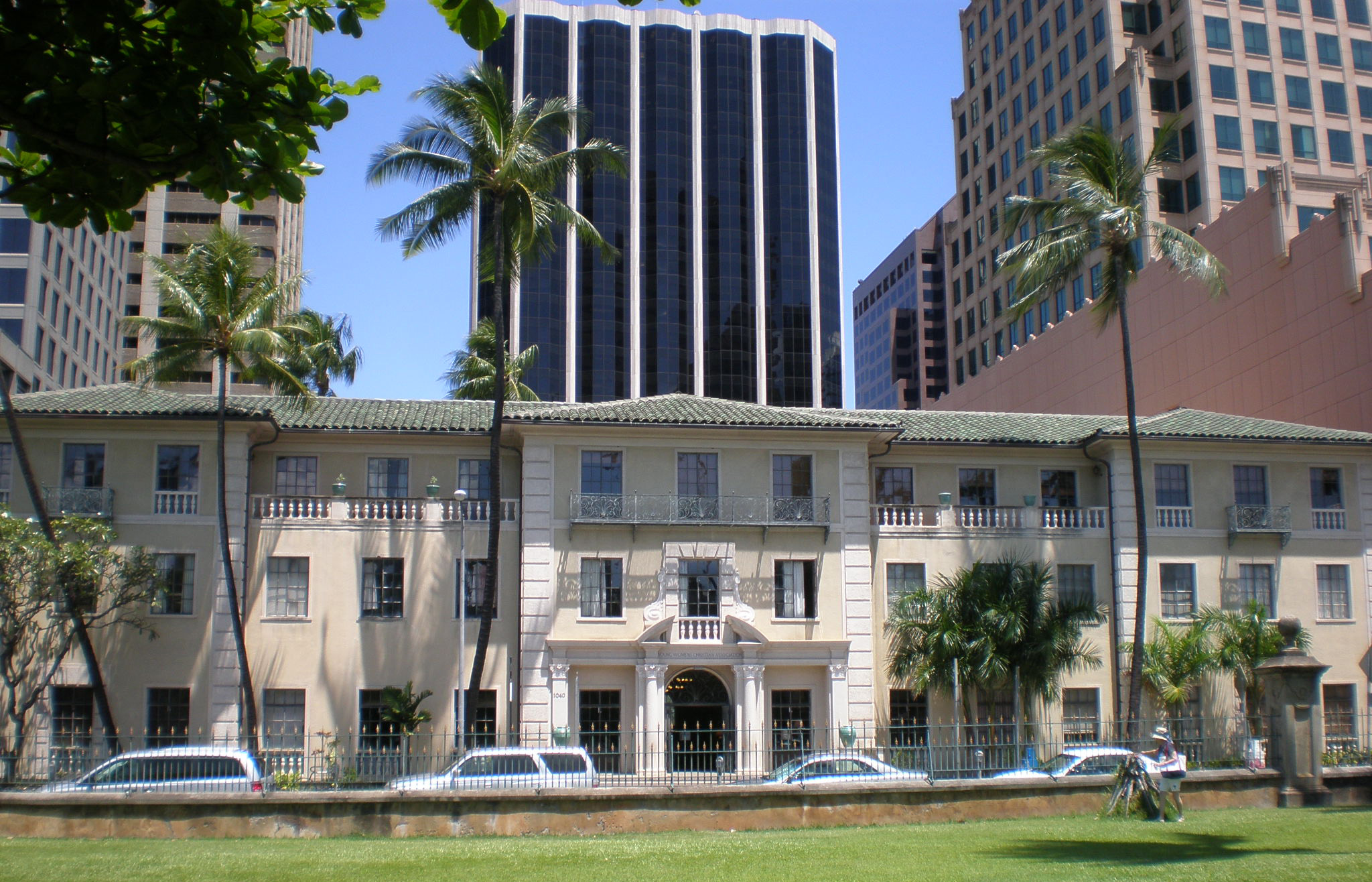
- Front elevation, Richards St.

- Location within Hawaii
- Location: 1040 Richards St., Honolulu, Hawaii, USA
- Coordinates: 21°18′28″N 157°51′35″W
- Built: 1927
- Architect: Julia Morgan
- Architectural style: Beaux-Arts Mediterranean Revival
- Part of: Hawaii Capital Historic District
- NRHP reference No.: 78001020
- Added to NRHP: 1 December 1978

The YWCA Building at 1040 Richards Street, Honolulu, Hawaii, popularly called the Richards Street Y, is now officially named Laniākea, lit. 'immense heaven' in the Hawaiian language. It was designed by San Francisco architect Julia Morgan, who considered it one of her favorites. The building consists of two large units which are connected by a two-story loggia. The main building is three stories high and faces Richards St. with a frontage of 165 feet. The second unit, which is directly in the rear of the first, is somewhat smaller, being two stories high with a large basement.

In the area between the buildings on the mauka side is the spacious swimming pool, 31 by 61 feet. On the makai side of the loggia is a court which can be used for parties and dining.

Entrance from the loggia to the rear building is directly into the Elizabeth Fuller Memorial Hall. Ms. Fuller was a charter member of the Hawaiian Girls Club of the YWCA and one of the oldest members of the organization. She died in India while a member of a Hawaiian group of entertainers. In her memory, the club raised $1,000 toward the hall, which the YWCA named after her.

At the makai end of the rear building is a restaurant, Cafe Julia, named after the architect.

== History ==
YWCA O'ahu formed in 1900 and was housed in several buildings through 1926. Fundraising for the new building began in February 1925. A ten-day campaign was scheduled with the aim of raising $350,000. Their goal was met in a week with $1,350 to spare. Work for the new building began in March 1926. The site for it was a portion of the Laniakea Tract from the Allen Estate on Richards Street, which the YW purchased in 1924 for $238,566.

The women sent their general secretary, Grace Channon, to the Mainland to select an architect for the project. They chose one of America’s first and foremost female architects, Julia Morgan from San Francisco, who built the castle for newspaper baron William Randolph Hearst, to design the building that they were determined would not be an “Architectural misfit”. The Association hired, Catherine Jones Richards to do the landscaping.

The building opened in 1927 and was added to the National Register of Historic Places in 1978 as a contributing property within the Hawaii Capital Historic District.

Julia Morgan, the first female graduate of the École des Beaux Arts in Paris, was also overseeing the restoration of Hearst Castle in San Simeon, California, at the time. She combined modern structural concrete engineering with traditional Mediterranean design elements—arches, loggias, balconies, and decorative grille work—to create a unique building well adapted to the Hawaiian climate and evolving Hawaiian regional style.

== Gallery ==
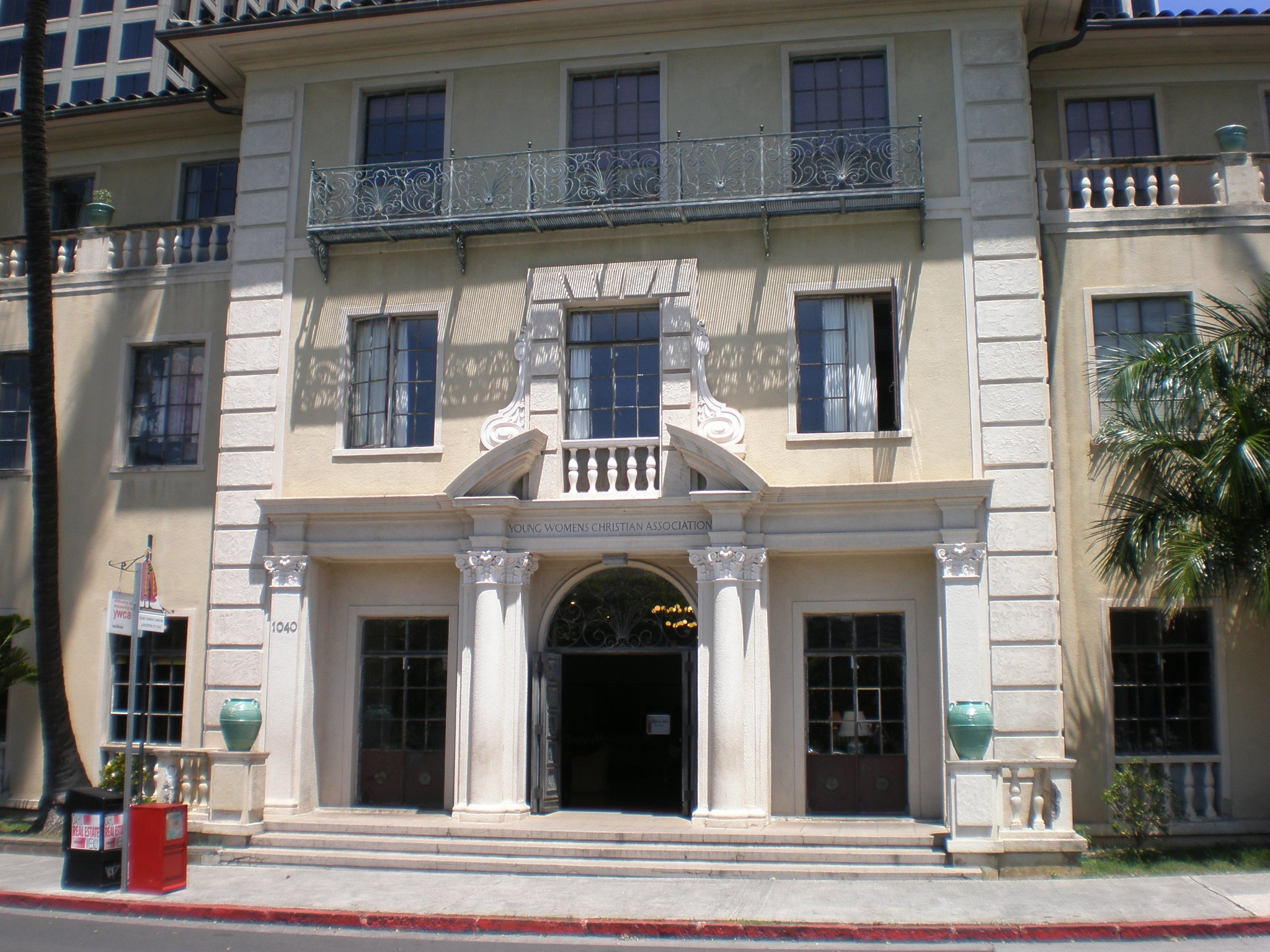
Front entrance

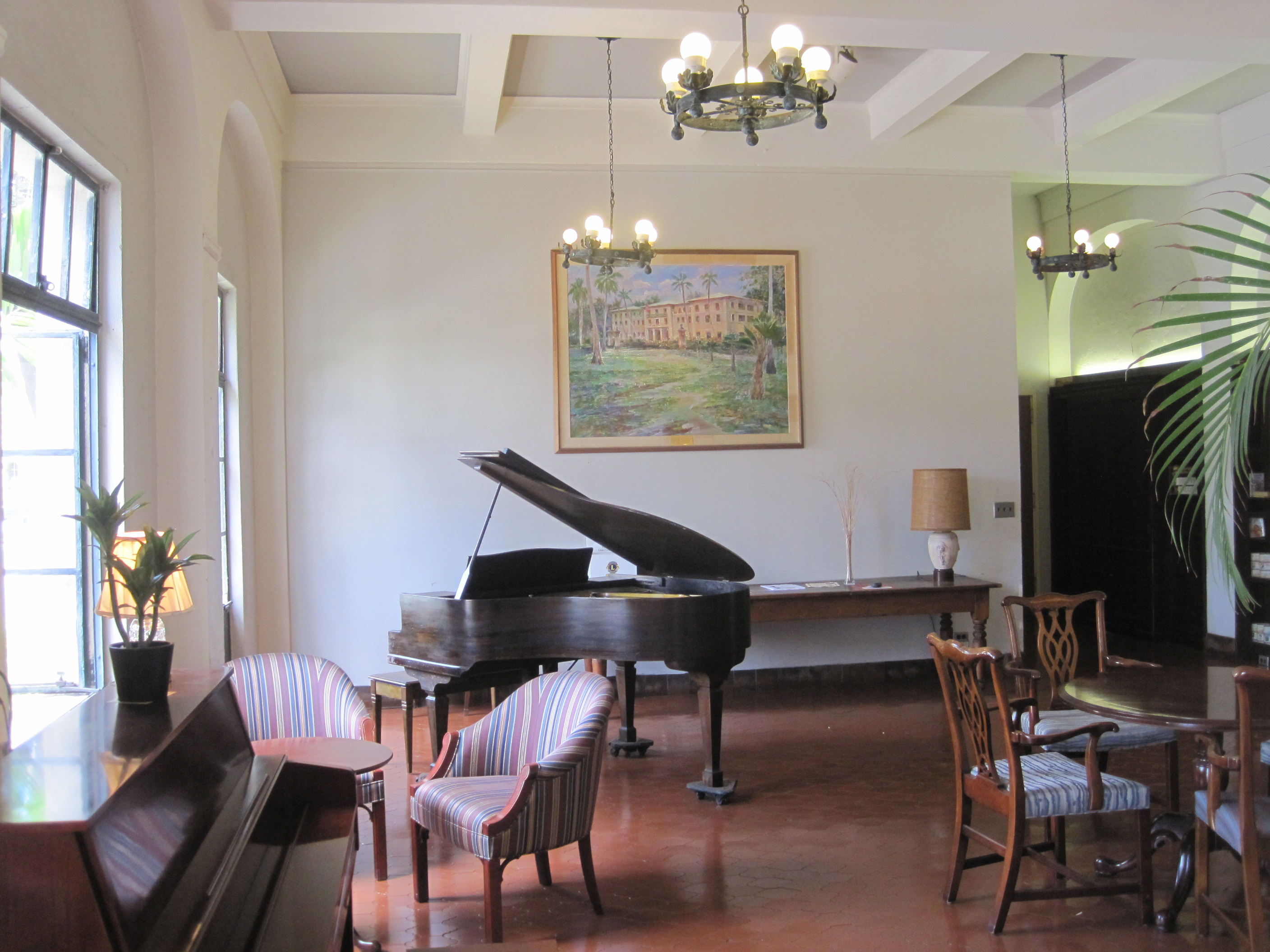
Front lounge

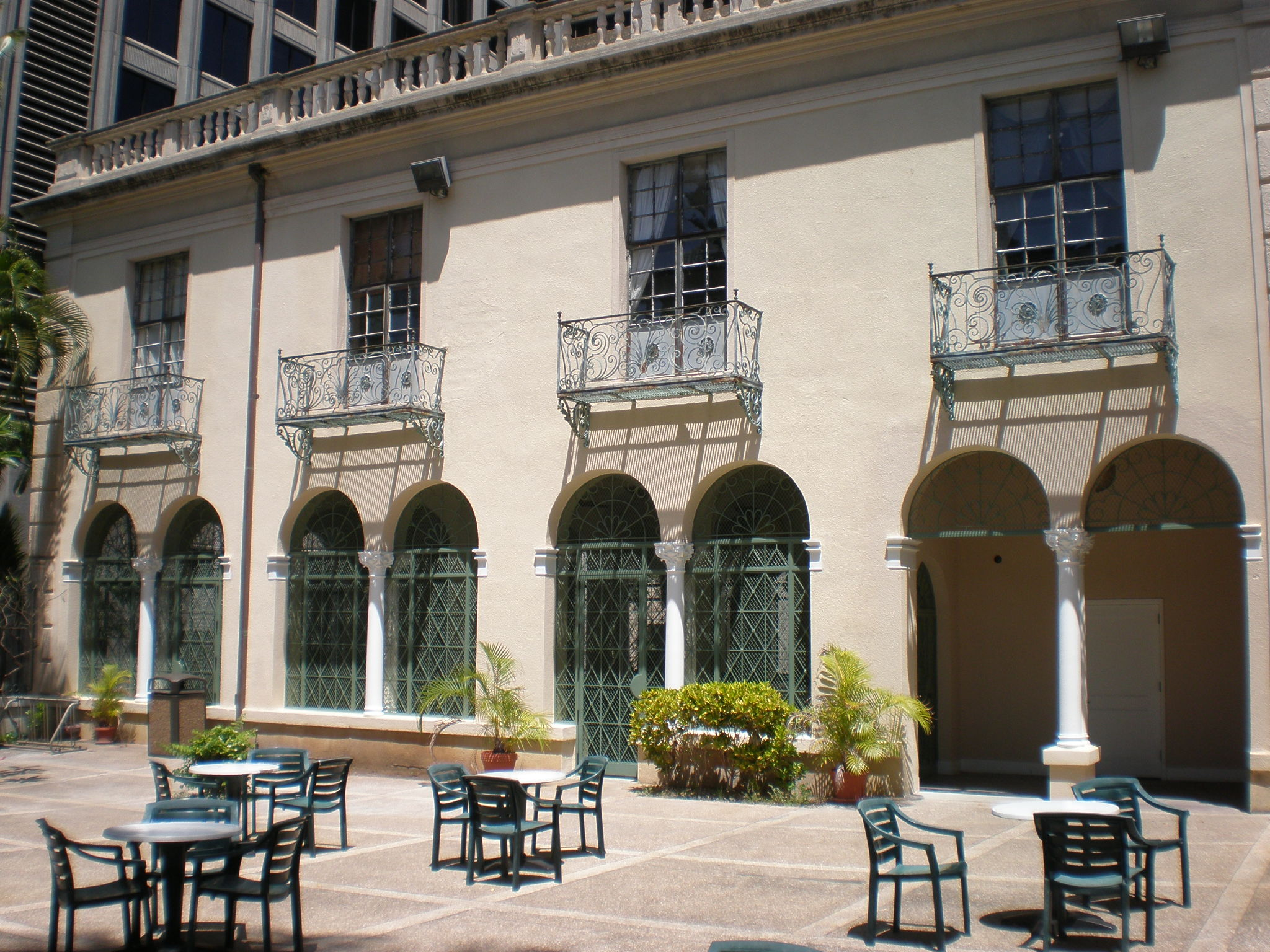
Courtyard

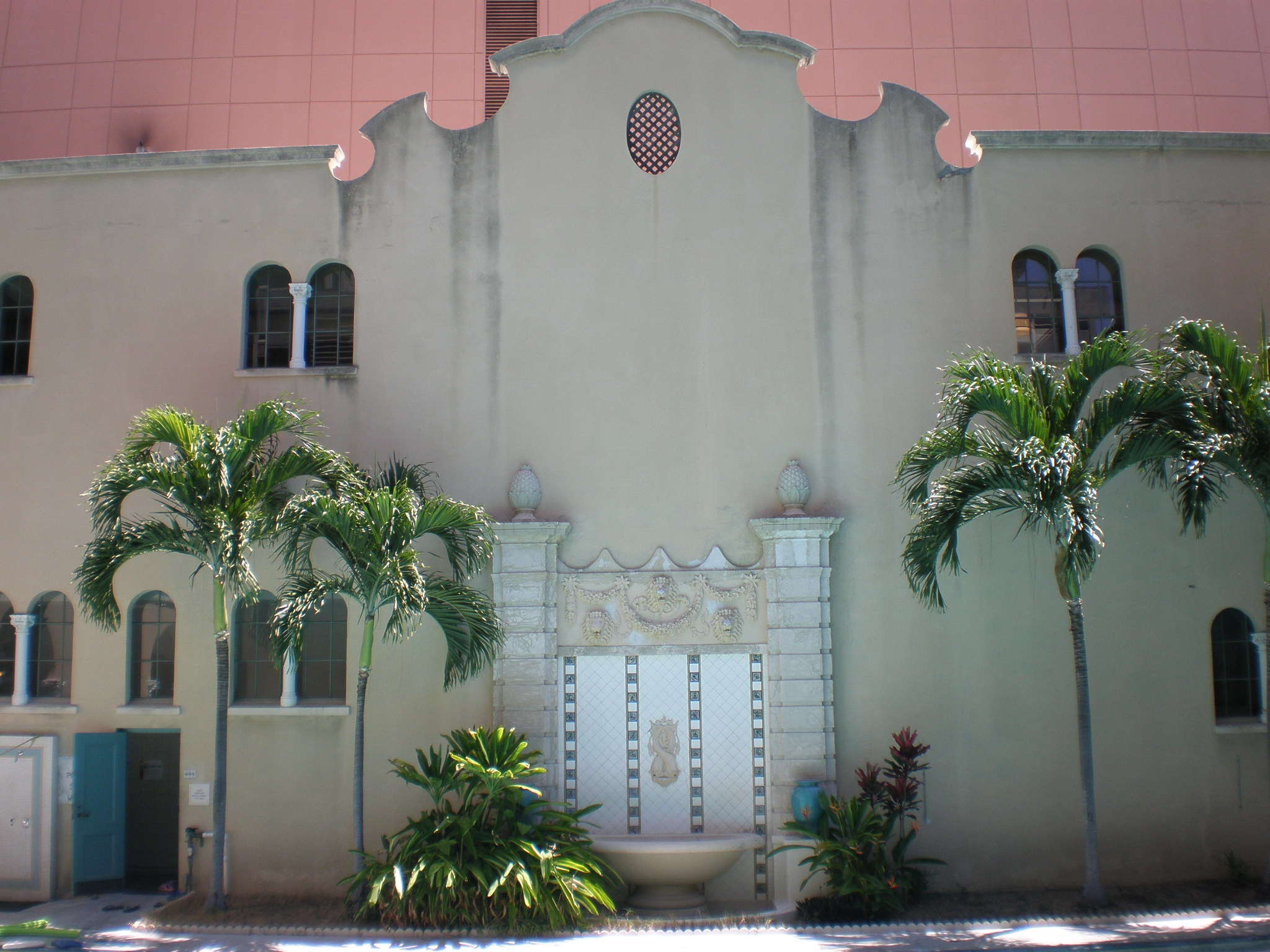
Poolside wall

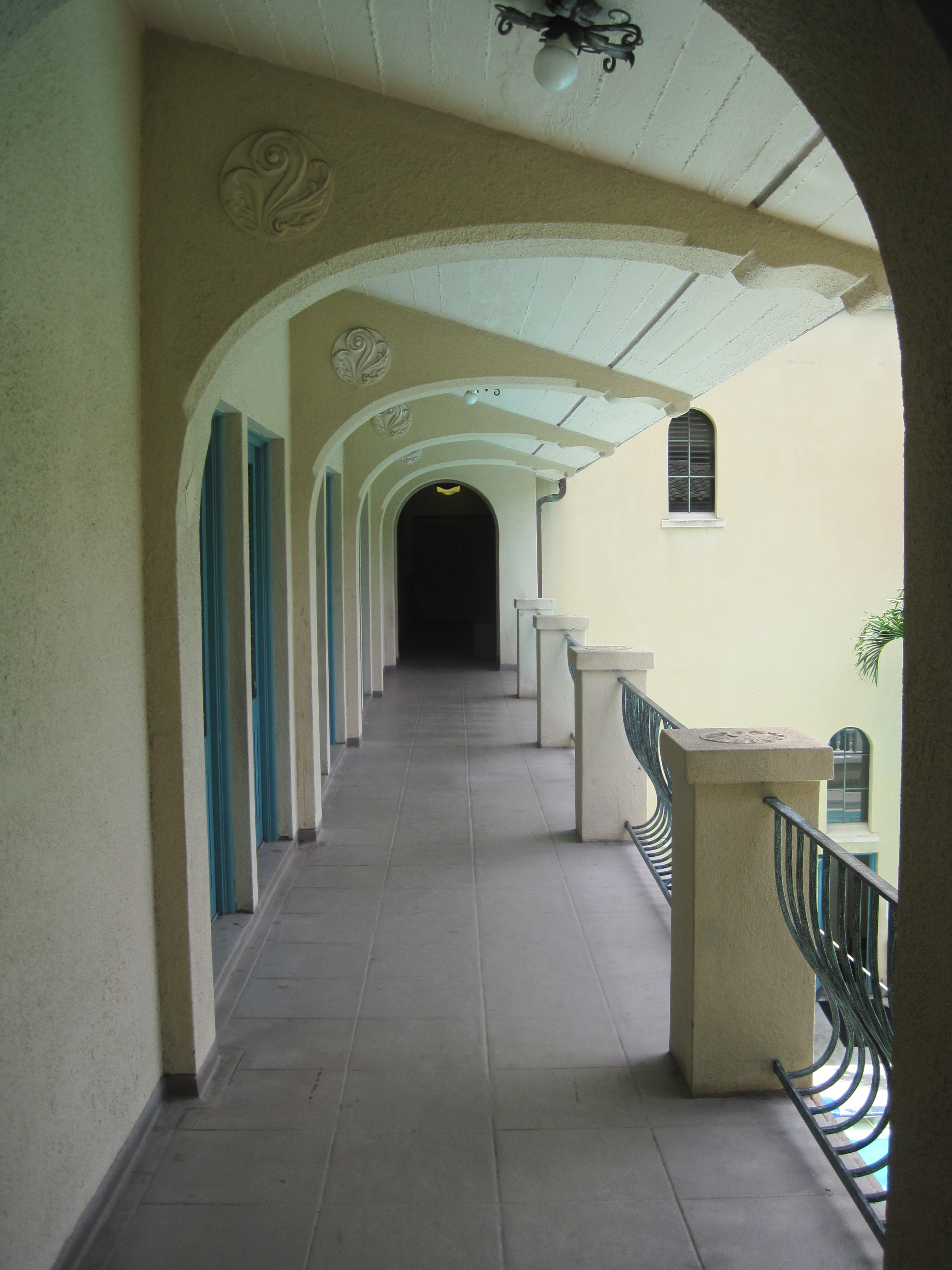
Loggia above pool

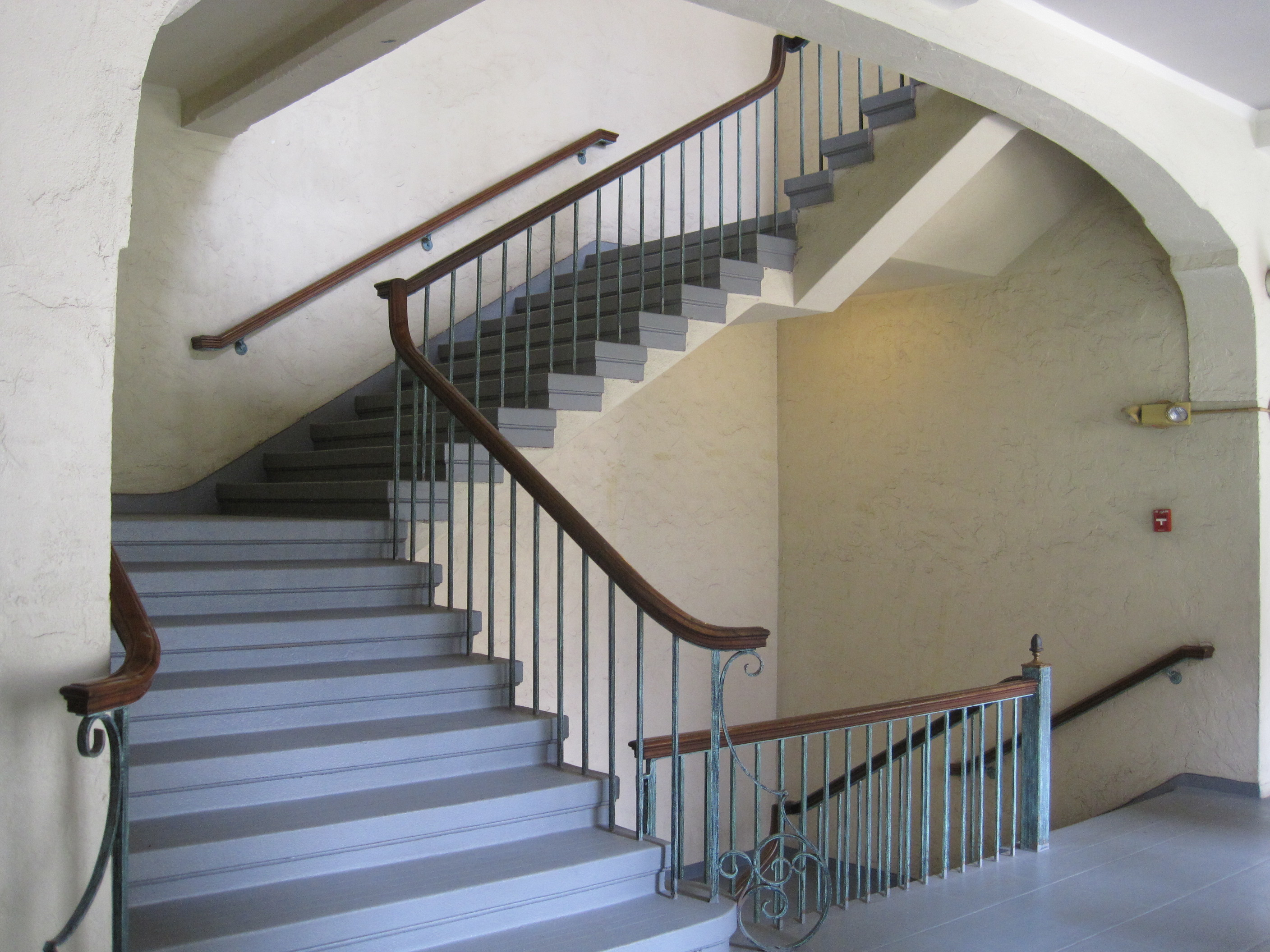
Stairwell

== See also ==
- List of YWCA buildings
- List of works by Julia Morgan
