= Kapuāiwa Building =

- U.S. National Register of Historic Places
- U.S. Historic district – Contributing property
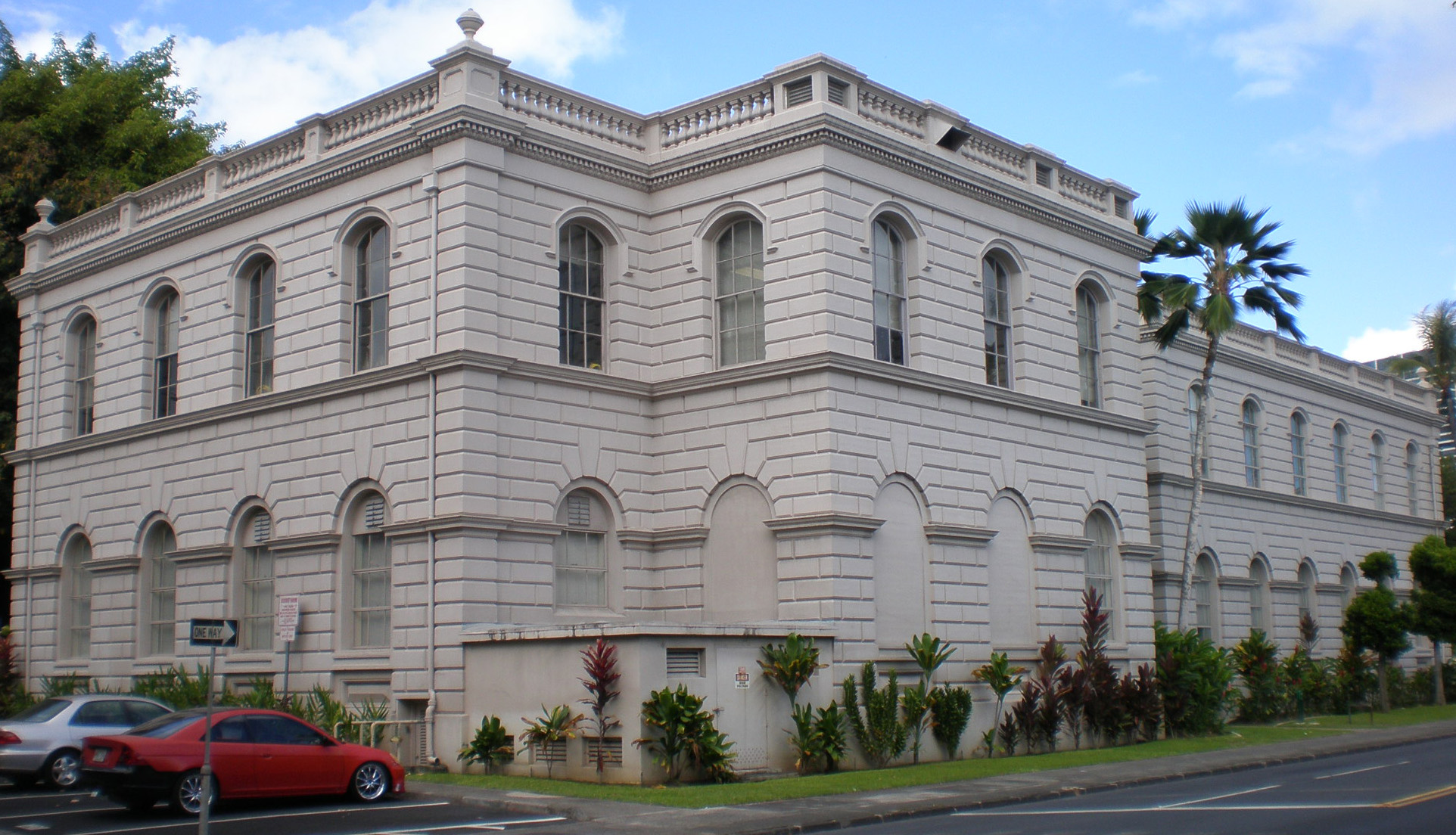
- Oblique view from Queen St.

- Location within Hawaii
- Location: 426 Queen St., Honolulu, Hawaii
- Coordinates: 21°18′34″N 157°51′46″W
- Area: 0.5 acres (0.20 ha)
- Built: 1884
- Architect: George Lucas
- Architectural style: Italianate Renaissance revival
- Part of: Hawaii Capital Historic District (ID78001020)
- NRHP reference No.: 73000660
- Added to NRHP: July 2, 1973

The Kapuāiwa Building at 426 Queen Street in the Capital Historic District of Honolulu, Hawaii, was built in 1884, during the reign of Kalākaua, originally to provide fireproof safekeeping for government documents. It was named for Lot Kapuāiwa, who had reigned as Kamehameha V, and its architect, George Lucas, employed an Italianate Renaissance revival style that matched that of the other Hawaiian Monarchy buildings of that period. It was added to the National Register of Historic Places on 2 July 1973.

Built of rusticated concrete blocks, it is two stories high, with a flat roof and a recessed central entrance on the Queen Street side. The arched windows have keystones on the ground floor and dripstones on the upper level, and the roofline is decorated with a cornice and balustrade. In 1930, a new wing and entry corridor were added and the interior was renovated.
