= Aliʻiōlani Hale =

- U.S. National Register of Historic Places
- U.S. Historic district – Contributing property
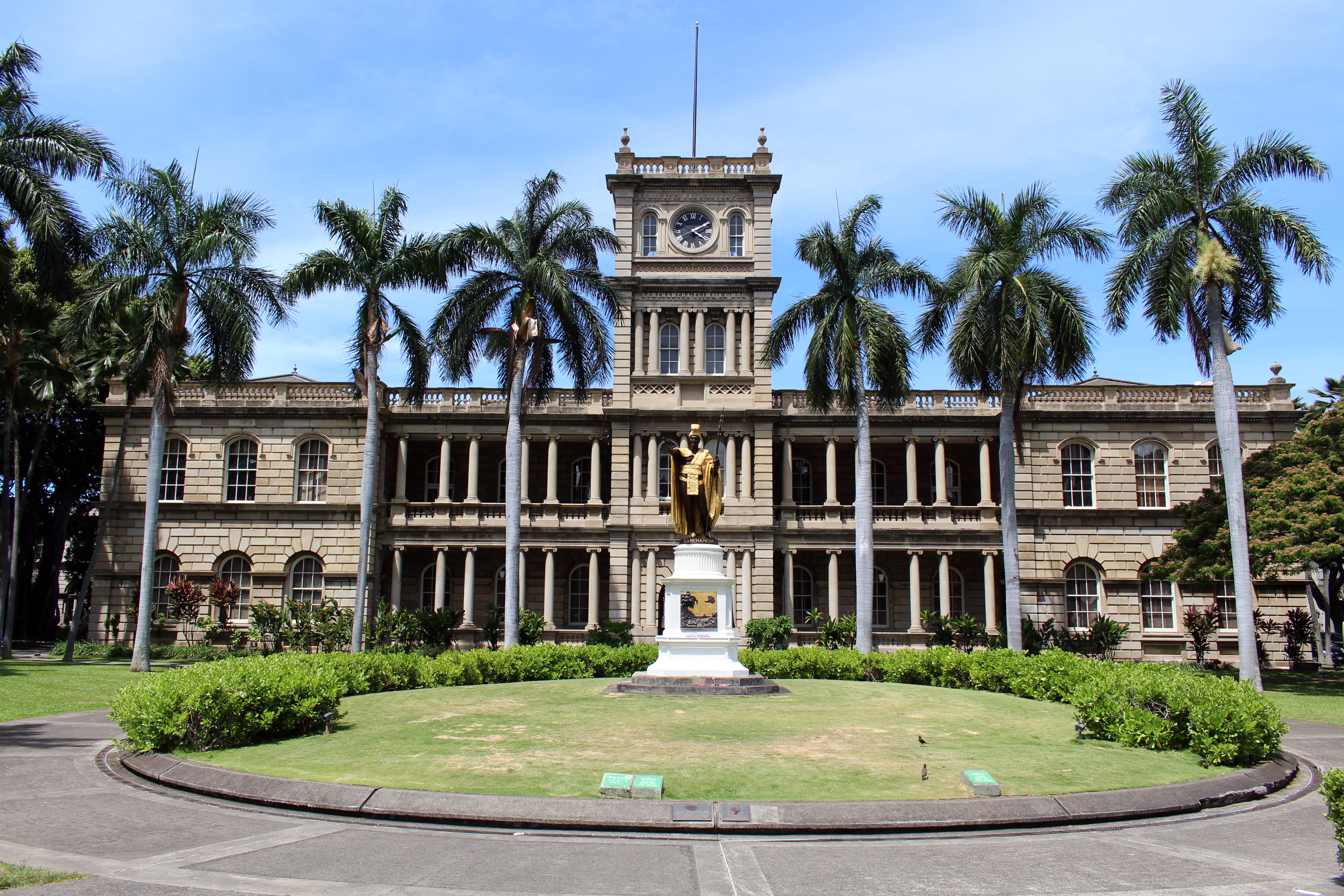
- Aliʻiōlani Hale is today the home of the Hawaiʻi State Supreme Court and the statue of Kamehameha the Great.

- Location within Hawaii
- Location: 417 King Street, Honolulu, Hawaii
- Coordinates: 21°18′19″N 157°51′36″W
- Built: 1871–1874
- Architect: Thomas Rowe, Robert Stirling
- Architectural style: Italian Renaissance Revival
- Part of: Hawaii Capital Historic District (ID78001020)
- NRHP reference No.: 72000414
- Added to NRHP: February 2, 1972

Aliʻiōlani Hale is a building located in downtown Honolulu, Hawaiʻi, currently used as the home of the Hawaiʻi State Supreme Court. It is the former seat of government of the Kingdom of Hawaiʻi and the Republic of Hawaiʻi.

Located in the building's courtyard is the famed gold-leaf statue of Kamehameha the Great.

== Design and history ==
The Aliʻiōlani Hale was designed by Australian Thomas Rowe in an Italian Renaissance Revival as the royal palace for King Kamehameha V. In the Hawaiian language, Aliʻiōlani Hale means "House of Heavenly Kings". The name "Aliʻiōlani" was also one of the given names of Kamehameha V.

Although the building was designed to be a palace, Kamehameha V realized that the Hawaiian government desperately needed a government building. At that time, the several buildings in Honolulu used by the government were very small and cramped, clearly inadequate for the growing Hawaiian government. Thus, when Kamehameha V ordered construction of Aliʻiōlani Hale, he commissioned it as a government office building instead of a palace.

Kamehameha V laid the cornerstone for the building on February 19, 1872. He died before the building was completed, and it was dedicated in 1874 by one of his successors, King David Kalākaua. At the time, Hawaiian media criticized the building's extravagant design, suggesting that the building be converted into a palace as originally designed.

Until 1893, the building held most of the executive departments of the Hawaiian government as well as the Hawaiian legislature and courts.

== Overthrow of the Hawaiian monarchy ==
It was from Aliʻiōlani Hale in 1893 that the Committee of Safety, under the leadership of Lorrin A. Thurston, deposed Queen Liliʻuokalani by public proclamation.

After the establishment of the Hawaiian provisional government in 1893 and the Republic of Hawaiʻi in 1894, some of the offices in Aliʻiōlani Hale were moved to ʻIolani Palace, including the Hawaiian legislature. As a result, Aliʻiolani Hale became primarily a judicial building.

== Since 1900 ==
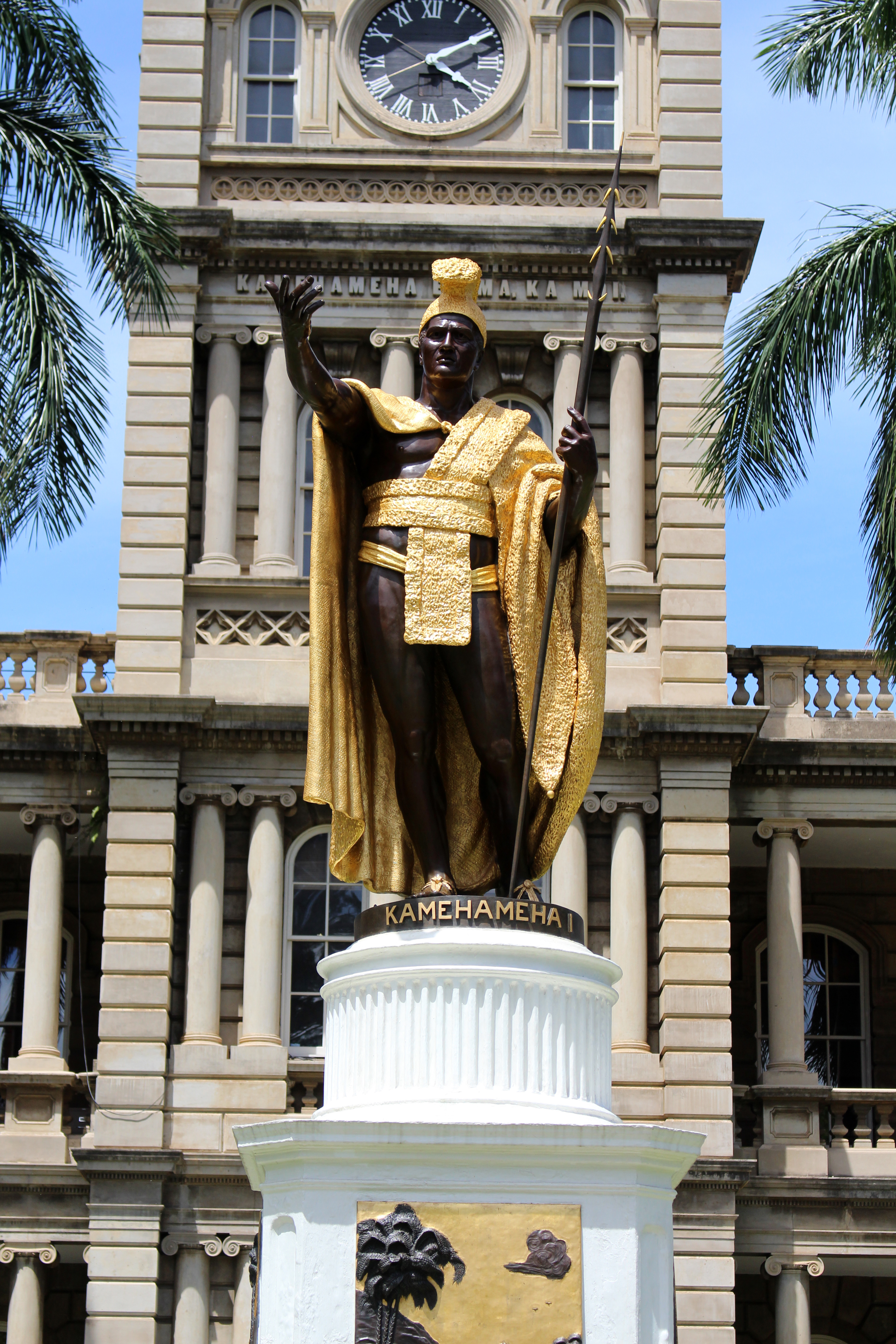
Kamehameha Statue

The growing size of Hawaiʻi's government continued to be a problem for the building, especially after Hawaiʻi became a United States territory in 1900. In 1911, the building was extensively renovated to help solve these space problems. The entire interior of the building was gutted and rebuilt, giving the building's interior a completely new floorplan. Since the building was originally designed to be a palace, its floorplan was not adequate for its later usage as a judicial building. The new layout of the building fixed this problem.

The size of the territorial government continued to grow. In the 1940s, a new wing was added to the building to help alleviate the growing problem of overcrowding. The architects who designed the new wing tried to blend it in with the original building that dated back to the 1870s.

Over the next many decades, most of the state judiciary functions moved out of Aliʻiōlani Hale to various other buildings around Honolulu (including the state district, family, and circuit courts). Today, the building houses the Hawaiʻi State Supreme Court and is the administrative center of the Hawaiʻi State Judiciary. It also houses the Judiciary History Center, a museum featuring a multimedia presentation of Hawaiʻi's judiciary, a restored historic courtroom, and other exhibits dealing with Hawaiʻi's judicial history. The building also houses Hawaiʻi's largest law library.

In December 2005, a capsule buried by Kamehameha V when he laid the cornerstone was located, at the direction of the Joint POW/MIA Accounting Command, by Professor Larry Connors of the University of Denver using ground penetrating radar. The capsule contained photos of royal families and the constitution of the Hawaiian Kingdom, Hawaiian postage stamps, Hawaiian and foreign coinage, newspapers, a calendar and books. The capsule was located to protect it during future renovations, and not retrieved due to concerns of damaging the structure of the building itself.

Copper thieves stripped several copper downspouts from the building in 2006.

In the 2010 version of CBS' Hawaii Five-0 TV series, Aliʻiōlani Hale is depicted as the Iolani Palace; headquarters for the Five-0 task force with exterior shots of the building being used frequently throughout the series.

Aliʻiōlani Hale is one of many buildings in downtown Honolulu listed on the National Register of Historic Places. Within walking distance are the Cathedral of Our Lady of Peace, Hawaiʻi State Capitol, Hawaiʻi State Library, Honolulu Hale, ʻIolani Palace, Kawaiahaʻo Church, Territorial Building, and Washington Place.

== King Kamehameha V Judiciary History Center ==
The King Kamehameha V Judiciary History Center, located in Aliʻiōlani Hale, focuses on Hawaii's legal history and landmark court cases. Admission is free and the public can tour the exhibits from Monday through Friday from 8am to 4pm. Group tours are offered by reservation.

== See also ==
- National Register of Historic Places listings in Oʻahu
- History of Hawaiʻi
