= Hawaii State Capitol =

Capitol building of the U.S. state of Hawaii

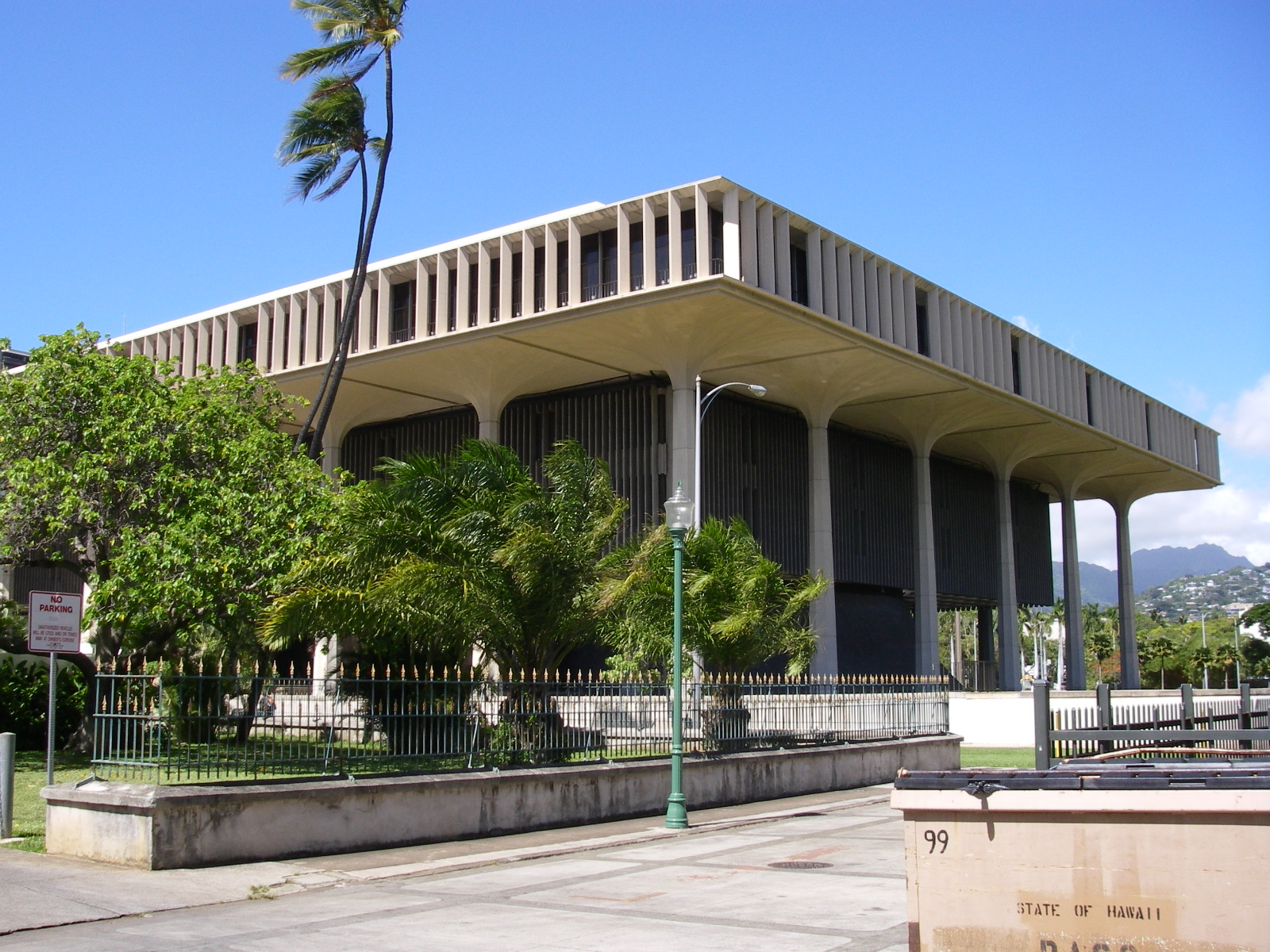
- The Hawaii State Capitol from the southeast
- Interactive map of the Hawaii State Capitol area

General information
- Architectural style: Hawaiian international architecture
- Location: 415 S. Beretania Street Honolulu, Hawaii
- Coordinates: 21°18′27″N 157°51′27″W
- Construction started: November 10, 1965; 60 years ago
- Completed: March 15, 1969; 57 years ago
- Client: State of Hawaii
- Owner: State of Hawaii

Design and construction
- Architects: Belt, Lemmon & Lo and John Carl Warnecke & Associates

Website
- www.capitol.hawaii.gov
- Hawaii State Capitol & Grounds
- U.S. Historic district – Contributing property
- Part of: Hawaii Capital Historic District (ID78001020)
- Designated CP: 12/01/1978

The Hawaii State Capitol is the official statehouse or capitol building of the U.S. state of Hawaii. From its chambers, the executive and legislative branches perform the duties involved in governing the state. The Hawaii State Legislature—composed of the twenty-five member Hawaii State Senate led by the President of the Senate and the fifty-one member Hawaii State House of Representatives led by the Speaker of the House—convenes in the building. Its principal tenants are the governor and lieutenant governor of Hawaii, as well as all legislative offices and the Legislative Reference Bureau.

Located in downtown Honolulu, the Hawaii State Capitol was commissioned and dedicated by John A. Burns, second governor of Hawaii. It opened on March 15, 1969, replacing the former statehouse, the ʻIolani Palace.

== Monuments ==
Burns designed the restoration of the royal palace built by King David Kalākaua and Queen Kapiʻolani; as part of that effort, the Queen Liliʻuokalani Statue in the Capitol Mall between the capitol building and ʻIolani Palace was dedicated on April 10, 1982. The site was once Haimoeipo, the royal residence of Queen Dowager Kalama and later King Lunalilo, who died there.

Several other capitol building monuments decorate the statehouse grounds. The Beretania Street entrance features the Liberty Bell, a gift of the President of the United States and the United States Congress to the Territory of Hawaii in 1950 as a symbol of freedom and democracy. One of the more prominent monuments on the statehouse grounds is the Father Damien Statue—a tribute to the Roman Catholic priest who died in 1869 after sixteen years of serving patients afflicted with leprosy. Father Damien was beatified by Pope John Paul II in 1995, and canonized on October 11, 2009, by Pope Benedict XVI. His feast Day is celebrated on May 10. In Hawaiʻi, it is celebrated on the day of his death, April 15.

The Eternal Flame on Beretania Street is a metal sculptured torch that burns endlessly as a tribute to all men and women from Hawaii who served with the Air Force, Army, Coast Guard, Marines, and Navy in the major and minor conflicts in which the United States was engaged. Likewise, the Korean-Vietnam War Memorial pays tribute to service members who died in those conflicts. Dedicated on July 24, 1994, by Benjamin J. Cayetano, fifth Governor of Hawaii, the monument consists of 768 black marble pedestals engraved with the names of 312 service members of the Vietnam War. A larger marble slab bears a Hawaiian language inscription of remembrance.

== Architecture ==
The Hawaii State Capitol is an American adaptation of the Bauhaus style termed "Hawaiian international architecture". It was designed by a partnership between the firms of Belt, Lemon and Lo (Architects Hawaii Ltd.), and John Carl Warnecke and Associates. Unlike other state capitols modeled after the United States Capitol, the Hawaii State Capitol's distinct architectural features symbolize various natural aspects of Hawaii. Among them:

- The building is surrounded by a reflecting pool, symbolizing the Pacific Ocean.
- The two legislative chambers are cone-shaped, symbolizing volcanoes that formed the Hawaiian Islands.
- The columns around the perimeter of the building have shapes resembling royal palm trees. There are eight columns in four rows at either side of the building, representing the eight main islands of Hawaii; sets of eight items appear in other places inside and along the outside of the building.
- The Capitol is built with an open-air design, allowing sun, wind, and rain to enter; the central atrium opens to the sky and rainbows can sometimes be seen inside the building when it rains.
- Four kukui nut trees (Hawaii's state tree) are a numerical reference to the four main counties in the State of Hawaii and the four major Hawaiian gods (Kukailimoku, Kane, Lono, and Kanaloa). Sets of four items appear in many other places in the building.
- When standing in the center of the structure, the chandeliers from both legislative chambers, which represent the sun and moon, can be seen through the glass walls, while the area that is normally reserved for a rotunda in most capitol buildings is left open to the sky. It is said that the sky is Hawaii's capitol dome.
- German-American artist Otto Piene designed the chandeliers, which are kinetic sculptures made of small objects. The Sun chandelier in the House is made of dozens of gold-plated globes, and the Moon chandelier in the Senate is made of 620 white chambered nautilus shells.
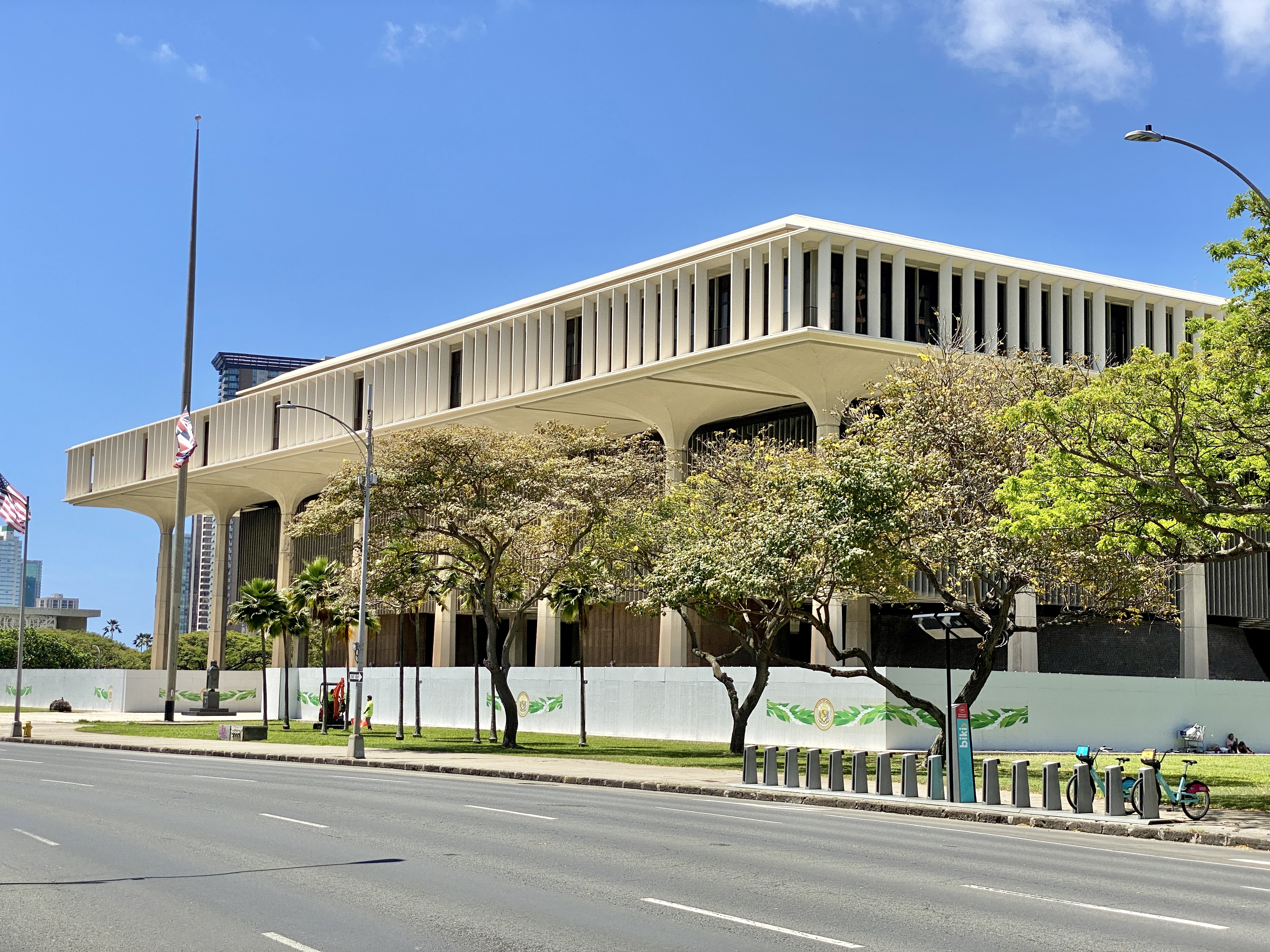
The Hawaii State Capitol is on Beretania Street.

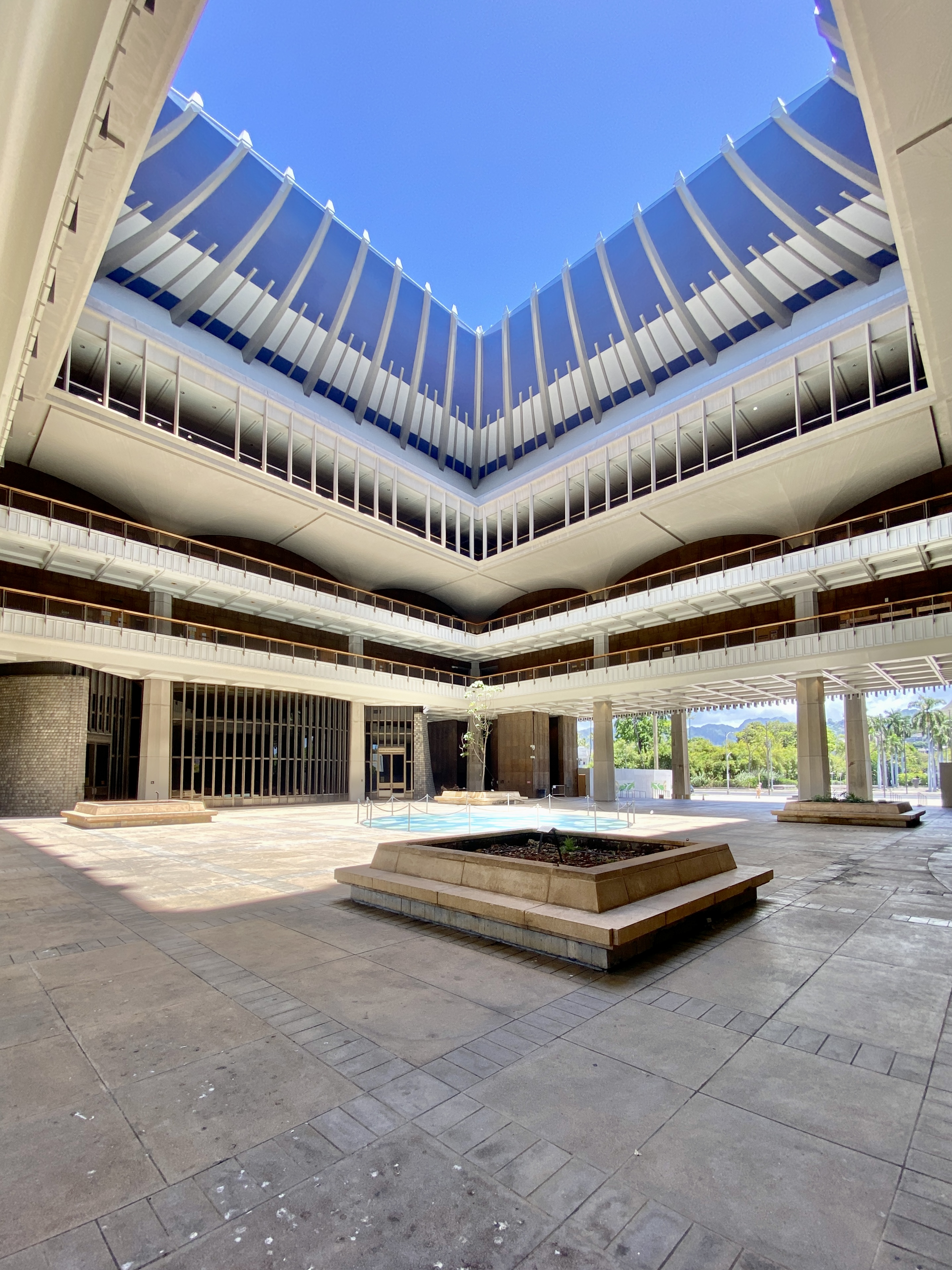
The central atrium

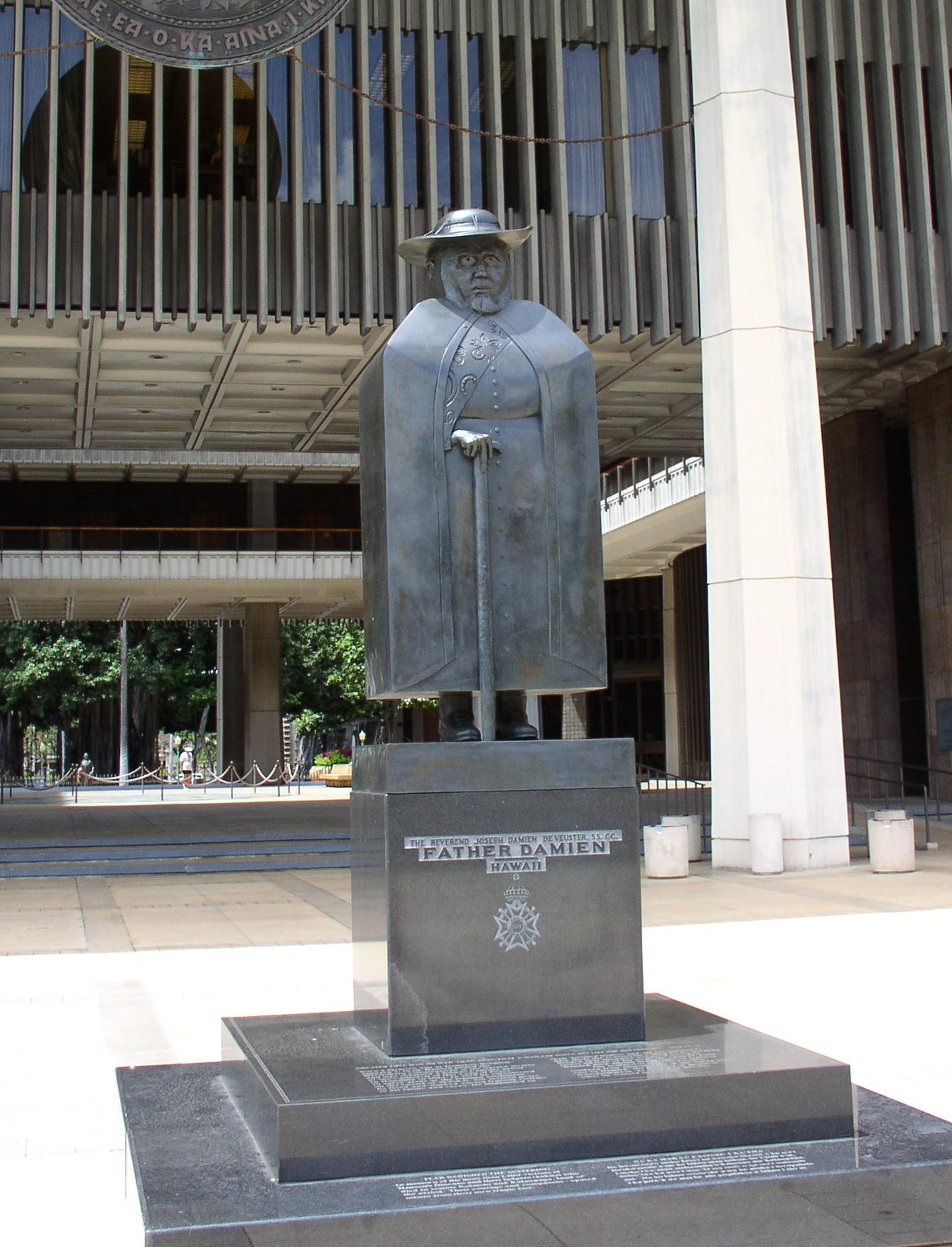
Statue of Father Damien outside the Hawaii State Capitol Building

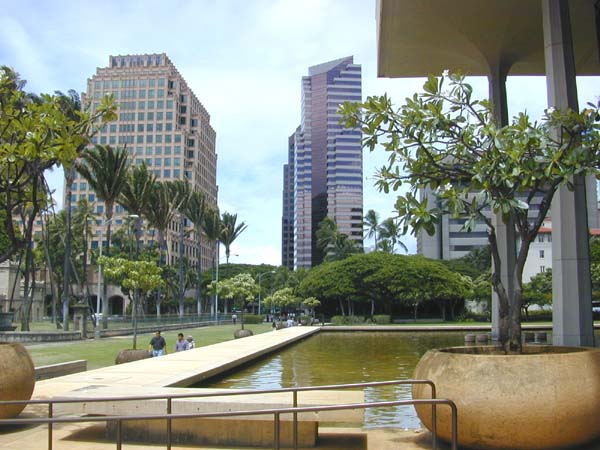
Reflecting pool

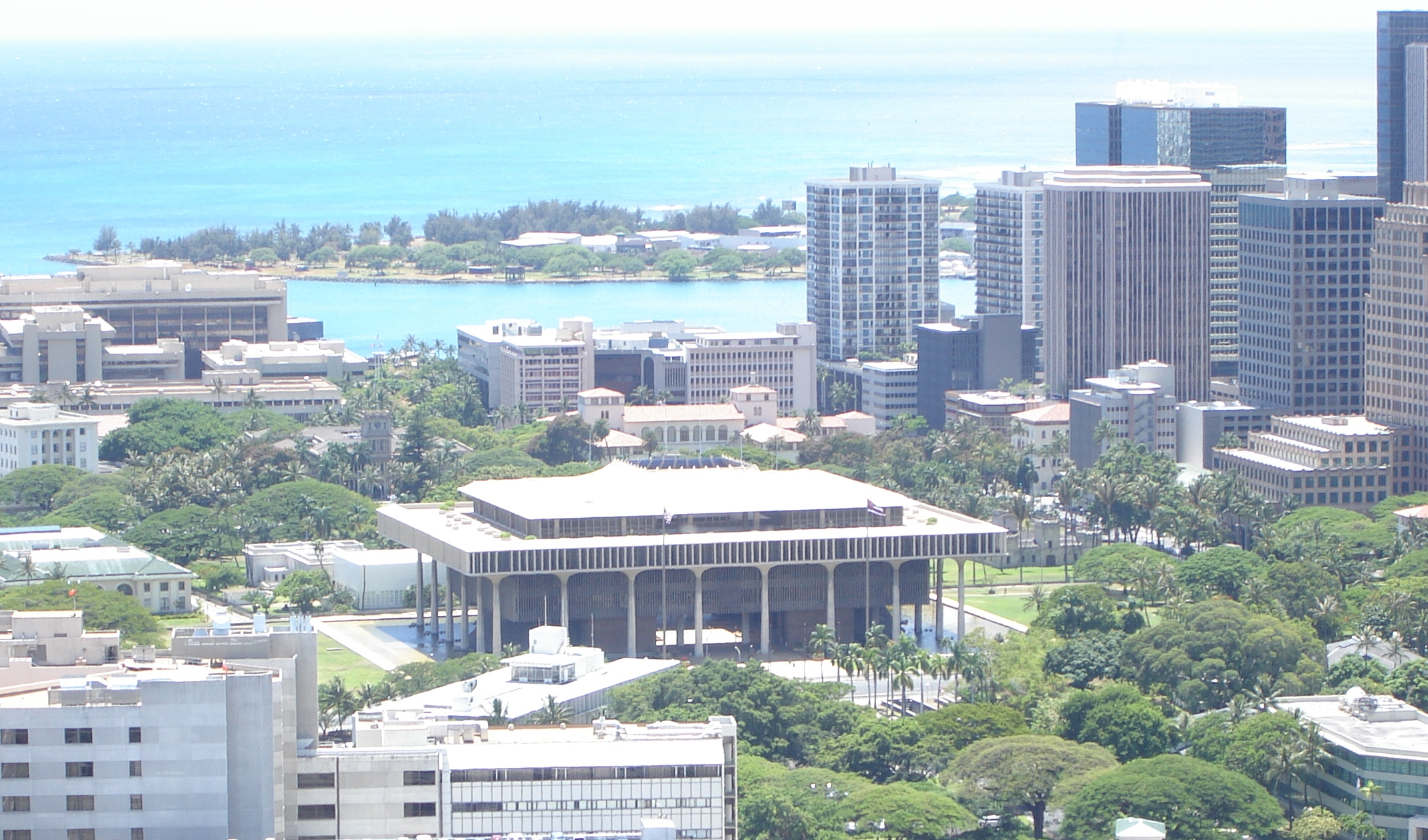
Hawaii State Capitol photographed from the rim of Punchbowl Crater

=== Reflecting pool algae issue ===
From the time the Capitol was completed in 1969, the reflecting pool has had a persistent algae growth problem, due partly to the fact the pool is fed with brackish water from on-site wells. Attempts by the state to fix the problem included introducing tilapia fish into the pool and installing an ozone treatment system. The state currently has the pool lining scrubbed manually with enzymes added to the water to combat growth. Since 2020 the building has been surrounded by plywood and the building's surrounding pool is empty. Some Capitol regulars say the algae growth has come to represent the pollution of the Pacific Ocean, in an ironic twist of the original symbolic meaning of the pool.

== See also ==
- List of Hawaii state legislatures
- List of state and territorial capitols in the United States
