= Don Graham (developer) =

American real estate developer

- Born: June 14, 1914; Oakland, California
- Died: August 17, 2010 (aged 96); Honolulu, Hawaii
- Occupation(s): Real estate developer and businessman
- Years active: 1945–2010
- Known for: The developer and contractor of the Ala Moana Center in Honolulu.
- Notable work: "La Ronde" the first revolving restaurant in the U.S.

Donald Houston Graham Jr. (June 14, 1914 – August 17, 2010) was an American real estate developer and businessman credited with transforming the urban landscape of Hawaii by building condos, resorts, hotel, residences and shopping centers. He developed and constructed the Ala Moana Center in Ala Moana, which opened in 1959 and remains the largest outdoor shopping mall in the United States.

== Biography ==
=== Early life ===
Graham was born on June 14, 1914, in Oakland, California. He received a bachelor's degree from the University of California, Berkeley and began his career as a bond trader.

He enlisted in the United States Army during World War II, serving in an amphibious unit. He received two Bronze Star Medals for service at two major battles in the Philippines: the Battle of Leyte and the Invasion of Lingayen Gulf. He was in Tokyo during the Surrender of Japan.

=== Career ===
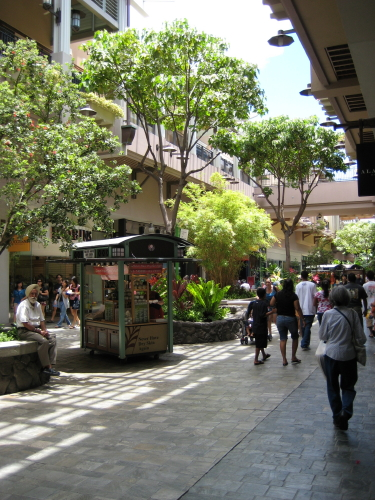
Interior of the Ala Moana Center

Graham settled permanently in Hawaii after World War II. He was hired in late 1945 by Dillingham Corp, founded by Walter F. Dillingham. Graham soon became the president Hawaiian Land Corp, a Dillingham subsidiary.

Graham developed and completed a series of major projects throughout Honolulu for Dilligham, including the Ala Moana Hotel and the Ala Moana office building (including "La Ronde", first revolving restaurant in the United States).

He was best known as the developer and contractor of the Ala Moana Center, which opened in 1959. It was constructed on what was originally swamp land. It was filled by coral rock from a dredging project initiated by Walter F. Dillingham. Dillingham's son, Lowell Dillingham, announced the project in 1948 and broke ground in 1957. Critics at the time regarded the shopping center as a potential failure due to its layout and design, which oriented the mall away from the Pacific Ocean. Graham, the Ala Moana Center's chief designer, also designed the building with two levels for retail stores and parking, an unusual layout in the 1950s. After the mall's completion, he became its first general manager.

Graham's project was a huge success, with major implications for shoppers in Honolulu and beyond. The Center shifted the focus of retail in Oahu from downtown Honolulu to the new mall. It has been expanded since its opening to become the largest mall in the United States for decades. Today, it is one of the three highest-grossing malls in the United States and the largest outdoor shopping mall in the country.

Graham remained at the Dillingham Corp for more than 27 years before leaving and creating new development firms with other business partners. The firms included Mainline Associates, Graham Wong Hastings and Graham Murata Russell, now known as GMR LLC. Graham designed and developed numerous other projects throughout Hawaii, including the Coconut Beach Hotel in Kauai, the Maui Marriott Resort in Kaanapali, the Wailupe Peninsula subdivision in East Honolulu and the Discovery Bay condominium in Waikiki. He also partnered to develop the Liliha Square Shopping Center, which was sold in the late 1990s to Finance Factors.

During his later career, he also focused on the creation of affordable housing projects and developments.

Graham remained active in GMR LLC until two weeks before his death in 2010. He was admitted to Straub Medical Center on August 15, 2010, where he was diagnosed with pneumonia and leukemia. He died on August 17, 2010, in Honolulu at the age of 96. He was survived by his wife, Kathryn Graham; his son, D.H. “Mac” Graham III; his daughter, Pattiann Smith; stepdaughter, Sara P. Hewitt; stepson, Breck Perkins; and five grandchildren, one great-grandchild, and a brother and a sister.
