= Kukui Grove Center =

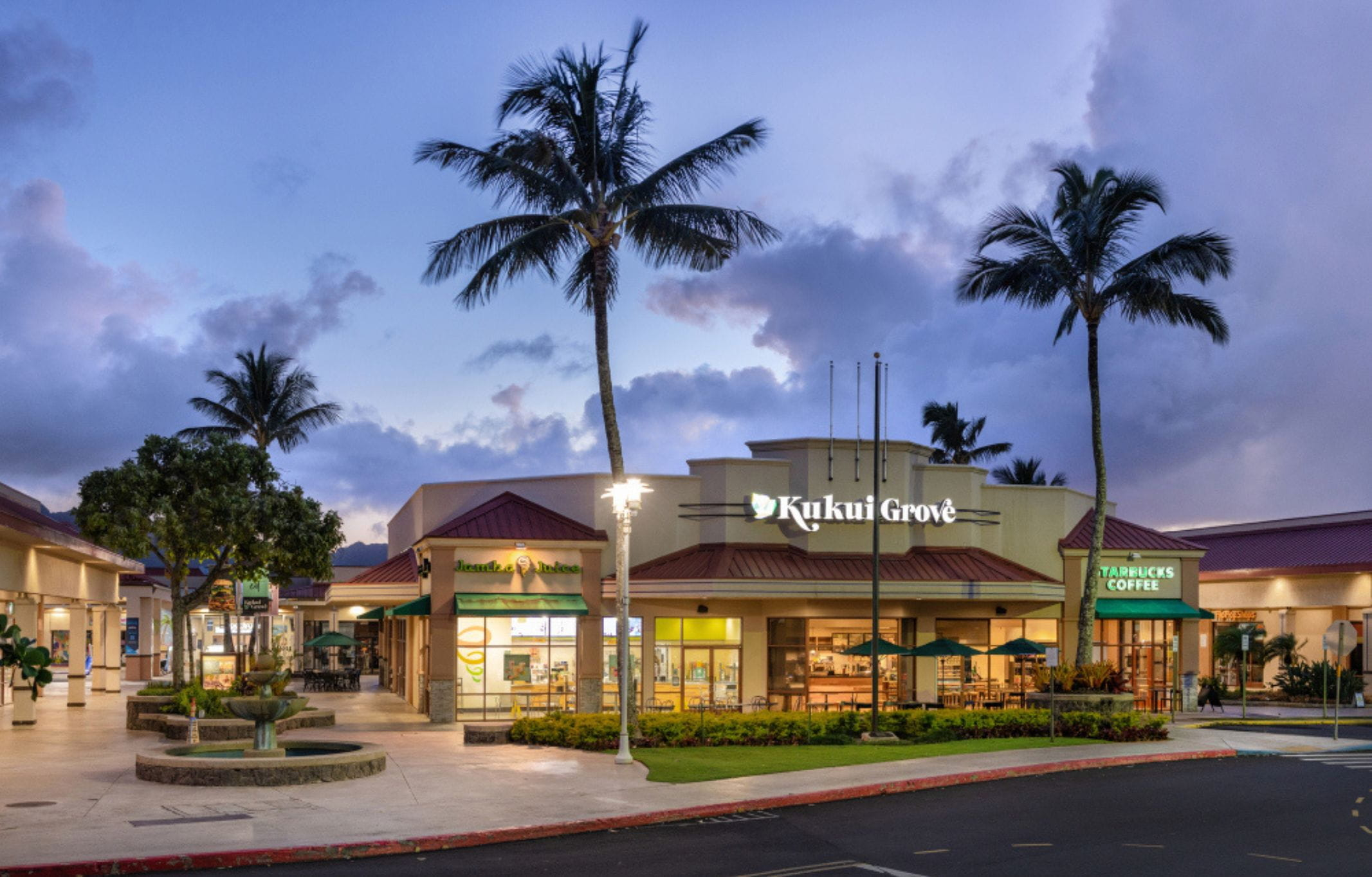
- Kukui Grove's front facade
- Location: Lihue, Hawaii, United States
- Coordinates: 21.969736°N 159.378687°W
- Address: 3-2600 Kaumualii Highway
- Opened: 1982
- Owner: The Festival Companies
- Num. of stores: 65
- Num. of anchor tenants: 6
- Floor area: 312,000 square feet (29,000 m^{2})
- Floors: 1
- Website: www.kukuigrovecenter.com

Kukui Grove Center, often simply called Kukui Grove, is an open-air shopping center located in the retail district of Lihue, Hawaii. It is Kauai's largest mall and only regional mall. This shopping mall features over 55 local, regional, and national shops as well as restaurants. Ross Dress for Less, Times Supermarkets, Longs Drugs, and Target anchor the 50-acre mall. The mall is managed by The Festival Companies.

== Retail Mix and Changes ==
This mall's Macy's store was formerly Liberty House. The mall had two separate Sears stores that both closed in 2013. One of them was originally an F. W. Woolworth Company store. A year later, one became Ross Dress For Less and the other became Sports Authority. On July 28, 2016, The Sports Authority closed due to bankruptcy. In September 2018, Kmart closed. The Kmart store on Kauai was the last one remaining in Hawaii. Target opened a Kauai store on October 19, 2021, which is located in the former Kmart building, occupying approximately 122,000 square feet.

On January 18, 2024, it was announced that Macy's would be closing as part of a plan to close five stores in the United States.

=== New Store Dilemmas ===
As a part of the new ownership by The Festival Companies, Kukui Grove received a fresh look. The entire mall was painted to enhance the aesthetics. According to a leasing plan, Kukui Grove lists Tractor Supply Co. as a new retailer, replacing the former Sports Authority. No confirmation has been given as of October 2025.

== See also ==
- Ala Moana Center
- Windward Mall
- Kahala Mall
