= List of tallest buildings in Honolulu =

Honolulu, the capital of Hawaii, is a major city in the United States. As of late 2020, Honolulu contained over 90 skyscrapers and high-rise buildings exceeding 300 ft (91 m) in height, with four additional buildings under construction at that time.

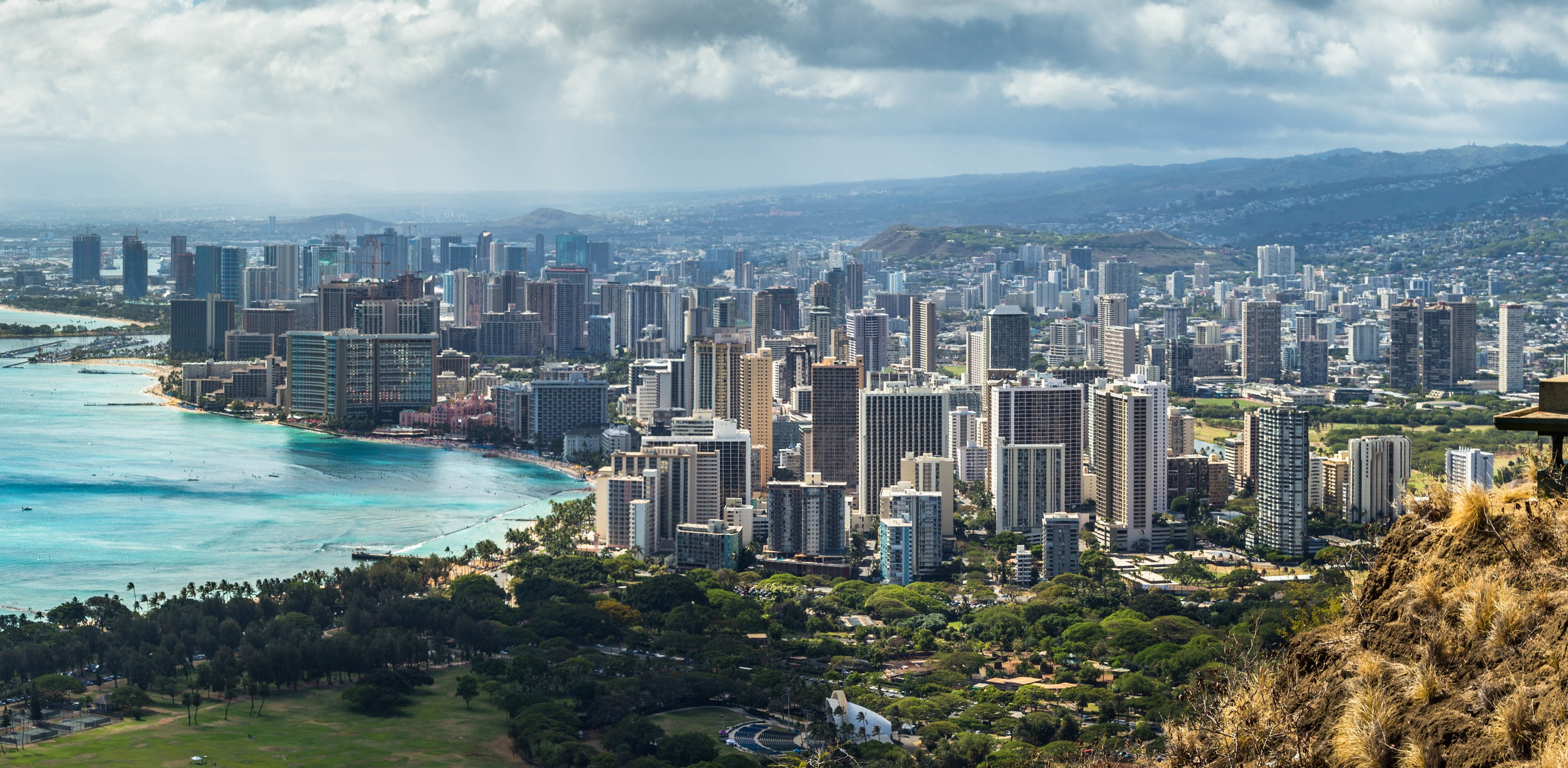
Skyline of Honolulu in 2025

The first building to exceed 350 feet (110 m) was the Ala Moana Hotel, completed in 1970. This was followed by the Yacht Harbor Towers, the Hawaii Monarch Hotel, and the Discovery Bay Center, marking the commencement of an urban construction boom. This period coincided with significant growth in the business and finance sectors. During the 1990s, residential development continued with the completion of several prominent structures, including the One Waterfront Mauka Tower, Imperial Plaza, Nauru Tower, and the Hawaiki Tower.

As of 2026, The Central Ala Moana is the tallest building in Honolulu and the state of Hawaii by roof height at 435 ft (133 m), while the Century Center is the tallest building in Hawaii by overall height at 497 ft (151 m).

== Tallest buildings ==
This section provides a list of skyscrapers and high-rise buildings in Honolulu that reach a minimum height of 300 ft (91 m), determined by standard architectural height measurements. These criteria incorporates permanent spires and architectural details while excluding antenna masts. An equal sign (=) following a rank indicates an identical height for two or more buildings. The "Year" column indicates the year in which a building was completed.

Was the tallest building in Honolulu upon completion

Rank	Name	Image	Height m (ft)	Floors	Year	Primary Use	Notes	References
1	The Central Ala Moana		132.7 m (435 ft)	43	2021	Residential	Tallest building by roof height since 2021.	
2	First Hawaiian Center		130.8 m (429 ft)	30	1996	Office	Tallest office building in Hawaii and the headquarters of First Hawaiian Bank. Tallest building in Hawaii by roof height from 1996 to 2021.	
3	Kō‘ula		128.8 m (423 ft)	41	2022	Residential	Tallest building within the Ward Village complex. Designed by Studio Gang.	
4	The Collection		128.6 m (422 ft)	43	2016	Residential		
5=	Moana Pacific East Tower		128.5 m (422 ft)	46	2008	Residential	Designed by Architects Hawaii Limited.	
5=	Moana Pacific West Tower		128.5 m (422 ft)	46	2008	Residential	Designed by Architects Hawaii Limited.	
7	Keola Lai		127.7 m (419 ft)	42	2008	Residential		
8=	Hokua at 1288 Ala Moana		127.4 m (418 ft)	40	2006	Residential		
8=	Pacifica Honolulu		127.4 m (418 ft)	46	2012	Residential		
8=	The Waiea		127.4 m (418 ft)	36	2016	Residential	Part of the Ward Village complex.	
8=	Waihonua at Kewalo		127.4 m (418 ft)	43	2015	Residential		
8=	The Park on Ke'eaumoku Tower A		127.4 m (418 ft)	44	2025	Residential		
8=	The Park on Ke'eaumoku Tower B		127.4 m (418 ft)	44	2025	Residential		
14	Nauru Tower		127.1 m (417 ft)	44	1992	Residential	The first luxury residential building built in the Ala Moana district. Tallest building in Hawaii by roof height from 1992 to 1996. Designed by Architects Hawaii Limited.	
15=	Ko'olani		126.8 m (416 ft)	48	2006	Residential		
15=	Sky Ala Moana East Tower		126.8 m (416 ft)	43	2023	Residential / Hotel		
15=	Sky Ala Moana West Tower		126.8 m (416 ft)	43	2023	Residential		
15=	Ae'o		126.8 m (416 ft)	40	2018	Residential		
15=	Kapiolani Residence		126.5 m (415 ft)	45	2018	Residential		
20=	801 South Street Building A		126 m (413 ft)	46	2015	Residential	Tallest building in Hawaii by roof height since 2015.	
20=	801 South Street Building B		126 m (413 ft)	46	2017	Residential		
22=	Ke Kilohana		122 m (400 ft)	43	2019	Residential		
22=	Symphony Honolulu		122 m (400 ft)	42	2016	Residential	Formerly known as Symphony Park.	
24=	Hawaiki Tower		121.9 m (400 ft)	46	1999	Residential		
24=	One Waterfront Tower - Mauka		121.9 m (400 ft)	45	1990	Residential	Tallest building in Hawaii by roof height from 1990 to 1992, along with One Waterfront Tower - Makai.	
24=	One Waterfront Tower - Makai		121.9 m (400 ft)	45	1990	Residential	Tallest building in Hawaii by roof height from 1990 to 1992, along with One Waterfront Tower - Mauka.	
24=	One Archer Lane		121.9 m (400 ft)	41	1998	Residential		
24=	Imperial Plaza		121.9 m (400 ft)	40	1992	Residential		
24=	Keauhou Place		121.9 m (400 ft)	40	2017	Residential		
24=	Anaha		121.9 m (400 ft)	38	2017	Residential	Part of the Ward Village complex.	
24=	Grand Islander Tower		121.9 m (400 ft)	37	2017	Hotel	Tallest hotel in Hawaii.	
32	Ala Moana Hotel		120.7 m (396 ft)	38	1970	Hotel	Tallest building in Hawaii from 1970 to 1978.	
33	1132 Bishop Street		118 m (387 ft)	31	1991	Office		
34=	Hyatt Regency Waikiki Diamond Head Tower		117.7 m (386 ft)	39	1976	Hotel	Formerly known as Hemmeter Center 2.	
34=	Hyatt Regency Waikiki Ewa Tower		117.7 m (386 ft)	39	1976	Hotel	Formerly known as Hemmeter Center 1.	
36=	Endeavor Condominium		114.9 m (377 ft)	42	1976	Residential		
36=	Resolution Condominium		114.9 m (377 ft)	42	1976	Residential		
38=	Century Center		114.3 m (375 ft)	41	1978	Residential	Tallest building in Hawaii by total height since 1978. 151.5 m (497 ft) tall with spire.	
38=	Tapa Tower		114.3 m (375 ft)	36	1982	Hotel	Tallest building within the Hilton Hawaiian Village complex.	
39	The Watermark		113.7 m (373 ft)	37	2008	Residential	Designed by Architects Hawaii Limited.	
40	Ohana Maile Sky Court		112.5 m (369 ft)	44	1984	Hotel		
41	Grand Waikikian		112.2 m (368 ft)	38	2008	Residential / Hotel	Part of the Hilton Hawaiian Village complex.	
42	Ka Laʻi Waikīkī Beach Hotel		112.1 m (368 ft)	39	2009	Hotel	Formerly known as Trump International Hotel Waikiki. Designed by Guerin Glass Architects.	
43	Pauahi Tower		112 m (367 ft)	28	1984	Office		
44	The Ritz-Carlton Residences, Waikiki Beach, Diamond Head Tower		110 m (361 ft)	39	2018	Residential		
45	Yacht Harbor Tower II		107 m (351 ft)	38	1973	Residential		
46=	Yacht Harbor Tower I		106.7 m (350 ft)	38	1972	Residential		
46=	The Windsor		106.7 m (350 ft)	44	1983	Residential	Originally known and operated as the Outrigger Hobron Hotel, it was converted into a residential complex in 2003.	
46=	Hawaii Monarch Hotel		106.7 m (350 ft)	43	1979	Residential / Hotel		
46=	The Aqua Waikiki Marina Towers		106.7 m (350 ft)	39	1984	Residential		
46=	Honolulu Tower		106.7 m (350 ft)	40	1982	Residential		
46=	Franklin Towers		106.7 m (350 ft)	41	1982	Residential		
46=	Island Colony		106.7 m (350 ft)	44	1978	Residential / Hotel		
46=	Executive Center		106.7 m (350 ft)	41	1973	Office / Residential / Hotel		
54=	Waikiki Beach Tower		105.8 m (347 ft)	39	1978	Residential		
54=	Hawaii Prince I		105.8 m (347 ft)	32	1990	Hotel		
54=	Hawaii Prince II		105.8 m (347 ft)	32	1990	Hotel		
57	Royal Kuhio		105.5 m (346 ft)	39	1976	Residential		
58	Century Square		104.9 m (344 ft)	37	1982	Office / Residential		
59	Iolani Court Plaza		103.9 m (341 ft)	40	1979 Residential			
60	Hale Kaheka		102.7 m (337 ft)	38	1982 Residential			
61	The Villa on Eaton Square		102.1 m (335 ft)	37	1975 Residential			
62=	Ala Wai Plaza Skyrise		101.5 m (333 ft)	38	1972 Residential			
62=	Marco Polo Residences		101.5 m (333 ft)	36	1971	Residential	Severely damaged by fire on July 14, 2017.	
64	Waikiki Landmark		97.5 m (320 ft)	38	1993	Residential		
65	Sheraton Waikiki Hotel		96 m (315 ft)	29	1971	Hotel		
66	1350 Ala Moana		94.2 m (309 ft)	33	1968	Residential	Tallest building in Hawaii from 1968 to 1970.	
67=	Lanikea at Waikiki		91.4 m (300 ft)	29	2005	Residential		
67=	Ala Moana Building		91.4 m (300 ft)	23	1959	Office / Retail	Tallest building in Hawaii from 1959 to 1968.	

== Tallest buildings under construction, approved, or proposed ==
Rank	Name	Height m (ft)	Floors	Estimated Completion	Uses	Status	Notes
1	Mana'olana Place	127.4 m (418 ft)	36		Residential / Hotel	Proposed	If built, the building will feature a Mandarin Oriental hotel containing 125 guest rooms, along with 99 branded luxury residences managed by the hotel group. As of 2026, the status of the development remains unconfirmed, with no official groundbreaking date having been formally announced.
2	The Launiu	121.9 m (400 ft)	40	2028	Residential	Under Construction	The building will be a luxury residential development situated in the Kakaʻako district. It marks the 11th residential project established by the Howard Hughes Corporation within the 60-acre Ward Village master planned community.
3	AMB Tower	106.7 m (350 ft)	36	2029	Hotel	Approved	Will become the part of the Hilton Hawaiian Village complex. The project is set to be the ninth building within the resort and will contribute 515 guest rooms to the property. Construction is scheduled to begin in 2026.

== Tallest unbuilt ==
Rank	Name	Height m (ft)	Floors	Year Proposed	Uses	Notes
1	690 Pohukaina	198 m (650 ft)	60	2012	Residential	The project was initially proposed in 2012 by the Ohio-based developer Forest City Hawaii as a 60-story skyscraper. Due to height restrictions within the Kakaʻako district, the development was ultimately scaled down to a 400-foot, 39-story tower and renamed as Pohukaina Commons. Had the project been completed according to its original specifications, the tower might have surpassed the Century Center to become the tallest building in Hawaii.

== Gallery ==
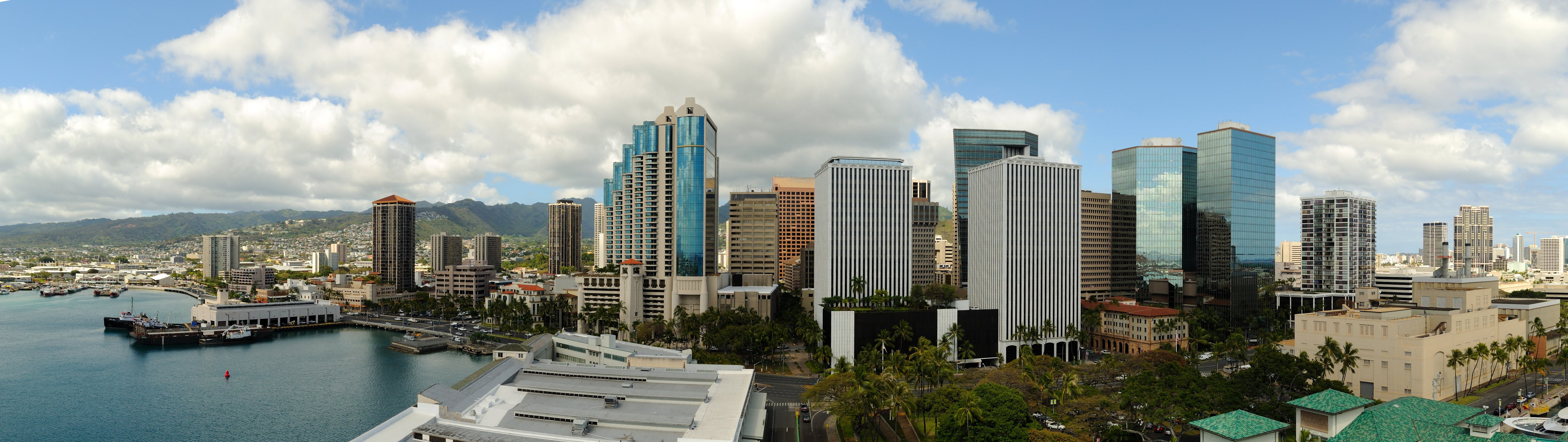
View of Downtown Honolulu from Aloha Tower

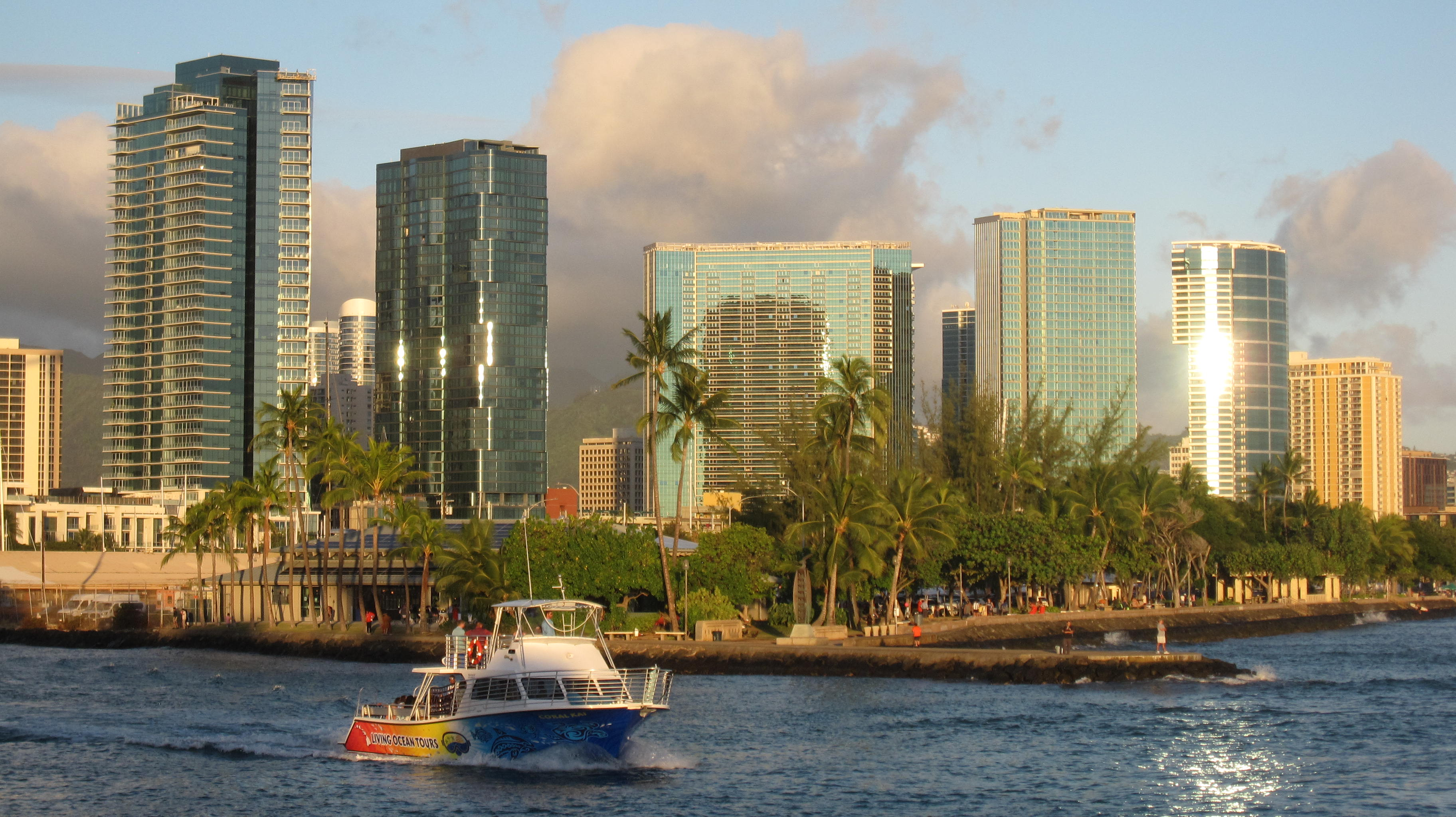
Panorama from Kakaʻako Waterfront Park with the Anaha and the Ko'olani (center)

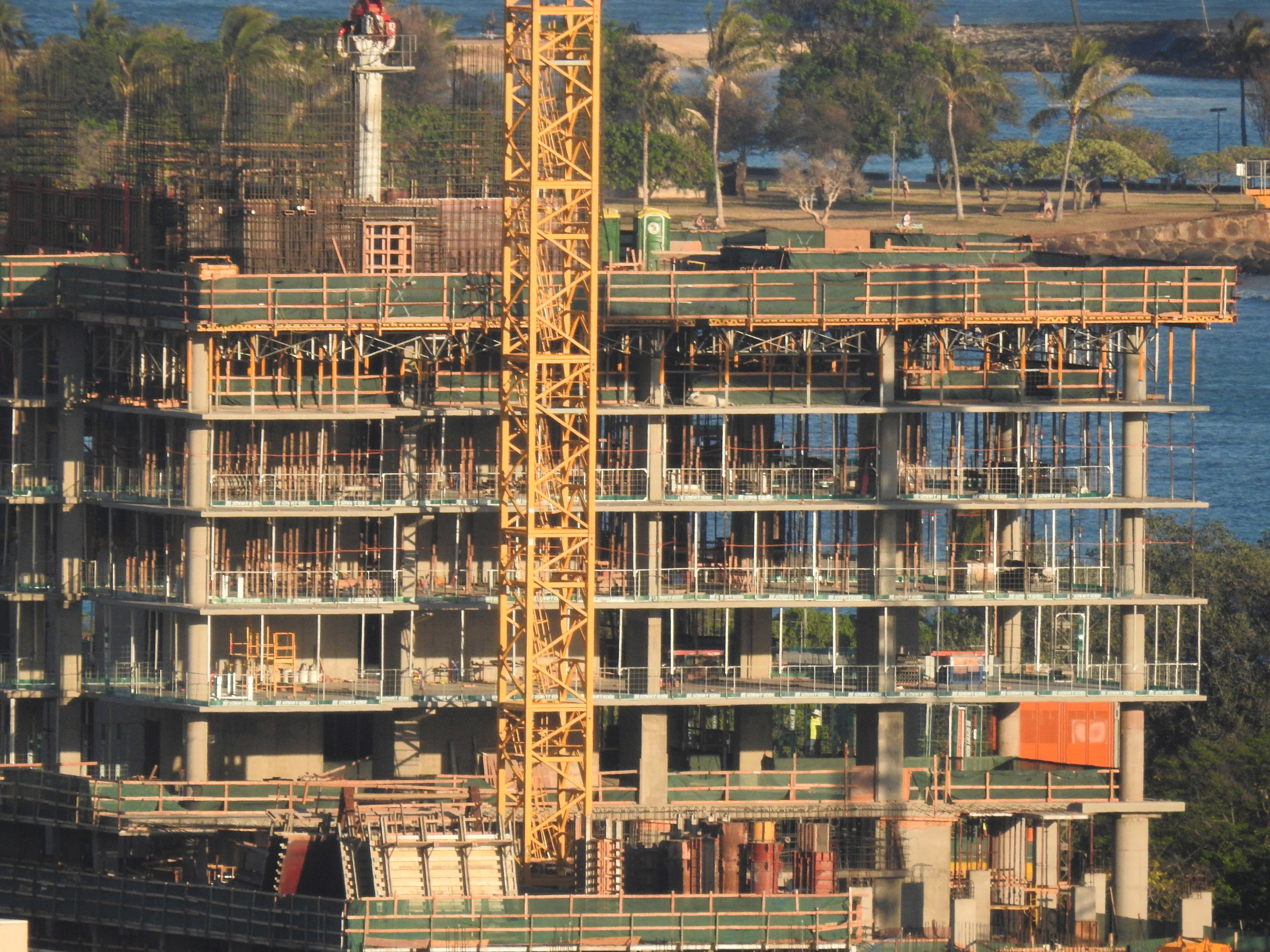
Construction of Waiea

== See also ==
- List of tallest buildings in Oceania
