= Nauru Tower =

Luxury residential skyscraper in Kakaʻako, Honolulu, Hawaii

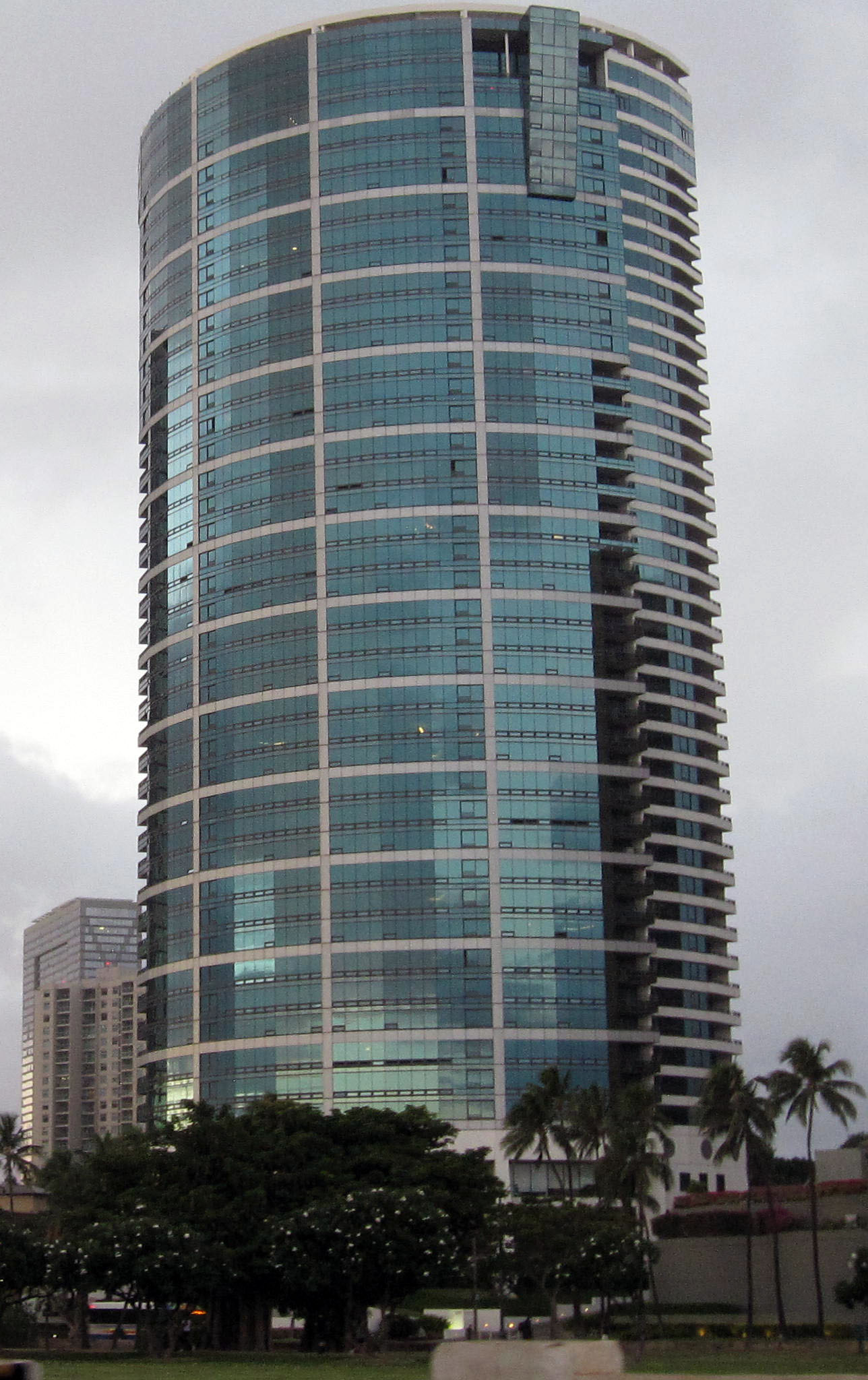
- Nauru Tower in November 2021

General information
- Status: Completed
- Type: Residential
- Architectural style: Modern
- Location: 1330 Ala Moana Blvd, Kakaʻako, Honolulu, Hawaii
- Coordinates: 21°17′30.9″N 157°50′56.4″W
- Completed: 1992
- Cost: $90,000,000

Height
- Roof: 127.1 m (417 ft)

Technical details
- Structural system: Concrete
- Floor count: 44
- Lifts/elevators: 8

Design and construction
- Architecture firm: Architects Hawaii Ltd. (AHL)
- Developer: Nauru Phosphate Royalties Development Inc.

Other information
- Number of rooms: 314

Website
- https://naurutower.org/

Nauru Tower is a luxury residential skyscraper located on the border between the Ala Moana and Kakaʻako districts in Honolulu, Hawaii. Completed in 1992, the building reaches a height of 127.1 m (417 ft) and features 44 floors. As of 2026, it is currently the ninth-tallest building in Honolulu and Hawaii overall.

== History ==
The skyscraper was developed by Nauru Phosphate Royalties Development Inc., a corporate subsidiary backed by the Republic of Nauru, which utilized revenues generated from the island nation's extensive phosphate mining industry to fund international real estate investments. The name of the skyscraper directly reflects this financial origin, representing the sovereign investment trust established to diversify economic assets. Designed by the architectural firm Architects Hawaii Ltd. (AHL), the $90 million luxury high-rise project was constructed to anchor the upscale residential redevelopment of the Ala Moana and Kakaʻako districts. The engineering and design execution earned the project an Excellence Award from the Consulting Engineers Council of Hawaii, alongside regional acclaim as a Building of the Year.

The structural engineering of the skyscraper prioritized a distinct semicircular, single-loaded floor plan designed to ensure that every residential unit faces outward toward the coastline without interior-facing obstructions. Upon its completion, Nauru Tower became the second-tallest building in Hawaii after the Century Center and held the title of the tallest building in Hawaii by roof height until 1996, when the First Hawaiian Center surpassed it. Its cylindrical glass configuration, high-tech curtain wall detailing, and expansive recreational deck established an enduring architectural benchmark for luxury high-rise development along Honolulu's southern coastline.

== Gallery ==
A view of the Honolulu skyline featuring Hokua at 1288 Ala Moana (left), Nauru Tower (middle), and 1350 Ala Moana (right)

== See also ==
- Hawaiian architecture
- List of tallest buildings in Honolulu
