= The Central Ala Moana =

Residential skyscraper in Ala Moana, Honolulu, Hawaii

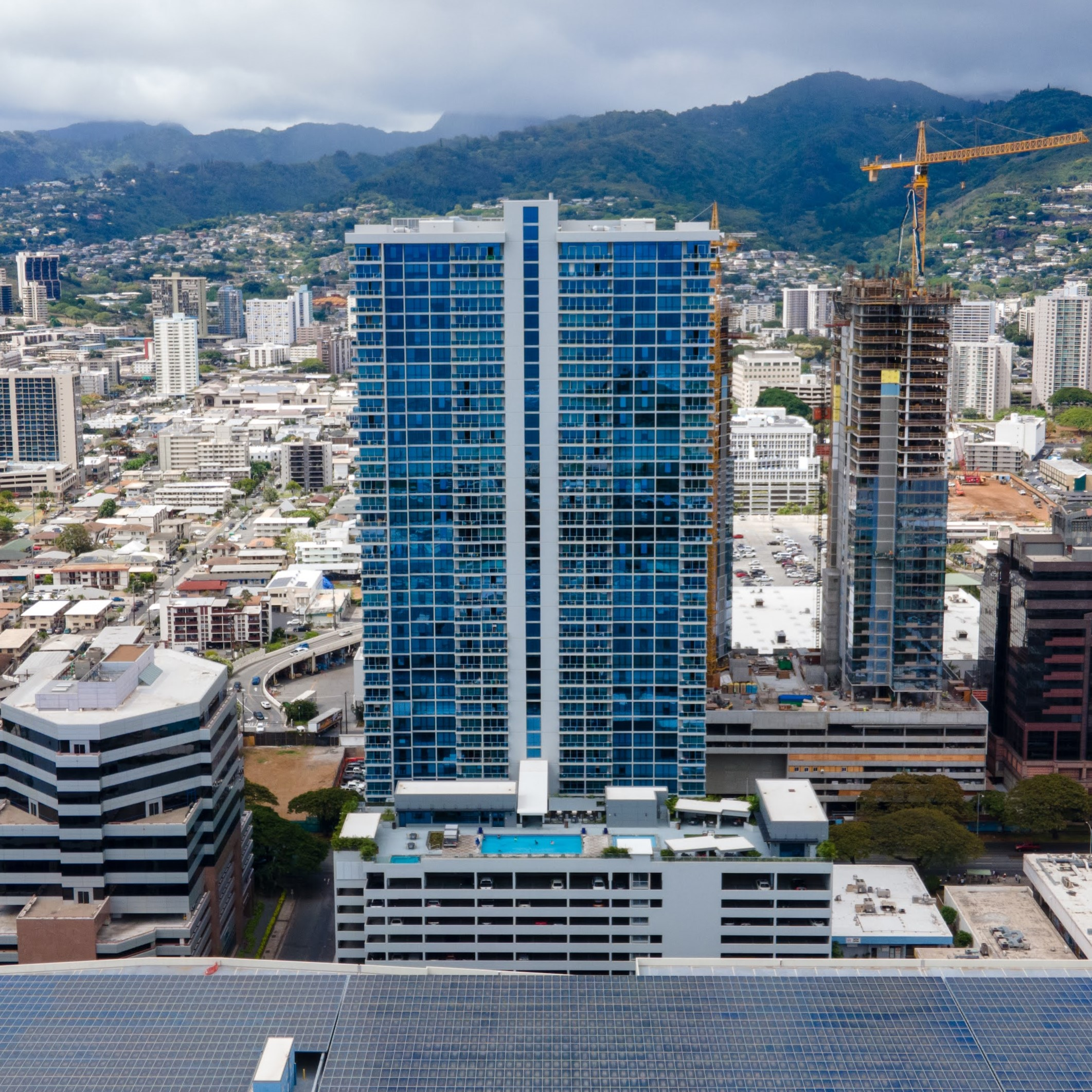
- The Central Ala Moana in June 2022

General information
- Status: Completed
- Type: Residential
- Architectural style: Contemporary
- Location: 1391 Kapiolani Blvd, Ala Moana, Honolulu, Hawaii
- Coordinates: 21°17′36.1″N 157°50′37.4″W
- Construction started: 2019
- Completed: 2021

Height
- Roof: 132.7 m (435 ft)

Technical details
- Structural system: Concrete
- Floor count: 43
- Lifts/elevators: 5

Design and construction
- Architecture firm: Design Partners Incorporated
- Developer: Samkoo Pacific LLC
- Main contractor: Hawaiian Dredging Construction Company

Other information
- Number of rooms: 512

Website
- https://www.thecentralalamoana.com/index.html

The Central Ala Moana is a residential skyscraper situated in the Ala Moana district of Honolulu, Hawaii. Constructed between 2019 and 2021, the building reaches a height of 132.7 m (435 ft) and contains 43 floors.

As of 2026, it is currently the second-tallest building in Hawaii overall, following the Century Center, and remains the tallest building in the state when measured by roof height, as well as the tallest residential building in Hawaii. The skyscraper is located within a dense urban landscape that encompasses over 90 skyscrapers and high-rises.

== History ==
The skyscraper is situated in the Ala Moana district of Honolulu, in immediate proximity to Ala Moana Beach Park. Due to its location, the development is subject to requirements mandated by the Hawaii Housing Finance and Development Corporation and the Hawaii Community Development Authority.

These regulations necessitate that developers negotiate with the state regarding the allocation of affordable housing units within their projects. A standard has been established utilizing a 60/40 ratio between affordable and market-rate units, a framework applied to the Kapiolani Residences and subsequently implemented for The Central Ala Moana project.

The Central Ala Moana was developed by the South Korean company Samkoo Pacific LLC under a state affordable housing initiative that provided the developer with density and height incentives, alongside approximately $13 million in fee exemptions. In exchange for these concessions, the developer committed to reserving 60% of the 512 total units for moderate-income families. Construction of the skyscraper began in 2019 and reached completion and was inaugurated in 2021.

== See also ==
- List of tallest buildings in Honolulu
