= Tri Counties Bank =

Bank headquartered in Chico, CA

- The current logo, in use since 2025

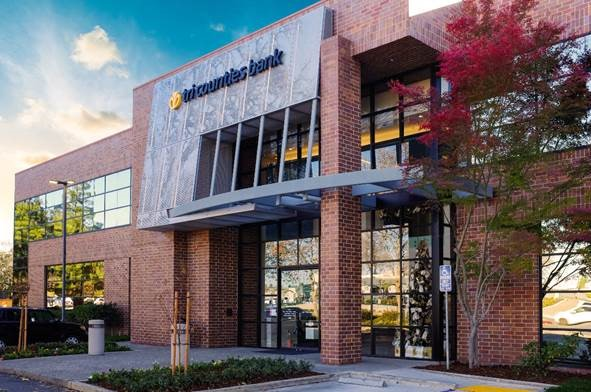
- The Tri Counties Bank regional headquarters in Roseville, California.
- Type: Public; Subsidiary
- Traded as: Nasdaq: TCBK
- Industry: Banking
- Founded: March 11, 1975; 51 years ago in Chico, California
- Headquarters: Chico, California
- Number of locations: 64 branches, 8 loan production offices (2024)
- Area served: United States
- Key people: Richard P. Smith (President and CEO)
- Products: Checking; Savings; Private bank; Commercial banking; Business banking; Consumer loans; Mortgage loans; Credit cards; Online banking; Investments
- Services: Banking; Financial services
- Net income: ▲US$114.9 million (2024)
- Total assets: ▲US$9.7 billion (2024)
- Number of employees: 1,511 (2024)
- Parent: TriCo Bancshares
- Website: www.tcbk.com

Tri Counties Bank is a financial institution headquartered in Chico, California. It is a subsidiary of holding company TriCo Bancshares (NASDAQ: TCBK) headquartered in Chico, California. The first branch opened in 1975 to serve the Butte, Glenn, and Tehama counties, from which the bank received its name. As of 2024, the bank has over 64 branches in California, 8 loan production offices, over 40,000 ATMs nationwide, and total assets of approximately $9.7 billion.

== History ==
At its inception in 1974, a group of farmers and small business owners within the Chico area came together to form their own bank and assist local growers. The company began operations with Robert H. Steveson as the first president and CEO.

TriCo Bancshares was incorporated in 1981. It was formed as a holding company, with Tri Counties Bank as its sole subsidiary. Later that year, Tri Counties Bank merged with Shasta County Bank. The bank opened in store branches in 1994 to bring financial services into supermarkets. After Stevenson retired in 1999, Richard P. Smith became the president and CEO of the company.

In 2010, Richard P. Smith was named the chairman of the California Bankers Association and held the position through 2011, when the company acquired Citizens Bank of Northern California after regulators ordered it to permanently close due to financial loss from non-performing loans.

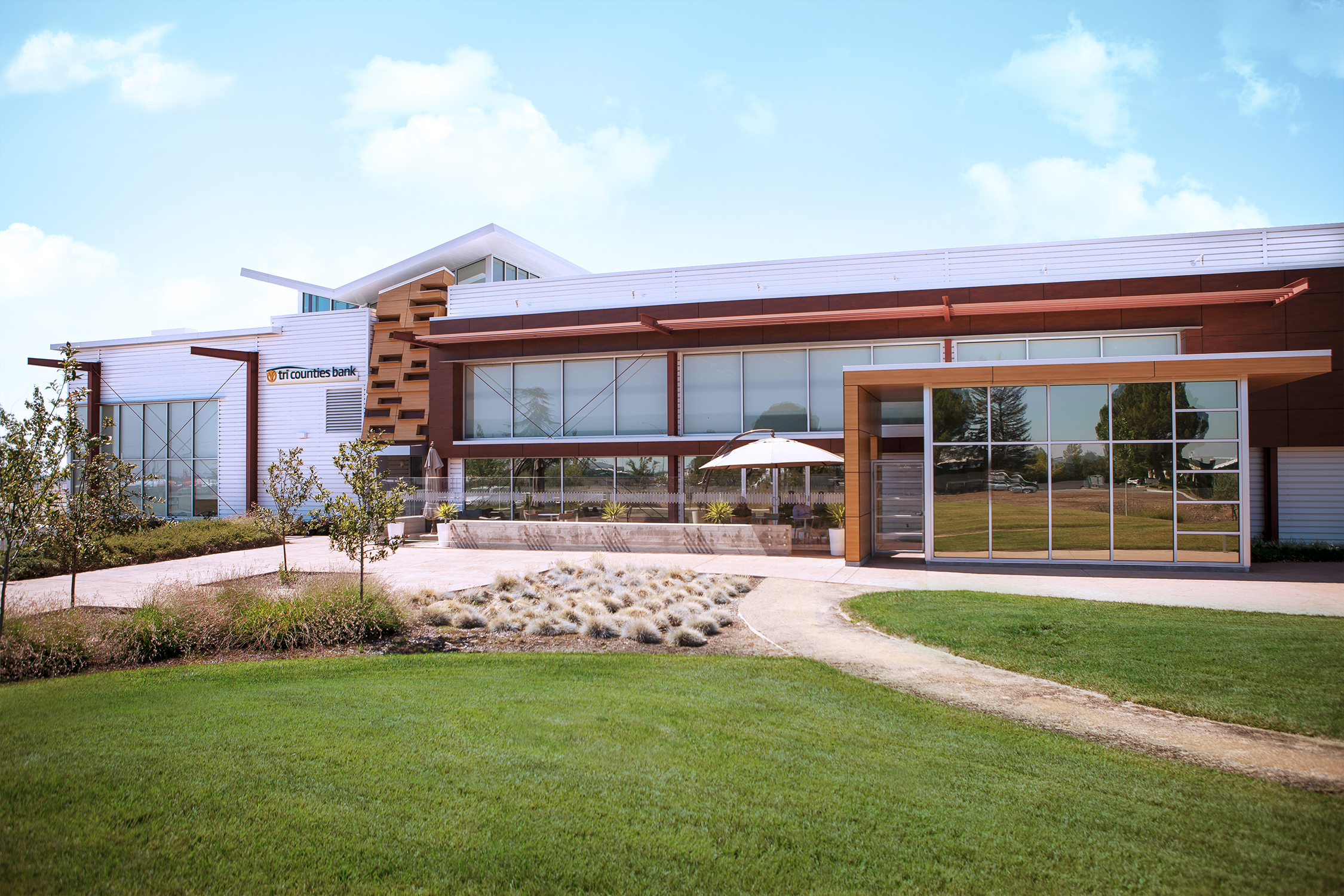
The Tri Counties Bank campus building in Chico, California.

In 2013, the company opened a new $9 million campus at the Chico Airport complex, which houses information technology, operations, a call center, and training departments.

The company then acquired North Valley Bank in 2014, expanding Humboldt, Trinity, and Sonoma counties. Three members of North Valley's board of directors joined the Tri Counties Bank board, which grew from nine seats to twelve. In 2018, the company acquired First National Bank of Northern California, expanding into the Bay Area market.

In 2020, the Sacramento Business Journal nominated Bindu Jaduram with Tri Counties Bank as one of the year's Women Who Mean Business honorees. Jaduram helped the company expand its footprint by launching twelve new branches. A 2021 survey published in Forbes magazine of America's Best In-State-Banks ranked Tri Counties Bank as No. 2 in California.

In 2021, the company acquired Valley Republic Bank. After the acquisition, the combined bank had more than $10 billion in assets.

On July 13, 2026, Tri Counties Bank entered into an agreement to be acquired by First Hawaiian Bank in a $2 billion all stock deal. First Hawaiian will have about $34 billion worth of assets, and it will be the sixth largest bank headquartered in the Western U.S.

== Operations ==
The bank offers consumer banking products and services including mortgage loans, credit cards, online banking, and investments. It operates standalone branches as well as in-store branches, such as in supermarkets.

The company's current headquarters opened in 1998 on Constitution Drive in Chico, California.

In 2013, the company opened a training and operations campus at the Chico Airport complex. In 2017, the company purchased a building in Roseville, California, for its new regional headquarters. Other Roseville facilities include a Small Business Administration loan office and a separate commercial lending office. In August 2021, the company entered Los Angeles County by opening a lending center in Pasadena, California. Other Southern California offices in Irvine and San Diego opened at the same time.

The company is active in philanthropy, having directly donated or helped raise over $450,000 for local causes, including funds for a local medical center, aid for the victims of the 2018 Carr Fire, and funds for local black businesses.

== Chief executives ==
- Robert H. Steveson, November 1999 – 2001
- Richard P. Smith, March 2001 – present
