= La Ronde (restaurant) =

Defunct revolving restaurant in Honolulu, Hawaii, United States

Coordinates: 21°17′34″N 157°50′35″W

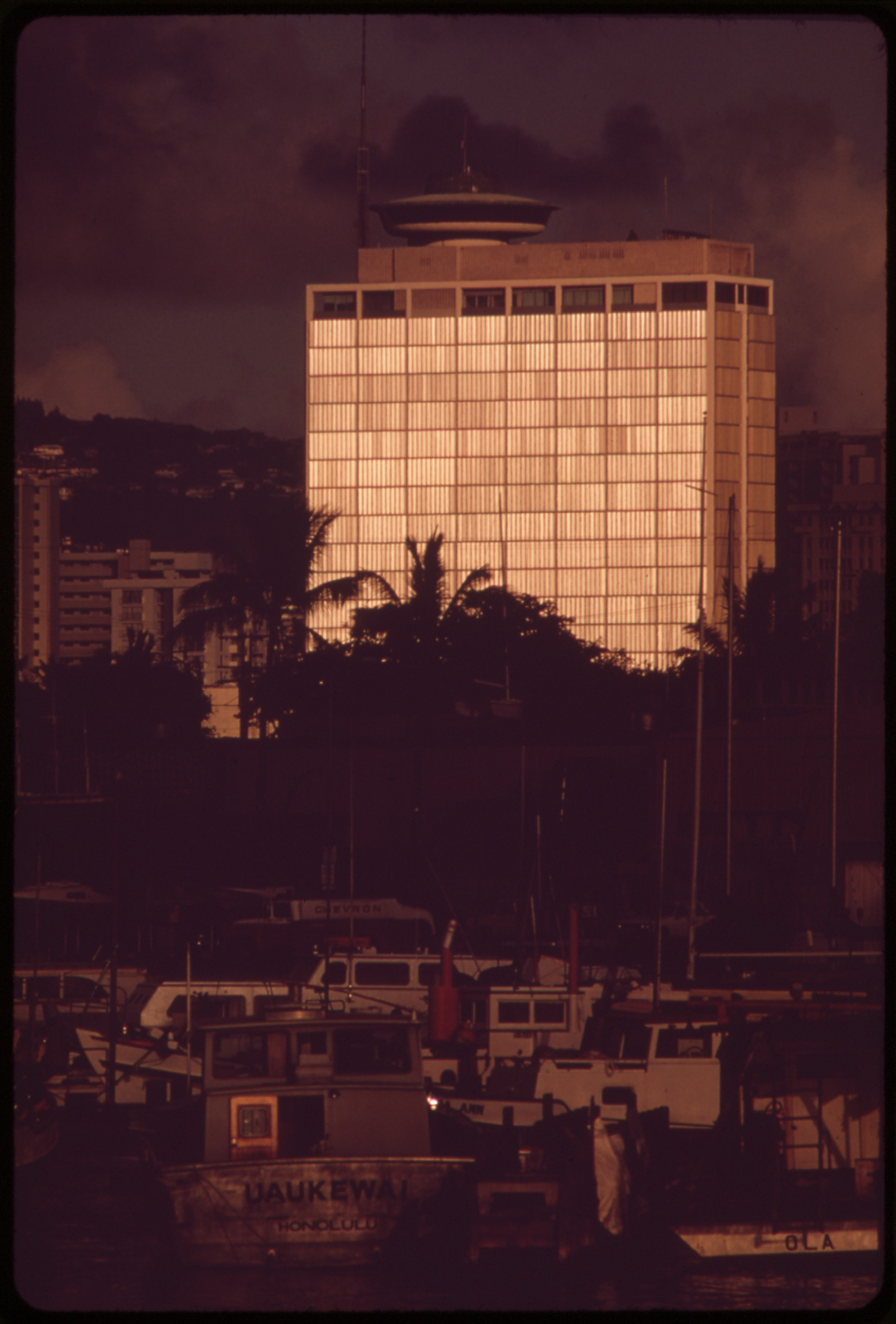
La Ronde (atop the Ala Moana Office Building)

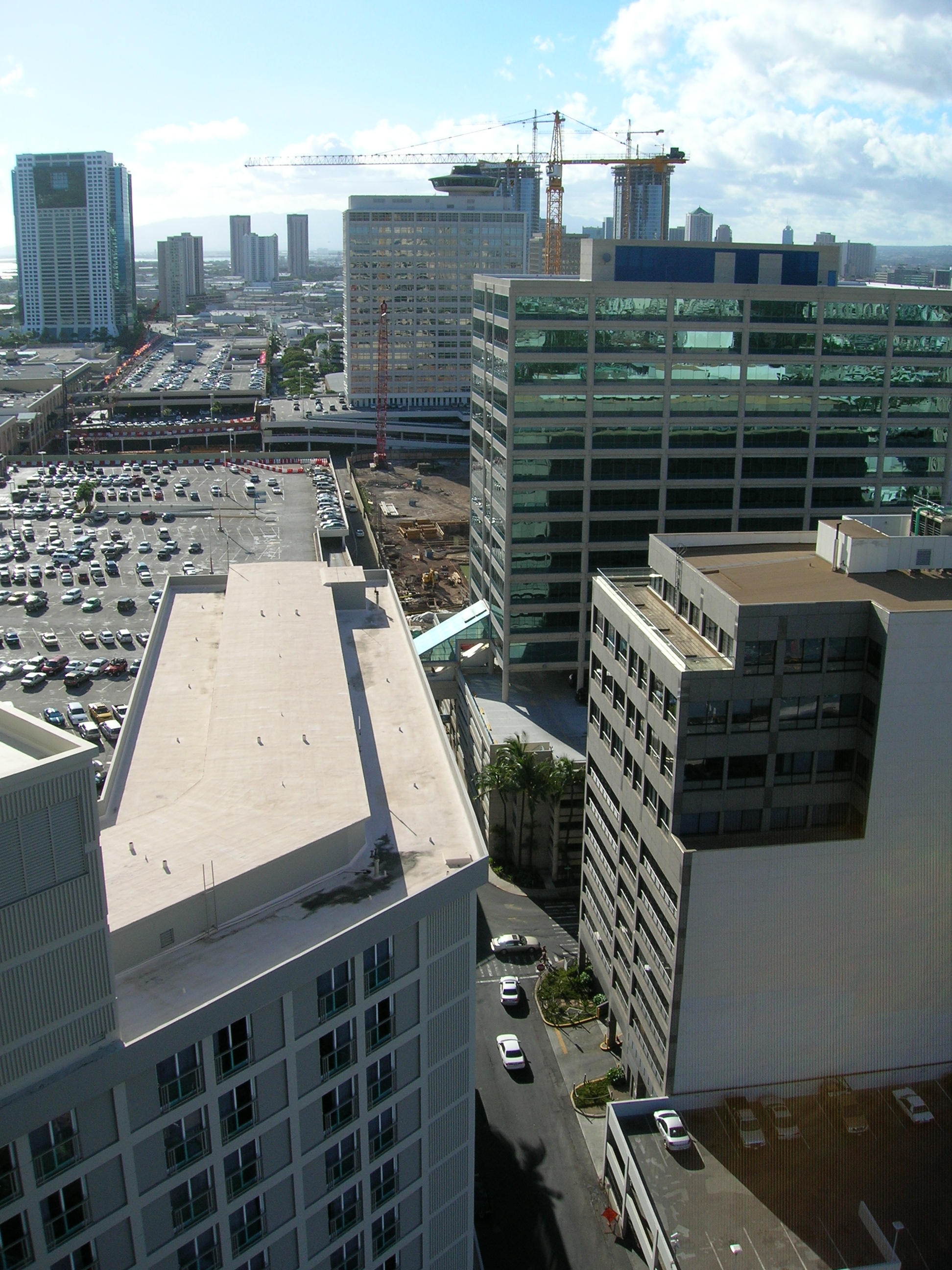
La Ronde (atop in center of image)

La Ronde was a restaurant in Honolulu, Hawaii. Built in 1961 and designed by John Graham, it was the first revolving restaurant in the United States (preceding the "Eye of the Needle" restaurant in Seattle) and the third of its kind (after the Florian Tower and the Cairo Tower) in the world. The restaurant is now closed.

== Building ==
The restaurant was situated at 1441 Kapi'olani Boulevard in the Ala Moana district of Honolulu. It was located on the 23rd floor of the Ala Moana Building, adjacent to the Ala Moana Complex shopping center.

The restaurant was 72 ft (22 m) in diameter with a 16-foot-wide (4.9 m) revolving carousel which rotated around a fixed core and had a seating capacity of 162 guests. The office building has a total height of 25 floors and 298 ft (91 m) including an observation deck at the top. The rotational speed was 1 rotation per hour.

== History ==
The building was designed by John Graham Jr. of the architectural firm John Graham & Company. The building was completed in 1960 and inaugurated 21 November 1961. At that time, it was the highest building in Honolulu.

Graham received a patent for the revolving design in 1964 (US patent No. 3125189). Later, the restaurant was renamed "Windows of Hawaii" but closed completely in the mid-1990s. The premises were converted to office space, and the floor was welded into place.

There was another revolving restaurant in Hawaii, called Top of Waikiki. It was closed in 2020 due to the COVID-19 pandemic.
