= The Collection (skyscraper) =

Luxury residential skyscraper in Kakaʻako, Honolulu, Hawaii

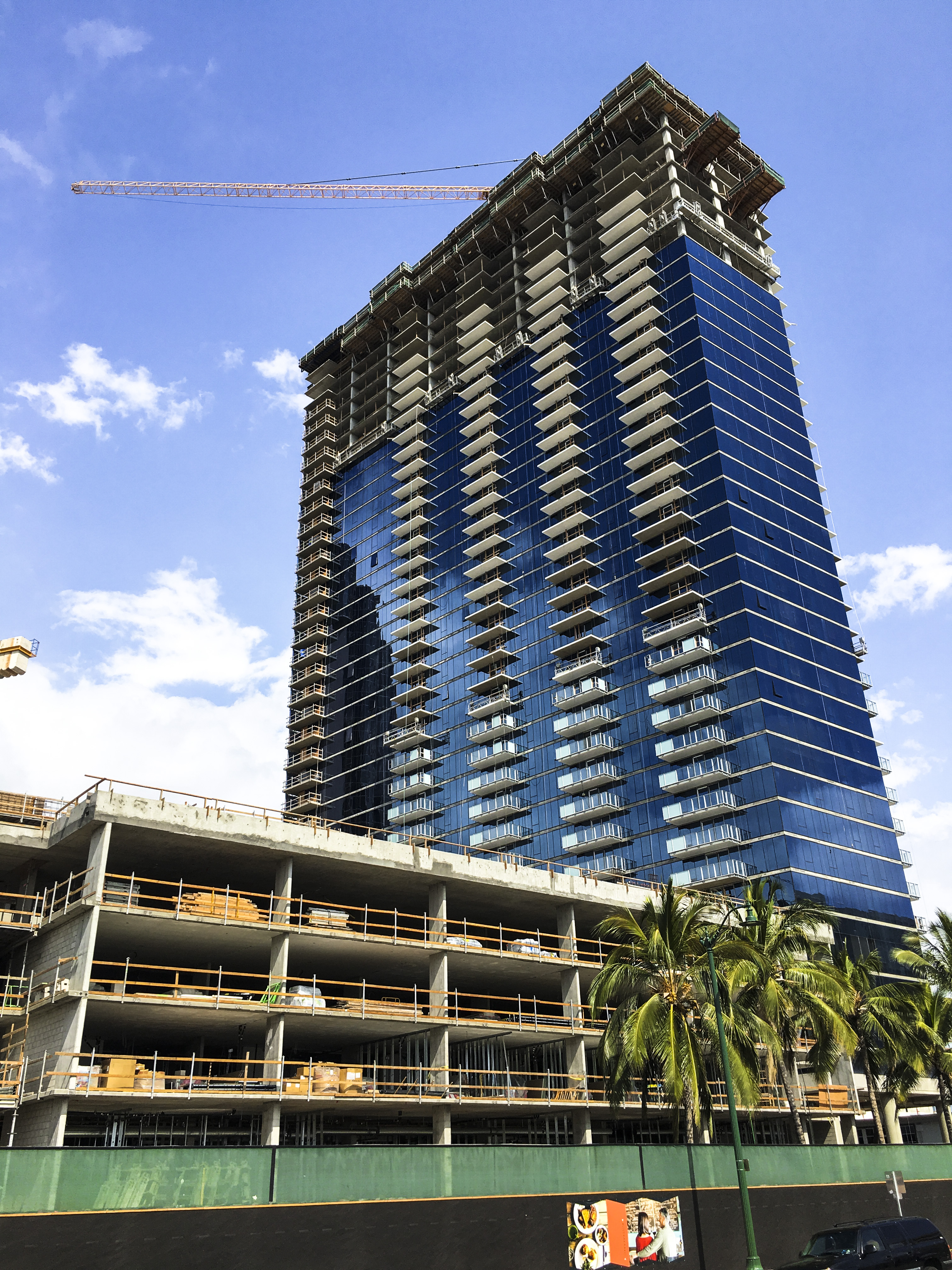
- The Collection under construction in March 2016

General information
- Status: Completed
- Type: Residential
- Architectural style: Contemporary
- Location: 600 Ala Moana Blvd, Kakaʻako, Honolulu, Hawaii
- Coordinates: 21°17′55.8″N 157°51′42.6″W
- Construction started: 2015
- Completed: 2016
- Cost: $200,000,000

Height
- Roof: 128.6 m (422 ft)

Technical details
- Structural system: Concrete
- Floor count: 43
- Lifts/elevators: 4

Design and construction
- Architecture firm: Pappageorge Haymes Partners
- Developer: Alexander & Baldwin (A&B)
- Structural engineer: Sowlat Structural Engineers
- Main contractor: Hawaiian Dredging Construction Company

Other information
- Number of rooms: 397

Website
- https://www.thecollectionhonolulu.com/

The Collection is a residential skyscraper situated in the Kakaʻako district of Honolulu, Hawaii. Constructed between 2015 and 2016, the building reaches a height of 128.6 m (422 ft) and encompasses 43 floors. As of 2026, the building currently ranks as the fifth-tallest building in Hawaii, and it is the fourth-tallest building in the state when measured by roof height.

== History ==
The project was designed by the architecture firm Pappageorge Haymes Partners and developed by Alexander & Baldwin within the Kakaʻako district of Honolulu. The development offers ten distinct residential unit configurations, ranging in size from 580 to 1,217 square feet (54 to 113 square meters). Resident amenities include social spaces, landscaped green areas, swimming pools, and a fitness center, alongside ground-level retail and dining establishments.

Located in Kakaʻako, The Collection is a mixed-use development encompassing a 3.3-acre site managed by The Collection LLC, a subsidiary of Alexander & Baldwin Properties, Inc. The complex comprises a 43-story residential skyscraper containing 397 units, a 4-story mid-rise building with 54 units, and 14 townhomes. The project also features five commercial spaces totaling 12,987 square feet (1,206 square meters) and a 6-story parking structure providing 921 on-site parking spaces.

== See also ==
- List of tallest buildings in Honolulu
