= Windward Mall =

- Location: 46-056 Kamehameha Highway; Kaneohe, Hawaii
- Coordinates: 21.4205°N 157.8046°W
- Opened: 1982
- Manager: Jones Lang LaSalle
- Owner: Kamehameha Schools
- Num. of anchor tenants: 4
- Floor area: 530,000 square feet (49,000 m^{2})
- Website: windwardmall.com

Windward Mall is an enclosed shopping center located in Kāneʻohe, Hawaiʻi, which is anchored by Target, Ross Dress for Less, Planet Fitness, and Regal Cinemas. The 530,000-square-foot (49,000 m^{2}) mall, is on property owned by Kamehameha Schools, and is managed by Jones Lang LaSalle (JLL). The property was previously managed by GPP (General Growth Properties) until 2011.

In 2006, the mall underwent a significant $23 million renovation to improve the interior and add new retail tenants.

The JCPenney anchor store closed in 1998 and the structure was remodeled with a Ross Dress for Less on the lower level and a Regal Cinemas on the upper level.

The Sears anchor store closed on April 30, 2019 and was replaced by Target in 2022.

The Macy's anchor store (originally a Liberty House) closed in 2023 and was demolished in early 2024.

Windward Mall is home to many events such as the Plenty of Aloha Farmer's Market, which has been held in the mall for the past 15 years.

Since 2024, Windward Mall has hosted the finals of the Hawaii Club Volleyball Championship, a premier statewide youth tournament organized by a local non-profit organization 7Gen Culture, featuring the top club teams competing for the title in a unique center-court setting inside the mall.

Planet Fitness opened in late 2025 on the site of the former demolished Macy’s as a new anchor space was built on the site specifically for new anchor tenants to occupy. Planet Fitness occupied the leasable space.

== See also ==
- Ala Moana Center
- Kahala Mall
