= Ala Moana Hotel =

Skyscraper hotel in Ala Moana, Honolulu, Hawaii

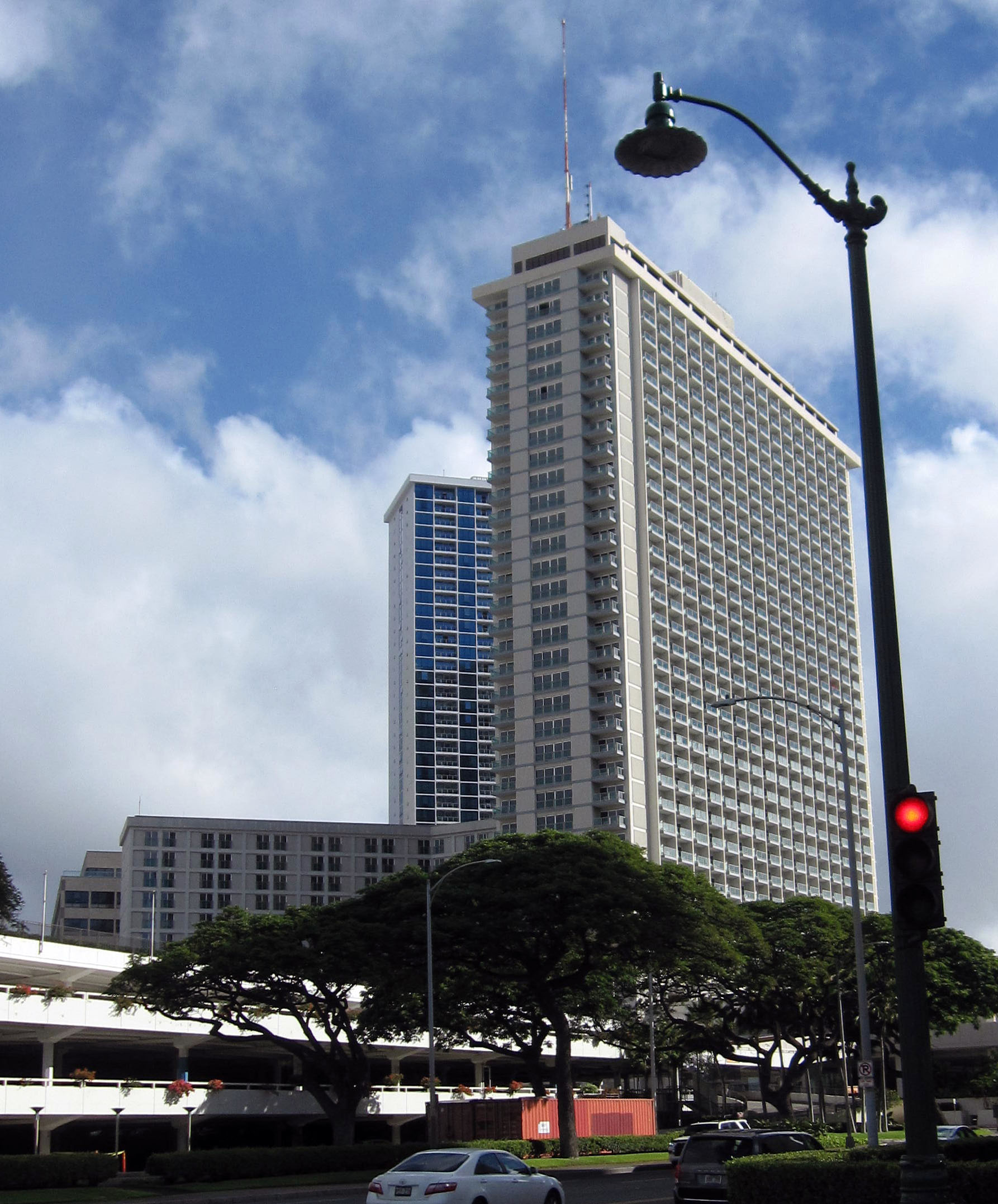
- Ala Moana Hotel in November 2021
- Hotel chain: Mantra

General information
- Status: Completed
- Type: Hotel
- Location: Honolulu, Hawaii, 410 Atkinson Dr.
- Coordinates: 21°17′26″N 157°50′23″W
- Construction started: 1968
- Completed: 1970

Height
- Roof: 120.7 m (396 ft)

Technical details
- Structural system: Concrete
- Floor count: 38

Design and construction
- Architect: John Graham & Company
- Developer: Reed and Lloyd Martin
- Structural engineer: Alfred A. Yee & Associates
- Main contractor: Hawaiian Dredging & Construction Company

Other information
- Number of rooms: 1,176
- Number of restaurants: 5

Website
- https://www.mantrahotels.com/ala-moana-hotel-by-mantra/

The Ala Moana Hotel is a skyscraper hotel in Honolulu, Hawaii. Constructed between 1968 and 1970, the building reaches a height of 120.7 m (396 ft) and contains 38 floors. Upon completion, it was the first building in Hawaii to exceed 100 m (328 ft) and the first modern skyscraper in the state. It held the title of the tallest building in Hawaii until 1978, when it was surpassed by the Century Center. Additionally, it remained the tallest building in the state by roof height until 1990, when it was surpassed by the One Waterfront Towers. The hotel adjoins the Ala Moana Shopping Center and is situated across the street from the Hawaii Convention Center and Ala Moana Beach Park.

== History ==
The skyscraper was designed by the Seattle-based architectural firm John Graham & Company. It opened in 1970 as part of Flagship Hotels, the hotel division of American Airlines. The property was renamed the Ala Moana Americana in 1972, following American Airlines' acquisition of Americana Hotels. In 1986, co-owners Dillingham Corp. and Pick-Americana Hotels of Dallas sold the hotel to the Japan-based Azabu USA for $70 million. Azabu subsequently invested $31 million in renovations and engaged Ramada Renaissance Hotels to manage the property, which was rebranded as the Ramada Renaissance Ala Moana Hotel.

In 2004, Azabu sold the hotel for $85 million to Crescent Heights, a Miami-based condominium developer. Crescent Heights converted approximately 800 of the hotel's 1,154 rooms into condominium units, selling them for approximately $200,000 each. Outrigger Hotels assumed management of the hotel portion in 2006, though the property did not adopt the Outrigger name. In 2016, Outrigger sold its interest in the hotel to the Australia-based Mantra Group for $52.5 million.

The 38-story Ala Moana Hotel stands at a height of 120.7 m (396 ft) and contains a total of 1,176 rooms.

It should not be confused with the Moana Surfrider Hotel, which was built approximately 70 years earlier.

== Architecture ==
The Ala Moana Hotel was recognized by the Building Industry Association of Hawaii as a 2006 Parade of Homes standout.

== See also ==
- List of tallest buildings in Honolulu
