= 690 Pohukaina =

Unbuilt 60-story residential skyscraper in Kakaʻako, Honolulu, Hawaii

General information
- Status: Never built
- Type: Residential
- Location: 690 Pohukaina St, Kakaʻako, Honolulu, Hawaii
- Coordinates: 21°17′58.9″N 157°51′32.8″W
- Construction started: Never
- Completed: Never
- Cost: $500,000,000

Height
- Roof: 198.1 m (650 ft)

Technical details
- Floor count: 60

Design and construction
- Architecture firm: Benjamin Woo Architects
- Developer: Forest City Hawaii

690 Pohukaina is an unbuilt skyscraper located in the Kakaʻako district of Honolulu, Hawaii. Originally planned as a 60-story residential skyscraper standing at a height of 198.1 m (650 ft), it was projected to become the tallest building in the state, surpassing Hawaii's current tallest building, the Century Center, which stands at 151.5 m (497 ft).

Furthermore, the proposed skyscraper would have become the tallest building in the entire region of the Polynesian Triangle, surpassing Seascape in Auckland, New Zealand, which stands at 187.2 m (614 ft). However, the ambitious development ultimately did not move forward as originally conceived and was replaced by alternative plans due to regulatory shifts and height restrictions in the Kakaʻako district.

== History ==
Designed by the Hawaii-based architectural firm Benjamin Woo Architects, the project began as a prominent transit-oriented development proposal in the Kakaʻako district of Honolulu, Hawaii, in October 2011. Initial master planning envisioned a landmark mixed-use complex centered around high-density residential towers. The conceptual design featured a towering residential skyscraper planned to reach 198.1 m (650 ft) across 60 floors.

In early 2012, the Hawaii Community Development Authority officially issued a request for proposals for developers to bid on the site. By late 2012, the developer Forest City Hawaii was selected through this competitive process, and the project was officially approved. Construction was expected to begin in 2014, with the second tower scheduled to follow in 2015. Full project completion was targeted for 2019.

As the proposal advanced, it faced public scrutiny and regulatory hurdles regarding the sheer scale of the high-rise. Local planning authorities raised questions about neighborhood infrastructure capacity, while strict regional height limits enforced by regulatory bodies created significant boundaries for the original design.

Due to these mounting constraints and changing development parameters, the initial high-rise vision was eventually cancelled in its original form in 2016. The design was deemed unviable under existing urban planning guidelines, forcing developers to abandon the tall structure.

Following the cancellation of the original concept, the initiative was restructured to prioritize regional housing needs. The redesigned project was scaled back to comply with local height regulations and neighborhood integration goals, reducing the planned structure to a 127.4 m (418 ft), 39-story skyscraper that eventually moved forward under the name Pohukaina Commons.

== See also ==
- Hawaiian architecture
- List of tallest buildings in Honolulu
