= Ala Moana Center =

Shopping mall in Honolulu, Hawaii, US

- Location: Ala Moana, Honolulu, Hawaii, US
- Coordinates: 21°17′28″N 157°50′37″W
- Address: 1450 Ala Moana Boulevard
- Opened: August 13, 1959; 67 years ago
- Developer: Don Graham
- Manager: GGP
- Owner: GGP
- Num. of stores: 350
- Num. of anchor tenants: 5 (4 open, 1 closed)
- Floor area: c. 2,400,000 square feet (220,000 m^{2})
- Floors: 4
- Parking: 11,000
- Website: alamoanacenter.com

The Ala Moana Center, often simply called Ala Moana, is a large open-air shopping mall in the Ala Moana neighborhood of Honolulu, Hawaii. Owned by GGP, a subsidiary of Brookfield Properties, Ala Moana is the eighth largest shopping mall in the United States and the largest open-air shopping center in the world.

Ala Moana is consistently ranked among the most successful malls in the world. With assets totaling $5.74 billion as of January 2018, it is the most valuable shopping mall in the United States. It is anchored by Bloomingdale's, Macy's, Nordstrom, and Target. There is one vacant anchor formerly occupied by Neiman Marcus. Junior anchors are Marshalls and Ross Dress for Less. The mall also features stores and restaurants such as Uniqlo, Liliha Bakery, and Foodland, along with services such as a satellite city hall and USPS post office.

== History ==
Before the construction of the mall, the land was a wetland. Dredging projects nearby spearheaded by Walter F. Dillingham created excess coral which filled the wetland, purchased by Dillingham in 1912 from the estate of Bernice Pauahi Bishop. Land reclaimed, son and successor Lowell Dillingham initiated the Ala Moana Center project in 1948 and broke ground in 1957.

=== Initial development and design ===
The Ala Moana Center was developed and designed by Don Graham. Critics viewed Graham's unusual design, which oriented the mall away from the Pacific Ocean and included two levels for retail and parking, as a potential failure. However, the Ala Moana Center proved a success after its opening, and helped refocus the retail center of Oʻahu away from Downtown Honolulu. Graham worked as the center's first general manager after its opening.

=== Opening ===
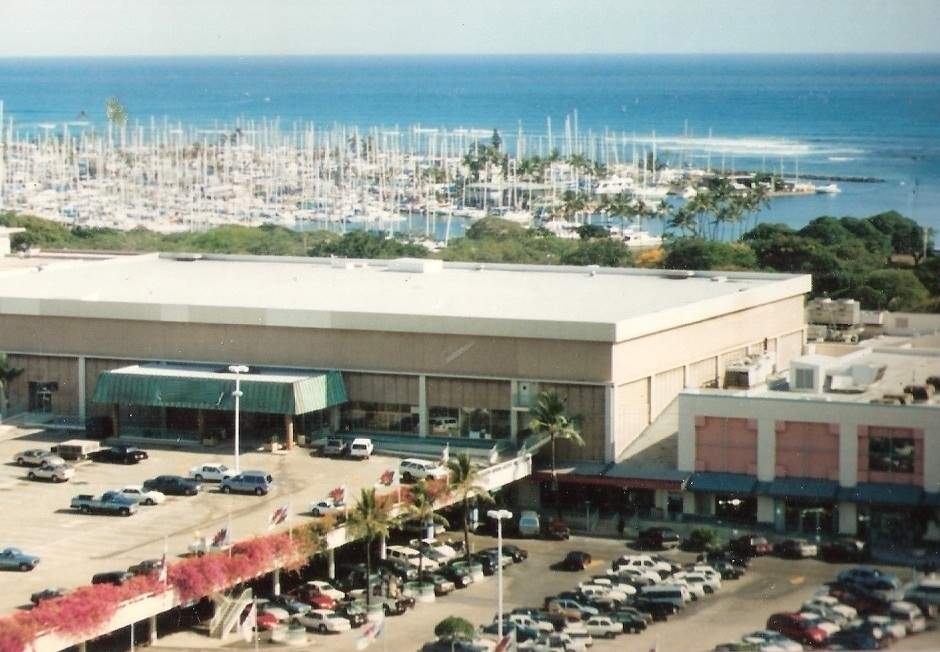
JCPenney store at Ala Moana, 1996. This area was heavily altered by expansions in the 2000s.

When it opened in 1959, Ala Moana Center became the largest shopping mall in the United States. Brookfield Properties of Chicago currently owns and operates Ala Moana Center. Although later retail developments across the nation have overshadowed it over the years, Brookfield markets and lists Ala Moana Center as the world's largest open-air mall with a total retail space of 2,270,186 sq ft (210,907.2 m^{2}). Its original tenants included Sears, Roebuck and Company, F. W. Woolworth Company, Foodland, Longs Drugs, and Shirokiya, among other local shops. Ala Moana Center's second-phase expansion included the 1961 addition of the Ala Moana Office Building (including La Ronde, the first revolving restaurant in the United States), and the 1966 addition of JCPenney and Liberty House in a new Diamond Head wing. In 1982, Ala Moana Center was purchased by a partnership of Japanese corporation Daiei and an insurance company. In 1995, Daiei became the sole owner. Once a management vendor for Daiei, General Growth Properties purchased Ala Moana Center in 1999 after Daiei filed for Chapter 11 Bankruptcy.

=== Success and expansion ===
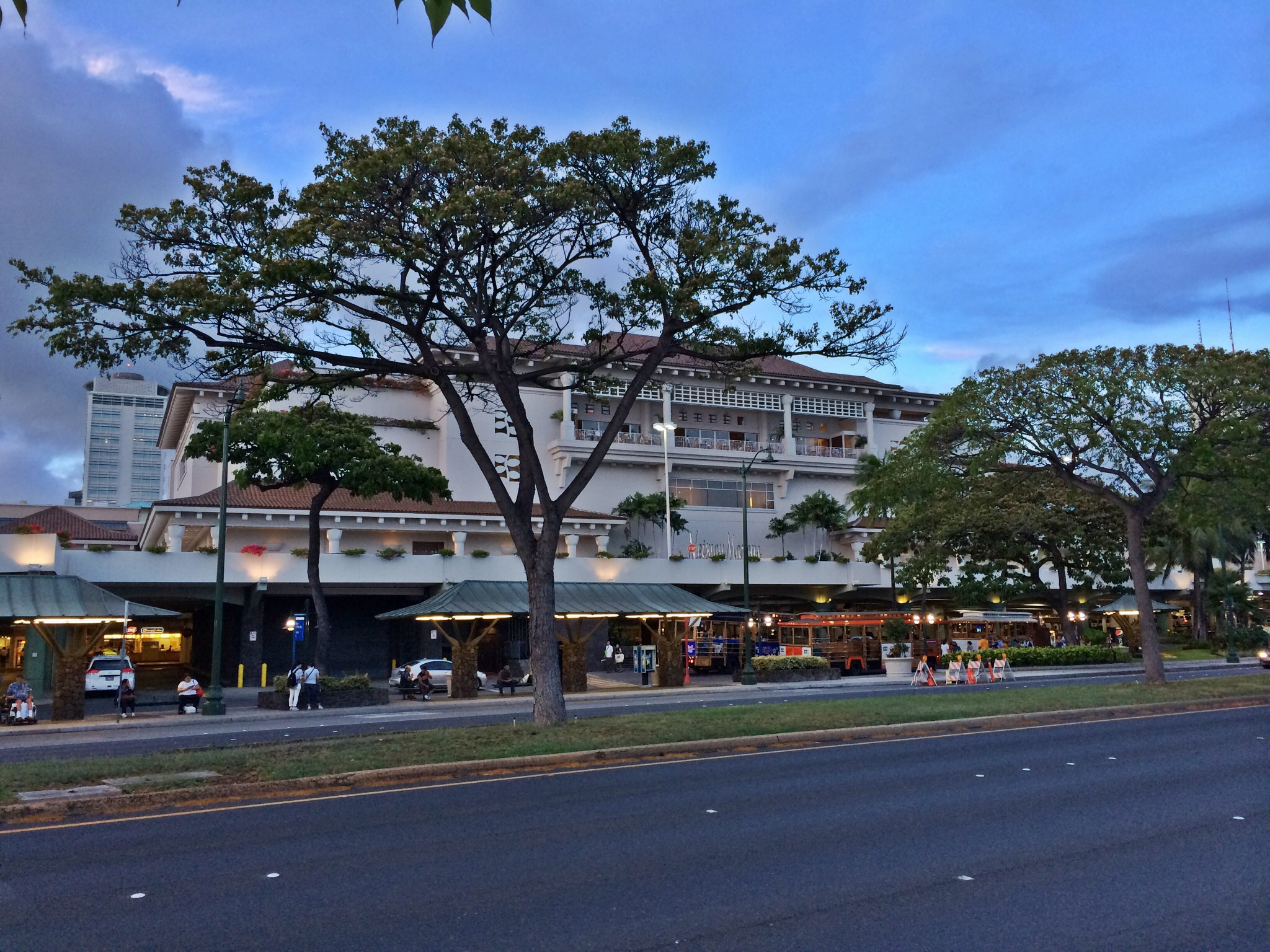
Neiman Marcus store at Ala Moana Center, 2014

The Phase Three expansion in 1987 included renovations and the addition of the Makai Market food court. In 1990, Phase Four constructed a third level of retail in the middle of the mall, reconfiguring the central area with high-end luxury stores. Phase Five added Neiman Marcus as a new anchor in 1998 and spaces for more than 30 stores and restaurants in further upper level expansions in 1999. It was closed temporary for September 11 2001 because of that days attacks

In 2003, JCPenney Co. closed its Hawaii stores in a cost-cutting measure, including its Ala Moana location that had been an anchor in the mall since 1966. The department store's four-level space was divided up and redeveloped into new stores. In 2005, the Ho‘okipa Terrace opened above the former JCPenney space; this vertical expansion added a fourth mall level containing restaurants and an open air bar.

A shopping complex and parking spaces north of the mall to Kapi‘olani Boulevard were demolished in 2006 to make way for the Mauka wing, which was completed on March 7, 2008. The Mauka wing added a dual level concourse lined with specialty merchants and was originally anchored by a 210,000 sq ft (20,000 m^{2}) Nordstrom.

In a June 26, 2009 report from U.S. News & World Report, Ala Moana was ranked as the second most profitable mall in America based on sales per square footage, and also had one of the highest occupancy rates, at 95%. The report described the flourishing mall as a gold mine, with annual sales of more than $1 billion.

=== Departure of Sears ===
On February 23, 2012, Sears Holdings Corporation announced it would close its store at Ala Moana Center by early 2013. Sears held its original location and had a presence at the mall since its opening in 1959. The closing was part of a $270 million sale of 11 Sears properties nationwide. The Wall Street Journal estimated that the Ala Moana Sears location was the largest portion of the deal, comprising between $200 million to $250 million of the overall sale price. The Ala Moana location closed permanently at 7 PM on June 2, 2013.

=== Ewa Wing expansion ===
On May 17, 2013, the owner of Ala Moana Center announced that Bloomingdale's would anchor and occupy 167,000 sq ft (15,500 m^{2}) of a new and expanded 650,000 sq ft (60,000 m^{2}) Ewa wing. The expanded wing opened on November 12, 2015, replacing the existing wing on the western end of the mall, including the space previously occupied by Sears. The new wing was anchored by Bloomingdale's and Nordstrom, which relocated from the Mauka wing. On October 22, 2017, Target held its grand opening for its first store at a mall in Hawaii in the former Nordstrom location.

On March 6, 2026, Saks Global announced the closure of 12 Saks Fifth Avenue and 3 Neiman Marcus locations nationwide in an effort to further cut costs and focus on more profitable locations, including the Neiman Marcus store at Ala Moana Center.

== Architecture and layout ==
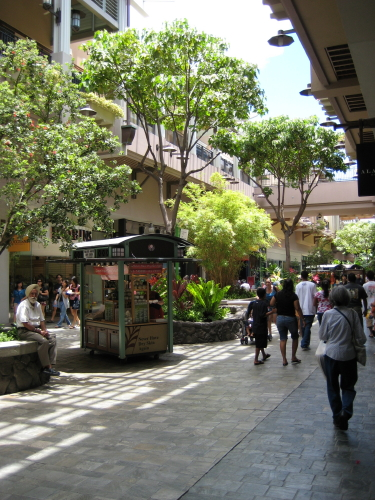
Central promenade of the Ala Moana Center, 2007

Costing US $25 million in 1959, Ala Moana Center had 87 stores and 4,000 parking spaces when it opened that year. It was remodeled extensively in various phases. New designs reflected modern Hawaiian architectural principles, emphasizing the importance of the symbolism of various natural phenomena found in Hawaiʻi. Asian Pacific Rim motifs have been adopted reflecting the large Asian population of residents in Hawaiʻi. For examples, for decades a centerpiece of Ala Moana Center was its koi ponds; in the Japanese culture, koi represent happiness and tranquility.

Despite these enhancements, the design of the center has been criticized for its overbuilt appearance and hodgepodge architecture, which was the result of years of modifications and expansions under different owners. Still, Ala Moana Center architecture and layouts inspired its owner in 2004 to invest over US $1 billion in remodeling various other shopping centers across Canada and the United States, using Ala Moana Center as a template. As of 2018, Ala Moana is valued at nearly $6 billion and is the largest outdoor mall in the world.

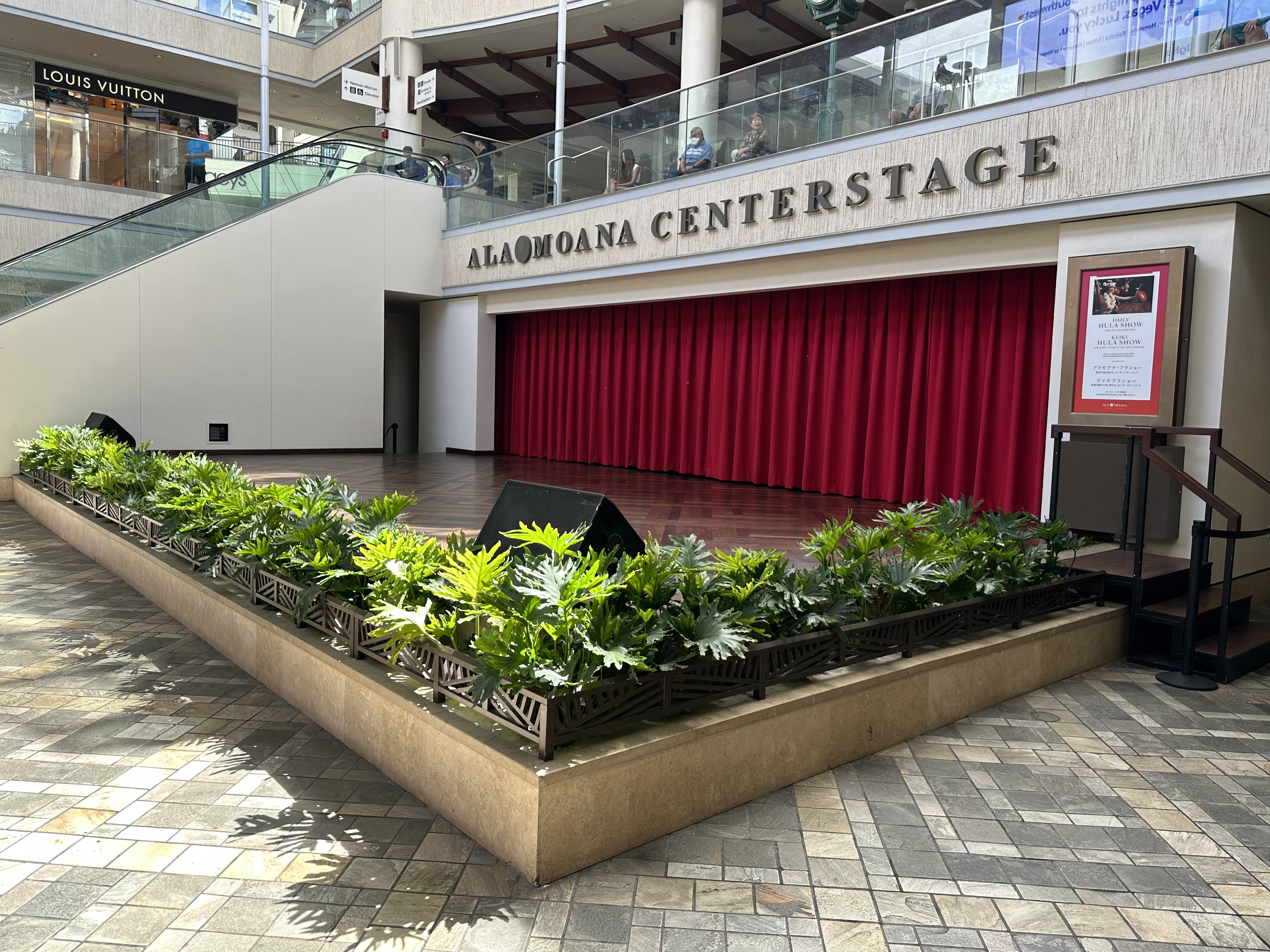
Ala Moana Centerstage, 2023

Ala Moana Centerstage, a stage in the center of the shopping complex, is one of the most popular public amphitheaters in Hawaiʻi. Local talents are showcased on the stage for visitors to enjoy. Hula dances are a staple for Ala Moana Centerstage as well as performances by the Royal Hawaiian Band, the oldest municipal band in the United States. Schools throughout the world travel to Honolulu just to perform at Ala Moana Centerstage. In addition, episodes of the local TV show Hawaii Stars, a singing competition, are usually filmed on the stage; onlookers can usually be seen crowding the second- and third-story balconies overlooking the stage during taping.

== See also ==
- List of largest shopping malls in the world
- List of largest shopping malls in the United States
- Kahala Mall
- Pearlridge
- Windward Mall
