= First Hawaiian Center =

Third-tallest building in the U.S. state of Hawaiʻi

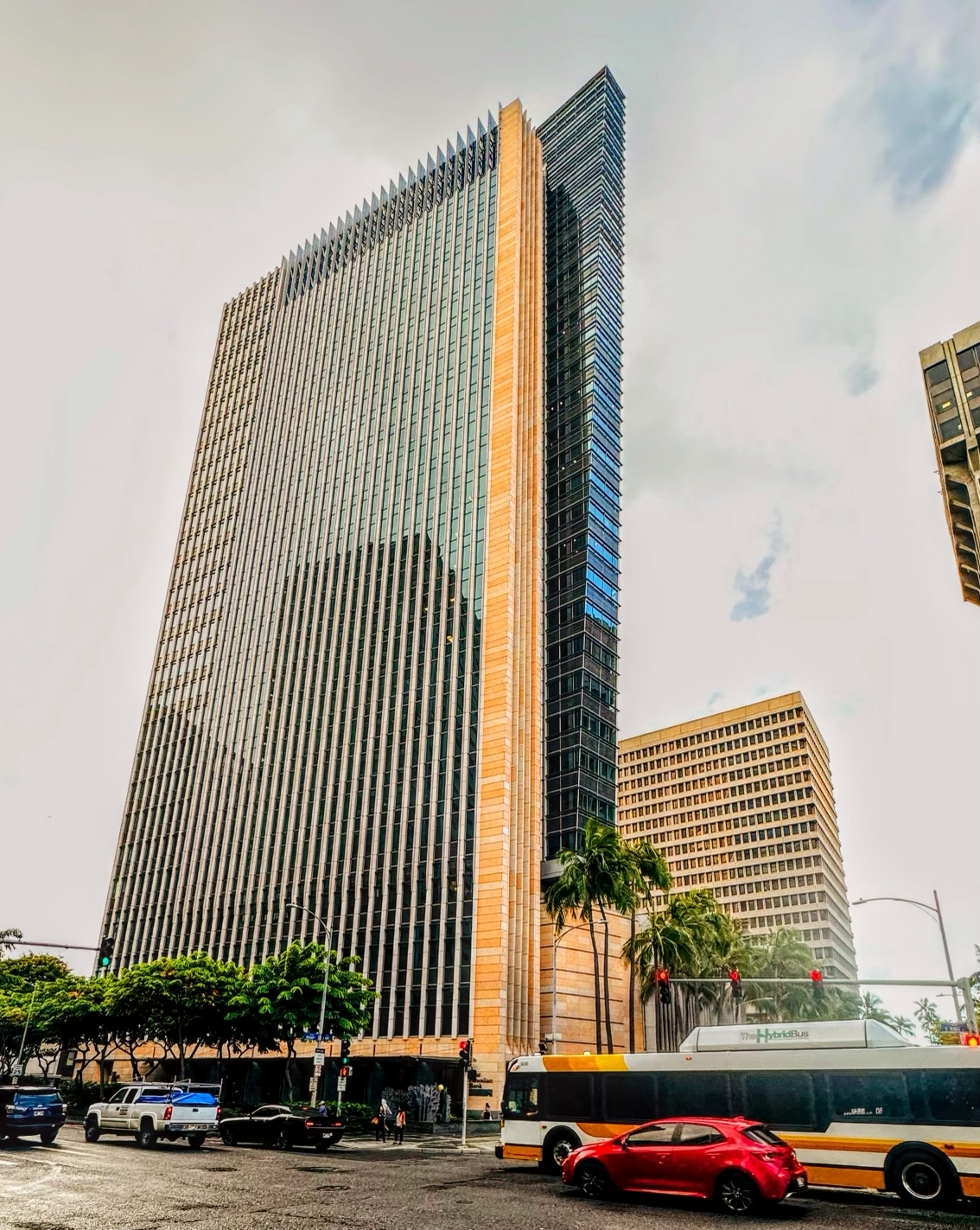

General information
- Status: Completed
- Type: Office
- Location: 999 Bishop Street; Honolulu, HI 96813
- Coordinates: 21°18′28.3″N 157°51′41.7″W
- Construction started: 1993
- Completed: 1996
- Opening: 1996
- Cost: US$175 million
- Owner: First Hawaiian Bank

Height
- Roof: 429 feet (131 m)

Technical details
- Floor count: 30
- Floor area: 645,834 square feet (59,999.9 m^{2})

Design and construction
- Architect: Kohn Pedersen Fox
- Developer: Myers Corporation

First Hawaiian Center is the third-tallest building in the U.S. state of Hawaiʻi and the city of Honolulu, the largest city in the state. It is the world corporate headquarters of First Hawaiian Bank, the oldest and largest bank based in Hawaiʻi. The tower is one of the most well-known buildings in Honolulu, with a striking presence at the center of downtown Honolulu's skyline.

== Description ==
Located at 999 Bishop Street in downtown Honolulu near Bishop Park, the First Hawaiian Center is the world corporate headquarters of First Hawaiian Bank, Hawaiʻi's oldest bank and multibillion-dollar company established by Charles Reed Bishop, consort of Princess Bernice Pauahi Bishop.

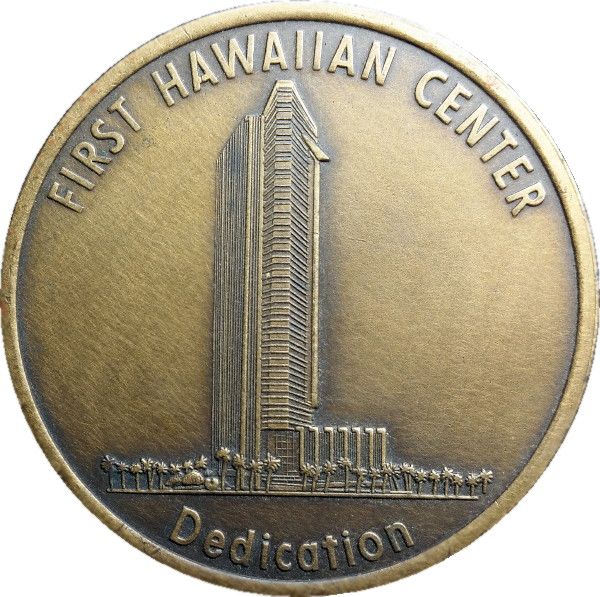
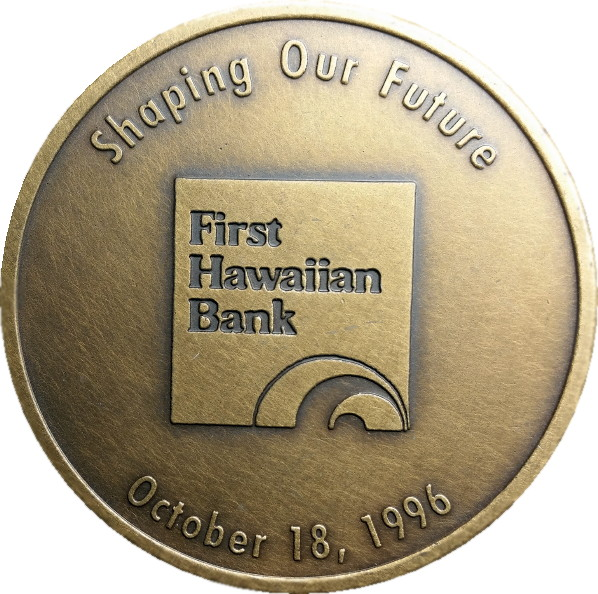
First Hawaiian Center dedication medal

First Hawaiian Center features the 24,000 square feet (2,200 m^{2}) of open plaza, park space and waterways in the middle of downtown Honolulu's financial district cityscape of towering commercial buildings and congested streets. It is within walking distance of the Aliʻiōlani Hale, Cathedral of Our Lady of Peace, Hawaiʻi State Capitol and ʻIolani Palace. Considered a "unique marriage of commerce and the arts," First Hawaiian Center features three galleries programmed by the Honolulu Museum of Art. (The gallery spaces were formerly curated by The Contemporary Museum, Honolulu). The gallery exhibits works by Hawaii-based artists.

The First Hawaiian Center is home to the Innovation Center Pacific.

== Development ==
First Hawaiian Center was completed and opened in 1996 by chairman and chief executive officer of First Hawaiian Bank Walter A. Dods. With over 645,834 square feet (60,000 m^{2}) of space and a height of 429 feet (131 m), the building cost over USD $175 million to construct. The architects were from the firm Kohn Pedersen Fox Associates.

== Architecture ==
First Hawaiian Center planning was met with controversy as Hawaiʻi residents became concerned about the effect skyscrapers would have on the Hawaiian landscape. Architects compromised with the use of Hawaiian architectural principles used in most contemporary Honolulu urban projects like those employed by architects of the Hawaiʻi Convention Center. Metaphoric designs were used in reference to natural phenomena found in Hawaiʻi.

Two distinct architectural forms resulted in the compromise, one for the makai side facing the ocean and one for the mauka side facing the mountains. Horizontally louvered windows framed views of the sea and the horizon while vertically proportioned windows faced the mountains. A great deal of effort was made to incorporate as much natural light as possible into the building interiors.

== See also ==
- List of tallest buildings by U.S. state
- List of tallest buildings in Honolulu
