= Kahala Mall =

Shopping mall in Honolulu, Hawaii

- Location: Kahala, Hawaii, United States
- Coordinates: 21°16′37″N 157°47′10.5″W
- Opened: November 1954
- Developer: Philip Lyon, Gordon & Company (E. Philip Lyon and Sheldon Gordon
- Manager: MMI Realty, Inc.
- Num. of stores: 98
- Num. of anchor tenants: 5
- Floor area: 414,000 square feet (38,500 m^{2})
- Floors: 1 with partial upper level (2 in Macy's)

Kahala Mall is an indoor shopping mall in the Kāhala neighborhood of Honolulu, Hawaii on the east side of the island of Oahu. In addition to its service as a major shopping center, Kahala Mall also serves as a key stop on a number of TheBus routes. It is located on Waialae Avenue, near the end of Interstate H-1, where it becomes Kalanianaole Highway.

== History ==
Opening in November 1954 as Waialae Shopping Center, it was renovated in 1969-1970 by Philip Lyon, Gordon and Company and became known as Kahala Mall. It once included the first F.W. Woolworth Company dime store in Hawaii. Waialae Bowl, the only bowling center within several miles of the neighborhood, at one time operated at the mall, but has since closed.

On March 31, 2006, a flood hit the mall. Water affected an estimated 60 of 90 mall businesses, and knocked down two movie auditorium walls.

== Tenants ==
Kahala Mall is home to a number of notable businesses, including CVS Pharmacy (doing business as Longs Drugs), Whole Foods Market, Claire's, Apple Store, Macy's (formerly Liberty House), Ross Dress for Less, Starbucks, Jamba Juice, GameStop, Chili's and California Pizza Kitchen, and Sephora. The mall also houses a movie theatre, Consolidated Theatres.

== Clientele ==
Local senior citizen residents frequent the mall during its early morning hours in order to partake in one of the many free exercise programs that are offered. Students of all ages are regularly found in the mall during and after business hours; they are free to socialize or use laptop computers at any one of the compound's numerous gathering areas.

A notable client was actor Jack Lord of Hawaii Five-O fame, who would take walks in the mall during his later years. A bronzed bust of Lord sits outside the mall, near the California Pizza Kitchen entrance.
