= Ala Moana, Honolulu =

Neighborhood of Honolulu, Hawaii, US

Coordinates: 21.291852°N 157.843565°W

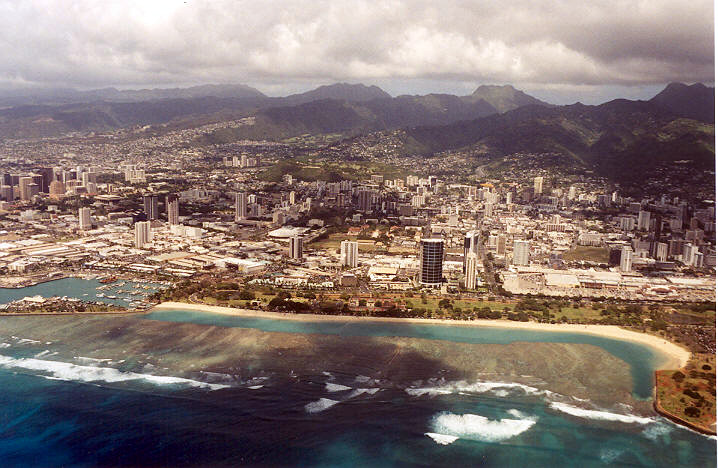
Ala Moana stretches from Honolulu Harbor to Waikiki and is home to Ala Moana Center, once the largest shopping center in the United States and today the largest open air shopping center in the world.

Ala Moana (meaning path to the sea in Hawaiian) is a commercial, retail, and residential district of Honolulu, Hawaii. It is located between Waikīkī and Mōʻiliʻili to the east, and Kakaʻako and Honolulu Harbor to the west. King Street, to the north, marks the border with the neighborhood of Makiki.

Ala Moana is situated along the southern shores of the island of Oʻahu and features a vast stretch of reef-protected white sandy beaches. The main roads through Ala Moana are Ala Moana Boulevard and Kapiʻolani Boulevard. Ala Moana is a major transfer point in Honolulu's bus system. Across the street from Ala Moana Center is Ala Moana Beach Park, dedicated by President Franklin D. Roosevelt in the 1930s.

The civic center of Ala Moana is Ala Moana Center, once the largest shopping center in the United States and currently the largest open-air shopping center in the world. The shopping center was developed by Don Graham and opened August 13, 1959.

The area is currently experiencing residential and retail growth in addition to the shopping center.

== History ==
The ancient Hawaiian name for the area was Kālia. It originally included many fishponds, taro fields, swamps, and residences for the fishermen. The land was held as Hawaiian Government property and sold in 1861 to Lot Kamehameha. The parcel later passed into Bernice Pauahi Bishop's holdings and later became part of the Bishop Estate which put the parcel up for sale around the time of Bernice Pauahi Bishop's death in 1884. It was sold to Walter F. Dillingham in 1912 for $30,000. Dillingham established the Hawaiian Dredging Company in 1902 to build harbors along his father's OR&L Co.’s lines and, shortly thereafter, won the U.S. Navy contract to dredge the entrance channel to Pearl Harbor. The parcel of land in Kālia provided a dumping spot for excess fill from dredging Pearl Harbor, creating the opportunity for future development.

Honolulu's 1939-1944 master plan had zoned the property for hotels and apartments with a street grid through the site. A 1949 feasibility survey by Skidmore, Owings & Merrill convinced the developer, the Hawaiian Land Company, a newly formed subsidiary company of the Hawaiian Dredging Company headed by Walter Dillingham's son Lowell, to request a change in zoning in order to develop the property into a shopping center. The study, prior to the construction of most of the island's shopping centers, had found that urban Honolulu was underserved by retail outlets and that parking had become difficult in the downtown shopping area.

== Gallery ==
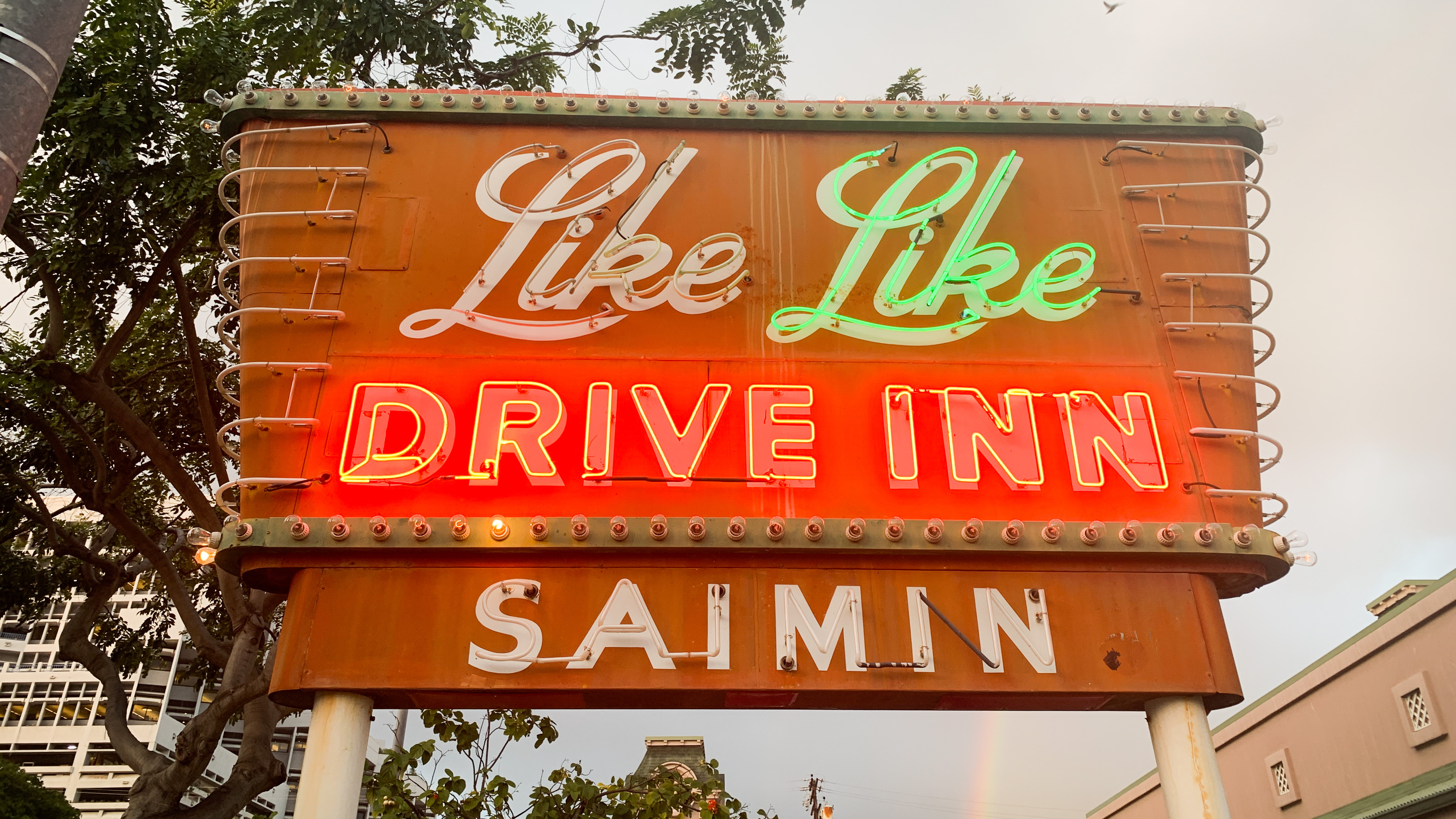
The Like Like Drive Inn, a staple of Ala Moana neighborhood since 1953 closed in 2020 (during the COVID-19 pandemic)

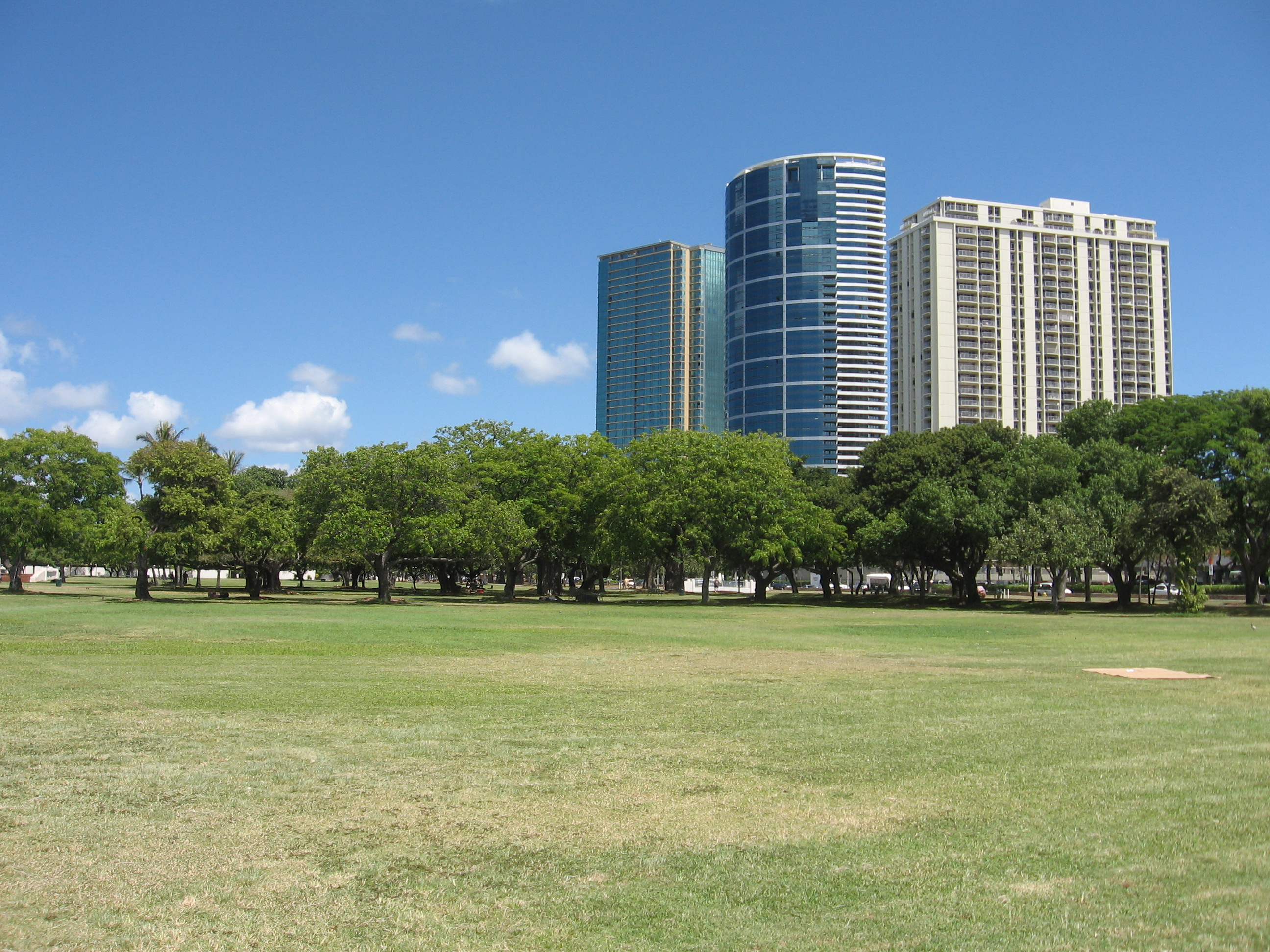
New high rise buildings tower over Ala Moana Beach Park
