= Swineford Lock =

Canal lock in Gloucestershire, England

Coordinates: 51.41827°N 2.44575°W

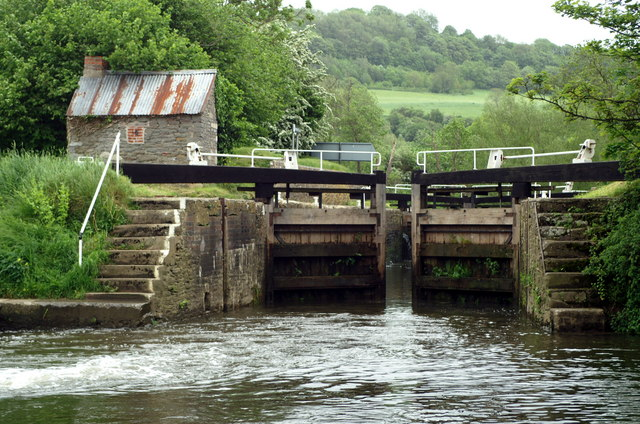
Swineford lock

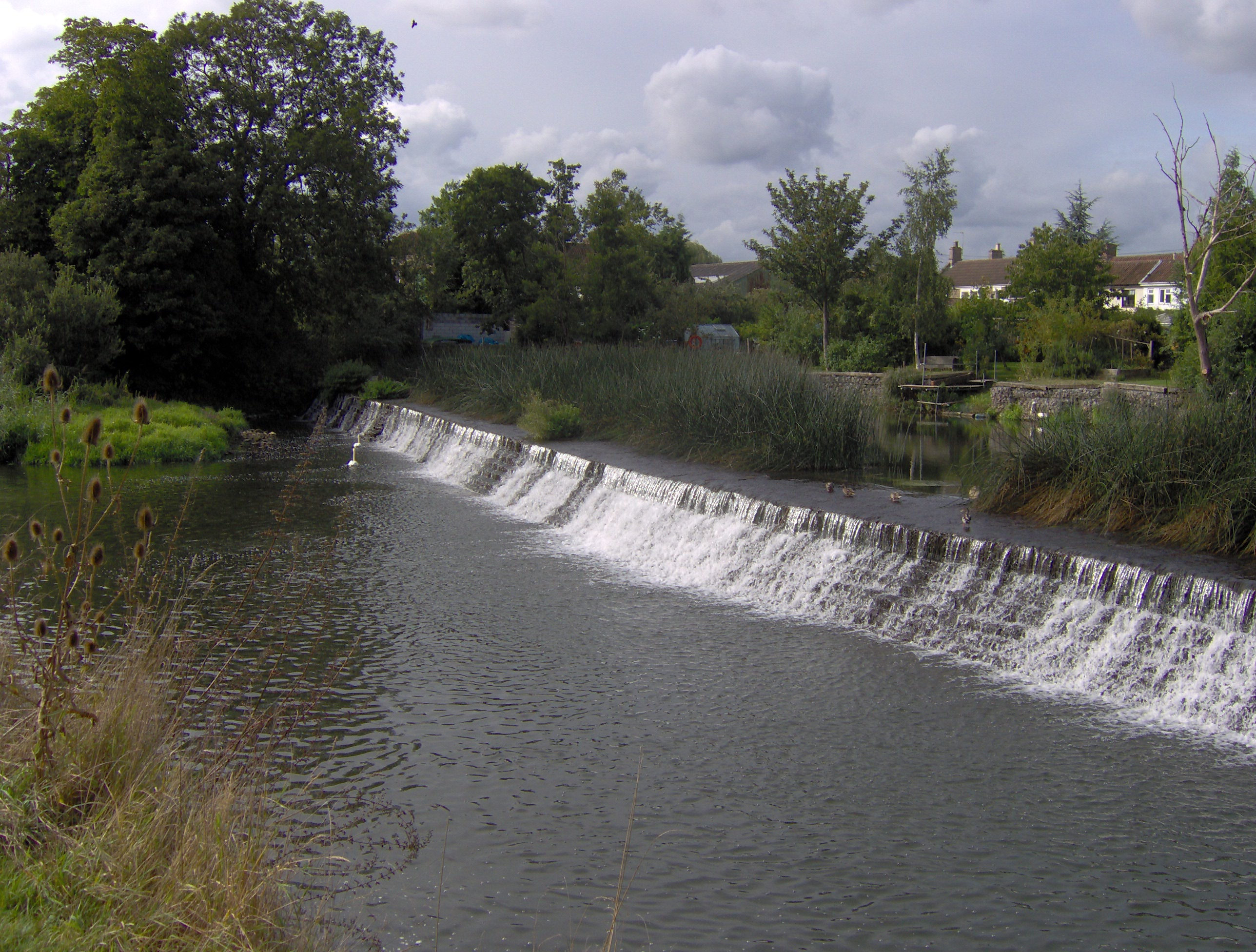
Weir at Swineford

Swineford Lock is a canal lock situated on the River Avon, at the village of Swineford, England.

The Bristol Avon Navigation, which runs the 15 miles (24 km) from the Kennet and Avon Canal at Hanham Lock to the Bristol Channel at Avonmouth, was constructed between 1724 and 1727, following legislation passed by Queen Anne, by a company of proprietors and the engineer John Hore of Newbury. The first cargo of 'Deal boards, Pig-Lead and Meal' arrived in Bath in December 1727. The navigation is now administered by the Canal & River Trust.

In its heyday, between 1709 and 1859 Swineford had an active brass and copper industry which were served by the river which also provided water power for the cloth industry. The mill was later converted into a flock mill.

== See also ==
- Locks on the Kennet and Avon Canal

Next lock upstream	River Avon, Bristol / Kennet and Avon Canal	Next lock downstream
Saltford Lock	Swineford Lock; Grid reference: ST691689	Keynsham Lock
