= Kelston Lock =

Canal lock in England

Coordinates: 51.4006°N 2.4488°W

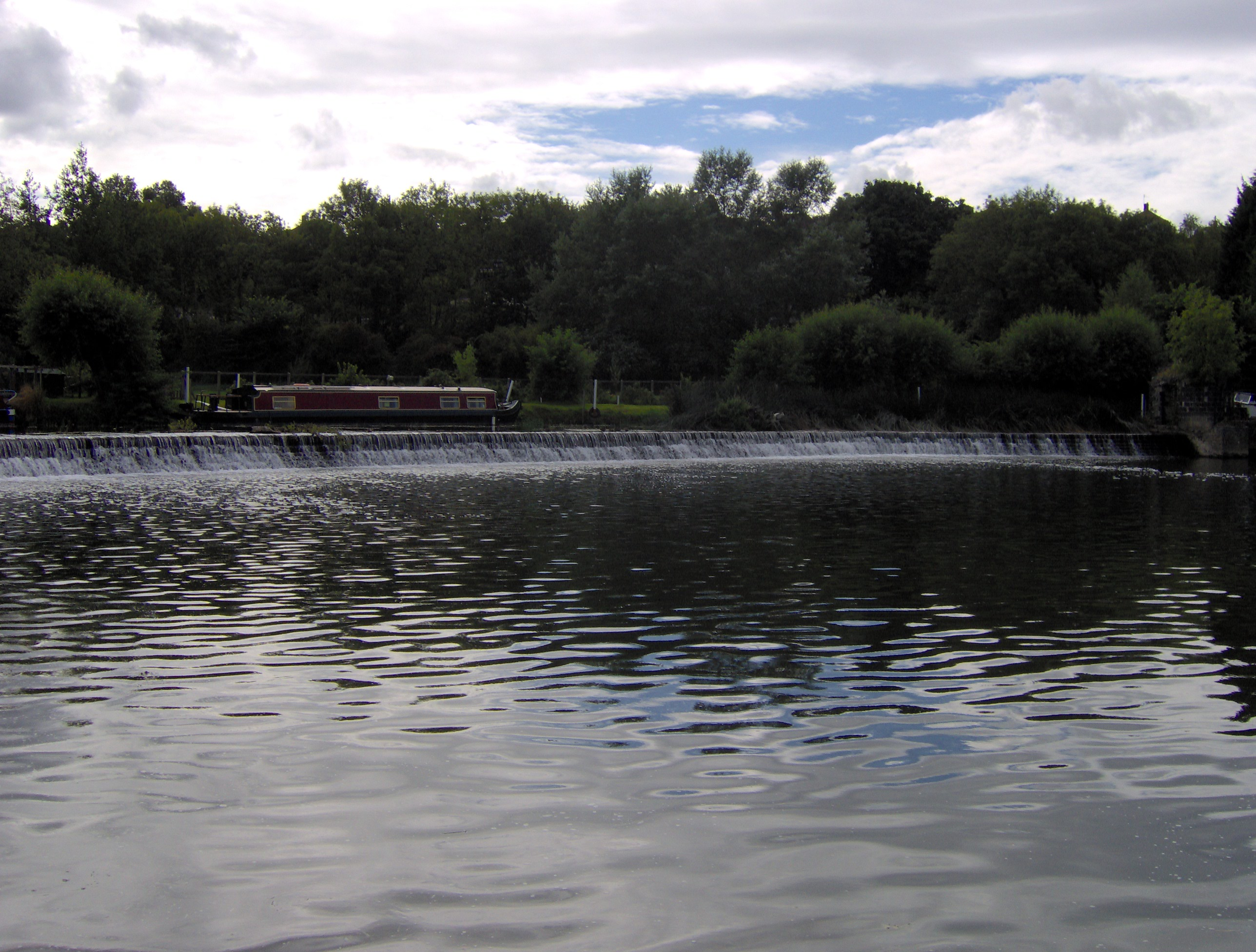
The weir at Kelston lock

Kelston Lock is a canal lock situated on the River Avon, between the villages of Kelston and Saltford, between Bristol and Bath, England.

The Bristol Avon Navigation, which runs the 15 miles (24 km) from the Kennet and Avon Canal at Hanham Lock to the Bristol Channel at Avonmouth, was constructed between 1724 and 1727, following legislation passed by Queen Anne, by a company of proprietors and the engineer John Hore of Newbury. The first cargo of 'Deal boards, Pig-Lead and Meal' arrived in Bath in December 1727. The navigation is now administered by the Canal & River Trust.

Above and below the lock and weir are permanent moorings. The Riverside Inn and Saltford Marina are also close by.

A branch of the river runs behind "Brass Mill Island", named for the annealing ovens of the former brass mill. The mill closed in the 1840s.

== See also ==
- Locks on the Kennet and Avon Canal

Next lock upstream	River Avon, Bristol / Kennet and Avon Canal	Next lock downstream
Weston Lock	Kelston Lock; Grid reference: ST688669	Saltford Lock
