= Saltford Lock =

Canal lock on the River Avon, England

Coordinates: 51.40966°N 2.44314°W

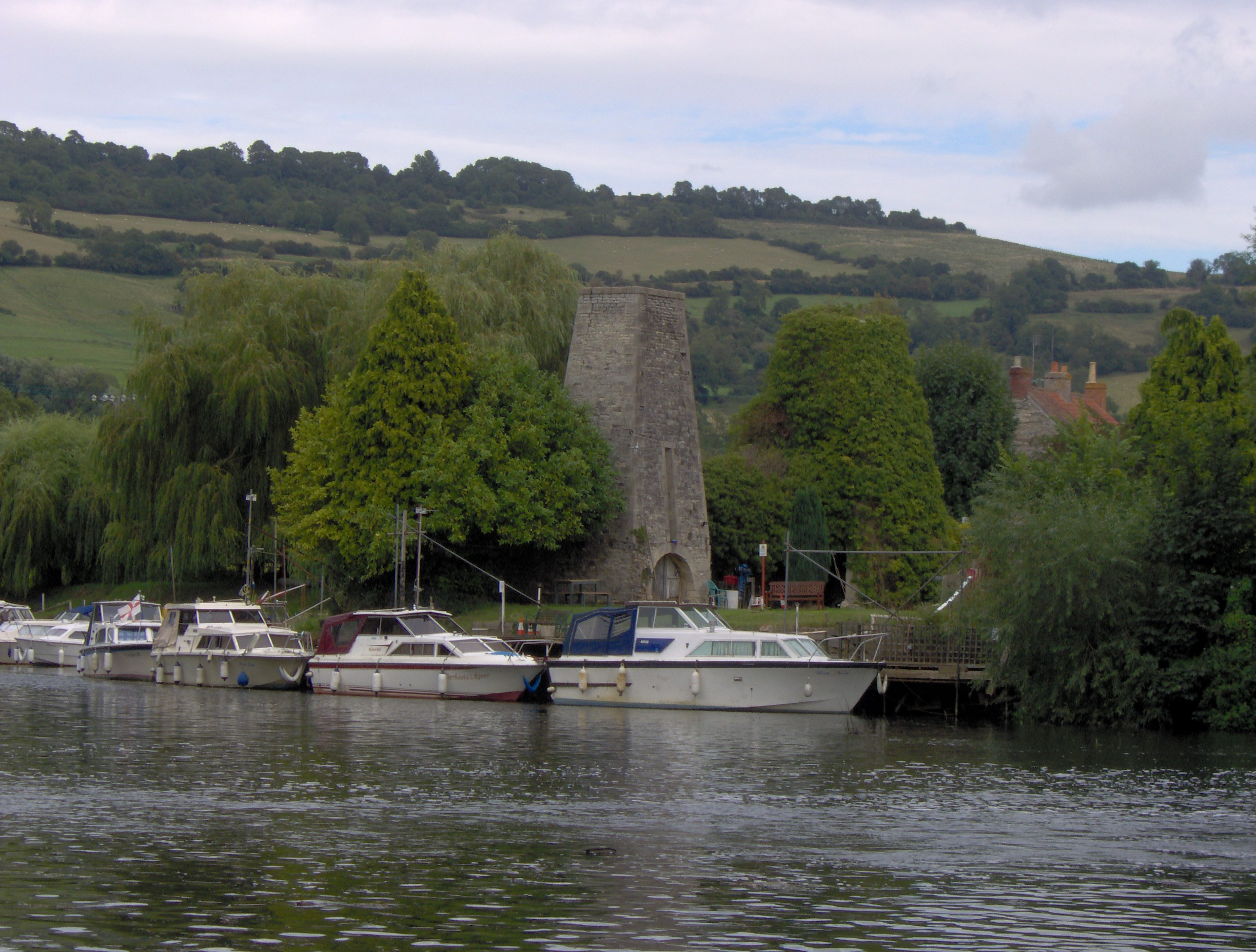
Saltford Brass Mill overlooking Saltford lock

Saltford Lock is a canal lock situated on the River Avon, at the village of Saltford, between Bristol and Bath, England.

The Bristol Avon Navigation, which runs the 15 miles (24 km) from the Kennet and Avon Canal at Hanham Lock to the Bristol Channel at Avonmouth, was constructed between 1724 and 1727, following legislation passed by Queen Anne, by a company of proprietors and the engineer John Hore of Newbury. The first cargo of 'Deal boards, Pig-Lead and Meal' arrived in Bath in December 1727. The navigation is now administered by the Canal & River Trust.

The lock and weir are overlooked by the remains of the Kelston Brass Mill, which was working until 1925. It is a grade II listed building. Alongside the lock is the Jolly Sailor pub, whose garden extends over the lock to the small island between the lock and weir. The lock was opened in 1727 and destroyed in 1738 (probably by rival coal dealers) to stop the use of the river for transportation. The pub was built in 1726 for the bargees, when the navigation opened. The wooden fireplace has holes made by newly promoted barge captains using hot pokers.

== See also ==
- Locks on the Kennet and Avon Canal

Next lock upstream	River Avon, Bristol / Kennet and Avon Canal	Next lock downstream
Kelston Lock	Saltford Lock; Grid reference ST692679	Swineford Lock
