= Heale's Lock =

Canal lock in Berkshire, England

Coordinates: 51.39296°N 1.19365°W

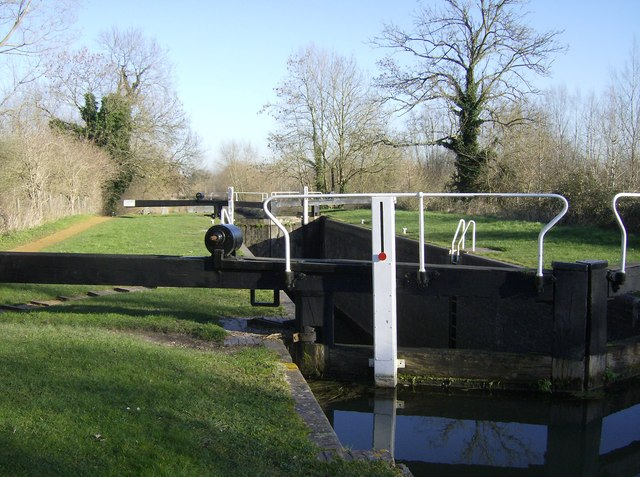
Heale's Lock

Heale's Lock is a lock on the Kennet and Avon Canal, between Thatcham and Woolhampton, Berkshire, England.

Heale's Lock was built between 1718 and 1723 under the supervision of the engineer John Hore of Newbury. The canal is administered by the Canal & River Trust. The lock has a rise/fall of 8 ft 11 in (2.72 m)., and was originally a turf lock, being rebuilt as a conventional lock in the late 1980s.

== See also ==
- Locks on the Kennet and Avon Canal

Next lock upstream	River Kennet / Kennet and Avon Canal	Next lock downstream
Midgham Lock	Heale's Lock; Grid reference: SU562663	Woolhampton Lock
