= Ufton Lock =

Canal lock in Berkshire, England

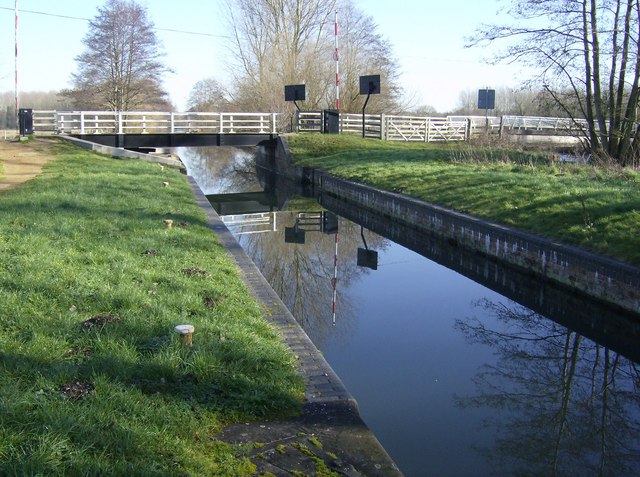
- The de-gated lock
- Interactive map of Ufton Lock
- 51°24′48″N 1°06′48″W
- Waterway: Kennet and Avon Canal
- Country: England
- County: Berkshire
- Maintained by: Canal & River Trust
- First built: c. 1834
- Length: 80 feet (24 m)
- Width: 14 feet (4.3 m)
- Fall: 0 feet 0 inches (0 m)

Ufton Lock is a degated lock on the Kennet and Avon Canal, between Padworth and Sulhamstead, Berkshire, England.

== History ==
Ufton Lock was built in c. 1834, making it the last lock on the waterway to be built. (Note: Many locks were rebuilt during the canal's restoration (some of which, such as Towney and Burghfield, were restored directly up- or downstream of their original chamber). County Lock was moved to the opposite riverbank in the 1880s.) It was engineered by John Blackwell, who had dug a new 600-yard (550 m) cut to avoid the meandering River Kennet between Padworth and Sulhamstead. The lock's depth was just 1 foot 9 inches (0.53 m), which was to improve the head of water at Towney Lock, 0.6 miles (0.97 km) upstream. When the waterway was restored in the 1960s, restoring the shallow lock was deemed unpractical and instead the rebuilt Towney Lock was deepened to cater for the difference in level. The lock gates were removed, although the chamber masonry and bollards have been retained as a landing stage for the adjacent swing bridge.

The canal is now administered by the Canal & River Trust.

== See also ==
- Locks on the Kennet and Avon Canal

Next lock upstream	River Kennet / Kennet and Avon Canal	Next lock downstream
Towney Lock	Ufton Lock; Grid reference: SU 6177 6863	Tyle Mill Lock
