= Midgham Lock =

Lock on the Kennet and Avon Canal in Berkshire, England

Coordinates: 51.39220°N 1.21378°W

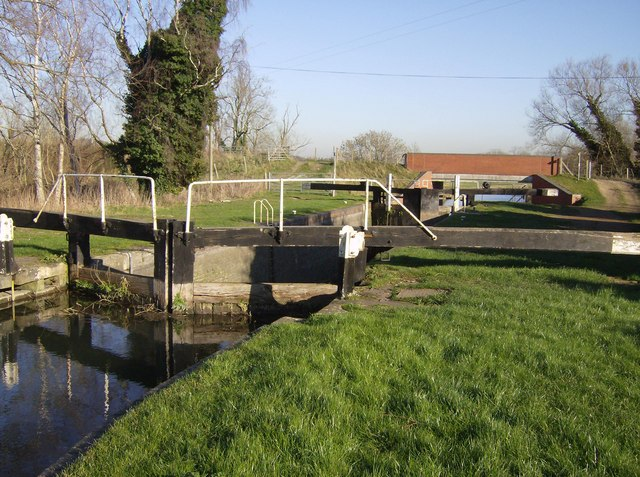
Midgham Lock, with the road bridge in the background.

Midgham Lock is a lock on the Kennet and Avon Canal, between Thatcham and Woolhampton, Berkshire, England.

Midgham Lock was built between 1718 and 1723 under the supervision of the engineer John Hore of Newbury. The canal is administered by the Canal & River Trust. The lock has a rise/fall of 7 ft 7 in (2.31 m).

== See also ==
- Locks on the Kennet and Avon Canal

Next lock upstream	River Kennet / Kennet and Avon Canal	Next lock downstream
Colthrop Lock	Midgham Lock; Grid reference: SU548662	Heale's Lock
