= Padworth Lock =

Canal lock in Padworth, Berkshire, England

Coordinates: 51.40060°N 1.13026°W

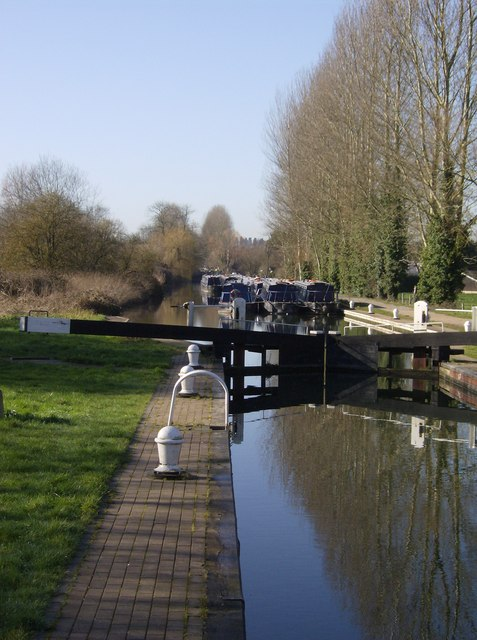
Padworth Lock is one of the many locks rebuilt from scratch during the restoration of this canal.

Padworth Lock is a lock on the Kennet and Avon Canal, at Aldermaston Wharf in the civil parish of Padworth in the English county of Berkshire.

Padworth Lock was built between 1718 and 1723 under the supervision of the engineer John Hore of Newbury, and was originally a turf-sided lock. The lock has a rise/fall of 5 ft 1 in (1.55 m)., and was totally rebuilt as a brick lock between 1982 and 1984. The canal is administered by the Canal & River Trust.

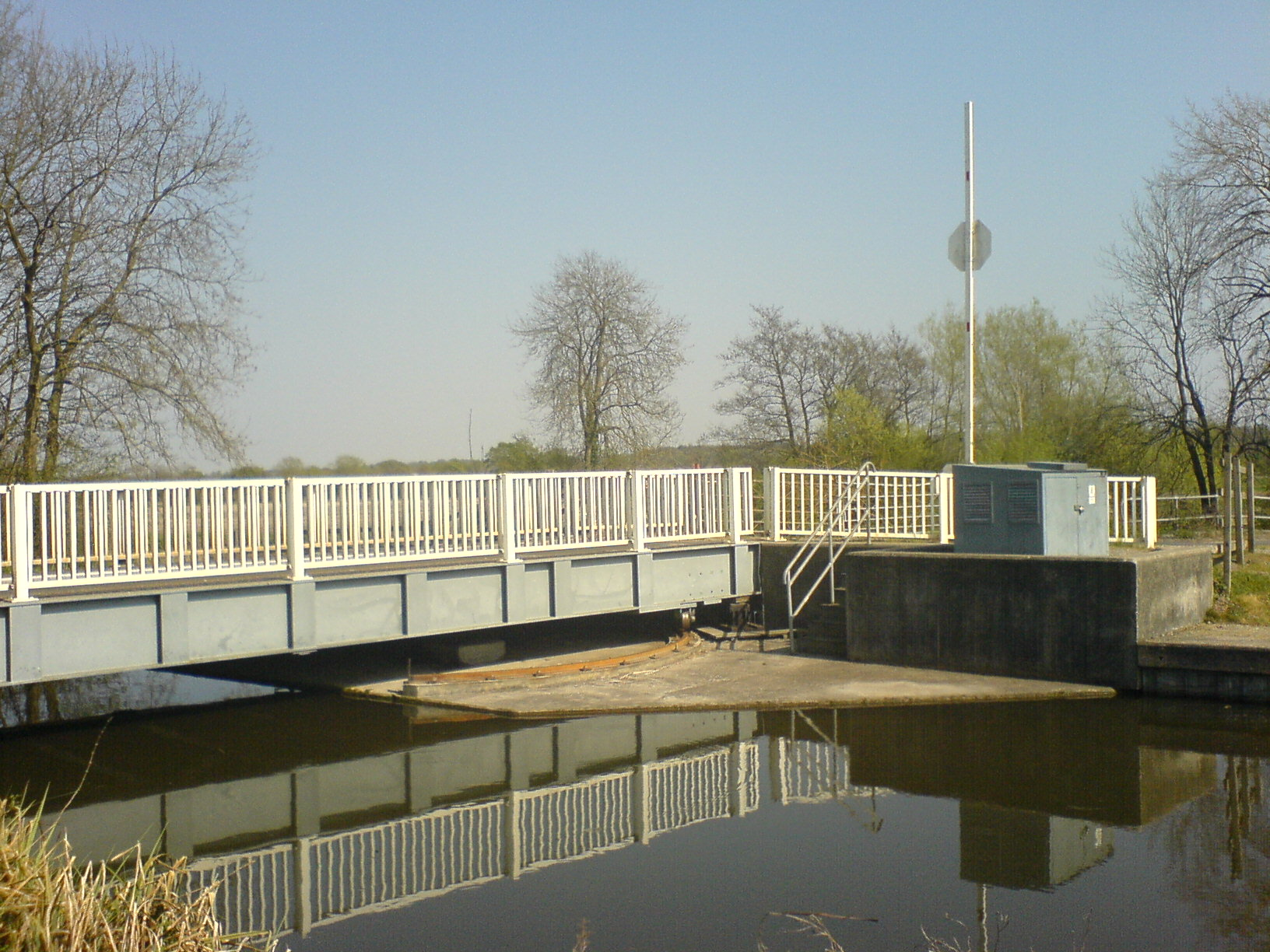
Nearby Padworth Swing Bridge

== See also ==
- Locks on the Kennet and Avon Canal

| Next lock upstream | River Kennet / Kennet and Avon Canal | Next lock downstream |
| Aldermaston Lock | Padworth Lock; Grid reference: SU606672 | Towney Lock |
