= Weston Lock =

Canal lock in Bath, England

Coordinates: 51.3827°N 2.397°W

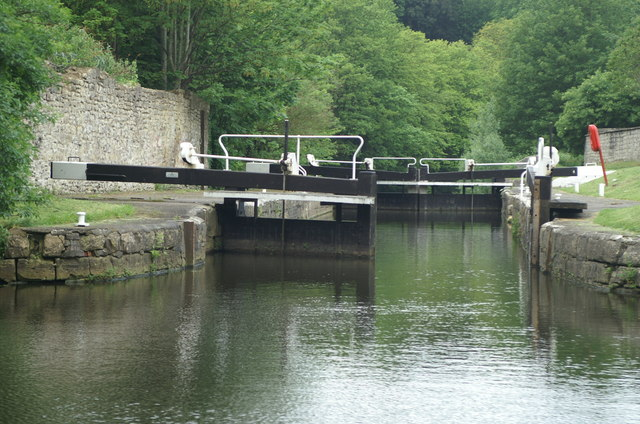
Weston Lock

Weston Lock is a canal lock situated on the River Avon, on the western outskirts of Bath, England, in what now forms the Newbridge suburb of Bath.

The Bristol Avon Navigation, which runs the 15 miles (24 km) from the Kennet and Avon Canal at Hanham Lock to the Bristol Channel at Avonmouth, was constructed between 1724 and 1727, following legislation passed by Queen Anne, by a company of proprietors and the engineer John Hore of Newbury. The first cargo of 'Deal boards, Pig-Lead and Meal' arrived in Bath in December 1727. The navigation is now administered by the Canal & River Trust.

Weston cut is a man-made channel, opened in 1727, for boats to approach and pass through Weston lock, which created an island between the cut and the river weir, which became known as Dutch Island named after the owner of the brass mill established on the river side in the early 18th century.

The Dolphin Inn (later becoming the Locksbrook Inn) next to the lock was built for bargees in 1728. It is a Grade II listed building.

== See also ==
- Locks on the Kennet and Avon Canal

Next lock upstream	River Avon, Bristol / Kennet and Avon Canal	Next lock downstream
Bath Locks	Weston Lock; Grid reference: ST725648	Kelston Lock
