= List of locks on the Kennet and Avon Canal =

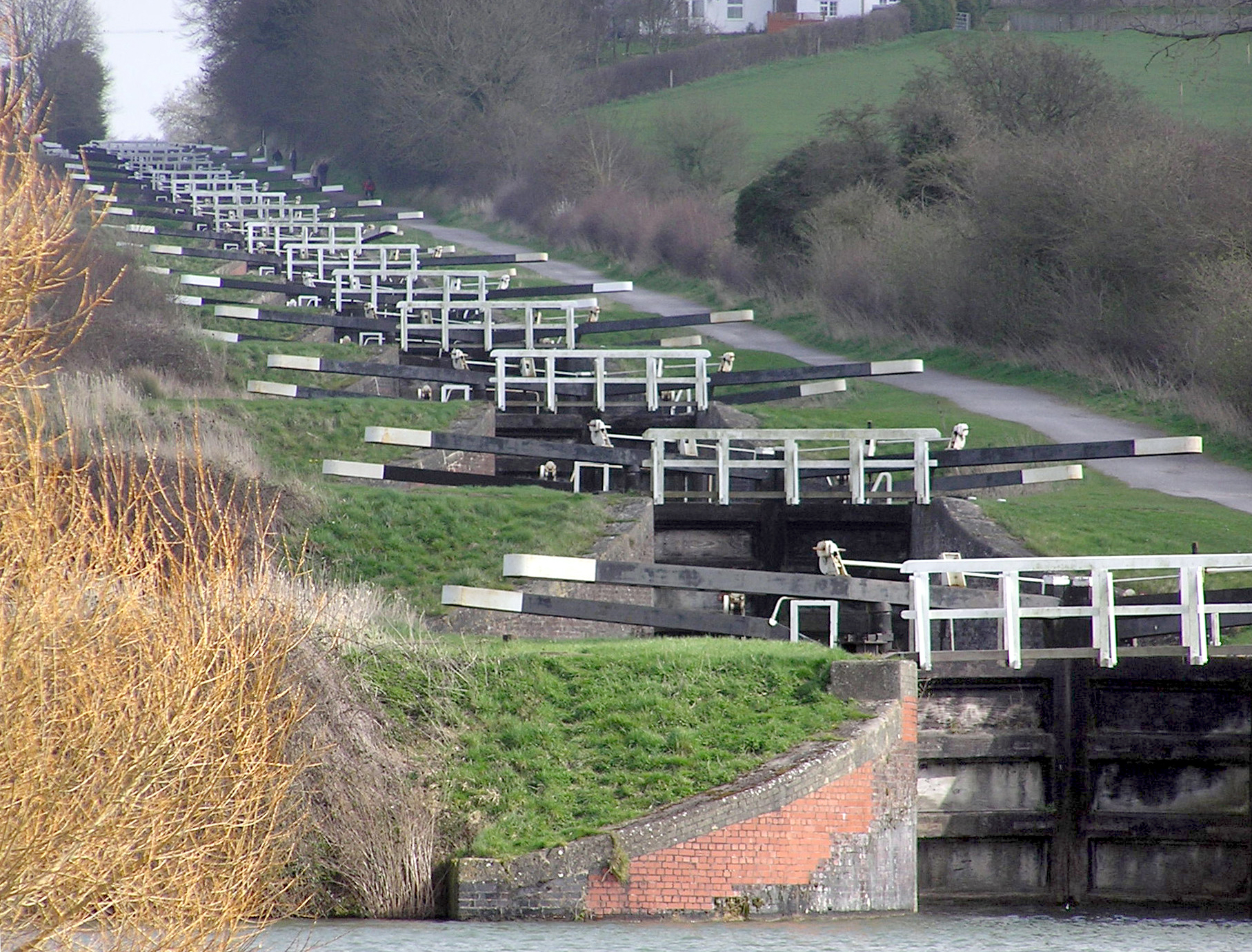
The flight of 16 locks at Caen Hill, Devizes, forming part of locks 22-50

The Kennet and Avon Canal is a canal in southern England. The name may refer to either the route of the original Kennet and Avon Canal Company, which linked the River Kennet at Newbury to the Avon at Bath, or to the entire navigation between the River Thames at Reading and the Floating Harbour at Bristol, including the earlier improved river navigations of the River Kennet between Reading and Newbury and the Avon between Bath and Bristol.

The River Kennet was made navigable to Newbury in 1723, and the Avon to Bath in 1727. The Kennet and Avon Canal between Newbury and Bath was built between 1794 and 1810 by John Rennie, to convey commercial barges carrying a variety of cargoes, and is 92 km (57 mi) long. The two river navigations and the canal total 140 km (87 mi) in length. The section from Bristol to Bath is the course of the River Avon, which flows through a wide valley and has been made navigable by a series of locks and weirs. In the later 19th and early 20th century the canal fell into disuse following competition from the Great Western Railway, who owned the canal. Between 1970 and 1990 the canal was restored, largely by volunteers, and today is a popular heritage tourism destination, for boating, canoeing, fishing, walking and cycling. It is also important for wildlife conservation.

There are 105 locks on the Kennet and Avon Canal from Bristol to the River Thames, including six on the navigable section of the River Avon from Bristol to Bath and nine on the navigable section of the River Kennet to its confluence with the Thames near Reading. The remaining 90 locks lie along the 92 km (57 mi) of canal. In Bath the canal separates from the river but follows its valley as far as Bradford on Avon. The ornate Bath Locks lead to a stretch through Limpley Stoke valley with few locks. The flight of locks at Devizes, including the Caen Hill Locks, raises the canal to its longest pound, which then ascends the four Wootton Rivers locks to the short summit pound which includes the Bruce Tunnel. Pumping stations are used to supply the canal with water. The canal continues through the rural landscape of Wiltshire and Berkshire before joining the River Kennet at Newbury and becoming a navigable river to Reading, where it flows into the River Thames.

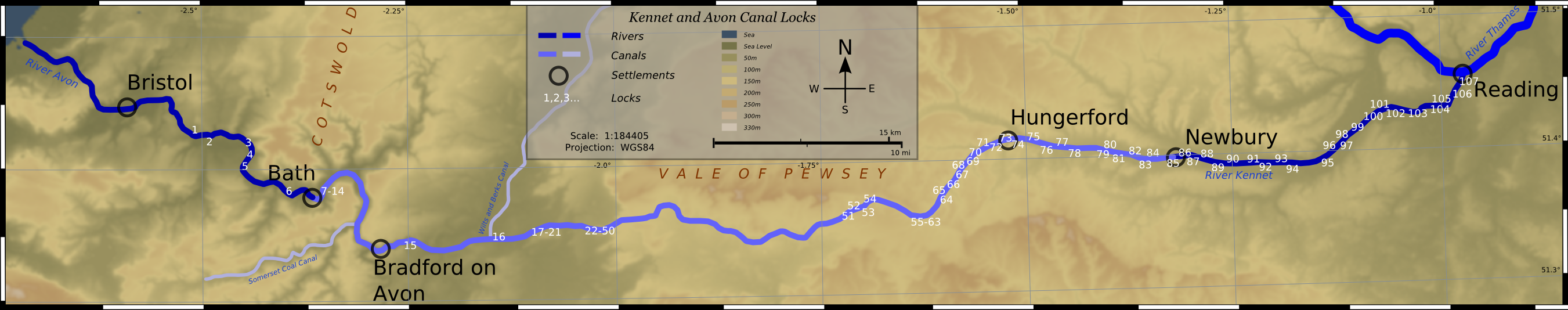
Locks on the Kennet and Avon Canal

== Locks ==
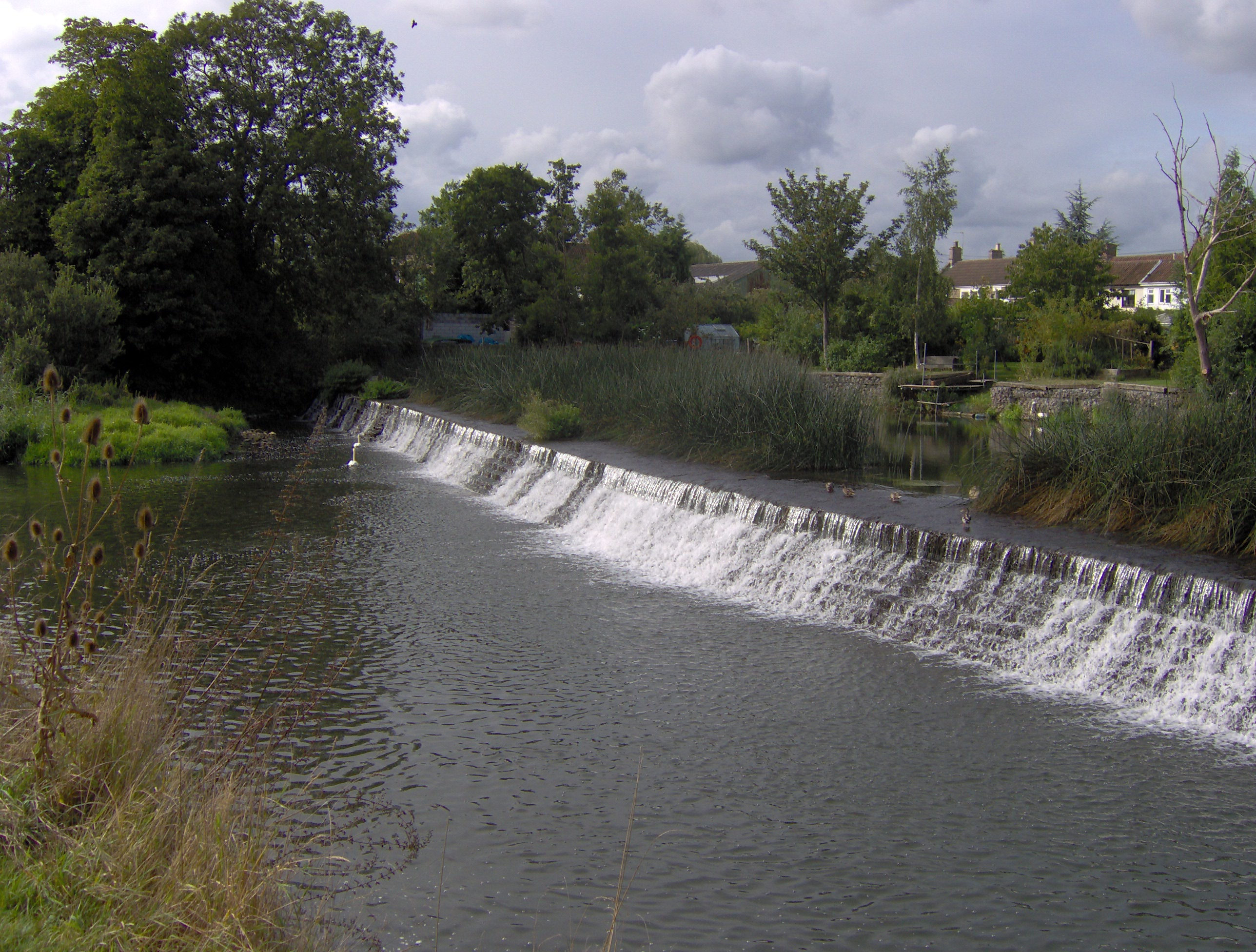
The weir on the Avon at Swineford Lock

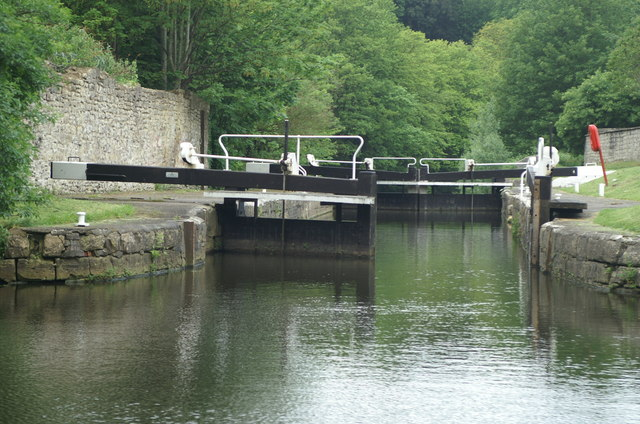
Weston Lock, at Newbridge, Bath

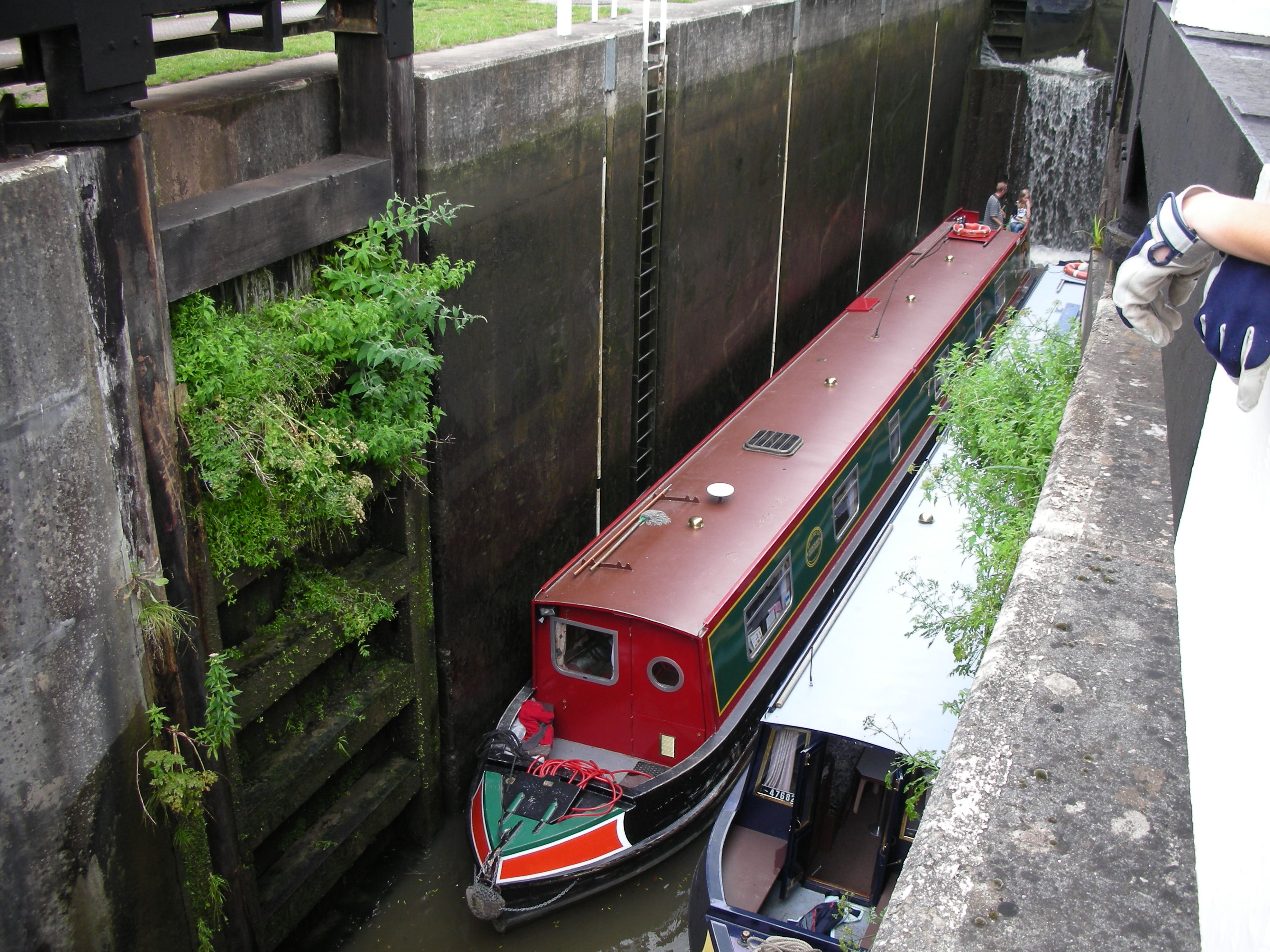
Bath Deep Lock at Widcombe in Bath

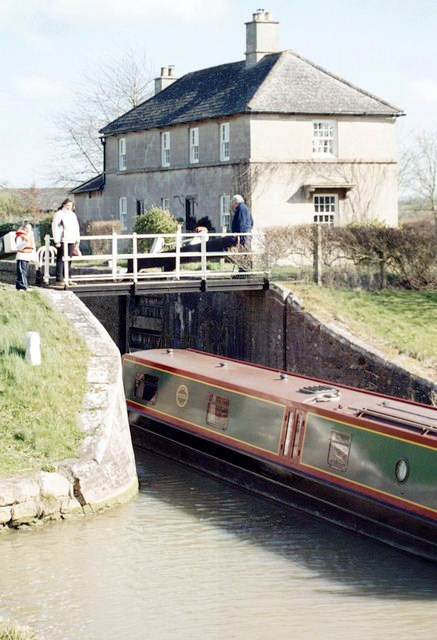
Lock keeper's cottage at Semington Locks

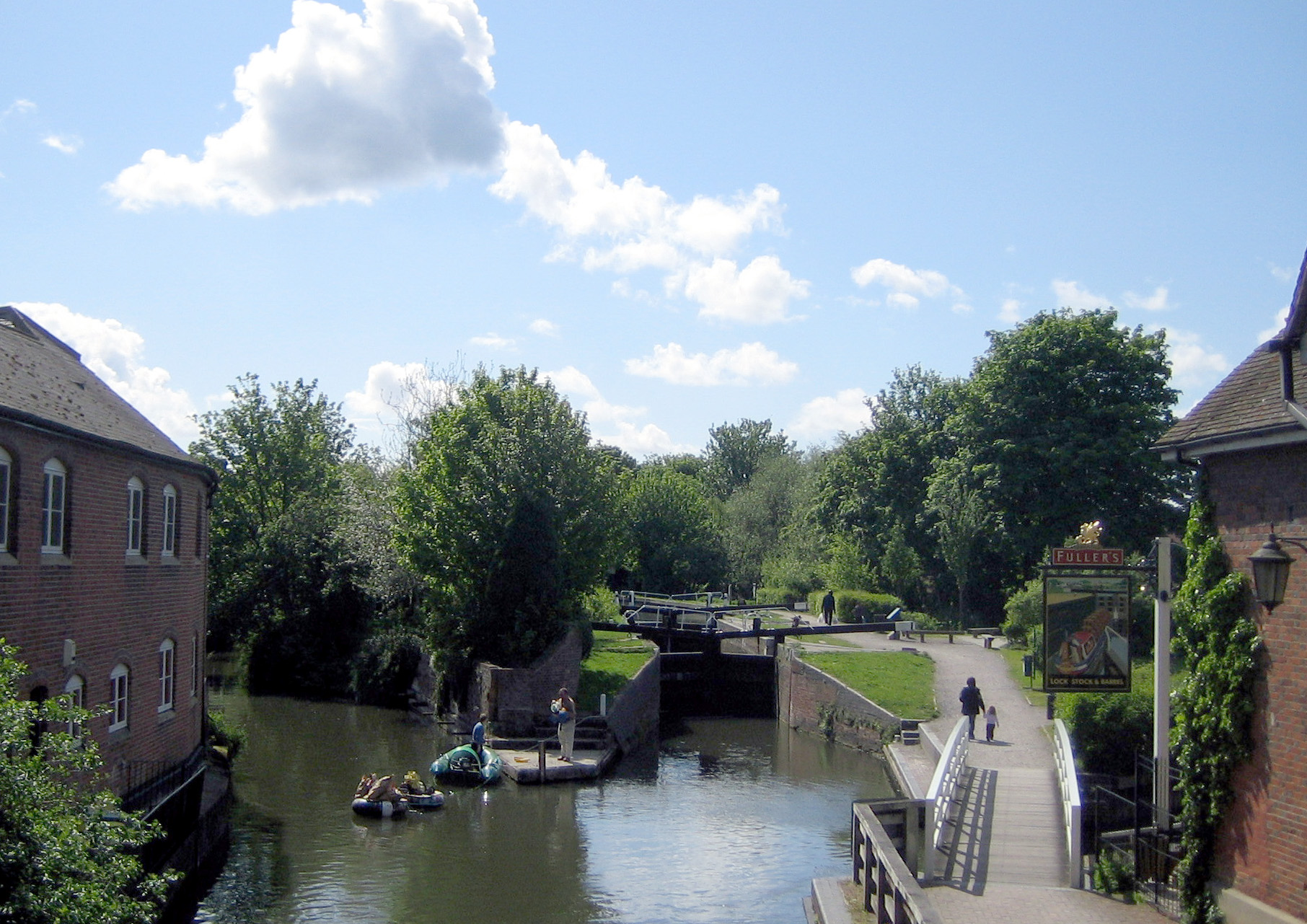
Newbury Lock at Newbury, Berkshire

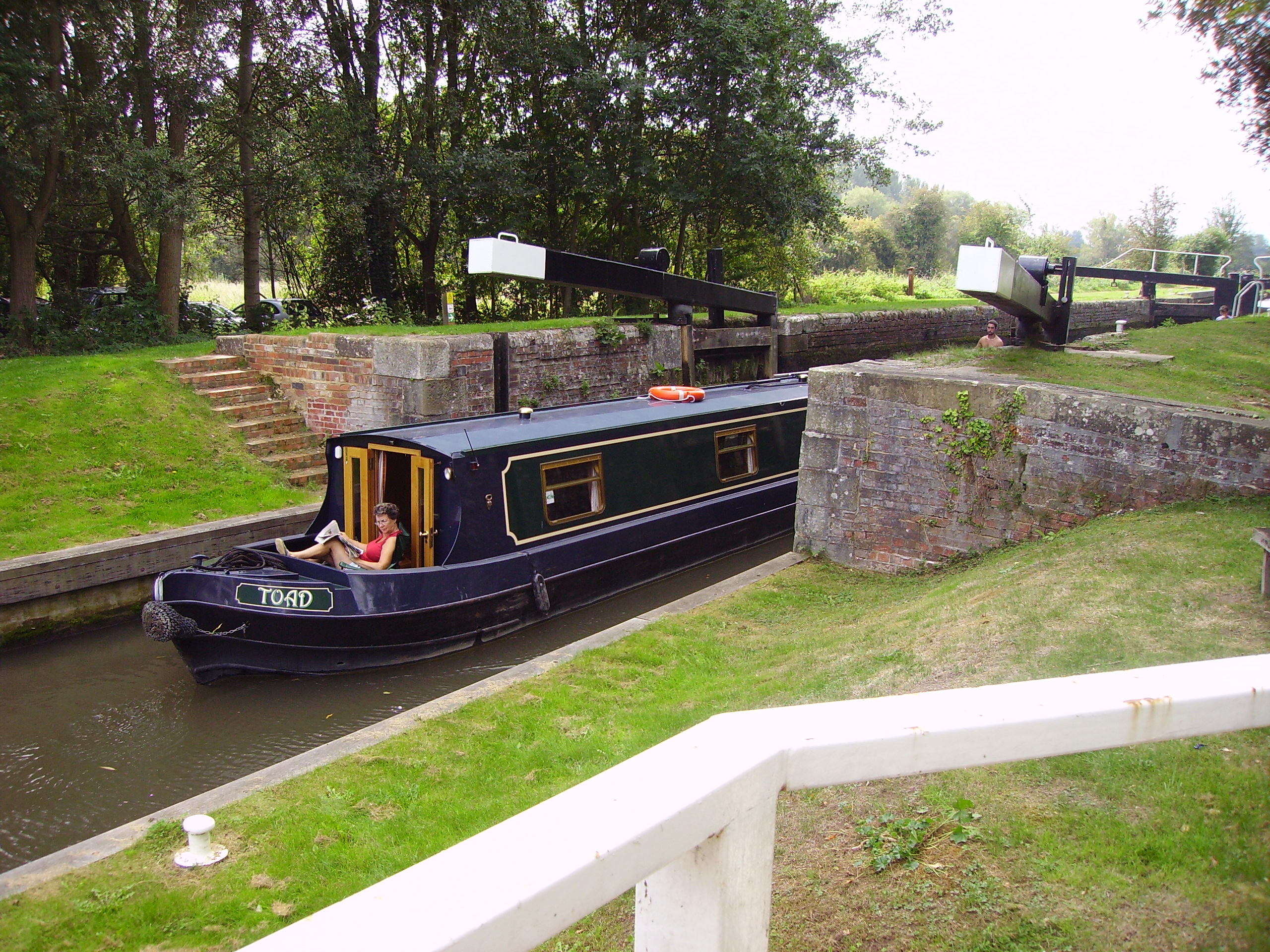
Tyle Mill Lock at Sulhamstead in West Berkshire

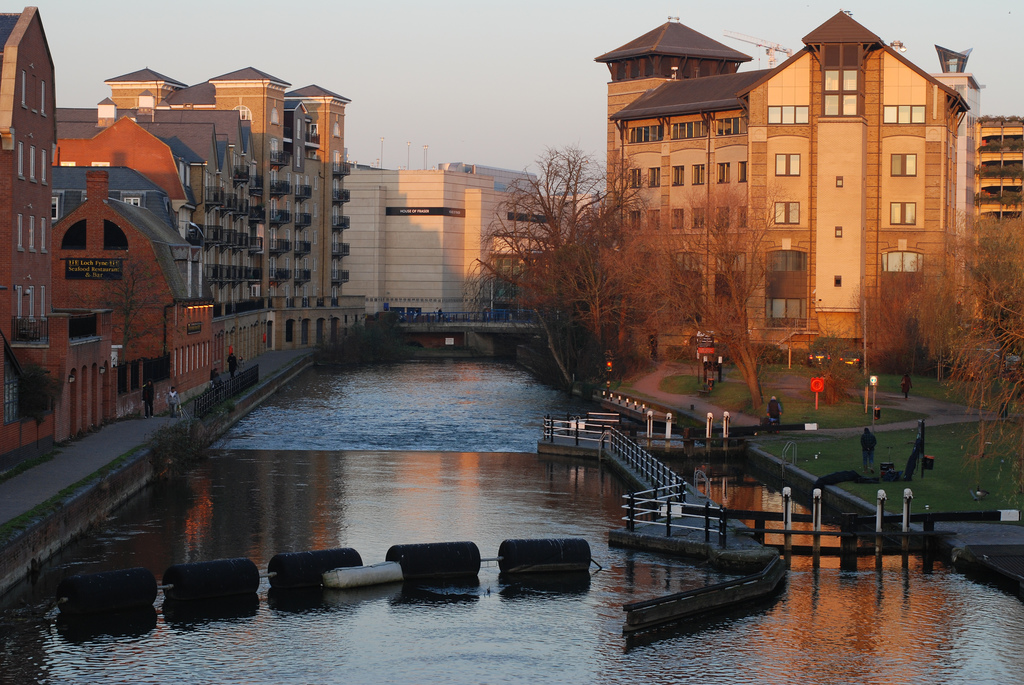
County Lock in the centre of Reading, Berkshire

The following list numbers the locks from the River Avon in Bristol to the River Thames. It includes one lock that has been removed (98, Ufton Lock) and two that have been combined to form a single deep lock (8 and 9, now Bath Deep Lock). Travelling from Bristol to Reading, locks 1 to 54 are uphill, and locks 55 to 107 are downhill.

List of locks on the Kennet and Avon Canal
Lock number^{[D]}	Lock name	Grid ref^{[C]}	Listed building grade^{[F]}	Rise / fall imperial (metres)
1	Hanham Lock^{[A]}	ST646700	II	?
2	Keynsham Lock^{[A]}	ST658690		6 feet 10 inches (2.08 m)
3	Swineford Lock^{[A]}	ST691689		4 feet 4 inches (1.32 m)
4	Saltford Lock^{[A]}	ST692679		3 feet 10 inches (1.17 m)
5	Kelston Lock^{[A]}	ST688669		3 feet 1 inch (0.94 m)
6	Weston Lock^{[A]}	ST725648		9 feet 3 inches (2.82 m)
7	Bath Bottom Lock	ST754642	II	9 feet 3 inches (2.82 m)
8/9	Bath Deep Lock	ST755642	II	19 feet 5 inches (5.92 m)
10	Wash House Lock	ST756642	II	8 feet 6 inches (2.59 m)
11	Abbey View Lock	ST757644	II	9 feet 0 inches (2.74 m)
12	Pulteney Lock	ST758645	II	9 feet 5 inches (2.87 m)
13	Bath Top Lock	ST758646	II	9 feet 0 inches (2.74 m)
14	Bradford Lock	ST825602		10 feet 3 inches (3.12 m)
15	Buckley's Lock	ST900609		8 feet 0 inches (2.44 m)
16	Barrett's Lock	ST900609		7 feet 10 inches (2.39 m)
17–21	Seend Locks	ST933613		38 feet 4 inches (11.68 m)
22–50	Caen Hill Locks	ST978614	II	237 feet 0 inches (72.24 m)
51	Wootton Rivers Lock	SU198629	II	8 feet 0 inches (2.44 m)
52	Heathy Close Lock	SU201631		8 feet 1 inch (2.46 m)
53	Brimslade Lock	SU209634	II	8 feet 0 inches (2.44 m)
54	Wootton Top Lock	SU212634		8 feet 0 inches (2.44 m)
	Summit of the canal			
55–63	Crofton Locks	SU254622	II	61 feet 0 inches (18.59 m)
64	Bedwyn Church Lock	SU278641	II	7 feet 11 inches (2.41 m)
65	Burnt Mill Lock	SU283649		7 feet 9 inches (2.36 m)
66	Potter's Lock	SU288654		7 feet 6 inches (2.29 m)
67	Little Bedwyn Lock	SU290659		6 feet 7 inches (2.01 m)
68	Oakhill Down Lock	SU299671	II	5 feet 11 inches (1.80 m)
69	Froxfield Middle Lock	SU301674		6 feet 11 inches (2.11 m)
70	Froxfield Bottom Lock	SU303676		7 feet 0 inches (2.13 m)
71	Picketfield Lock	SU315680		7 feet 0 inches (2.13 m)
72	Cobbler's Lock	SU321684		8 feet 3 inches (2.51 m)
73	Hungerford Marsh Lock	SU326685		8 feet 1 inch (2.46 m)
74	Hungerford Lock	SU336687		8 feet 0 inches (2.44 m)
75	Dun Mill Lock	SU352683	II	5 feet 8 inches (1.73 m)
76	Wire Lock	SU363681	II	6 feet 10 inches (2.08 m)
77	Brunsden Lock	SU372676	II	4 feet 11 inches (1.50 m)
78	Kintbury Lock	SU386671		5 feet 9 inches (1.75 m)
79	Dreweatt's Lock	SU411673	II	5 feet 9 inches (1.75 m)
80	Copse Lock	SU416670		6 feet 0 inches (1.83 m)
81	Hamstead Lock	SU424671	II	6 feet 5 inches (1.96 m)
82	Benham Lock	SU438665		6 feet 3 inches (1.91 m)
83	Higg's Lock	SU447667		5 feet 10 inches (1.78 m)
84	Guyer's Lock	SU453669	II	7 feet 0 inches (2.13 m)
85	Newbury Lock	SU470671	II	3 feet 6 inches (1.07 m)
86	Greenham Lock^{[B]}	SU480673		8 feet 11 inches (2.72 m)
87	Ham Lock^{[B]}	SU487672		4 feet 2 inches (1.27 m)
88	Bull's Lock^{[B]}	SU499667		5 feet 9 inches (1.75 m)
89	Widmead Lock^{[B]}	SU508663		3 feet 7 inches (1.09 m)
90	Monkey Marsh Lock^{[B]}	SU522662		8 feet 8 inches (2.64 m)
91	Colthrop Lock^{[B]}	SU538663		7 feet 7 inches (2.31 m)
92	Midgham Lock^{[B]}	SU548662		7 feet 7 inches (2.31 m)
93	Heale's Lock^{[B]}	SU562663		8 feet 11 inches (2.72 m)
94	Woolhampton Lock^{[B]}	SU571665		8 feet 11 inches (2.72 m)
95	Aldermaston Lock^{[B]}	SU601671	II	8 feet 11 inches (2.72 m)
96	Padworth Lock^{[B]}	SU606672		5 feet 1 inch (1.55 m)
97	Towney Lock^{[B]}	SU610680		9 feet 8 inches (2.95 m)
98	Site of Ufton Lock (ungated)^{[B]}^{[G]}	SU617686		
99	Tyle Mill Lock^{[B]}	SU626691		6 feet 4 inches (1.93 m)
100	Sulhamstead Lock^{[B]}	SU637698		4 feet 1 inch (1.24 m)
101	Sheffield Lock^{[B]}	SU648706	II*^{[E]}	2 feet 2 inches (0.66 m)
102	Garston Lock^{[B]}	SU655707	II*	7 feet 7 inches (2.31 m)
103	Burghfield Lock^{[B]}	SU674709		7 feet 0 inches (2.13 m)
104	Southcote Lock^{[B]}	SU693712		5 feet 3 inches (1.60 m)
105	Fobney Lock^{[B]}	SU705710		7 feet 8 inches (2.34 m)
106	County Lock^{[B]}	SU713729		1 foot 2 inches (0.36 m)
107	Blake's Lock^{[H]}	SU727735		3 feet 6 inches (1.07 m)

== Notes ==
^{A} Hanham Lock, Keynsham Lock, Swineford Lock, Saltford Lock, Kelston Lock and Weston Lock are technically on the Avon Navigation rather than being truly part of the Kennet and Avon Canal
^{B} Locks below Newbury and above High Bridge in Reading are technically on the Kennet Navigation rather than being truly part of the Kennet and Avon Canal
^{C} Grid reference is based on the British national grid reference system, also known as OSGB36, and is the system used by the Ordnance Survey.
^{D} Lock numbers are as given in the Pearsons Guide and as numbered on the lock paddles.
^{E} Sheffield Lock is also a scheduled monument.
^{F} Listed building status is given to buildings (including locks) in the United Kingdom which are designated by English Heritage on behalf of the government, as being of special architectural, historical or cultural significance. There are three types of listed status (in descending order of importance and difficulty to obtain planning permission; Grade I: buildings of exceptional interest, Grade II*: particularly important buildings of special interest, Grade II: buildings of special interest.
^{G} Ufton Lock is still extant, but the gates have been removed so that boats go straight through. The next lock above, Towney Lock, was deepened when rebuilt to allow for the lower downstream water level.
^{H} Blake's Lock is on the part of the River Kennet, below High Bridge in Reading, that has been navigable since at least the medieval period and now administered by the Environment Agency as part of the River Thames navigation.

== See also ==
- Canals of the United Kingdom
- History of the British canal system
