= Monkey Marsh Lock =

Canal lock in Thatcham, Berkshire, England

Coordinates: 51.3926°N 1.2479°W

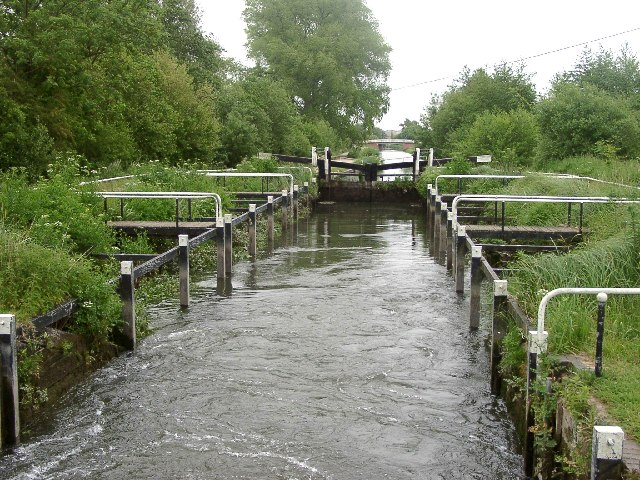
The unusual Monkey Marsh Lock on the Kennet & Avon Canal at Thatcham, the bridge in the distance leading to Thatcham railway station level crossing.

Monkey Marsh Lock is a lock on the Kennet and Avon Canal, at Thatcham, Berkshire, England.

Monkey Marsh Lock was built between 1718 and 1723 under the supervision of the engineer John Hore of Newbury. The canal is administered by Canal & River Trust. The lock has a rise/fall of 8 ft 8 in (2.64 m).

One of only two remaining working examples of turf sided locks on the canal (the other being Garston Lock) of more than a dozen originally, Monkey Marsh Lock is listed as an ancient monument by English Heritage

== See also ==
- Locks on the Kennet and Avon Canal

Next lock upstream	River Kennet / Kennet and Avon Canal	Next lock downstream
Widmead Lock	Monkey Marsh Lock; Grid reference: SU522662	Colthrop Lock
