= Keynsham Lock =

Coordinates: 51.41977°N 2.49192°W

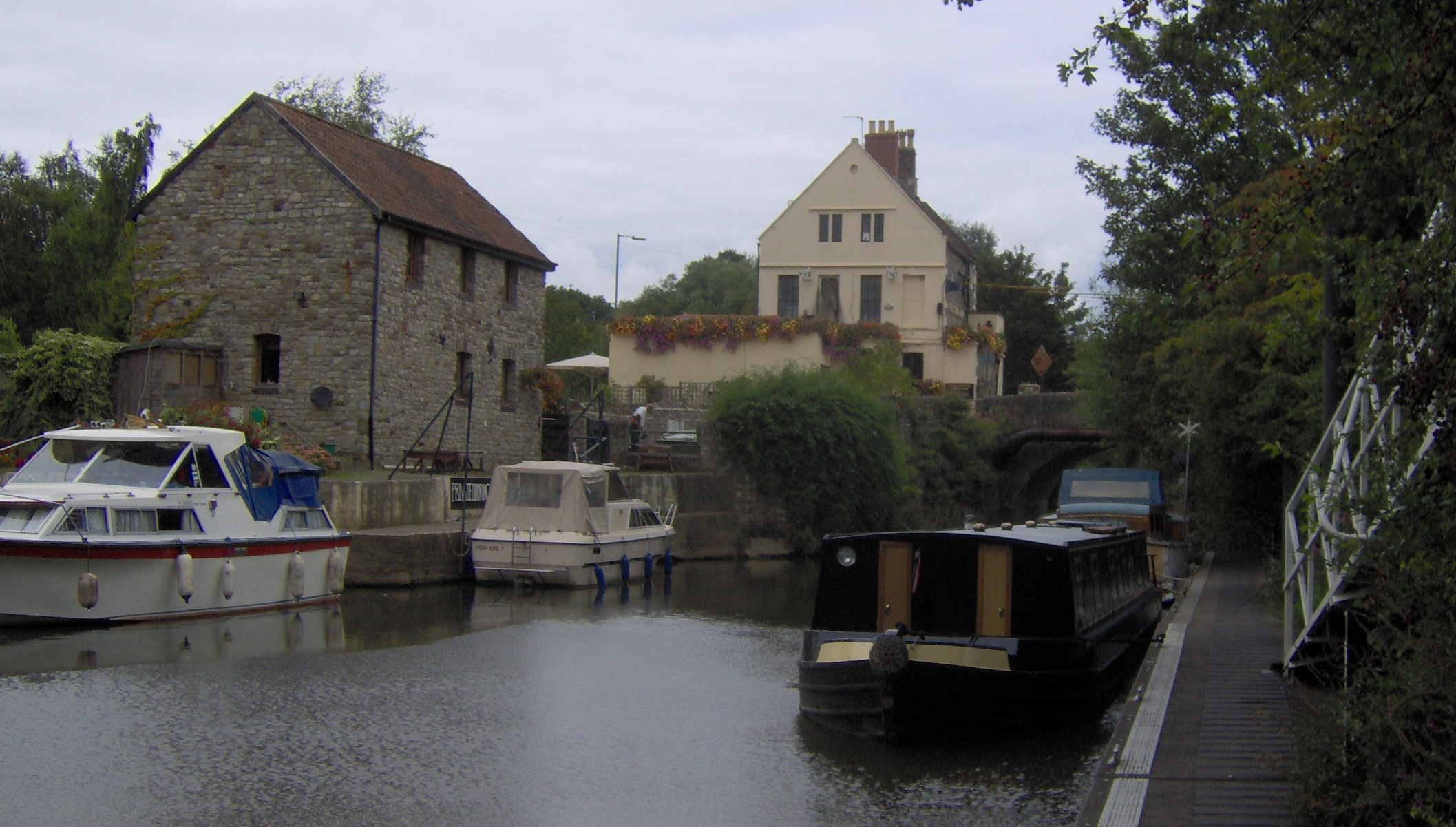
Mooring by the Lock Keeper pub at Keynsham Lock

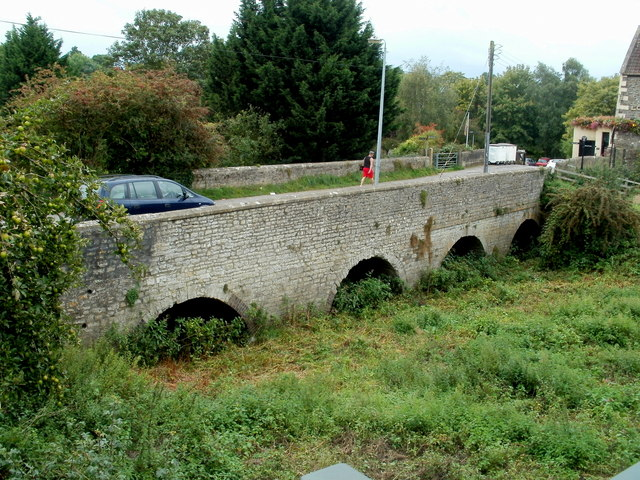
The old bridge next to the lock

Keynsham Lock is a canal lock situated on the River Avon at Keynsham, England.

The Bristol Avon Navigation, which runs the 15 miles (24 km) from the Kennet and Avon Canal at Hanham Lock to the Bristol Channel at Avonmouth, was constructed between 1724 and 1727, following legislation passed by Queen Anne, by a company of proprietors and the engineer John Hore of Newbury. The first cargo of 'Deal boards, Pig-Lead and Meal' arrived in Bath in December 1727. The navigation is now administered by the Canal & River Trust.

The old bridge next to the lock played a part in the Civil War as the Roundheads saved the town and also camped there for the night, using the pub now known as the Lock Keeper's Inn as a guard post. The lock opened in 1727.

Just above the lock are some visitor moorings and a pub, on an island between the lock and the weir. The weir side of the island is also the mouth of the River Chew. The adjacent bridge was replaced after damage in the Great Flood of 1968.

== See also ==
- Locks on the Kennet and Avon Canal

Next lock upstream	River Avon, Bristol / Kennet and Avon Canal	Next lock downstream
Swineford Lock	Keynsham Lock; Grid reference: ST658690	Hanham Lock
