= Widmead Lock =

Canal lock in Berkshire, England

Coordinates: 51.39347°N 1.27125°W

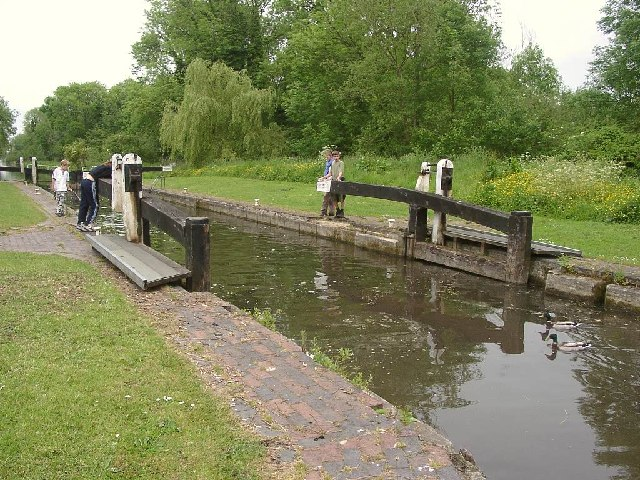
Widmead Lock, Kennet & Avon Canal.

Widmead Lock is a lock on the Kennet and Avon Canal, between Newbury and Thatcham, Berkshire, England.

Widmead Lock was built between 1718 and 1723 under the supervision of the engineer John Hore of Newbury. The canal is administered by the Canal & River Trust. The lock has a rise/fall of 3 ft 7 in (1.09 m).

== See also ==
- Locks on the Kennet and Avon Canal

| Next lock upstream | River Kennet / Kennet and Avon Canal | Next lock downstream |
| Bull's Lock | Widmead Lock; Grid reference: SU508663 | Monkey Marsh Lock |
