= County Lock =

River lock in Reading, England

Coordinates: 51.45111°N 0.973673°W

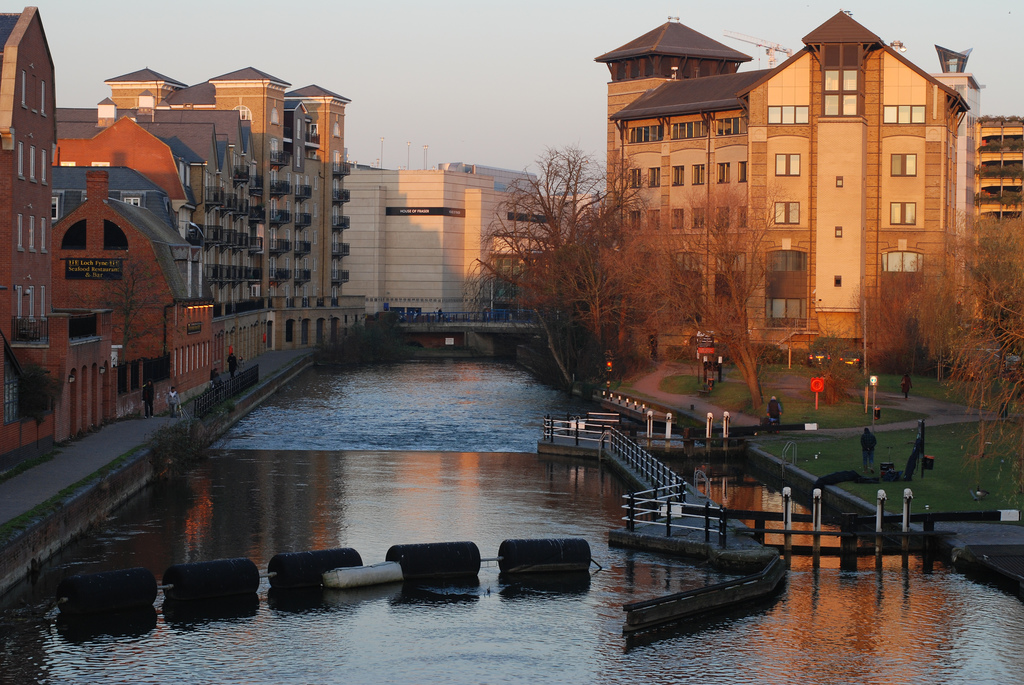
County Lock, looking downstream. Brewery Gut is entered under the bridge in the distance.

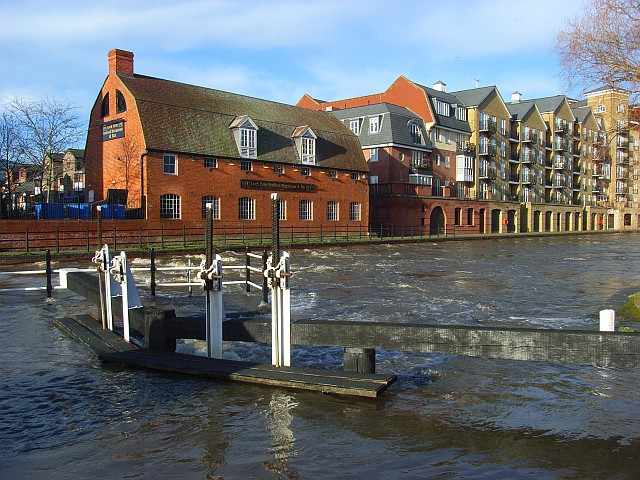
The lower lock gates, with the river in a state of flood. The old brewery stable block can be seen.

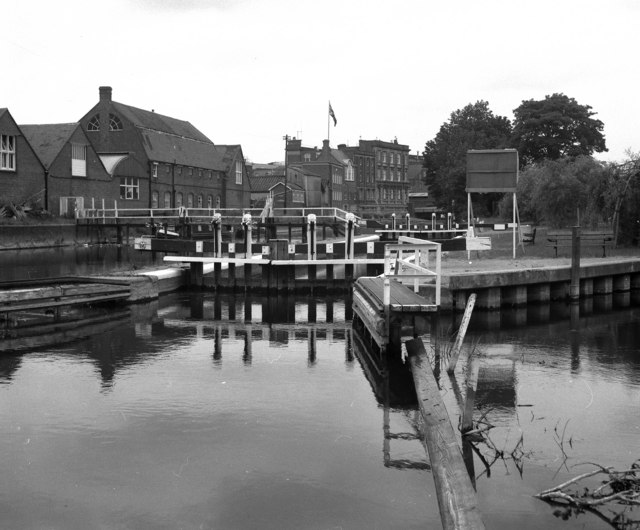
County Lock in 1975 with Simonds' Brewery in background.

County Lock is a lock on the River Kennet in Reading town centre in the English county of Berkshire. It is now administered by the Canal & River Trust as part of the Kennet and Avon Canal. Downstream from the lock is Brewery Gut, a particularly fast flowing, narrow and dangerous stretch of the river.

County Lock has the lowest rise of the locks on the Kennet, as boats only rise or fall about 30 cm (1 foot) in the lock. The main stream of the Kennet flows down the weir on the far side of the lock, while another arm of the Kennet disappears under the Bridge Street Roundabout.

The first County Lock was built between 1718 and 1723, during the navigation works undertaken under the supervision of the engineer John Hore of Newbury in order to create the Kennet Navigation between Reading and Newbury. Initially the lock was located on the north side of the river, adjacent to Bear Wharf, but it was relocated to its current location on the south bank as part of the Reading waterworks improvement scheme of 1876.

The land on both sides of the river adjacent to County Lock was formerly part of the site of Simonds Brewery. Brewery Gut takes its name from the brewery. In the days of horse haulage, this stretch of river had no towpath, and a long tow line had to be sent down-river on a specially designed float. To add to the difficulty, at its narrowest the gut is only 25 feet (7.6 m) wide, causing strong currents. Multiple vessels cannot safely pass due to the tortuous and narrow route, and there have been instances in the past of boats colliding and sinking. Today passage through the gut is controlled by traffic lights.

Simonds' Brewery closed in the late 1970s, and most of the brewery buildings have been demolished. Around the lock itself they have been replaced by a mixture of apartments and offices, although the brewery's old stable building, which overlooks the lock, has been preserved and was formerly occupied by a Loch Fyne restaurant. The part of the brewery that enveloped Brewery Gut has been replaced by The Oracle shopping centre, and boats can be seen navigating through the middle of the Riverside Level of that complex, lined on both sides by restaurants and pubs.

== See also ==
- Locks on the Kennet and Avon Canal

== Bibliography ==
- Clew, Kenneth R (1978). Wessex Waterway - A Guide to the Kennet & Avon Canal. Bradford-on-Avon, Wiltshire: Moonraker Press. ISBN 0-239-00181-8.

Next lock upstream	River Kennet	Next lock downstream
Fobney Lock	County Lock; Grid reference SU713729	Blake's Lock
