= Aldermaston Lock =

Canal lock in Aldermaston, Berkshire, England

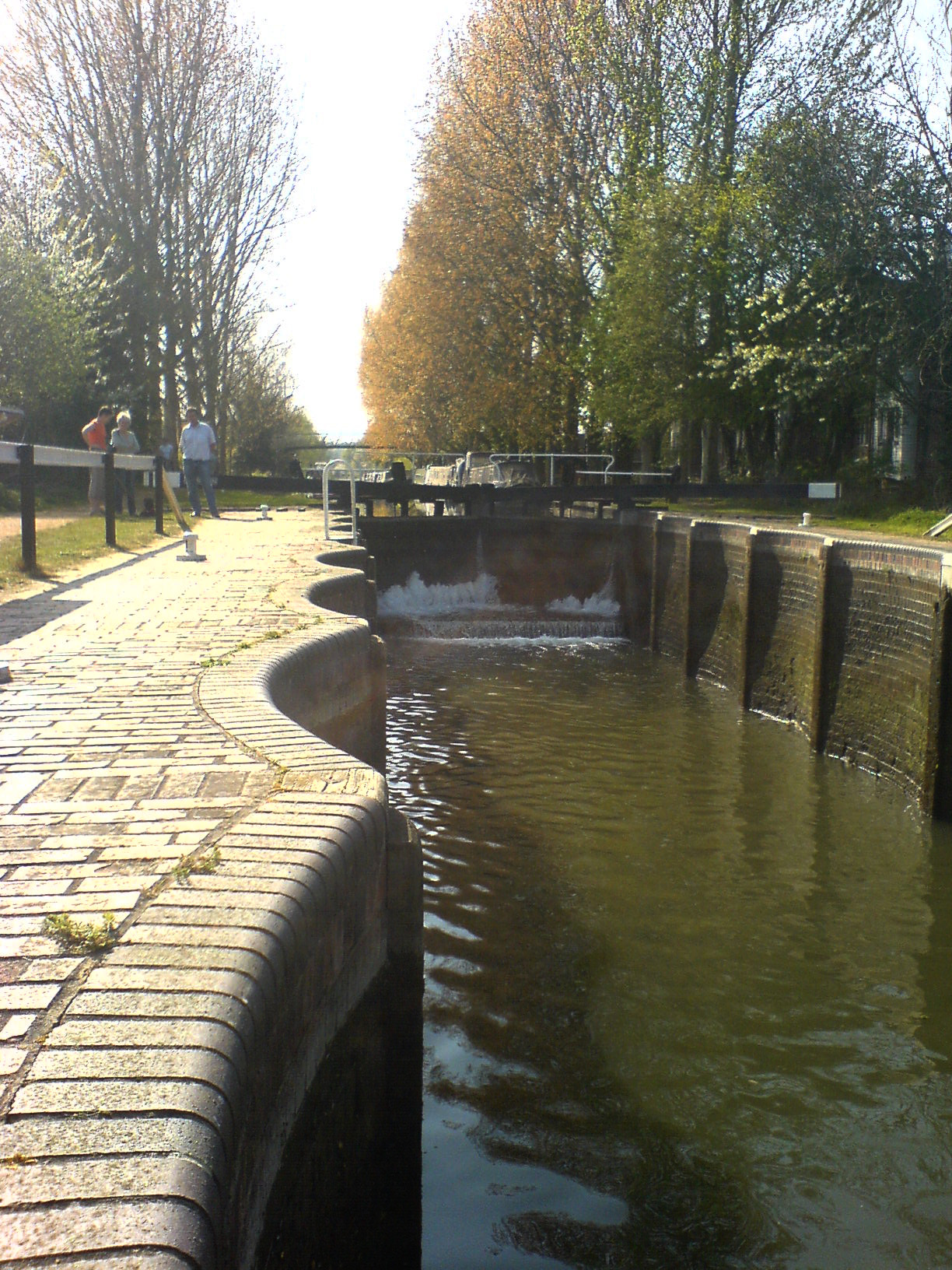
- Details of the scalloped walls
- Interactive map of Aldermaston Lock
- 51.4002°N 1.1374°W
- Waterway: Kennet and Avon Canal
- Country: England
- County: Berkshire
- Maintained by: Canal & River Trust
- Operation: manual
- First built: 1718–1723
- Latest built: 1984
- Fall: 8 feet 11 inches (2.72 m)
- Heritage status: grade II listed building
- Lock No 95

Aldermaston Lock is a lock on the Kennet and Avon Canal, at Aldermaston Wharf in the English county of Berkshire. It stands at the junction of the civil parishes of Padworth, Beenham and Aldermaston.

Aldermaston Lock was built between 1718 and 1723 under the supervision of the engineer John Hore of Newbury. It was originally turf-sided, but enlarged in the mid-eighteenth century and given scalloped brick walls. It was altered in 1984 when the walls were raised to the full height of lock as part of its restoration. The original height of the scalloped walls is marked by a line of blue bricks.

It was originally called Brewhouse Lock because Strange's Brewery stood beside it.

Along with the length of the canal, the lock is the responsibility of the Canal & River Trust. It has a rise/fall of 8 feet 11 inches (2.72 m).

It is a grade II listed building. Below the lock is Aldermaston Lift Bridge and Aldermaston Wharf, where the Kennet and Avon Canal Trust operate a tea room.

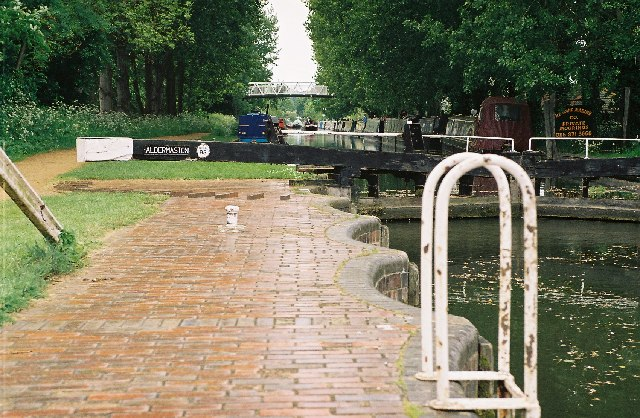
Top gates and scalloped lock walls.

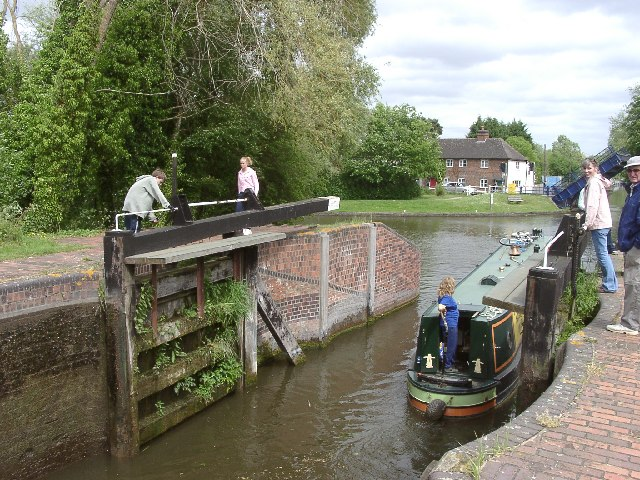
A boat leaving the bottom of the lock.

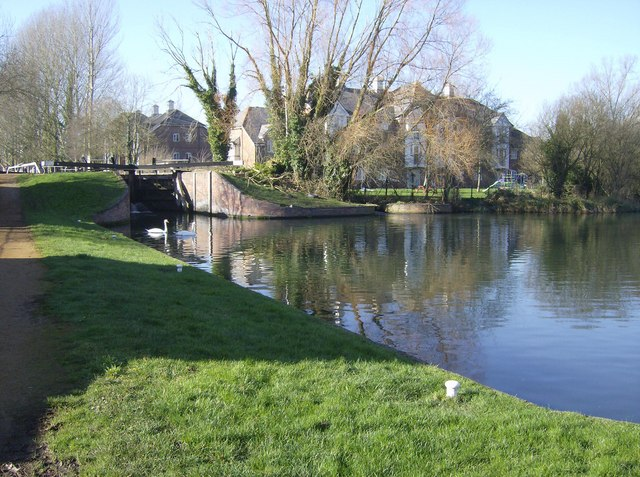
View of the lock and former wharf area

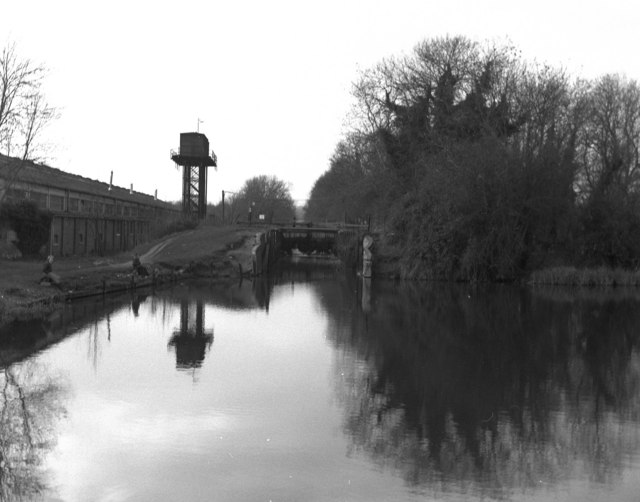
Aldermaston Lock in 1975 before restoration.

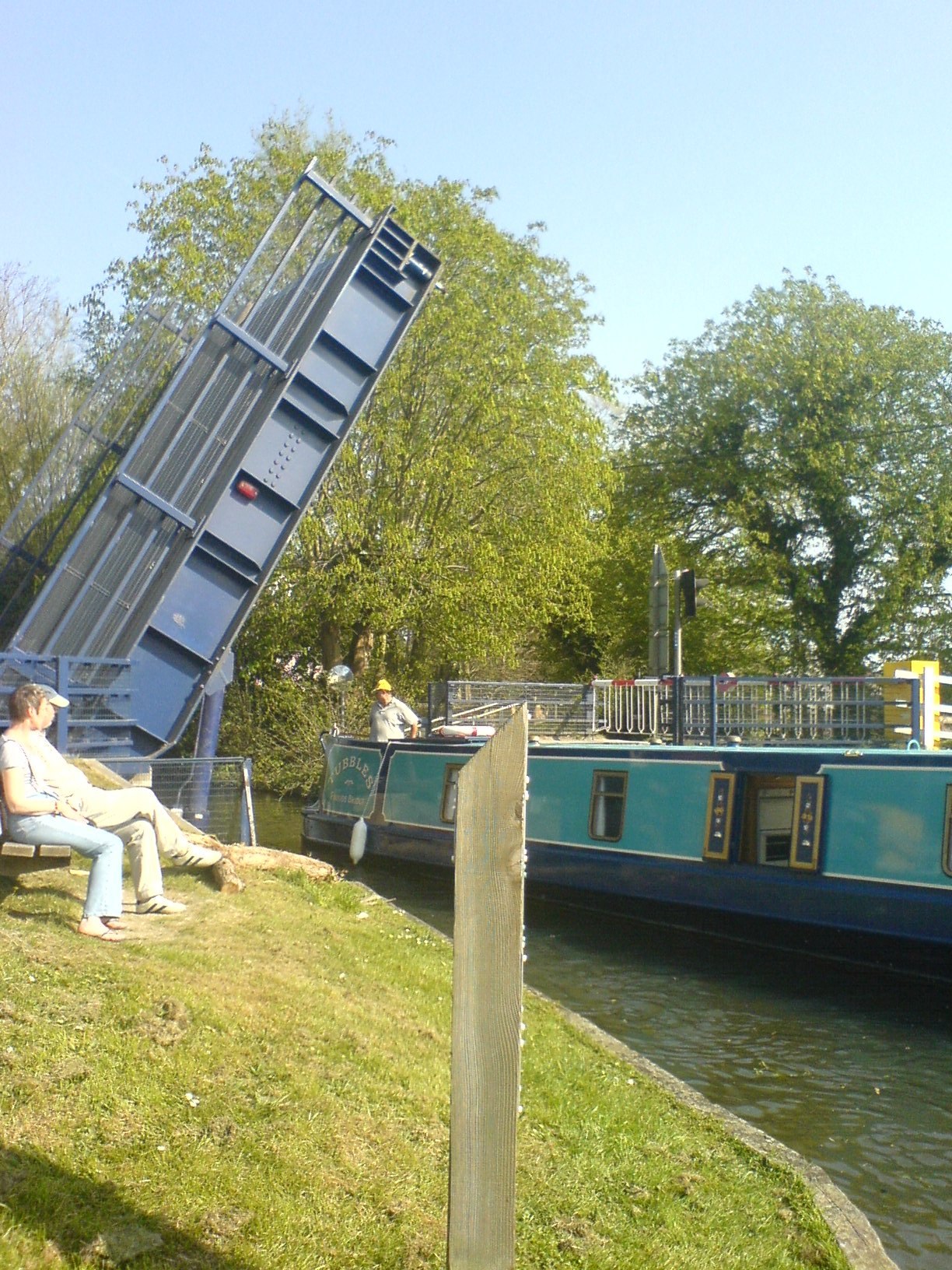
Lift Bridge near Aldermaston Lock.

== See also ==
- Locks on the Kennet and Avon Canal

Next lock upstream	River Kennet / Kennet and Avon Canal	Next lock downstream
Woolhampton Lock	Aldermaston Lock; Grid reference: SU601671	Padworth Lock
