= Bradford Lock =

Canal lock in Wiltshire, England

Coordinates: 51.3411°N 2.2519°W

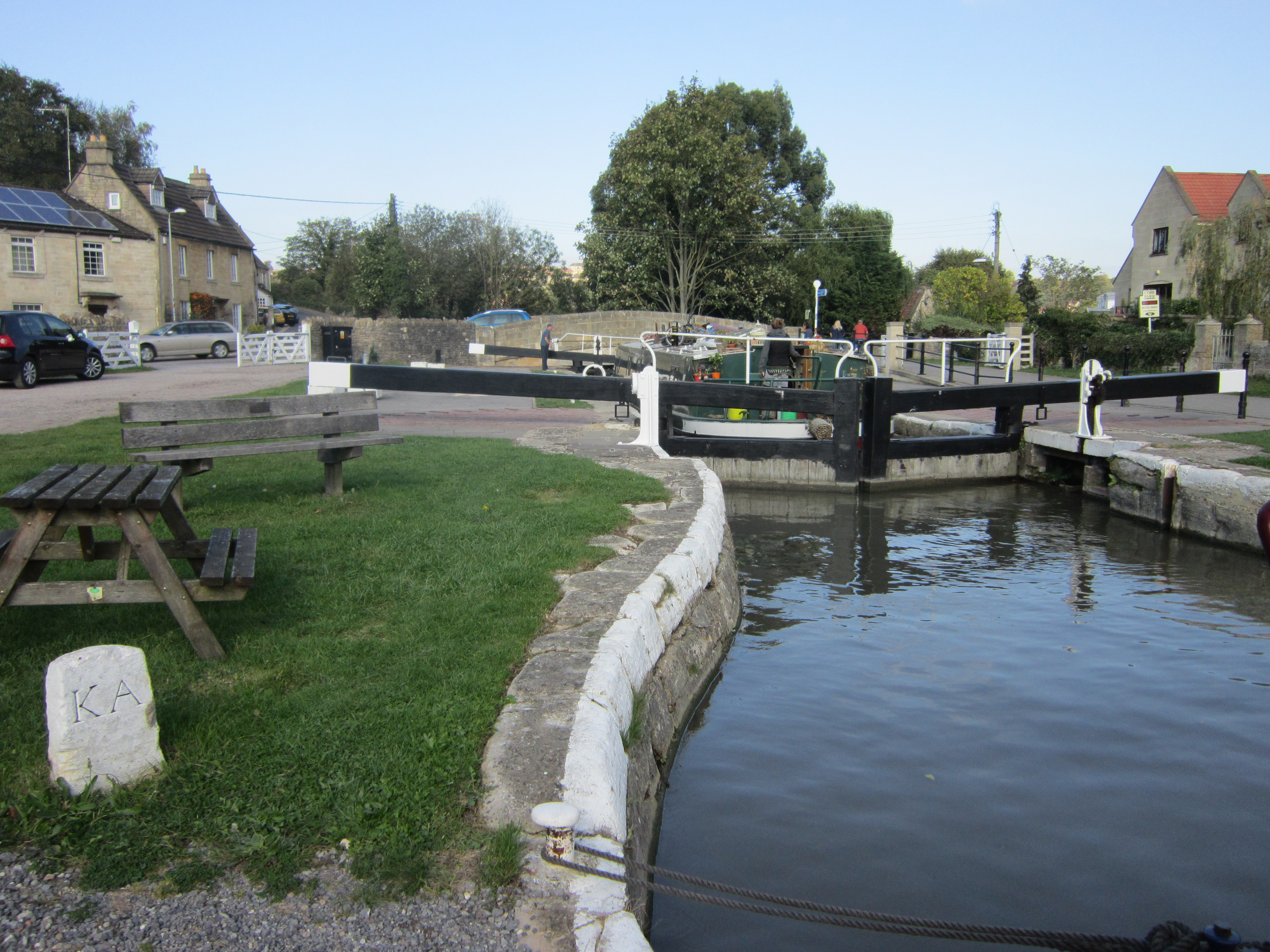

Bradford Lock (grid reference ST825602) is on the Kennet and Avon Canal at Bradford on Avon, Wiltshire, England.

It was in Bradford on Avon that the first sod was cut for the Kennet and Avon Canal in 1794. The lock has a rise/fall of 12 ft 6 inches (3.81 m).

There are moorings above and below Bradford Lock. Next to the canal, a little way west of the lock, is a large 14th-century tithe barn. Beside the lock is Bradford Wharf, where there are several historical buildings associated with the canal. The Wharfinger's House was the home of the Canal Company employee who managed the wharf. Across the canal was a gauging dock where canal boats were measured and weighed to determine toll rates.

The pound below the lock is about ten miles (16 km) long and is the second longest on the canal, finishing when arriving at Bath Locks.

== Gallery ==
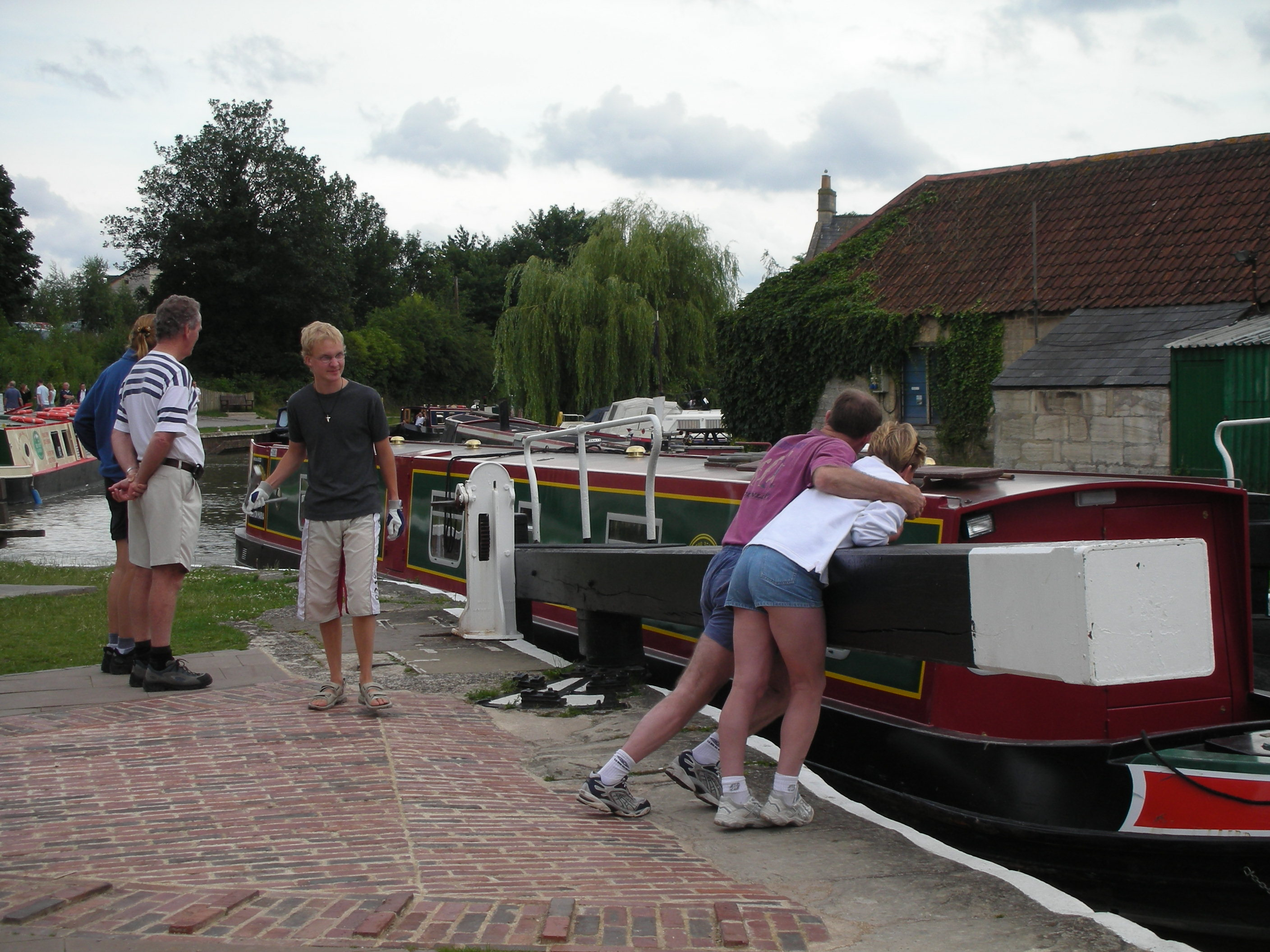
Summer time at the Bradford Lock

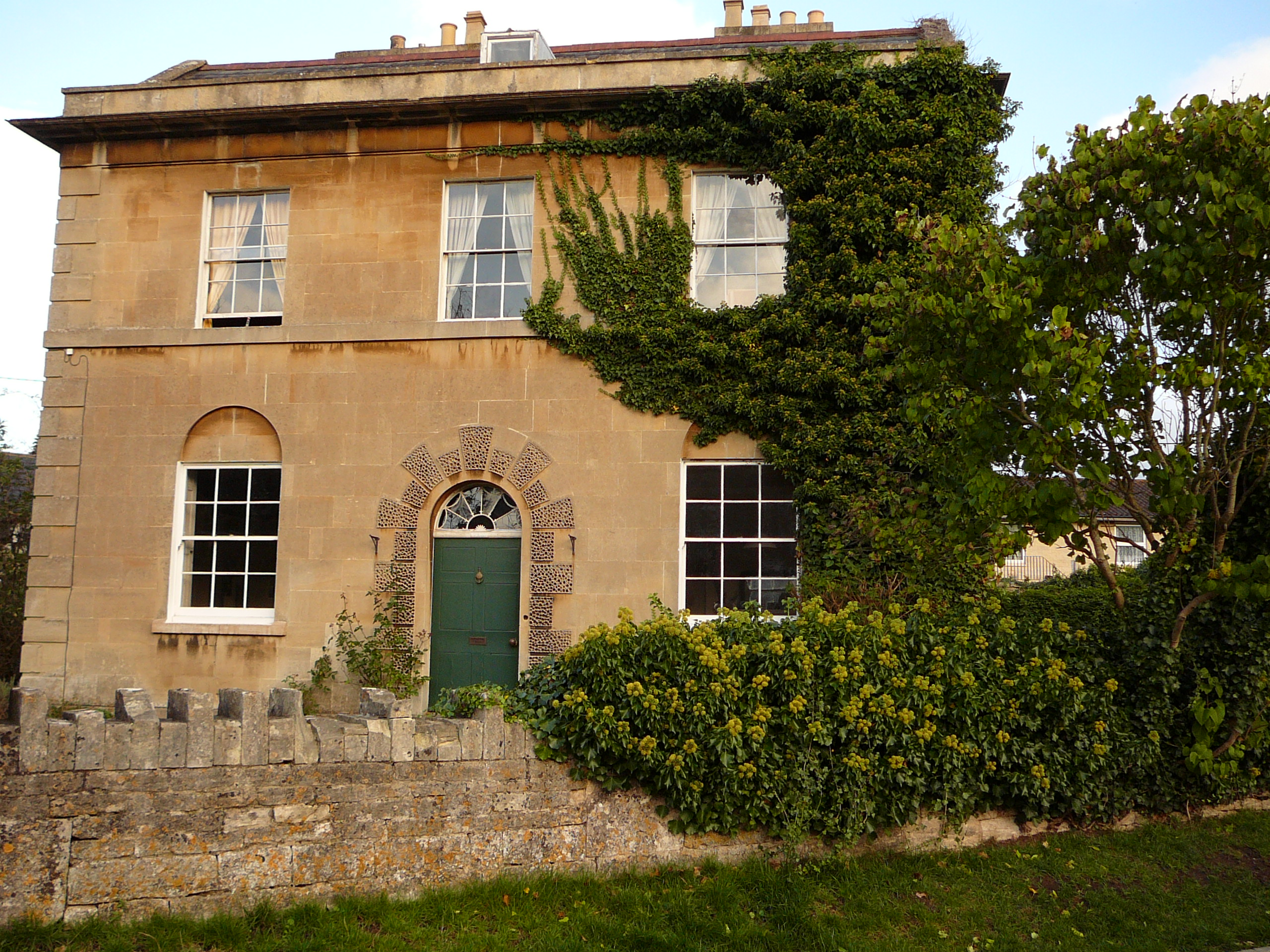
Wharfinger's House at Bradford Wharf

== See also ==
- Locks on the Kennet and Avon Canal

Next lock upstream	Kennet and Avon Canal	Next lock downstream
Semington Locks	Bradford Lock; Grid reference: ST825602	Bath Locks
