= Colthrop Lock =

Lock on the Kennet and Avon Canal in England

Coordinates: 51.39320°N 1.22814°W

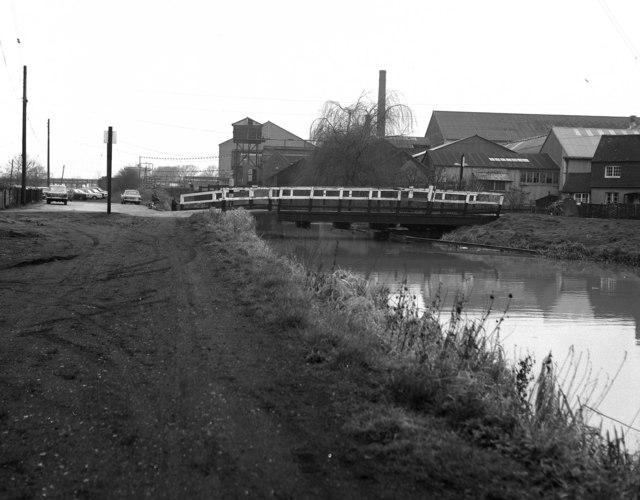
Colthrop Lock and bridge

Colthrop Lock is a lock on the Kennet and Avon Canal, at Thatcham, Berkshire, England.

Colthrop Lock was built between 1718 and 1723 under the supervision of the engineer John Hore of Newbury. The canal is administered by the Canal & River Trust. The lock has a rise/fall of 7 ft 7 in (2.31 m).

== See also ==
- Locks on the Kennet and Avon Canal

Next lock upstream	River Kennet / Kennet and Avon Canal	Next lock downstream
Monkey Marsh Lock	Colthrop Lock; Grid reference: SU538663	Midgham Lock
