= Blake's Lock =

Coordinates: 51.45582°N 0.95506°W

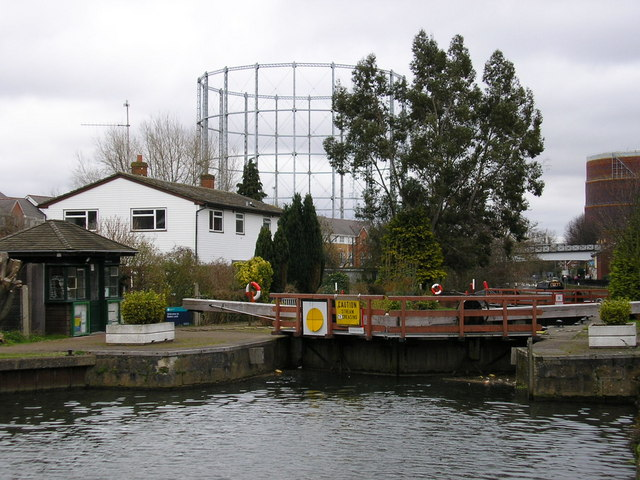
- Waterway: River Kennet
- County: Berkshire
- Maintained by: Environment Agency
- Operation: Manual
- First built: 1802
- Length: 37.39 m (122 ft 8 in)
- Width: 5.75 m (18 ft 10 in)
- Fall: 1.07 m (3 ft 6 in)
- Above sea level: about 54 m (177 ft)
- Distance to Teddington Lock: 55 miles (89 km)
- Distance to Bristol Harbour: 87 miles (140 km)

Blake's Lock is a lock situated on the River Kennet in Reading, Berkshire, England. It is on the short reach of the River Kennet which is administered as if it were part of the River Thames and is hence owned and managed by the Environment Agency.

== History ==
The first mile of the Kennet from its junction with the River Thames has been navigable since the 13th century. Blake's Lock was originally a flash lock known as Brokenburglok. In 1404 the Abbot of Reading Abbey, who had control of the River Kennet, made an agreement with the town's guild to allow craft to pass through the lock between sunrise and sunset on payment of a one penny toll. By 1794, not much had changed, with John Rennie, the engineer of the Kennet and Avon Canal describing it as "a very bad and inconvenient staunch lock".

The lock was converted to a timber-constructed pound lock in 1802 to improve navigation from the Thames into the River Kennet enabling boats to travel all the way to the Bristol area. The lock retains its manual beams (not the originals, new beams were fitted in 2006), so far avoiding the progress towards hydraulic power. The lock was closed during winter 2017-18 for work that included repairing and re-sheeting the lock gates and refurbishing the chamber walls.

== Riverside Museum at Blake's Lock ==
Next to the lock is the Riverside Museum at Blake's Lock which tells the story of Reading's two rivers — the Kennet and the Thames. The museum occupies two former industrial buildings, the Screen House and the Turbine House. Exhibits include a gypsy caravan and information about the Romani people, a medieval mill wheel, preserved turbine machinery, and seasonal art exhibits.

== See also ==
- Locks on the River Thames
- Locks on the Kennet and Avon Canal

== Bibliography ==
- Clew, Kenneth R (1978). Wessex Waterway - A Guide to the Kennet & Avon Canal. Bradford-on-Avon, Wiltshire: Moonraker Press. ISBN 0-239-00181-8.
- Pearson, Michael (2003). Kennet & Avon Middle Thames: Pearson's Canal Companion. Rugby: Central Waterways Supplies. ISBN 0-907864-97-X.

Next lock upstream	River Kennet	Next lock downstream
County Lock	Blake's Lock; Grid reference: SU727735	Sonning Lock (on River Thames)
