= Hanham Lock =

Canal lock in Gloucestershire, England

Coordinates: 51.42789°N 2.51057°W

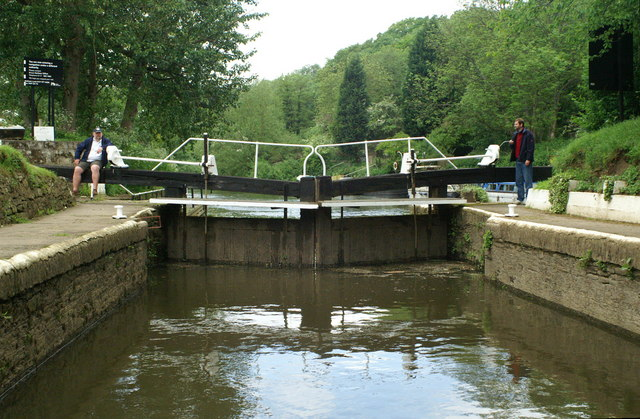
Hanham Lock

Hanham Lock is a canal lock situated on the River Avon, at the village of Hanham near Bristol, England.

The Bristol Avon Navigation, which runs the 15 miles (24 km) from the Kennet and Avon Canal at Hanham Lock to the Bristol Channel at Avonmouth, was constructed between 1724 and 1727, following legislation passed by Queen Anne, by a company of proprietors and the engineer John Hore of Newbury. The first cargo of 'Deal boards, Pig-Lead and Meal' arrived in Bath in December 1727. The navigation is now administered by the Canal & River Trust.

Hanham Lock is the first lock east of Netham where boats leave the Bristol Floating Harbour. A weir carries the river and boats use the adjacent lock. It is numbered as 1 and is officially the first on the Kennet and Avon Canal. It opened in 1727 and there used to be a colliery wharf just west of the lock, however the mines closed in the 19th century.

The river below Hanham Lock is considered to be tidal, as high tides often pass over the weir at Netham. Some spring tides will also pass over the weir here, making the river tidal up to Keynsham Lock.

The canal superintendent's house was built here, now a Grade II listed building; it is called "Picnic House". In front of this house once stood Hanham Mills, an archway over the towpath being all that remained of the mills until 1897, when the Hanham Abbotts Parish Church had the archway demolished due to its poor state of repair.

Just above the lock are some permanent and visitor moorings and two pubs.

== See also ==
- Locks on the Kennet and Avon Canal

| Next lock upstream | River Avon, Bristol / Kennet and Avon Canal | Next lock downstream |
| Keynsham Lock | Hanham Lock; Grid reference: ST646700 | Netham Lock (exit from Bristol Harbour) |
