= Bath Locks =

Canal locks in Bath, England

Coordinates: 51°22′37″N 2°21′6.5″W

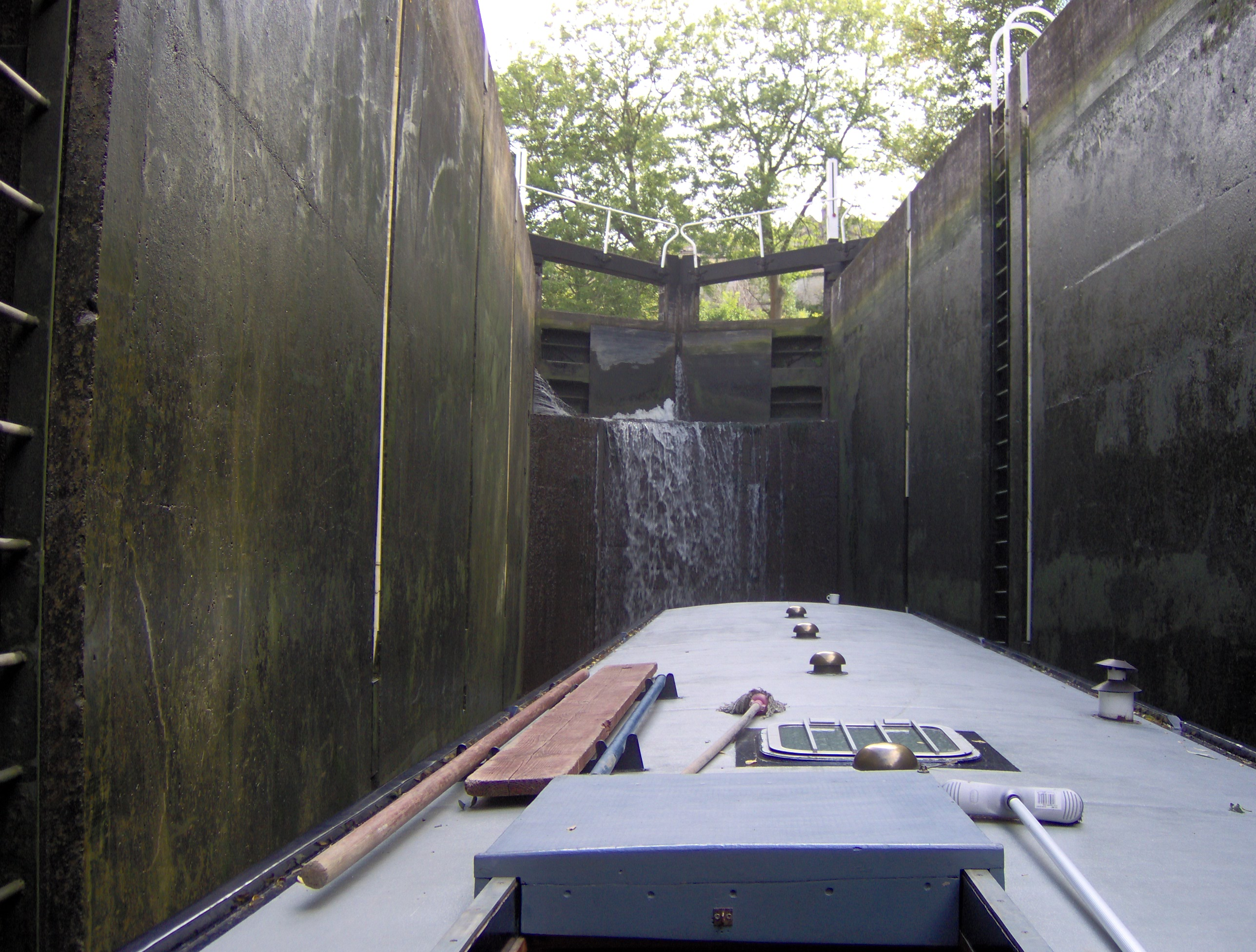
Bath Deep Lock

Bath Locks (grid reference ST756643) are a series of locks, now six locks, situated at the start of the Kennet and Avon Canal, at Bath, England.

Bath Bottom Lock, which is numbered as No. 7 on the canal, is the meeting with the River Avon just south of Pulteney Bridge. Alongside the lock is a side pound and pumping station which pumps water up the locks to replace that used each time the lock is opened.

The next stage is Bath Deep Lock which is numbered 8/9 because two locks were combined when the canal was restored in 1976. A road constructed while the canal was in a state of disrepair passes over the original site of the lower lock. The chamber has a depth of 5.92 metres (19 ft 5 in), making it Britain's second deepest canal lock.

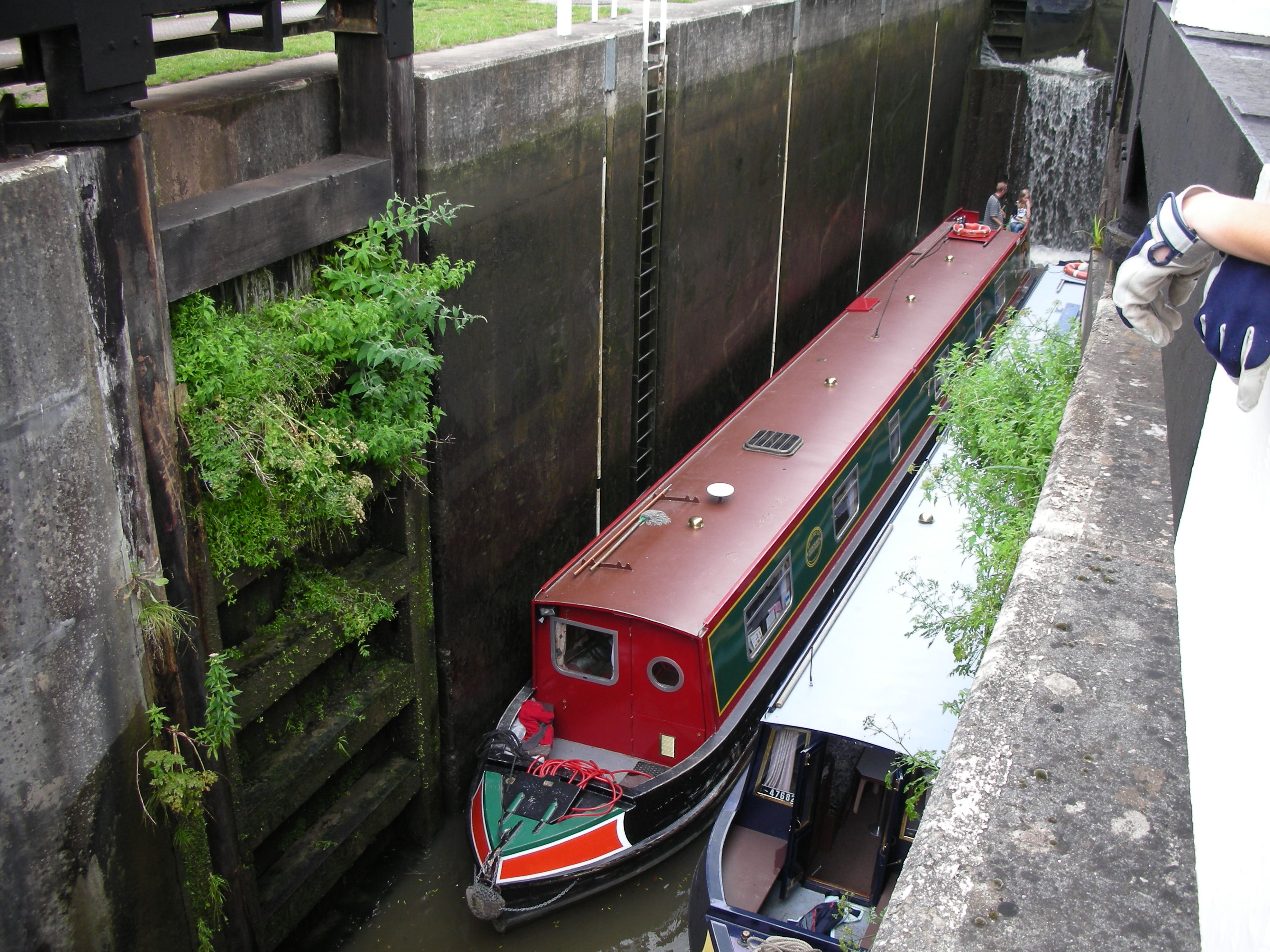
Narrow boats in Bath Deep Lock

Just above the 'deep lock' is an area of water enabling the lock to refill, and above this is Wash House Lock (number 10), followed soon after by Abbey View Lock (number 11) – a Grade II listed structure by which there is another pumping station – and then in quick succession Pulteney Lock (12) and Bath Top Lock (13).

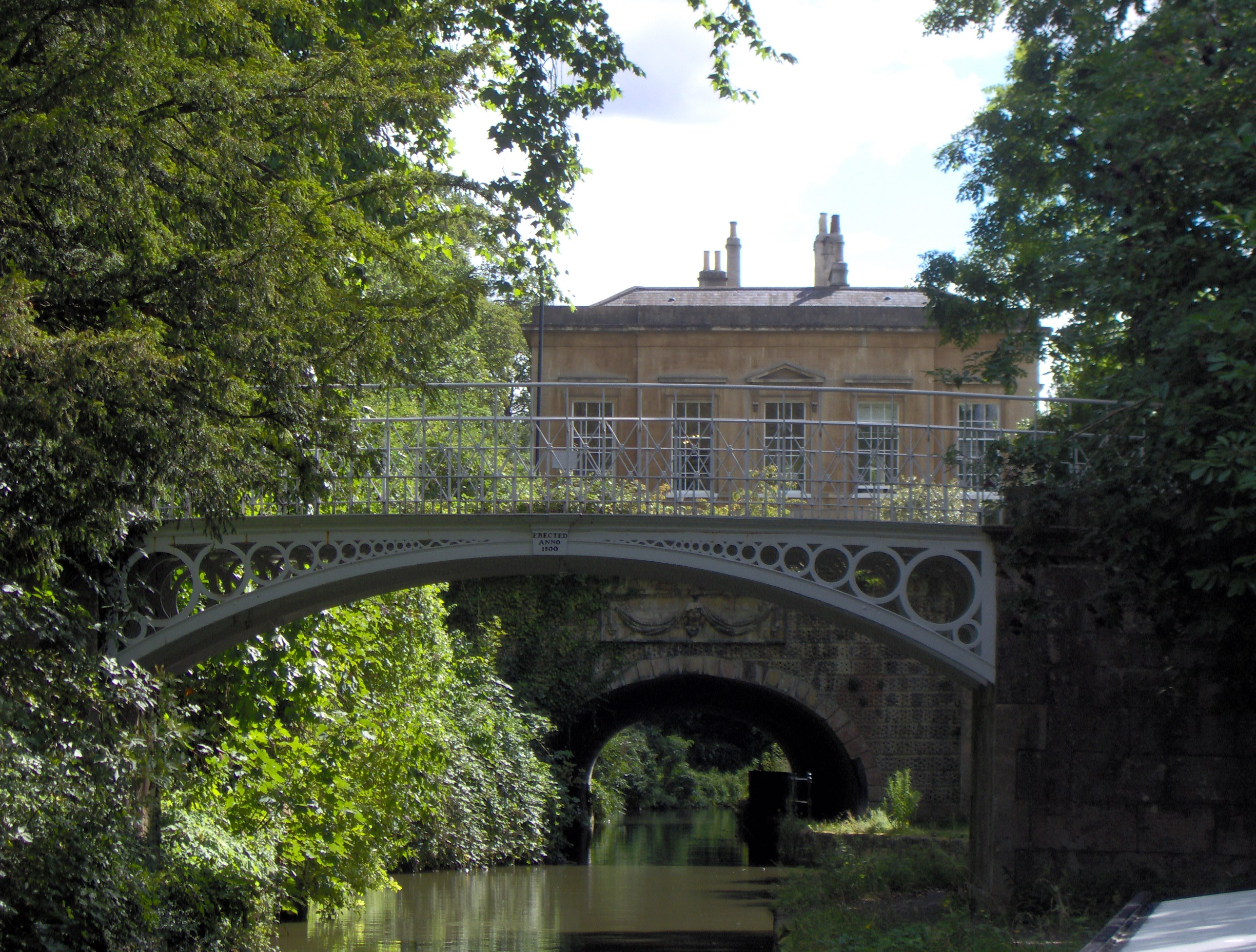
Cleveland House and the cast iron bridges of Sydney Gardens, Bath

Above the top lock, the canal runs through Sydney Gardens where it passes through two tunnels and under two cast iron footbridges dating from 1800. Cleveland tunnel is 52.7 metres (173 ft) long and runs under Cleveland House, the former headquarters of the Kennet and Avon Canal Company. The tunnel is a Grade II* listed structure.

Several of the bridges over the canal are also listed structures.

The locks were restored in 1968 by a collaboration involving staff from British Waterways and volunteer labour organised by the Kennet and Avon Canal Trust.

== See also ==
- List of locks on the Kennet and Avon Canal

Next lock upstream	Kennet and Avon Canal	Next lock downstream
Bradford Lock	Bath Locks; Grid reference: ST756643	Weston Lock
