= Towney Lock =

Lock in England

Coordinates: 51.40775°N 1.12438°W

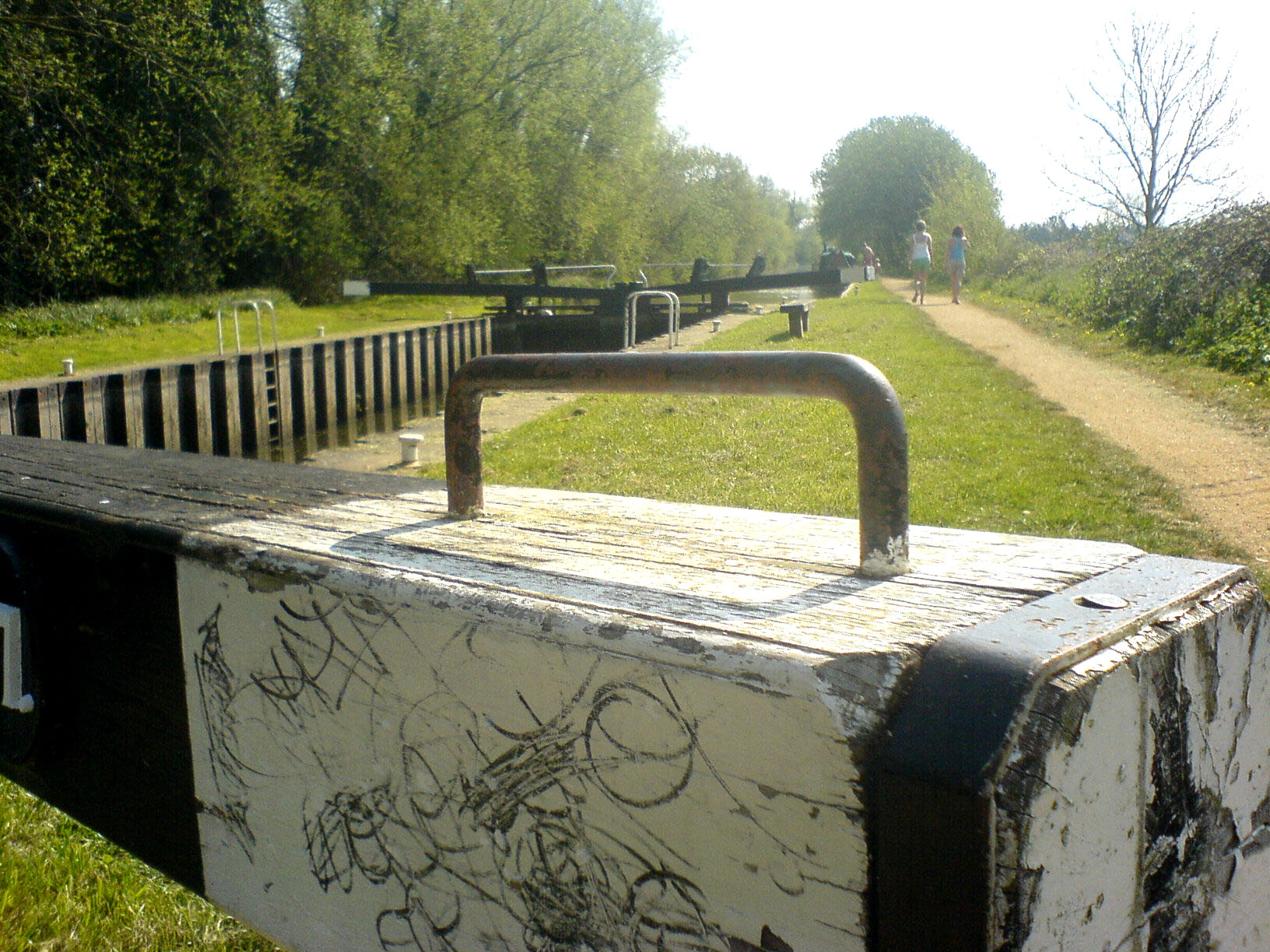
Towney Lock

Towney Lock is a lock on the Kennet and Avon Canal, between Aldermaston Wharf and Sulhamstead, Berkshire, England.

Towney Lock was built between 1718 and 1723 under the supervision of the engineer John Hore of Newbury. The lock has a change in level of 9 ft 8 in (2.95 m).

The lock was deepened during restoration work in the 1970s when Ufton Lock was removed.

The canal is now administered by the Canal & River Trust.

== See also ==
- Locks on the Kennet and Avon Canal

Next lock upstream	River Kennet / Kennet and Avon Canal	Next lock downstream
Padworth Lock	Towney Lock; Grid reference: SU610680	Ufton Lock
