= Swineford =

Hamlet in Gloucestershire England

Coordinates: 51.421°N 2.445°W

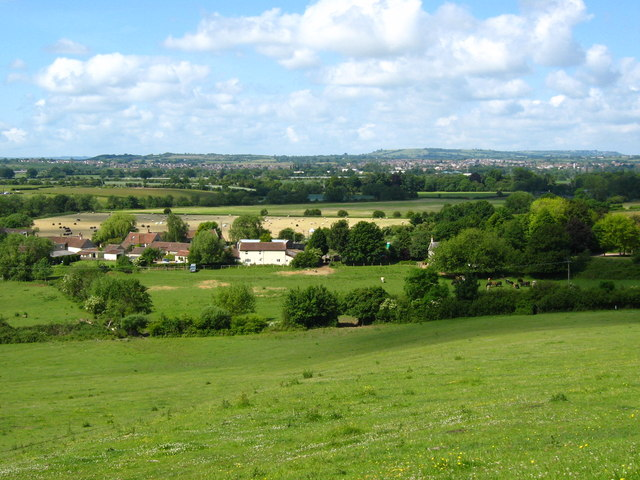

Swineford (pronounced /ˈswɪnfɔːrd/; the e is silent) is a hamlet in South Gloucestershire, England, very close to the boundary with Bath and North East Somerset. It is around 1 km south-east of Bitton on the River Avon, on which Swineford Lock is sited. The A431 road runs through the hamlet.

The name is cognate with that of the German town of Schweinfurt.
