= John Hore =

British engineer

- Born: 13 March 1680 (baptised); Thatcham, Berkshire, England
- Died: 12 April 1763 (aged 83); Thatcham, Berkshire, England
- Resting place: St Mary's Church, Thatcham
- Children: at least one son
- Parents: John Hore; Frances
- Engineering career
- Discipline: Civil engineer (waterways); Surveyor
- Projects: Kennet Navigation; Avon Navigation

John Hore (Note: Alternative spellings of Hore's surname include "Hoar" and "Hoare") (baptised 13 March 1680 – 12 April 1763 (Note: Other sources give Hore's year of birth as 1690, and year of death as 1762)) was an English engineer, best known for making the River Kennet and River Avon navigable. Hore was one of the earliest English canal engineers, and Sir Alec Skempton wrote that he was "in the first rank among the navigation engineers". The Hutchinson Chronology of World History described his work on the Kennet navigation as "[setting] a new standard for inland waterways, and is an important forerunner of the canals of the Industrial Revolution".

== Early life ==
Hore's date of birth is disputed; some sources give his year of birth as 1690, although it is likely he is the same John Hore who was baptised in Thatcham, Berkshire in March 1680. Hore's father, also named John, was possibly a yeoman in Thatcham who became a joint proprietor of the River Kennet, though the family were established and prosperous maltsters in the Newbury area. Hore's mother was Frances. Hore married Hannah Hedges in Thatcham on 25 September 1701.

== Career ==
Hore was recorded as working as a millwright, possibly in relation to the family business. In 1718, however, he was appointed to survey and engineer the River Kennet to make it navigable from Reading to Newbury.

=== Kennet Navigation ===
The 23-mile (37 km) section of river from Reading to Newbury has a gradient of 66 inches per mile (1.1 metres per kilometre), thus requiring locks to traverse the terrain. The Kennet Navigation Act (1715) had allowed construction to begin, although straight away the navigation proprietors saw huge expense in employing "unskillful person[s]"; ten locks were built at mills on the stretch of river but the severe lack of engineering experience meant the quality of the work undertaken was poor and it progressed at an unacceptable rate, thus Hore was appointed engineer and surveyor. It is likely that Hore's father, as a proprietor of the waterway, had a hand in arranging his son's employment on the project.

Hore recognised the inappropriate nature of this solution, proposing more locks and artificial cuttings to be dug. He was subsequently employed on a salary equivalent to £12,000 in 2025 plus expenses, with a responsibility of delivering 18.5 miles (29.8 km) of navigable waterways, 11 miles (18 km) of which would be new cuttings.

Work on the navigation began in 1719, although local opposition the following year threatened works—Mayor of Reading Robert Blake led a 300-strong mob along with the town's recorder to Burghfield where the construction was damaged; Blake owned a wharf near the junction of the Kennet and River Thames, and feared that his trade would be adversely affected by a new waterway. Further setbacks came the following winter, when extraordinary floods damaged the works. In March 1721, an extension to the original timescale was granted. The following July, Hore reported that good progress was being made:

Sheffield and Widmead Cutts are opened, and the two large boats employed raising Colthorp Bank, the dams are made, the screw fixed, and great part of the lock at Aldermaston. I hope next week to begin at Padworth. The locks at Fobney and Southcote are framed, as are the timber work for the two brick locks to be placed in Padworth field except the gates which must be those from the Old Locks when taken up and altered.

— John Hore, July 1721

The screw to which Hore refers is an Archimedes screw, used in the lock excavations to remove water. Despite referring to brick locks in Padworth field, all of Hore's locks in the area—from Aldermaston to Tyle Mill—were turf-sided.

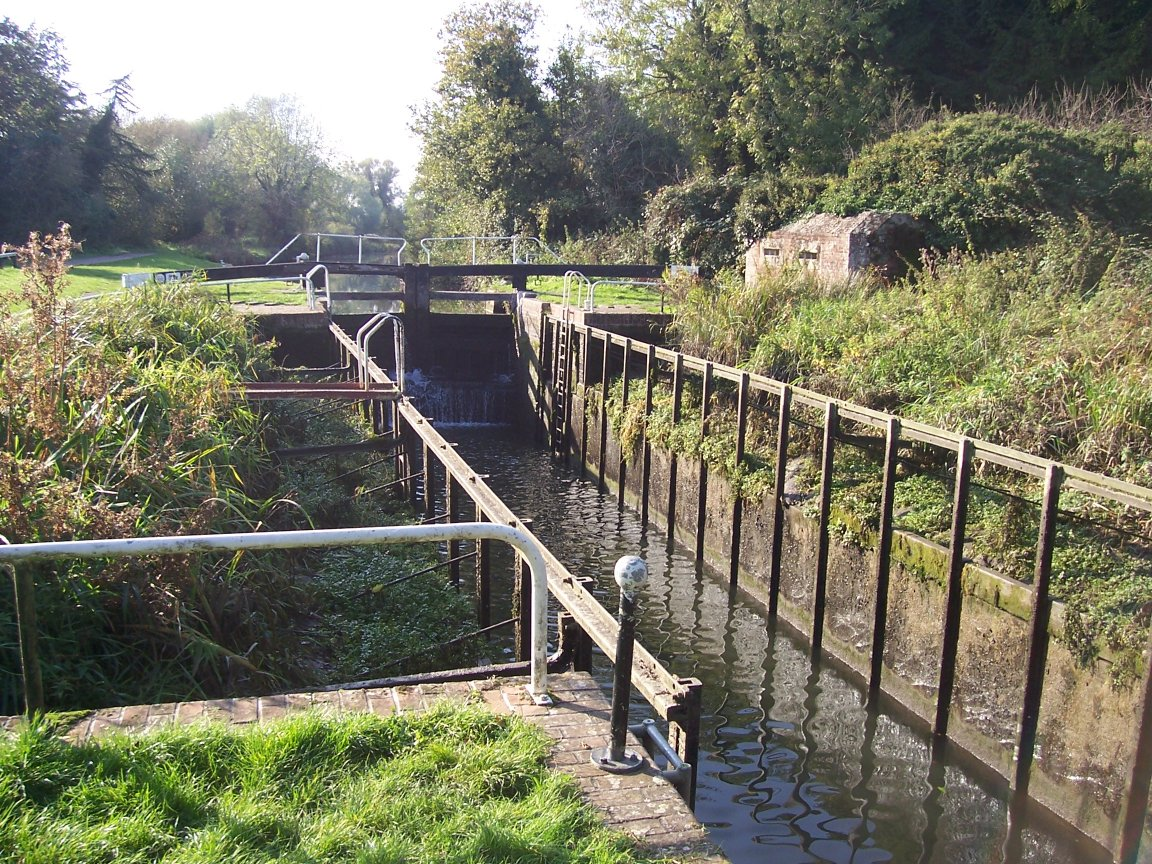
Garston Lock is one of two remaining turf-sided locks on the canal, although it has been reduced in dimensions since its original building

Hore's specifications for the canal defined cutting widths of 54 feet (16 m), with a depth of 5 feet (1.5 m). The navigable sections of river were 70 feet (21 m) wide. The vast majority of Hore's locks were turf-sided (a framed chamber built within sloping sides covered in vegetation); it is likely that Hore was influenced by the turf locks on the Wey Navigation and the Exeter Canal, which predated Hore's project by 70 and 150 years respectively. A small number of locks were built from brick. Hore's lock dimensions were substantial, with a width of 19 feet (5.8 m) and length of 114 feet (35 m) to allow barges carrying loads of over 100 tons.

Hore's work was completed in 1723 (with the towing path usable by the following year), providing a navigable waterway as well as wharves and basins at Aldermaston and Newbury. The Kennet Navigation opened on 1 June 1723 at a cost of approximately £40,000 (equivalent to £7,587,000 in 2025)—although it is speculated that the cost of the towpath itself cost a further £30,000 (equivalent to £5,694,000 in 2025). After the canal's opening, Hore retained his salary and was appointed Surveyor of Works and wharfinger at Newbury as a lifelong position. However, the navigation proprietors (appointed in 1720) dismissed Hore in 1724—he had incurred significant costs from landowners in the early 1720s, and was unable to account for these expenses to the governing body. Despite agreeing to a reimbursement of £840 (equivalent to £156,000 in 2025), the proprietors failed to pay this—and further expenses—to Hore. Hore took the organisation to arbitration in 1731, and by 1734 his salary was reinstated and increased to £100 (equivalent to £20,000 in 2025).

Hore returned to the Kennet after his reinstatement and found it in an extremely poor condition after a few years of neglect. He approached Lady Forbes, widow of one of the navigation's proprietors, who began taking an interest in the navigation's management and ensured that funds were available for necessary repairs. Hore oversaw this work, and by 1740 had established a carpentry at the navigation's centre point in Aldermaston. With the restored navigation, tolls increased to £2,000 per year (equivalent to £337,582 in 2025), with an annual porterage of 10,000 tons.

Hore retired from his role as surveyor on the Kennet in 1761. In 1767, his locks were widened to cater for the larger "Newbury" barges that carried substantial cargoes from Newbury to the Thames.

=== Avon Navigation ===
In March 1725, two years after the opening of the Kennet Navigation, Hore was employed by Ralph Allen in the direction and chief management of the construction of the Avon Navigation near Bristol. He was brought in to implement the 1712 act obtained by the Bath Corporation, which allowed provision for a navigable waterway from Hanham to Bath. Hore was given a salary of approximately £9 per week (equivalent to £1,683 in 2025), and was given budget to employ an assistant—Mr Downs—on a £1 weekly salary (equivalent to £178 in 2025) with responsibility over the project in Hore's absence. Hore's salary on the Avon project was also to cover expenses, which may explain the significant increase from his remuneration on the Kennet Navigation—Hore possibly wanted to avoid a similar situation as arose over personal expenses in the years before beginning the Avon Navigation. In addition to Downs, Hore's chief mason, Edward Marchant, was paid £2 per week (equivalent to £374 in 2025) pro rata.

Upon surveying the waterway, Hore found that the gradient was less than half that of the Kennet in Berkshire, leading to far fewer engineering problems. Numerous mills were operational on the stretch of the Avon, leading Hore to require locks to overcome the change in water level resulting from the mill weirs. Five locks were built to overcome changes of no more than 6 feet (1.8 m), although his requirement of a 600-yard (550 m) cutting near Weston meant that Weston Lock needed a depth of around 9 feet (2.7 m).

Building commenced in mid-1725. Hore experienced a few set-backs, including the compulsory purchase of land at Sydenham Mede near Keynsham, and documentation suggests he was still involved in engineering on the Kennet at Newbury. Upon construction of Keynsham Lock, flooding caused further delays, much to the annoyance of the navigation committee. As a result of this, proprietors Thomas Warr Attwood, Ralph Allen and alderman Francis Bave wrote to Hore, threatening to give more autonomy to Marchant should Hore not expedite his work:

The Water breaks in so fast upon the Low part of our Work at Keynsham that there is an absolute Necessity for the screw or some other Engine to be Erected at that Place. Mr Downs's letter will acquaint you with the Draught of the Three Common Pumps that are now upon that Place wth his Sentements of the additionall helps that is Necessary for the Draining of the Work, but that no disapointment may retard an affair of this Consequence we have sent Mr Marchant on Purpose with this letter who will acquaint you fully with the manner of the obstruction, advise with and be directed by you for the Imediat removall of it, and as the works in that Cut are now in considerable forwardness we must desire that you will soon be with us to direct ye finishing of that and Hanhams Lock, but if your affairs upon the Newbury River will not admit of your speedy attendance here, we must desire you to give Mr Marchant full directions for his Proceeding til we can have your Personal Assistance that our Undertaking may not Suffer by any Unnecessary delays.

— Thomas Warr Attwood, Ralph Allen and Francis Bave, 18 September 1725

The committee also urged Hore to purchase screw engines from the Kennet project, justifying that "this appears to us the Speediest Method" to complete lock work. Hore subsequently came up against problems, mainly with landowners, but also with the committee themselves, who in November 1725 asked Hore to reconsider the location of wharves on the navigation, though probably at the behest of the landowners. Within a week, the committee order the project to be put on hold to allow Hore and Downs to submit detailed plans of the canal between Swineford and Bath. On resuming the project, Hore did not come across any major set-backs and construction finished with the completion of a quay in Bath in December 1727; the navigation construction cost £12,000 (equivalent to £2,115,000 in 2025). The navigation did not include a tow path, however, as disputes arose over land ownership.

Hore's locks on the Avon totalled six, with slightly smaller dimensions than those on the Kennet. However, they were all masonry-walled, and catered for larger cargoes than those on the Kennet—closer to 140 tons. After the completion of the quay at Bath in 1729, tolls on the navigation began averaging just less than £1,000 per year (equivalent to £194,000 in 2025).

=== Stroudwater Navigation ===
In similar circumstances to becoming employed on the Avon Navigation, Hore was approached by a Gloucestershire organistation with a view to linking Stroud to the River Severn by making the River Frome navigable. Hore deemed the natural waterway unsuitable for such a project, instead designing a twelve-lock, 8.5-mile (13.7 km) canal from Framilode to Wallbridge. The canal, which would have catered for 60-ton boats, would cost £20,000 (equivalent to £3,313,000 in 2025) to construct. A bill was put before Parliament, which was supplemented by evidence presented to the Commons and the Lords by Hore in February and March 1730. Although an Act was passed in May 1730, it was met by opposition by a number of millers on the river who would have seen changes in water powering their mills. These millers were given rights over the water usage, which would effectively allow them to shut the navigation for two months per year. This, coupled with the fact that the Act specified for the river to be made navigable (and not for the construction of a separate canal), meant that Hore's recommendations were never realised.

=== Chelmer Navigation ===
Hore surveyed the River Chelmer in 1733 with the intention of creating another river navigation. He proposed two solutions to providing a 14-mile (23 km) link between Maldon and Chelmsford—making the river navigable and cutting a new canal. Although the cost of creating a new canal—£12,800 (equivalent to £2,635,000 in 2025)—was 30% more expensive than working on the river, Hore strongly recommended its implementation. Much like his work on the Stroudwater, plans were not adopted.

=== Other works ===
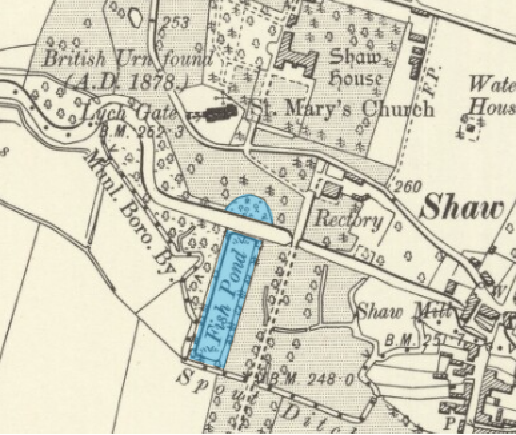
In 1733, Hore worked on the ornamental canal and basin (highlighted) at Shaw House in his hometown of Newbury

In 1733, Hore was appointed by James Brydges, 1st Duke of Chandos, to work on the grounds at his Shaw House estate in Newbury. The garden already featured two ornamental canals, fed from the nearby River Lambourn, though the Duke employed Hore to combine the canals, enlarging them into a single canal with a cascade. Hore's work here also included a 147-foot (45 m) semi-circular canal on the north side of the river.

== Later life and death ==
According to his will, drawn up in 1753, Hore was living at Ham Mills in Thatcham, and he was to leave his land, property and shares connected with the River Kennet to his sister-in-law, Ann Cook. Hore died on 12 April 1763, and was buried at St Mary's Church, Thatcham on 16 April.

== Legacy ==
Although Hore's proposals for navigable waterways at Stroudwater and Chelmer were never adopted, both waterways were eventually made suitable for traffic. In the 1770s, Thomas Dadford Jr. and John Priddy (who had worked alongside James Brindley on the construction of the Staffordshire and Worcestershire and Droitwich Canals respectively) surveyed the route which was constructed by Priddy and Edmund Lingard between 1776 and 1779. Similarly, the Chelmer was finally made navigable between 1793 and 1797 by John Rennie. Shortly after this, Rennie worked on the Kennet and Avon Canal, linking Hore's two sections of navigable river with a canal from Bath to Newbury. L. T. C. Rolt writes that Hore had a son who became resident engineer on Rennie's project to build a canal linking the Kennet and Avon navigations.

In the decades after Rennie's Kennet and Avon Canal opened, Hore's wide locks on the Kennet Navigation were narrowed to match the standardised 14-foot (4.3 m) locks on the newer waterway. This work used Great Western Railway broad-gauge rails and sleepers (made available after the "gauge war") to rebuild the lock chambers.

Two of Hore's turf-sided locks on the Kennet Navigation still exist—Monkey Marsh Lock, near Thatcham, and Garston Lock, near Theale. Despite both having been restored over the lifetime of the canal, Garston retains more authenticity as the entire chamber remains turfed. A number of Hore's locks were entirely rebuilt when the canal was restored; in the cases of the locks at Towney and Burghfield, the new locks were built immediately upstream of Hore's locks, which were de-gated and left as narrow cuttings.

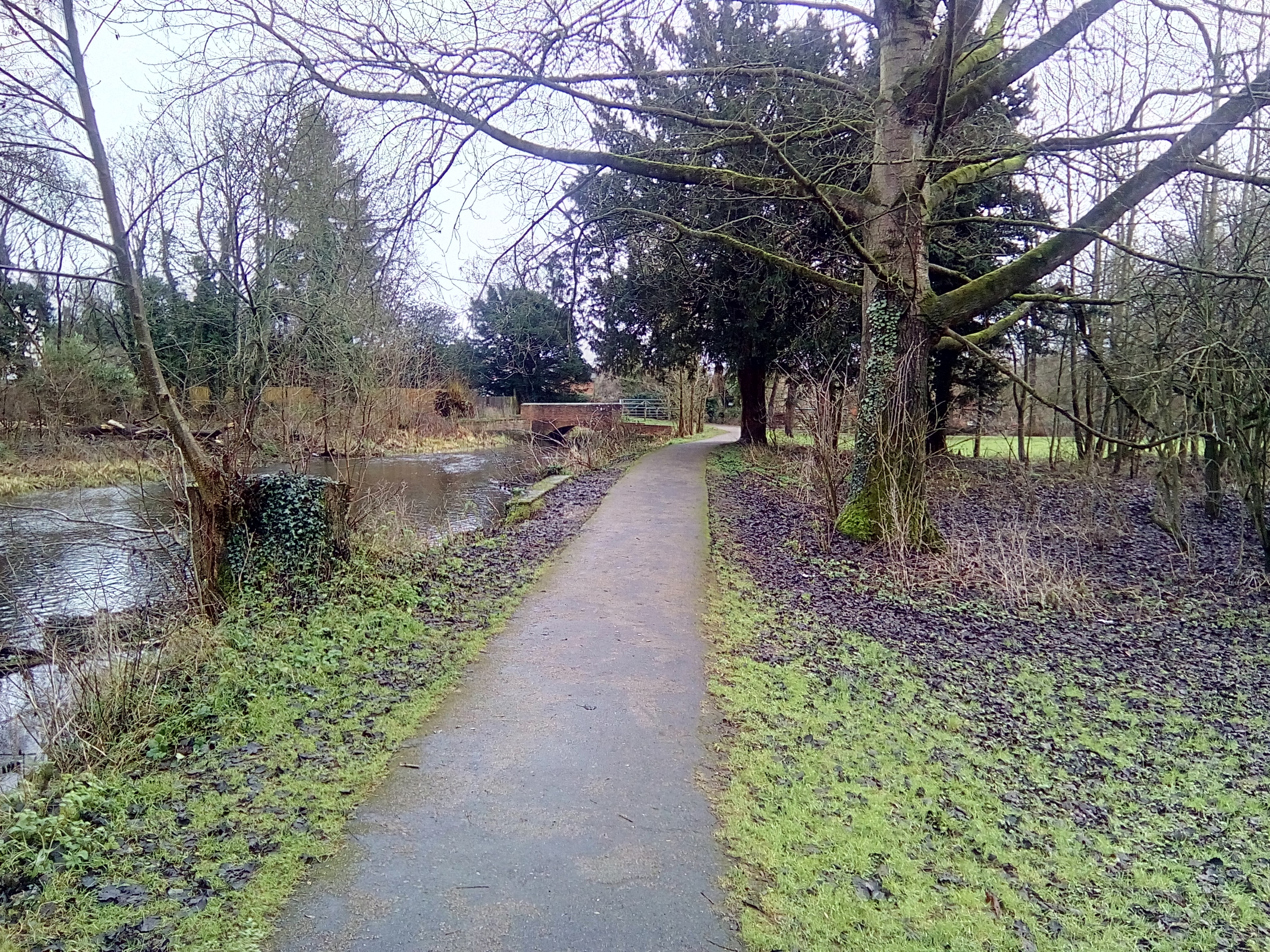
The sloping ground to the right of the path marks the northern end of the ornamental canal at Shaw House. To the left of the path, the masonry work is the location of the ornamental cascade between the canal and the River Lambourn

Hore's ornamental canal work at Shaw House was largely filled in by the 1970s, when the A339 road was built. The southern end of the canal was levelled, although a depression in the ground beside the River Lambourn path shows the position of the north end of the canal.

In his 1953 work The Engineers of the English River Navigations 1620–1760 for the Newcomen Society journal, Sir Alec Skempton described Hore as "in the first rank among the navigation engineers". In the Hutchinson Chronology of World History, Hore's work on the Kennet is described as "[setting] a new standard for inland waterways, and is an important forerunner of the canals of the Industrial Revolution".

Despite praise for Hore's work on the waterways, William Fordyce Mavor recognised that even by the 1810s—when Rennie's canal was completed—Hore's name and association with the navigations had disappeared into "oblivion". Mavor stated that Hore's legacy needed rescuing, noting that he had "adopted and executed a navigation, of which [Mavor believed] there then existed no model in England".

== See also ==
- Canals of the United Kingdom
- History of the British canal system
