= Warleigh =

Hamlet in Somerset, England

Coordinates: 51.401°N 2.302°W

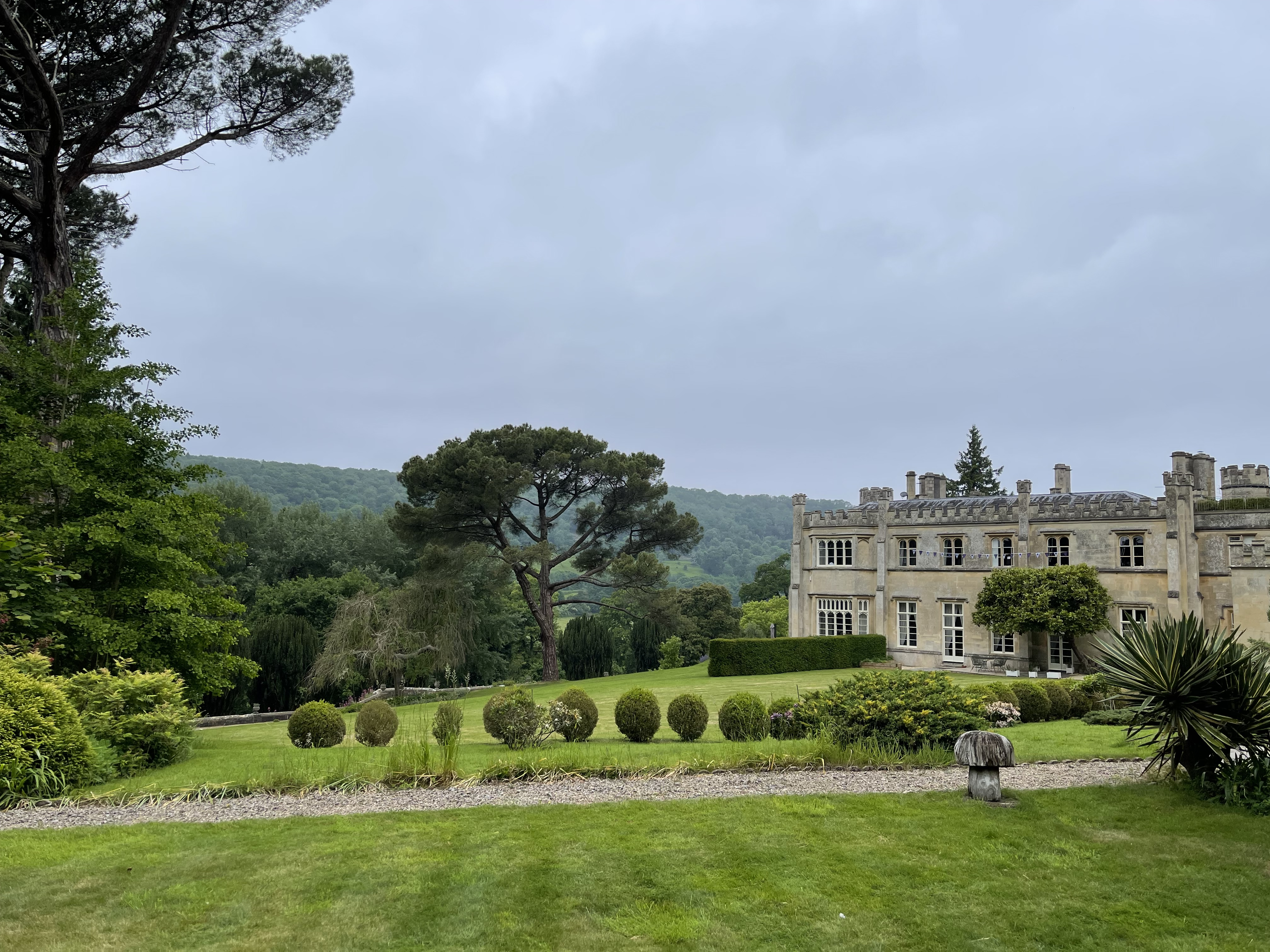
- Warleigh Manor

- Location within Somerset
- Population: 336
- OS grid reference: ST792645
- Unitary authority: Bath and North East Somerset
- Ceremonial county: Somerset
- Region: South West
- Country: England
- Sovereign state: United Kingdom
- Post town: BATH
- Postcode district: BA1
- Dialling code: 01225
- Police: Avon and Somerset
- Fire: Avon
- Ambulance: South Western
- UK Parliament: Bath

Warleigh is a hamlet in the civil parish of Bathford, in the Bath and North East Somerset district, in the ceremonial county of Somerset, England. It lies 2.5 miles (4 km) east of Bath, on the River Avon, it is primarily known as the location of Warleigh Weir and Warleigh Manor.

== History ==
=== Warleigh Manor ===
The Skrine family lived at Warleigh from 1643. The present Warleigh Manor was built in 1815 as a country house for Henry Skrine (d.1853); his father Henry Skrine (d.1803) was known for his writings on his travels in Great Britain. John Webb, a Staffordshire architect, designed the house in the revivalist Tudor style.

Skrines owned the house for the next seven generations; it was altered and extended in 1907. The building was designated as Grade II* listed in 1956 as an early example of the Tudor revival. In the same year, the contents were sold and the house and its stable block were occupied by a series of educational establishments: Rodbourne College, Bathford College, and Warleigh Manor School. In 1999, it was renovated and converted into residential units.

Close to the house are the former stables (around three sides of a courtyard) and the former orangery. Both are of the same period as the house – early to mid 19th century – and are now in residential use.

=== Warleigh Weir ===
Warleigh Weir was originally built to supply a head of water from the Avon to a gristmill in Claverton. The weir was raised by 12 inches between 1809 and 1813 as part of the construction program for the Claverton Pumping Station, built on the site of the mill.

The weir is not publicly accessible from Warleigh, although previously a ferryman operated from Ferry Cottage in Warleigh to the river island, at least until the 1950s. The weir can be accessed from a bridge on the Claverton side of the river. The weir and the bridge to the island are both owned by the Canal & River Trust.

Today the weir is a popular wild swimming spot and has been for at least 100 years.

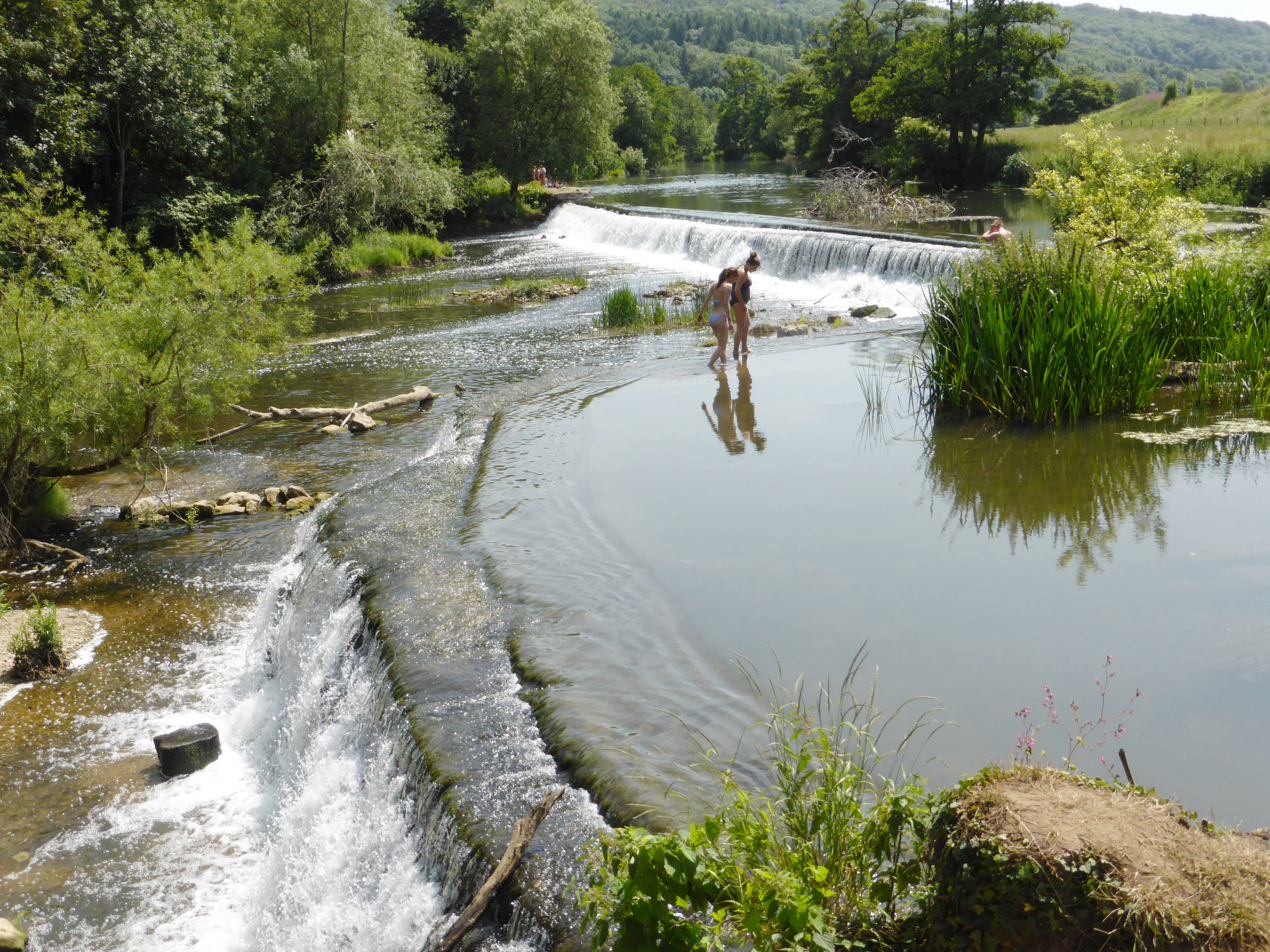
Swimmers at Warleigh Weir
