= Warleigh Weir =

Weir on the Avon near Bath

Coordinates: 51.3769°N 2.3003°W

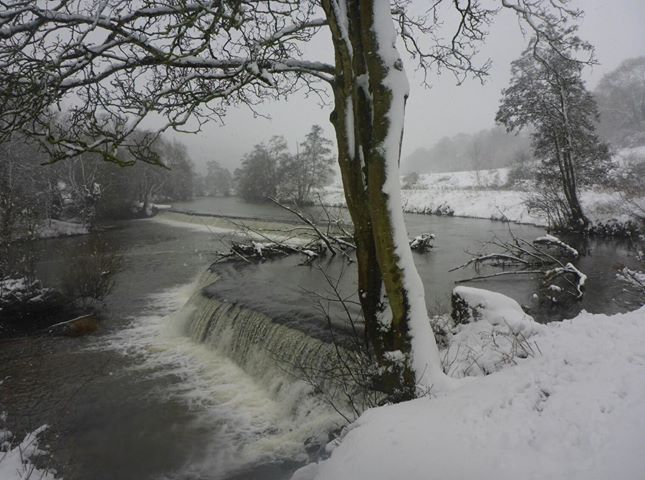
Warleigh Weir after snow

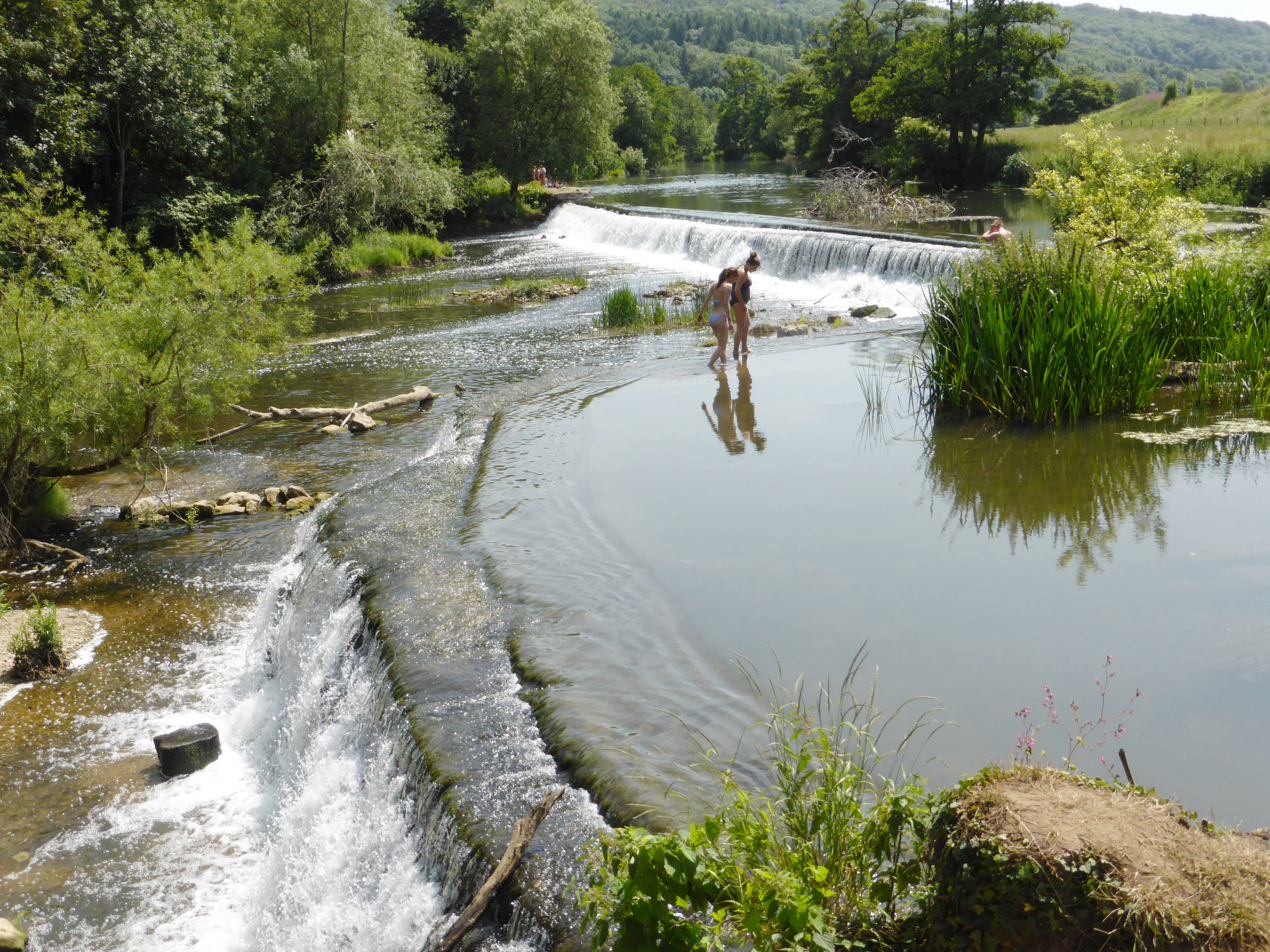
Swimmers at the weir

Warleigh Weir is a river structure at Warleigh on the River Avon in Somerset, England, upstream from the city of Bath. The weir was originally built to supply a head of water to a grist mill at Claverton. The weir was subsequently raised by a height of 12 inches between 1809 and 1813 as part of the construction program for the Claverton Pumping Station, which sits on the site of the old grist mill.

The weir is accessed from the adjacent island which is created from the bifurcation of the river running to the Claverton Pumping station and the main flow of the River Avon. The weir and the bridge to the island are both owned by the Canal & River Trust.

== Recreation ==
Warleigh Weir has been a popular local swimming spot for over 100 years. The river island—typically used to access the weir—is privately owned and is designated agricultural land. There is a public footpath across the field, to the old Ferry Steps, but not to the weir itself. The landowners argue that there is "no right of public access to the land", although as the land is uncultivated downland it may fall within the Countryside and Rights of Way Act 2000, which established freedom to roam in the UK.

== Safety ==
Swimming at a weir is highly dangerous due to the hydraulic jump as water flows over the weir. Even when the water is calm on the surface, dangerous undercurrents can permanently hold swimmers under the surface. For these reasons the Environment Agency warns against any swimming near weirs.

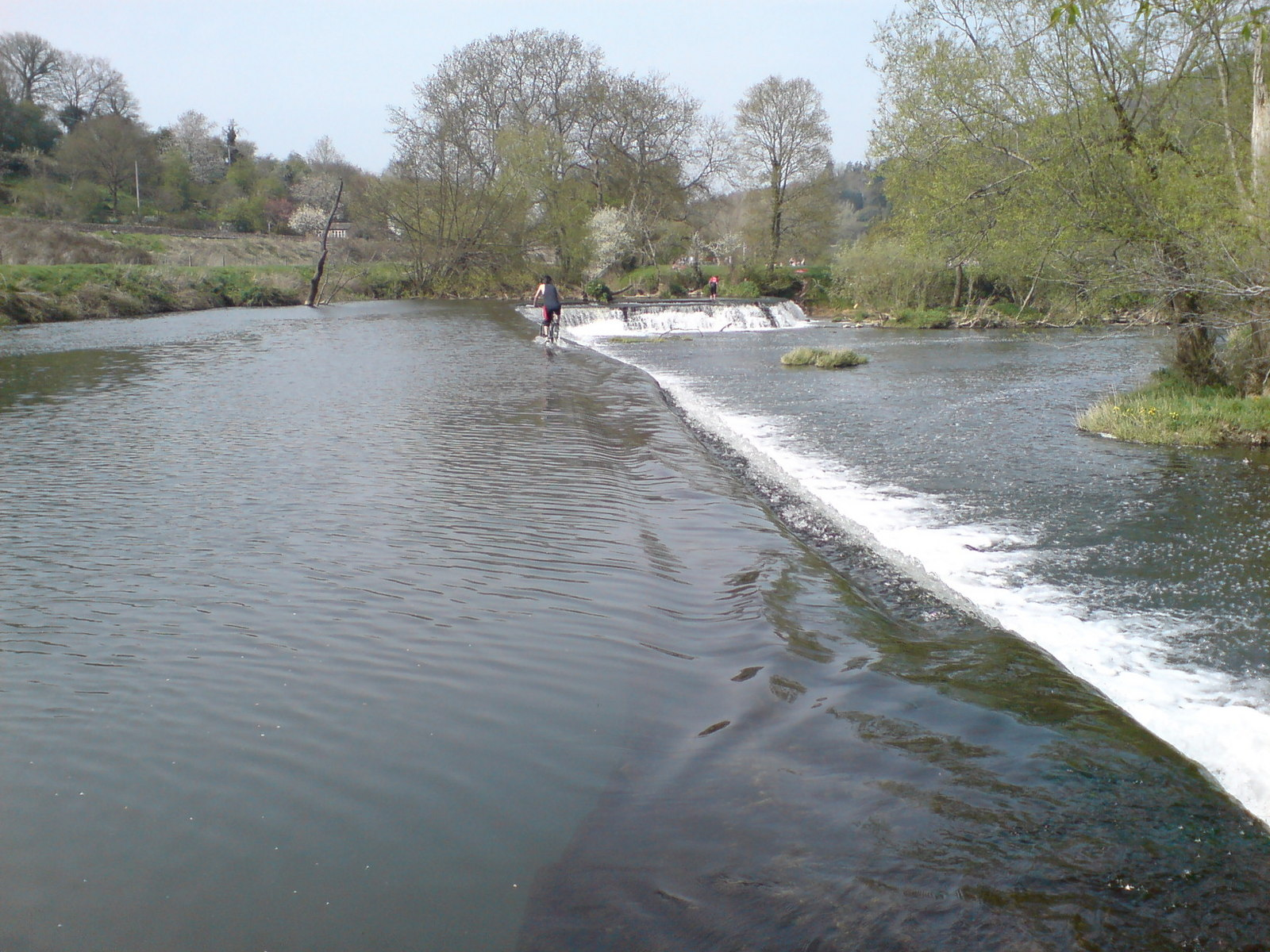
The weir looking south

There have been reported incidents of Weil's disease in the river. Repeated warnings have been issued by the Canal & River Trust and the Warleigh Weir Project around the dangers of swimming at the site. The Warleigh Weir Project website states:

The Warleigh Weir, Island Field and River Avon are not safe places. This is working agricultural land which presents various hazards and risks. The river is not a designated swimming spot, there are no lifeguards and there may be no assumption of safety at the site whatsoever.

== Land ownership and Warleigh Weir project ==
The land adjacent to the weir was used for cattle grazing until June 2018, when the land was purchased by the Warleigh Island Conservation Project Ltd, a business owned by Autonomous Investments Holdings Limited. The Warleigh Weir Project was founded to "promote the responsible and sustainable use of the countryside".

== Designated Bathing Water status ==
In the summer of 2019, the island owner made it known that they intend to apply to make the swimming area at Warleigh Weir the first designated river bathing water in the United Kingdom under the Bathing Water Regulations 2013. However, according to DEFRA rules, this application must be supported by the local council. As of 2021, no application appears to have been made, and meanwhile Ilkley Wharf in Yorkshire became the first UK river site to achieve designated bathing water status.

In August 2022, raw sewage was released just upstream, setting back landowner Johnny Palmer's attempts to gain bathing water status.

== Controversy ==
In 2019, the owner of the land adjacent to the weir threatened to close their land to the public "unless people stop leaving their rubbish behind". However, total closure of field would not be legal as would block the public right of way across the land to the old ferry steps. A sign was also erected in 2019 that incorrectly claimed that there is no public right of access across the land. During the COVID-19 pandemic of 2020 the site was again closed due to island users not adhering to social distancing rules. Currently, the site remains open and is managed by the Warleigh Weir Project Guardians, a group of volunteers who assist with promoting the project values, making site improvements, and cleaning the site.

In 2020 a body was found in the river.
