= Church of St Nicholas, Bathampton =

Church in Somerset, England

Church of St Nicholas
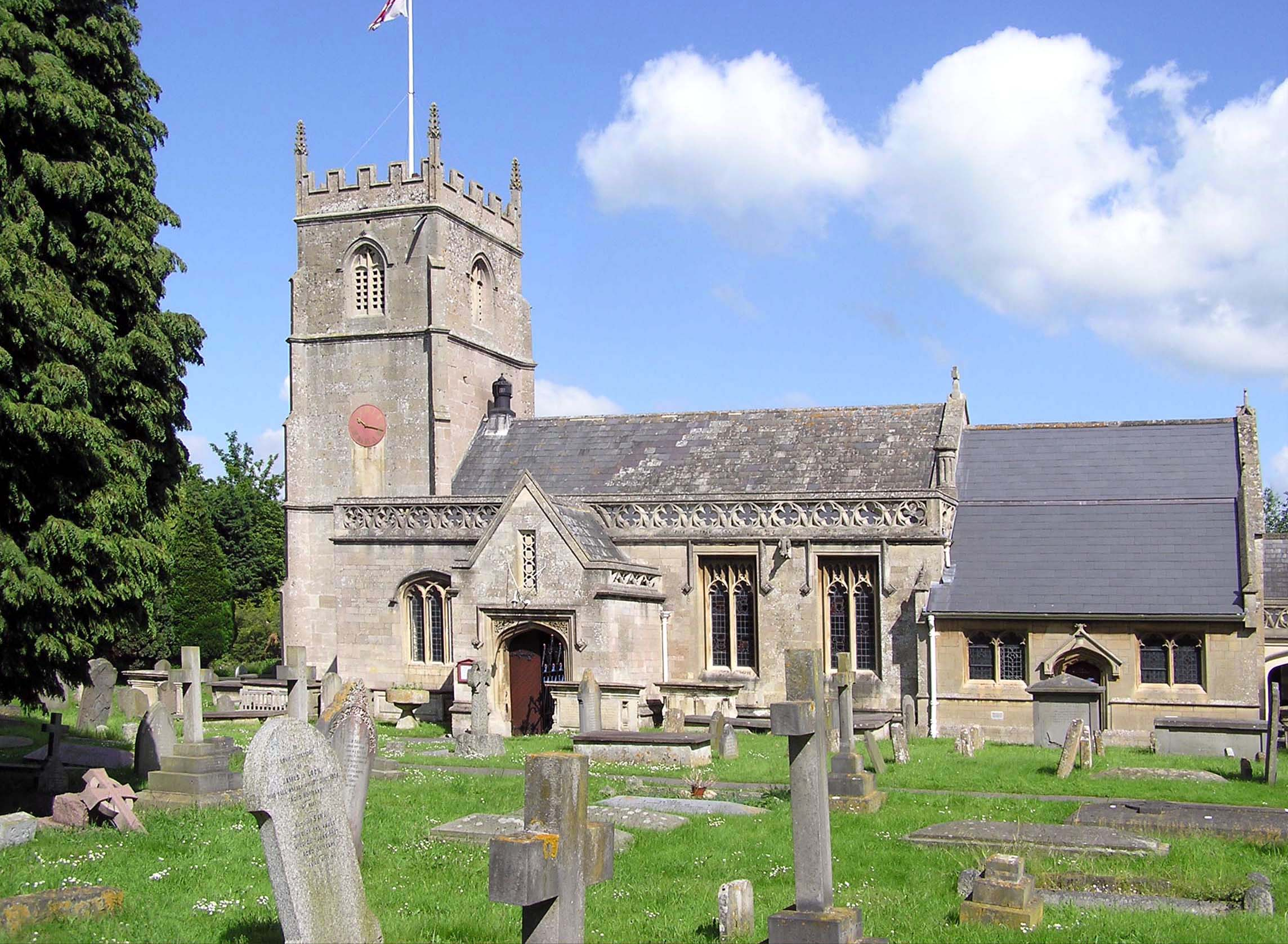

- Location within Somerset
- 51°23′51″N 2°19′18″W
- Location: Bathampton, Somerset.

Site notes
- Website: stnicholasbathampton.org

Listed Building – Grade II*
- Designated: 1 February 1956
- Reference no.: 1320551

The Church of St Nicholas is an Anglican parish church in Bathampton, Somerset, standing between the River Avon and the Kennet and Avon Canal. Built in the 13th century, with a 15th-century tower and 18th and 19th century restorations, it has been designated as a Grade II* listed building. The church is particularly noted for its Australia Chapel, which commemorates Admiral Arthur Phillip, the first Governor of New South Wales, who was buried there in 1814, while the churchyard contains several other significant tombs.

The parish is part of the benefice of Bathampton with Claverton.

== History ==
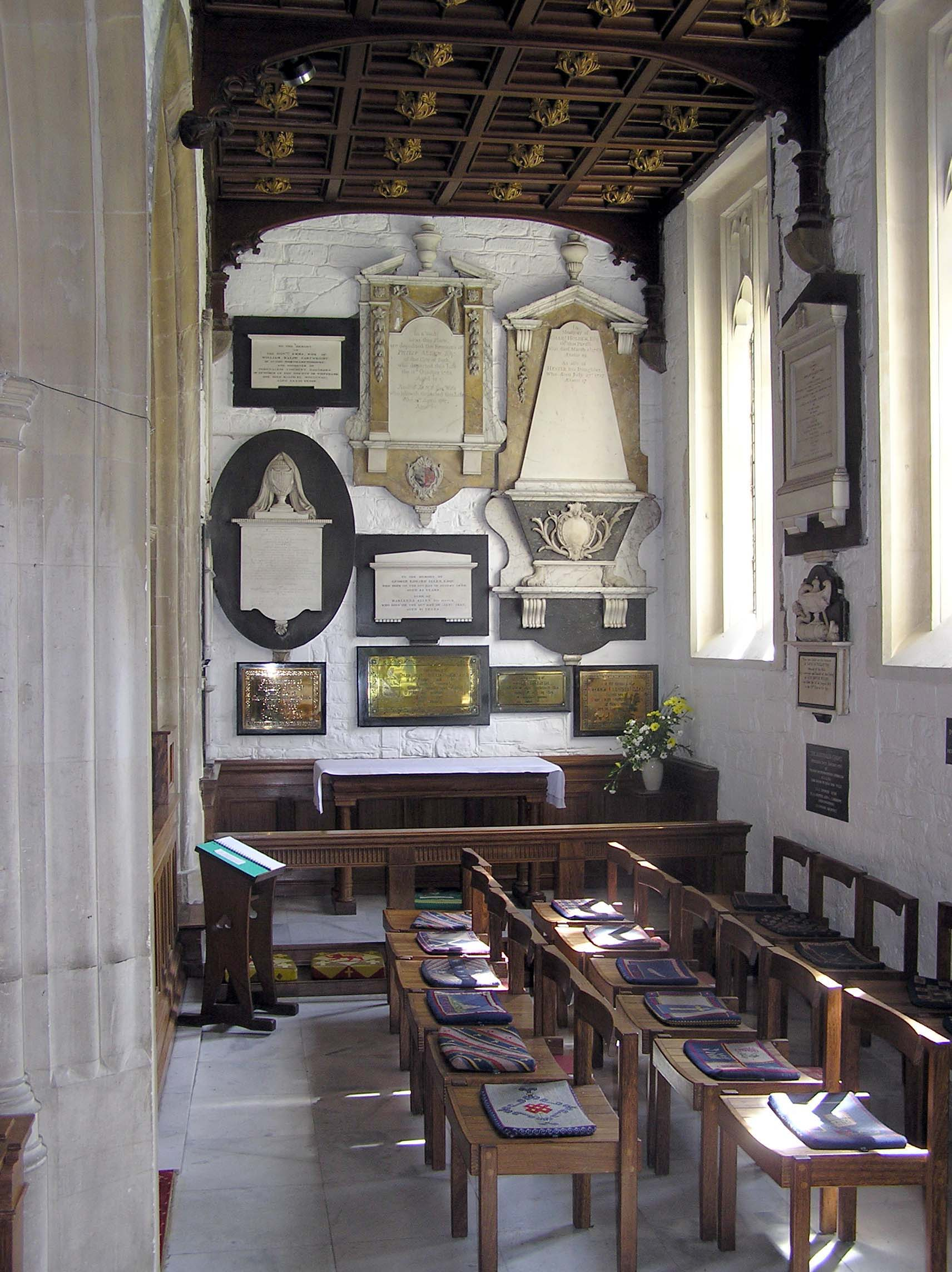
The Australia Chapel

=== Pre-Reformation ===
Bathampton was granted in around 940 by King Edmund I to Bath Abbey, but it is likely that the first church was constructed shortly after the Norman Conquest. Installed in the outside wall of the chancel is an effigy, probably of St Nicholas, who is depicted in late 11th century episcopal garb. It is believed that the church originally had a central tower, while a piscina and gable cross (since replicated) survived into the Victorian era. Early records are lacking, but the first vicar is recorded in 1261, while a vicarage was ordained in 1317. The Black Death had a significant impact on the church, with five different vicars serving the parish between 1348 and 1349, several of whom likely died.

During the 15th century, it was altered with a chapel being added in 1500 and tower in 1532.

=== Reformation ===
The Reformation had a mixed impact on the church. Richard Gibbons serving as vicar from 1527 to 1567, throughout the mid-Tudor reformations, while the bells, produced in 1540, bore the names of St Thomas and St Lucy. Nonetheless, the patronage of the church passed from Bath Abbey to Bristol Cathedral in 1539, in whose hands it remains, while two statuettes were concealed in the chancel wall, only being recovered some centuries later. Indeed, when Mary I returned England briefly to Roman Catholicism, the church had already disposed of its Catholic service books. Little happened in the subsequent two centuries, excepting the consolidation of the Vicarage of Bathampton with that of Bathford around 1663.

=== Rebuilding ===
In 1754-5, Ralph Allen rebuilt most of the church in a Gothic style, after he acquired Bathampton Manor in 1731, adding a family chapel adjoining the south of the nave. During this process, many medieval features were lost, and the late 14th century statues of a knight and his lady were put in the churchyard. This may account for the medieval font being outside the porch as well.

With the appointment of the Rev'd E.D. Rhodes in 1855, Bathampton was separated from Bathford, and the church was restored and expanded with the addition of a north aisle and a small vestry in 1858 by Major C.E. Davis, an organ chamber in 1879, a south aisle and new porch in 1882, and enlarged vestry in 1897.

In 1904, a cross was erected in the churchyard to commemorate the Coronation, and has had plaques for each coronation and jubilee since. By the main door are the memorials to those in the village who died in World War I and World War II.

=== Recent History ===
In 1974, the South Aisle, containing the former Allen Chapel, was renovated in 1975 to become the Australia Chapel to commemorate Admiral Arthur Phillip, the first Governor of New South Wales, who was buried there in 1814. The chapel gained a floor of Australian Wombeyan Marble, a memorial screen of Australian Blackbean wood, kneelers from Tasmania and stained glass of the coats of arms of the Federal Government and all six states in the windows. It was dedicated in 1975 by the Rt Rev'd E.B. Henderson, Bishop of Bath and Wells, while there is a special service near 11 October, the date of Arthur Phillip’s birth, each year to commemorate his life, in which the Australian High Commissioner lays a wreath on his grave.

=== Burials ===
Buried in the churchyard is the body of Adolphe, Viscount du Barry, a relative of Madame du Barry, who was killed in a duel on Claverton Down with his acquaintance Captain Rice, after an argument over cards.

Other notable local figures, such as William Harbutt, Kenneth Murchison and Walter Sickert, are also buried there, while many of the chest tombs designated as listed buildings.

== List of Clergy ==
- 1261: John
- 1297: Alan
- 1308: Roger
- 1314: Henry of Foleham
- 1317: William of Walcot
- 1326: John of Badmynton
- 1342: John Brown
- 1348: William le Vynour
- 1348: John Herberd
- 1349: John of Walcot
- 1349: Nicholas of Carssecombe
- 1362: William Eode
- 1407: John Stafford
- 1410: Phillip ap Wyllyn
- 1411: Walter Clyve
- 1413: John Barker
- 1420: Thomas Bateyn
- 1420: William Fitz Rauf
- 1421: Henry Coventre
- 1427: Thomas Keynesham
- 1451: William Crosse
- 1459: Gregory Rothymberg
- 1464: William Barry
- 1465: Hugh Baker
- 1467: Roger Crump
- 1474: Thomas Stevyn
- 1474: Thomas Portman
- 1483: Henry Harwode
- 1487: William Biconal
- 1493: Thomas Rundel
- 1500: John Fox
- 1501: Thomas Cogan
- 1527: Richard Gibbons
- 1567: Richard Houseman
- 1571: Matthew Pickering
- 1577: Thomas Powell
- 1606: Ludovicus Jones
- 1620: Owen Lewis
- 1664: John Doling
- 1670: Nathaniel Masters
- 1670: Thomas Snead
- 1684: Richard Roberts
- 1684: William Jones
- 1695: William Heath
- 1741: Thomas Symmons
- 1766: Thomas Chapman
- 1776: John Berjew
- 1790: John Camplin
- 1794: John Chapman
- 1816: Richard Bedford
- 1824: James Carter
- 1855: Robert Hancock
- 1856: Edward Duncan Rhodes
- 1866: Henry Girdlestone
- 1896: Launcelot John Fish
- 1908: Stanley Forster Brown
- 1908: John George
- 1912: Henry Gibbon
- 1917: Frederick White
- 1927: Richard David Williams
- 1934: Clyde William Jacob
- 1938: John Hugh Homer Green
- 1946: Edward Claud Childs
- 1960: Edgar Sydney Landen
- 1966: Gordon Charles Craig Spencer
- 1981: Michael Gordon William Hayes
- 1988: Oliver James Drummond Bayley
- 1996: Paul Burden
- 2015: Jonty Frith

== Present Day ==
The church is open for public services every Sunday at 10:45am, with groups for children and youth, and Zoom provision. The church is active in the local community with the Bridge, a Thursday morning group for young and old to mix, and mid-week home-groups to study the Bible.

== See also ==
- List of ecclesiastical parishes in the Diocese of Bath and Wells
