= Bathampton Toll Bridge =

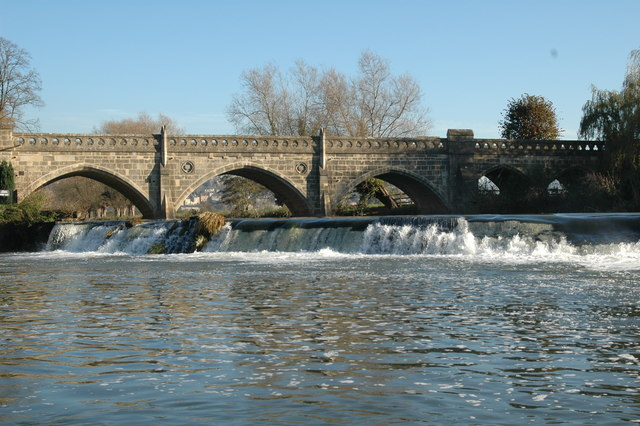
- Toll Bridge and weir
- Coordinates: 51.4015°N 2.3256°W
- Carries: Motor vehicles, pedestrians and bicycles
- Crosses: River Avon
- Locale: Batheaston to Bathampton, Somerset, England

Characteristics
- Design: Arch bridge
- Material: Bath stone
- No. of spans: Nine

History
- Constructed by: Hickes and Isaac
- Opened: 1872

Statistics
- Toll: £0.50 Motorcycles; £1.20 Cars; £1.50 Vans; £2.00 Buses

Location
- Interactive map of Bathampton Toll Bridge

Bathampton Toll Bridge is an arch bridge in England, carrying a minor road across the River Avon near Bathampton, to the east of Bath. It is a Grade II listed structure.

The bridge was built of Bath stone by Hickes and Isaac in 1872, for the Bridge Company Turnpike Trust. It has nine pointed arches: three larger ones in the centre and three smaller ones at either end. The north end was built over an earlier bridge and mill leat. The first version of the bridge was built in the 1850s and replaced a ford and ferry.

The road over the bridge between Batheaston and Bathampton is single-track with give way signs. On the Bathampton side to the south of the river, the road crosses three further bridges. The first is a modern bridge over the dual-carriageway Batheaston/Swainswick Bypass which is part of the A4. The second crosses the Great Western Main Line and the final bridge is over the Kennet and Avon Canal.

The toll house was built at the same time as the bridge and is also Grade II listed. It is a two storey building with a high pitch slate roof. A board advertising the historical toll prices is still in place.

In 2021, it had the tenth highest revenue of UK toll bridges, with a revenue of over £1 million. The bridge is owned by the General Estates Company, who also own Whitchurch Bridge, a toll bridge across the River Thames.

== Gallery ==
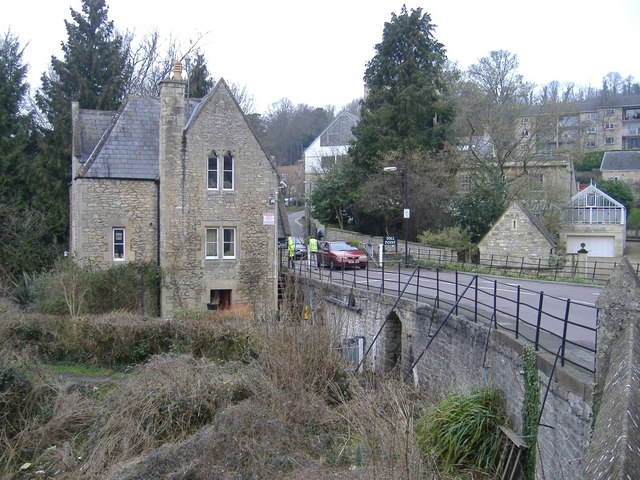
The Toll House

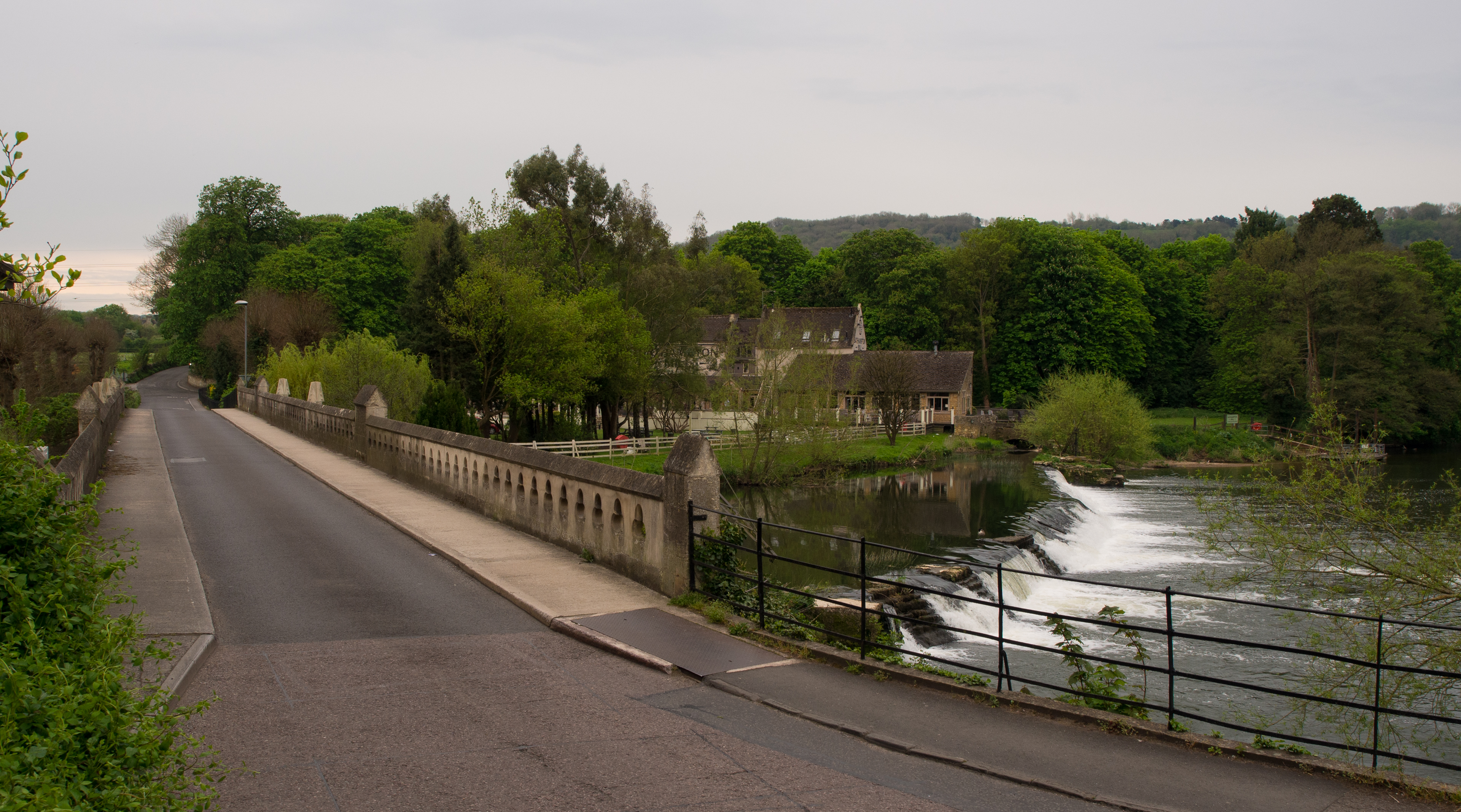
The bridge road

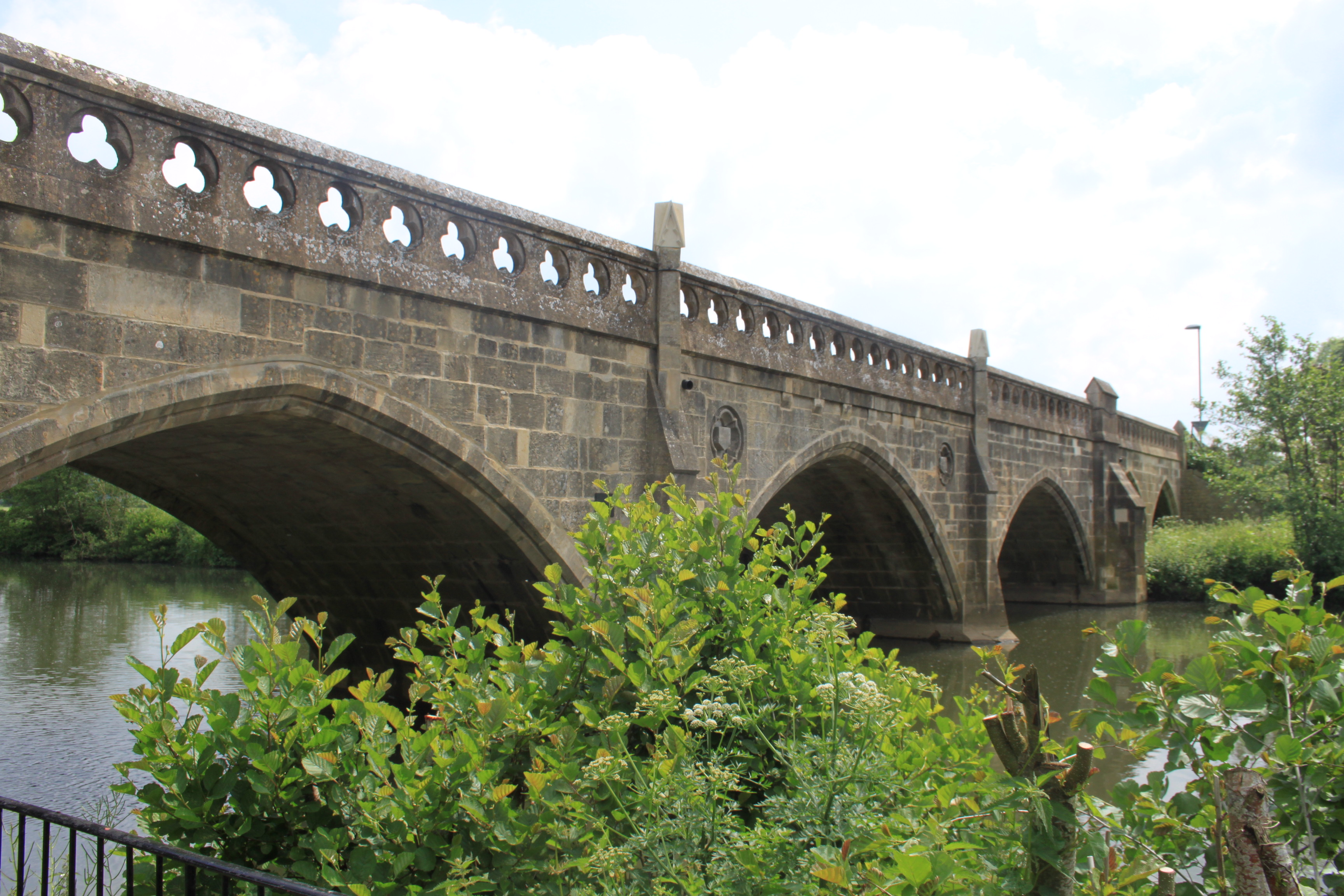
Close up of bridge
