= General Estates Company =

- Type: Private
- Industry: Various
- Founded: October 1900; 126 years ago
- Headquarters: Hythe, Hampshire, United Kingdom
- Website: general-estates.co.uk

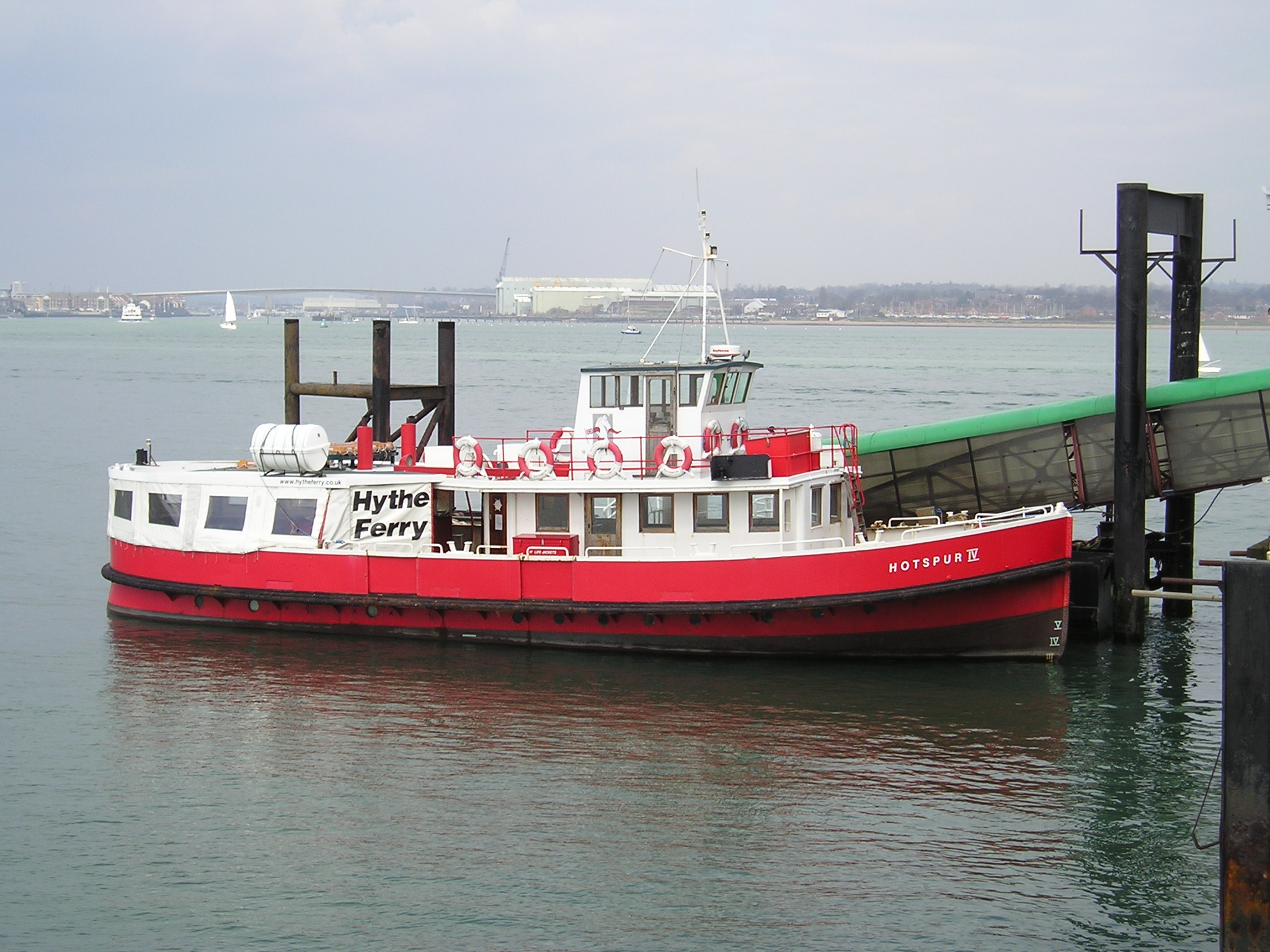
A Hythe ferry still carrying the Hotspur name in 2004

The General Estates Company is a privately held company registered in the United Kingdom and incorporated in October 1900. Its current businesses include the provision of mobile home parks, and ownership and operation of toll bridges.

The company's head office is located in Hythe in Hampshire. The proprietors of the company are members of the Percy family, whose lineage also includes the Dukes of Northumberland and Henry Percy or Hotspur.

== Current operations ==
The company runs 21 mobile home parks in southern England. It also owns and operates toll bridges, including:

- Whitchurch Bridge, across the River Thames west of Reading
- Bathampton Toll Bridge, across the River Avon east of Bath
- Dunham Bridge, across the River Trent north of Newark (partial stake)

== History ==
The origins of the company lie with the Hythe Ferry, a passenger ferry route that still crosses Southampton Water from a pier adjacent to the company's head office. From 1889 the Percy family were involved in the running of the ferry, and from 1900 to 1980 the service was run by the General Estates Company. Many of the ferries used carried the name Hotspur as a consequence of the family connection. Between 1932 and 1946 the company also operated the Dartmouth Lower Ferry in Devon.
