= Bathampton =

Village in Somerset, England

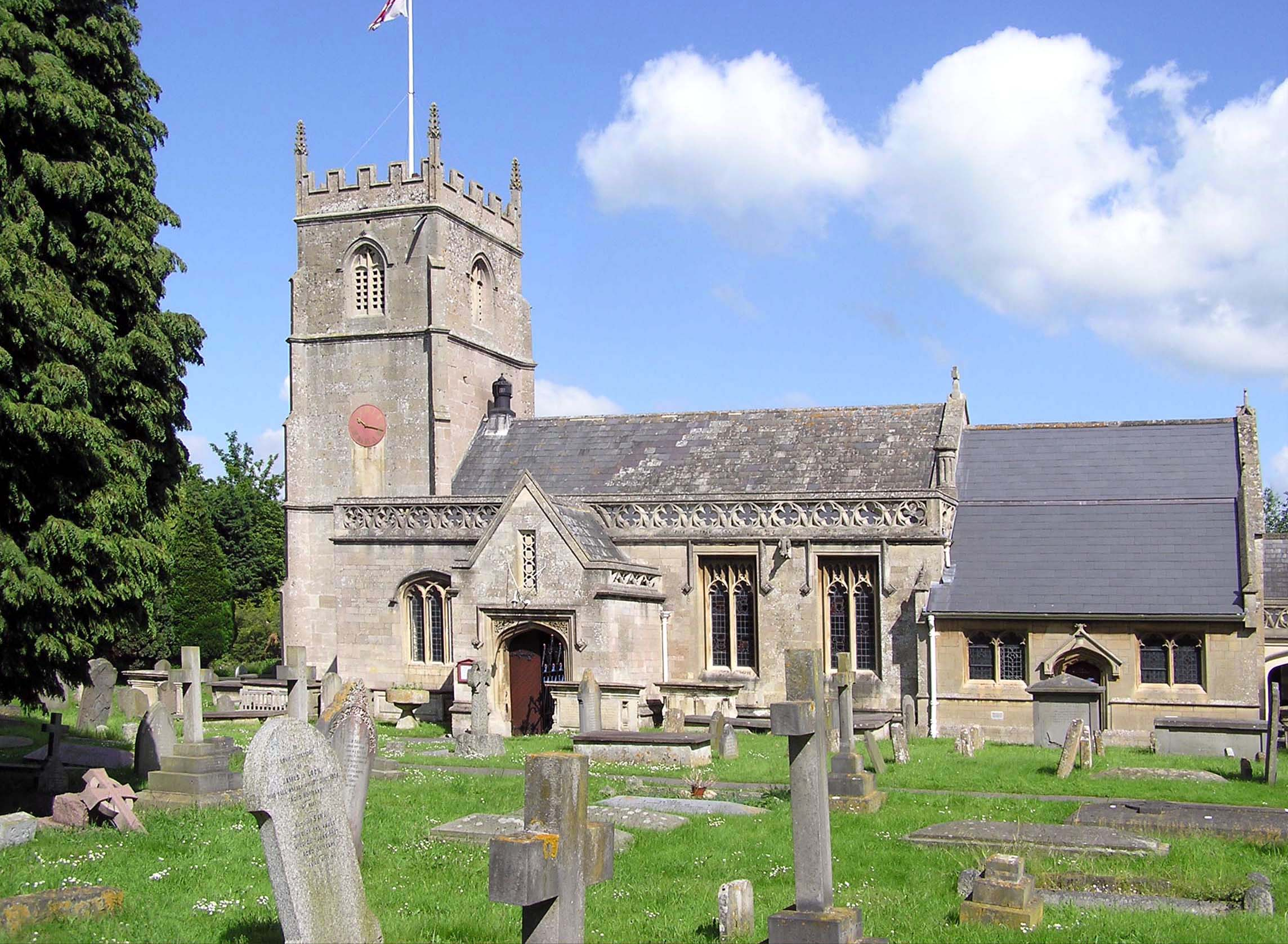
- St Nicholas' Church

- Location within Somerset
- Population: 1,603
- OS grid reference: ST777662
- Unitary authority: Bath and North East Somerset
- Ceremonial county: Somerset
- Region: South West
- Country: England
- Sovereign state: United Kingdom
- Post town: BATH
- Postcode district: BA2
- Dialling code: 01225
- Police: Avon and Somerset
- Fire: Avon
- Ambulance: South Western
- UK Parliament: Bath

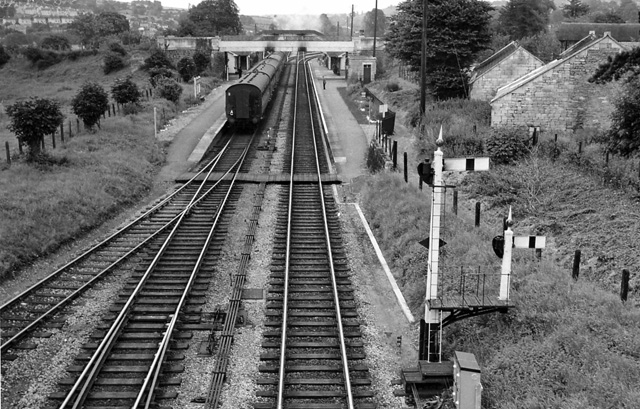
The former railway station in 1963

Bathampton (/bɑːθˈæmptən, bæθ-/) is a village and civil parish 2 miles (3 km) east of Bath, England on the south bank of the River Avon. The parish has a population of 1,603.

The Kennet and Avon Canal passes through the village and a toll bridge links Bathampton to Batheaston on the north bank of the canal.

== History ==
Bathampton Camp is a univallate Iron Age hill fort situated approximately 2 miles (3.2 km) east from the village. The site was excavated in 1904–05 and in 1952–54. Results found human and animal remains, pottery and flint flakes.

The parish was part of the hundred of Hampton.

The village used to be served by Bathampton railway station, but it was closed following the destructive Beeching cuts.

Plasticine was manufactured in the village between 1900 and 1983 by a company founded by William Harbutt, who also lived in Bathampton.

== Governance ==
The parish council has responsibility for some local issues, including setting an annual precept (local rate) to cover the council's operating costs and producing annual accounts for public scrutiny. The parish council evaluates local planning applications and works with the local police, district council officers, and neighbourhood watch groups on matters of crime, security, and traffic. The parish council's role also includes initiating projects for the maintenance and repair of parish facilities, such as the village hall or community centre, playing fields and playgrounds, as well as consulting with the district council on the maintenance, repair, and improvement of highways, drainage, footpaths, public transport, and street cleaning. Conservation matters (including trees and listed buildings) and environmental issues are also of interest to the council.

The parish falls within the unitary authority of Bath and North East Somerset which was created in 1996, as established by the Local Government Act 1992. It provides a single tier of local government with responsibility for almost all local government functions within its area including local planning and building control, local roads, council housing, environmental health, markets and fairs, refuse collection, recycling, cemeteries, crematoria, leisure services, parks, and tourism. It is also responsible for education, social services, libraries, main roads, public transport, trading standards, waste disposal and strategic planning, although fire, police and ambulance services are provided jointly with other authorities through the Avon Fire and Rescue Service, Avon and Somerset Constabulary and the South Western Ambulance Service.

Bath and North East Somerset's area covers part of the ceremonial county of Somerset but it is administered independently of the non-metropolitan county. Its administrative headquarters are in Bath. Between 1 April 1974 and 1 April 1996 it was the Wansdyke District and the City of Bath of the county of Avon. Before 1974 that the parish was part of the Bathavon Rural District.

The parish is part of 'Bathavon North' electoral ward. As well as covering Bathampton, Bathford and Batheaston this ward stretches east to Kelston. The total population of this ward as at the 2011 census was 7,147.

The parish is represented in the House of Commons of the Parliament of the United Kingdom as part of the Bath constituency. It elects one Member of Parliament (MP) by the first past the post system of election. It was also part of the South West England constituency of the European Parliament prior to Britain leaving the European Union in January 2020, which elected seven MEPs using the d'Hondt method of party-list proportional representation.

== Geography ==
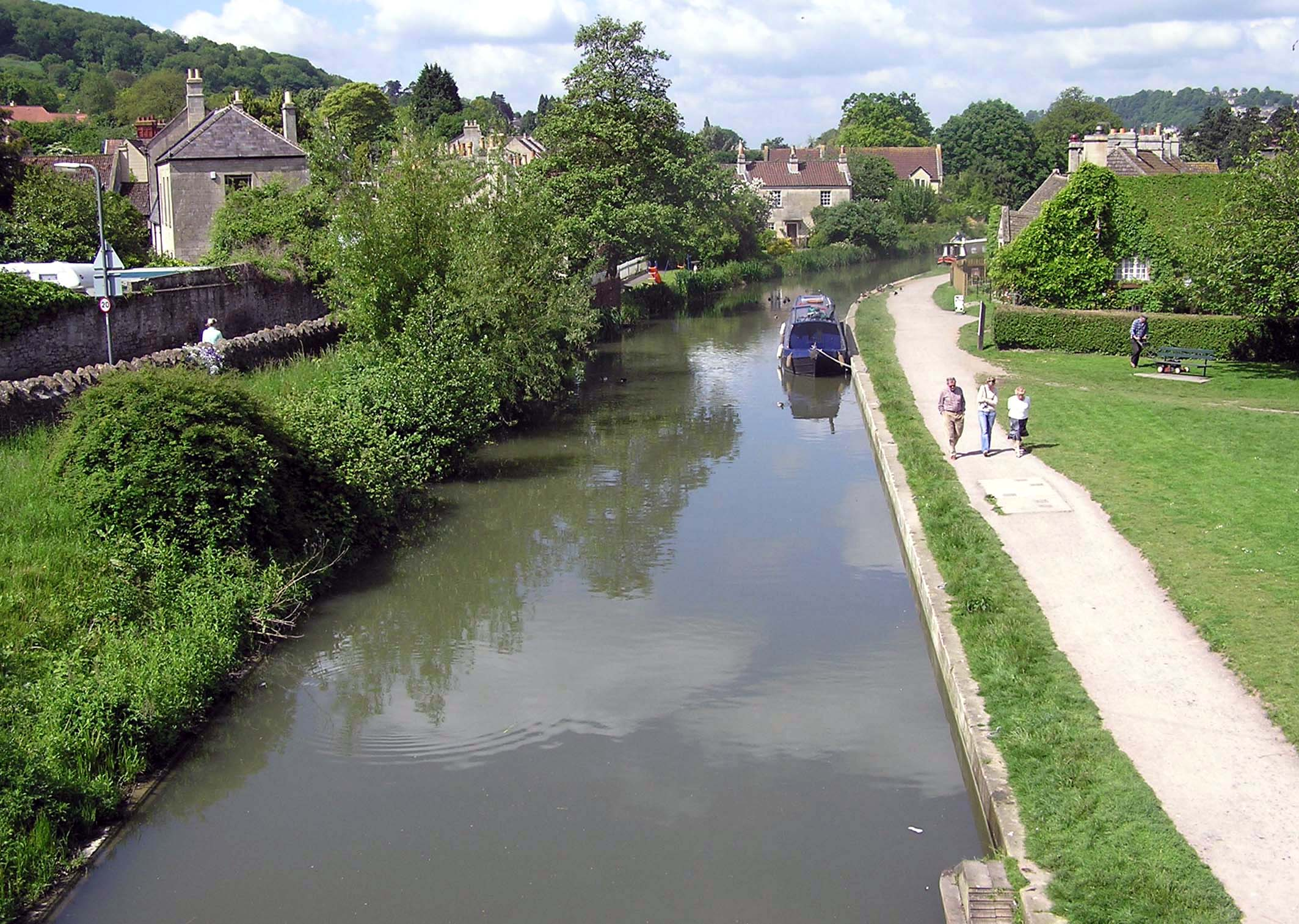
The Kennet and Avon Canal passes around the edge of the village

=== Bathampton Rocks ===
Above Bathampton is a steep slope, heavily quarried for stone near the top in the area now called Bathampton Rocks, leading to Bathampton Down. Until the late 1950s the track used for bringing stone down into the valley could be seen; it crossed the main A36 road over a short rock bridge known as the Dry Arch. This was demolished in 1958 as it was too low for double-decker buses and other traffic. Bathampton Rocks was the site of the Bathampton Patrol (Auxiliary Units) Operational Base during the Second World War. at OS Grid Ref ST778651 (51°23.0′N 2°19.1′W)

=== Bathampton Meadows ===
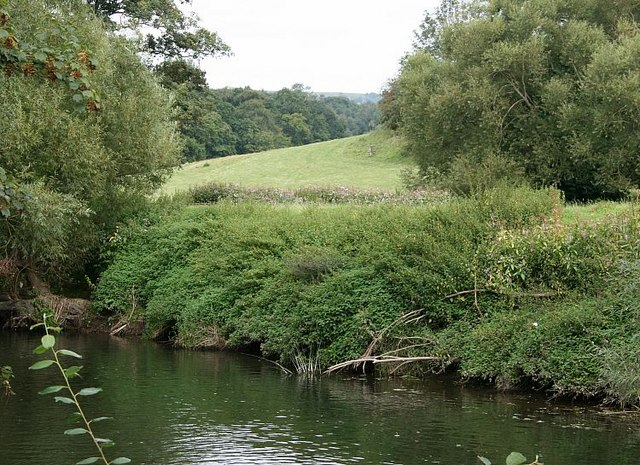
River Avon and meadows between Claverton and Bathampton, with Banner Down in the distance.

When the A46 Bathampton by-pass was built, an area of 9 hectares was created to provide additional flood relief. The wet meadows and the oxbow lake which were made have proved attractive to a number of migrant birds with waders such as dunlin, ringed and little ringed plover, and green and common sandpiper in spring and autumn. Sand martin and kingfisher have been seen regularly by the oxbow, and other migrants have included yellow wagtail, whinchat and hobby.

In 2009, the local Council identified the meadows as a possible new park and ride site to alleviate traffic congestion in the city. In January 2017 the council confirmed that the Bathampton Meadows site as it preferred option for a park and ride site to the east of the city, However the owner, Steve Horler, says that he is unwilling to sell the land. Immediate plans were abandoned in 2017, following public opposition.

In January 2022, the National Trust announced the purchase of 40 acres (16 ha) of Bathampton Meadows, the bulk of the meadow. A three-mile walking route was developed through the meadow, opened in September 2024.

== Landmarks ==
Above the village is Sham Castle, a folly built in 1762 by Richard James, master mason for Ralph Allen, "to improve the prospect" from Allen's town house in Bath. It is a screen wall with a central pointed arch flanked by two 3-storey circular turrets, which extend sideways to a 2-storey square tower at each end of the wall. It is illuminated at night.

== Church ==
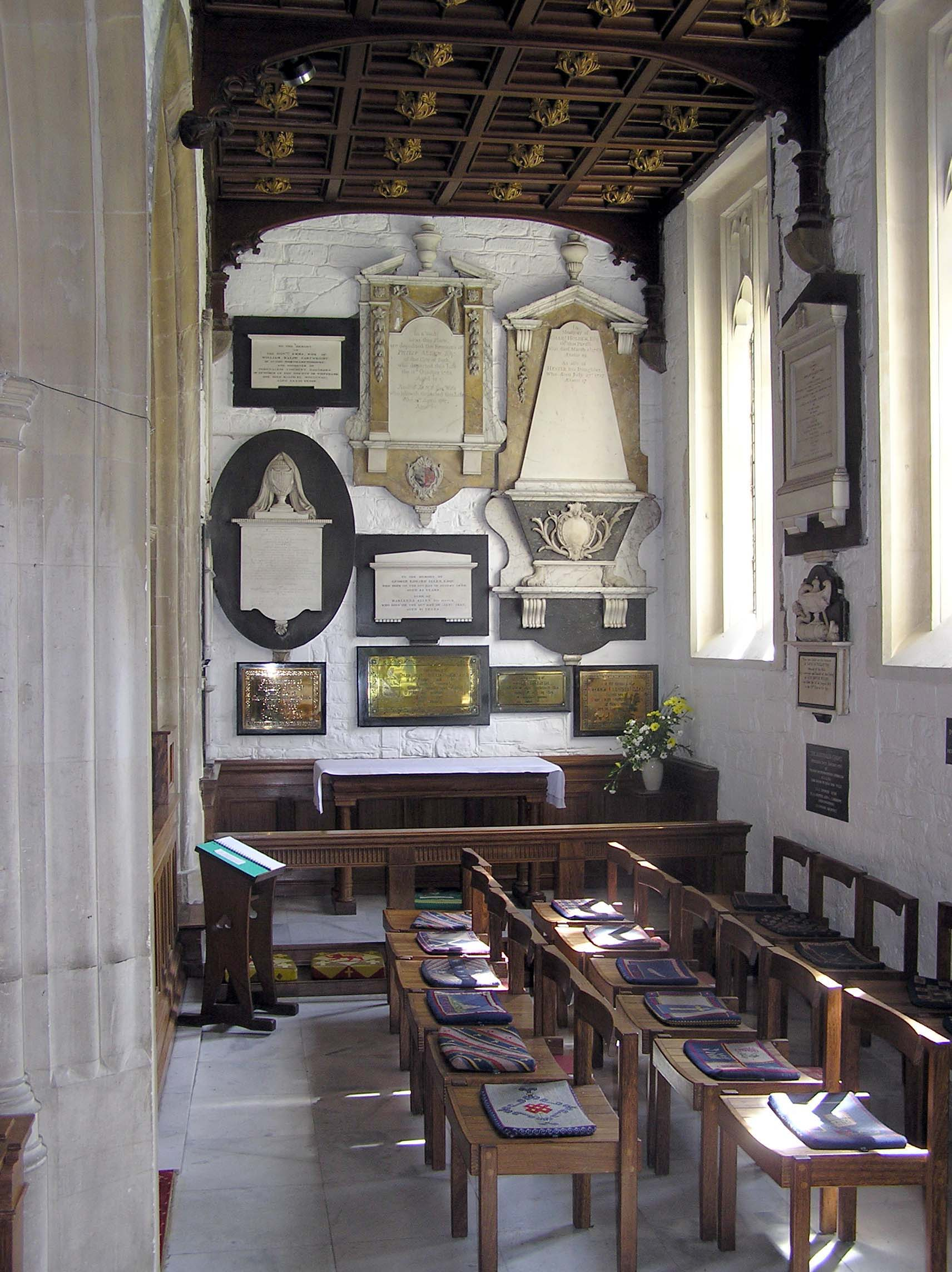
The Australia Chapel in St Nicholas Church

In the 13th century John Stafford, who later became the Archbishop of Canterbury, was the vicar of Bathampton.

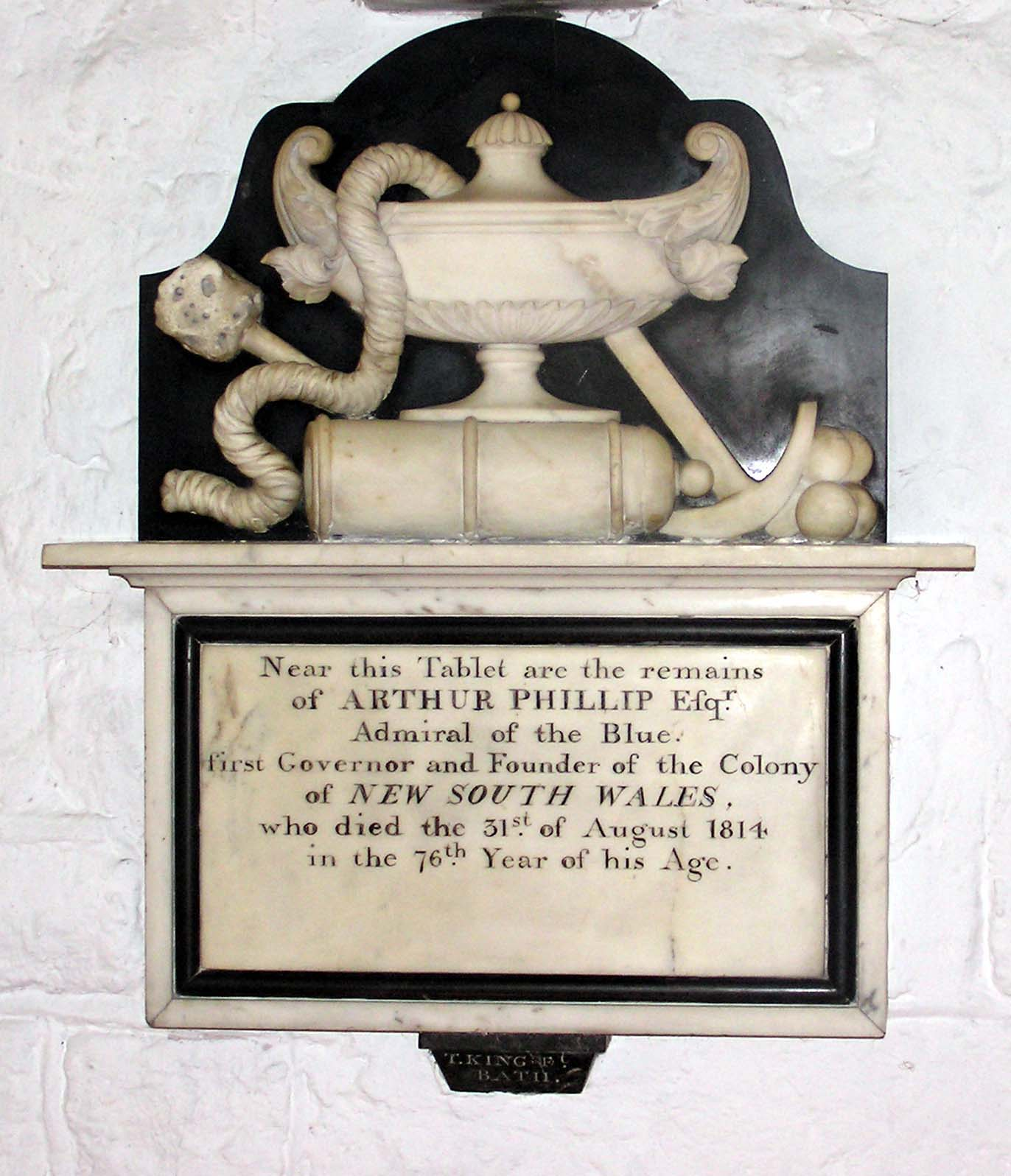
Memorial in St Nicholas Church to Arthur Phillip, first Governor of New South Wales, Australia

The Parish Church of St Nicholas has 13th-century origins with 15th-century alterations and tower. In the mid-18th century Ralph Allen added Gothic components after he acquired Bathampton Manor by marriage in 1731. The building was further restored and the north aisle built in 1858 by Henry Goodridge and the chancel was restored in 1882 by Charles Edward Davis. The "Australia Chapel" in the south aisle contains memorials to the Allen family and to Admiral Arthur Phillip, the first Governor of New South Wales. Phillip was buried in the church after his death in 1814 and although it was unnoticed for many years, the grave was discovered in 1897 and the Premier of New South Wales, Sir Henry Parkes, had it restored. The windows of the sanctuary carry the coat of arms of the Federal Government and the six Australian States.

Buried in the church yard is the body of the French aristocrat, Adolphe, Vicomte du Barry, a nephew-by-marriage and close personal friend of Madame du Barry, Louis XV's legendarily beautiful mistress. The Vicomte had been living in nearby Bath when he was killed in a duel with an Irish adventurer, Captain Rice.
