= Whitchurch Bridge =

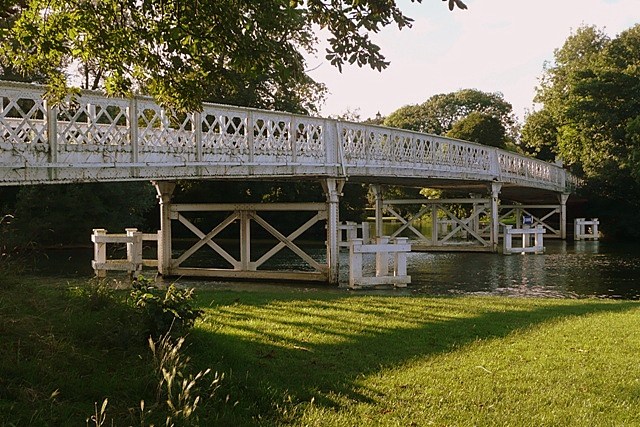
- Whitchurch Bridge as seen from Pangbourne Meadow
- Coordinates: 51°29′12.5″N 1°05′06.5″W
- Carries: B471 road & Thames Path
- Crosses: River Thames
- Locale: Pangbourne, West Berkshire / Whitchurch-on-Thames, South Oxfordshire
- Maintained by: Company of Proprietors of Whitchurch Bridge (The)
- Heritage status: Grade II listed

Characteristics
- Design: Atkins, largely to earlier designs
- Total length: 82.1 metres (269 ft)
- Width: 5.18 metres (17.0 ft) plus 1.3-metre footway (pavement)
- Height: 13 feet 7 inches (4.14 m)
- No. of spans: 4
- Clearance above: limited by rail bridge to south at: 11 feet 7 inches (3.53 m)
- Clearance below: 12 feet 7 inches (3.84 m) (at normal high, winter levels)

History
- Opened: November 1792, rebuilt to new design opened early 1853, ditto early 1902, re-laid version opened 19 September 2014
- Closed: for a few months before re-opening dates listed above

Statistics
- Toll: Free for Motorcycles; £0.60 Cars and Vans; £4.00 Vehicles of over 3.5 tonnes

Location
- Interactive map of Whitchurch Bridge

Whitchurch Bridge is a toll bridge that carries the B471 road over the River Thames in England. It links the villages of Pangbourne in Berkshire, and Whitchurch-on-Thames in Oxfordshire – crossing the river just downstream of Whitchurch Lock. It is one of two remaining private toll bridges across the Thames, the other being Swinford Toll Bridge. The bridge has a weight limit of 7.5 tonnes (Note: As does the village to the north) and is a Grade II listed structure. (Note: The mainstream, lowest category of listed structure/building.) Its 1792-built, now unrelated, residential toll house is also listed.

The bridge is owned and maintained by The Company of Proprietors of Whitchurch Bridge, who are themselves owned by the General Estates Company, who also own Bathampton Toll Bridge across the River Avon to the east of Bath. Tolls currently range from 60p for cars to £4 for vehicles of over 3.5 tonnes. Pedestrians, cyclists and motorcycles cross for free. A pre-paid multiple-use Bridge Card can be bought that provides cost savings on tolls.

The Thames Path crosses the river on Whitchurch Bridge. In the downstream (easterly) direction the path passes along the southern bank of the Thames through Pangbourne Meadow. In the upstream (westerly) direction it takes a more inland route through Hartslock on the north side of the river.

== History ==
A bridge has stood here since 1792 when it replaced a ferry. The structure was renewed in 1852–3, 1902 and most recently in 2014. The original charges ranged from a halfpenny (1/480 of a pound) per pedestrian, sheep, lamb, boar, sow or pig to twopence for each wheel of a vehicle and twopence for the drawing animal (though one and a half if an ass), so a 1/24 of a pound for a horse-drawn four-wheeled vehicle (equivalent to £5 in 2025). Horses and persons using the lock for barge hauling were exempt.

Whitchurch Bridge Act 1792
- Act of Parliament
- Parliament of Great Britain
- Long title: An Act for building a Bridge, at or near the Ferry over the River Thames, from Whitchurch in the County of Oxford, to the opposite Shore in the Parish of Pangbourn, in the County of Berks.
- Citation: 32 Geo. 3. c. 97
- Territorial extent: Great Britain

Dates
- Royal assent: 11 June 1792
- Commencement: 31 January 1792 (Note: Start of session.)
Other legislation
Amended by	Whitchurch Bridge Act 1988

Status: Amended

Text of statute as originally enacted

Whitchurch Bridge Act 1988 (Note: Section 1(1).)
- Act of Parliament
- Parliament of the United Kingdom
- Long title: An Act to modify the Transport Charges &c. (Miscellaneous Provisions) Act 1954 in its application to the bridge undertaking of the Company of Proprietors of Whitchurch Bridge; to confer other powers on the proprietors and to amend or repeal certain of the local statutory provisions applicable to them; and for other purposes.
- Citation: 1988 c. vi
- Territorial extent: United Kingdom

Dates
- Royal assent: 15 March 1988
- Commencement: 15 March 1988 (Note: The Acts of Parliament (Commencement) Act 1793.)
Other legislation
Amends	Whitchurch Bridge Act 1792; Transport Charges &c. (Miscellaneous Provisions) Act 1954

Status: Current legislation

Text of statute as originally enacted

The Company of Proprietors of Whitchurch Bridge was promoted by a consortium of ten subscribers, and was authorised by the Whitchurch Bridge Act 1792 (32 Geo. 3. c. 97). Under this act, and the Whitchurch Bridge Act 1988 (c. vi), it has a duty to maintain the bridge "forever in good and sufficient repair" and to replace it if it becomes unsafe. In November 2008 the owners' predicted a renewal was vital within a decade and so announced application to the Department for Transport to double the toll for cars to 40p. This met with more local opposition than registered support. A public inquiry was held in June 2009 and the toll increase was approved in October 2009; the new toll came into force on 26 October 2009.

From October 2013 a complete reconstruction took place, with new and stronger piling and steel spans. The white lattice iron girders of the 1902 structure were refurbished and incorporated in the design. The contractor was Balfour Beatty, the designer Atkins and the project manager Oxfordshire County Council. During reconstruction the bridge was closed to vehicles, but a temporary footbridge was provided. The project was delayed for several months by exceptional flood flows in the Thames and the new bridge was finally opened on 19 September 2014. A blessing ceremony was conducted five days later by the Bishop of Oxford, during which a 1902 De Dion-Bouton was driven across the bridge, carrying Bridge Company directors and a descendant of one of the original bridge promoters of 1792.

Whitchurch Bridge (Revision of Tolls) Order 2015 (Note: Section 1.)
- Statutory Instrument
- Parliament of the United Kingdom
- Citation: SI 2015/1573
- Territorial extent: United Kingdom

Dates
- Made: 23 July 2015
- Commencement: 30 July 2015
Other legislation
Repeals/revokes	Whitchurch Bridge (Revision of Tolls) Order 2009
Made under	Transport Charges &c. (Miscellaneous Provisions) Act 1954

Status: Current legislation

Text of statute as originally enacted

As a result of the delays and consequent overspend on the reconstruction, the company proposed a further toll increase and a public enquiry was held on 19 May 2015. It considered 293 written objections but approved the request to increase tolls to 60p for cars and £4 for vehicles weighing more than 3.5 tonnes, which was applied by the Whitchurch Bridge (Revision of Tolls) Order 2015 (SI 2015/1573) on 12 August. In 2019 it was announced that the Company of Proprietors of Whitchurch Bridge had been sold to the General Estates Company, who previously held a minority stake in the company since the late 1920s.

== Gallery ==
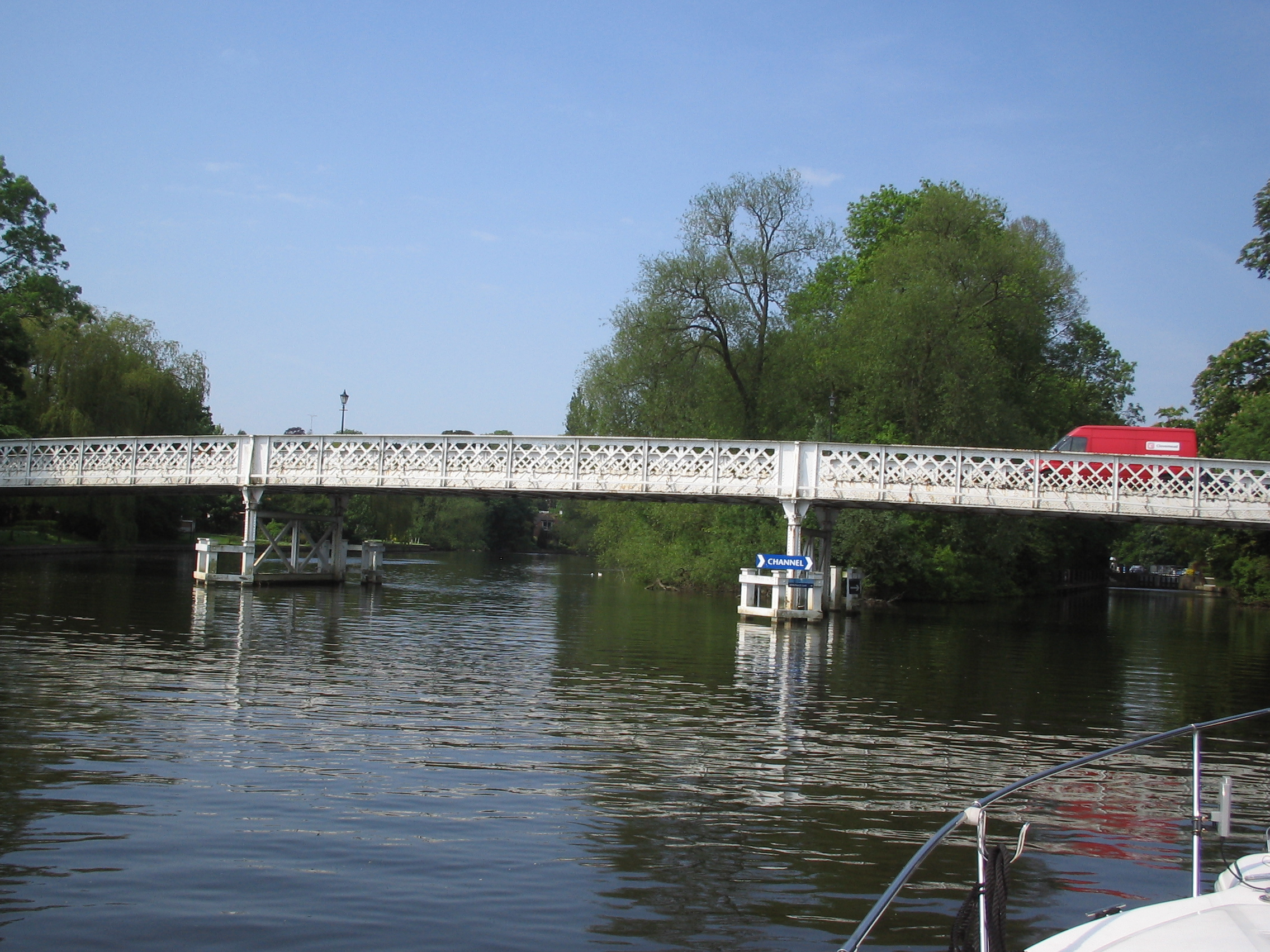
The bridge from the river, looking upstream

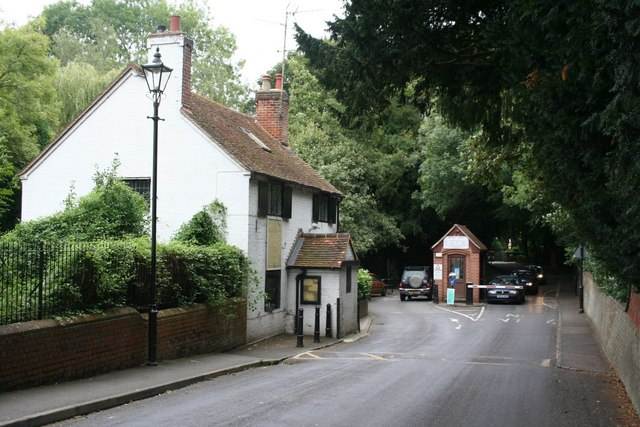
Old and new toll houses seen from the bridge

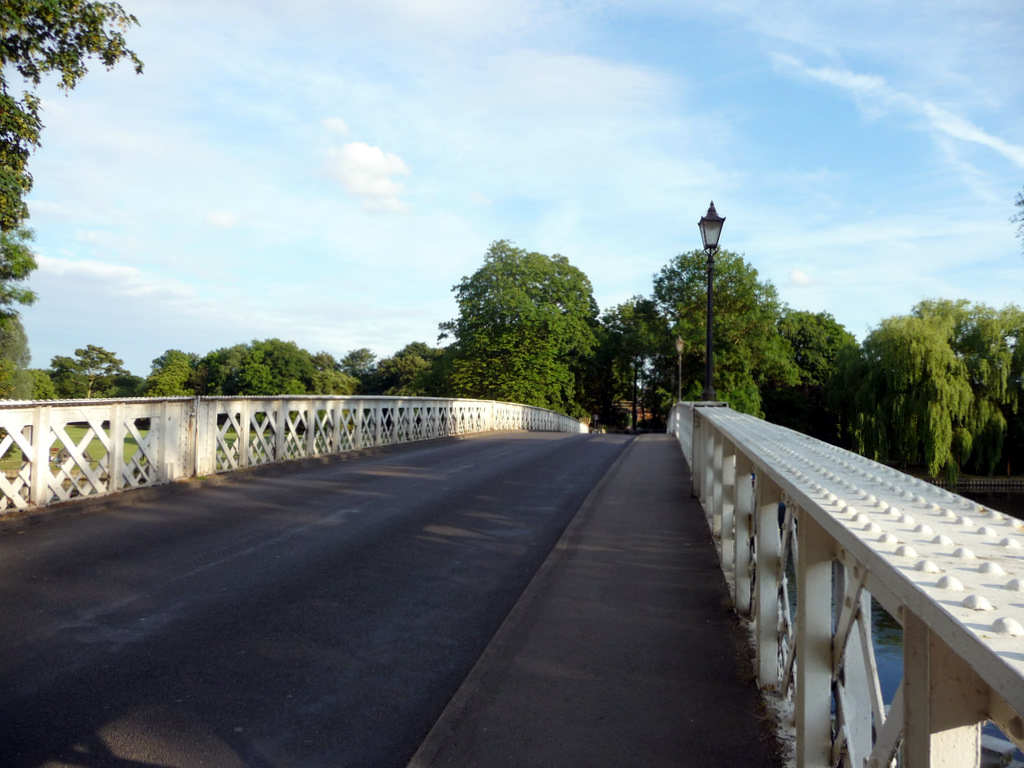
The bridge looking towards Berkshire

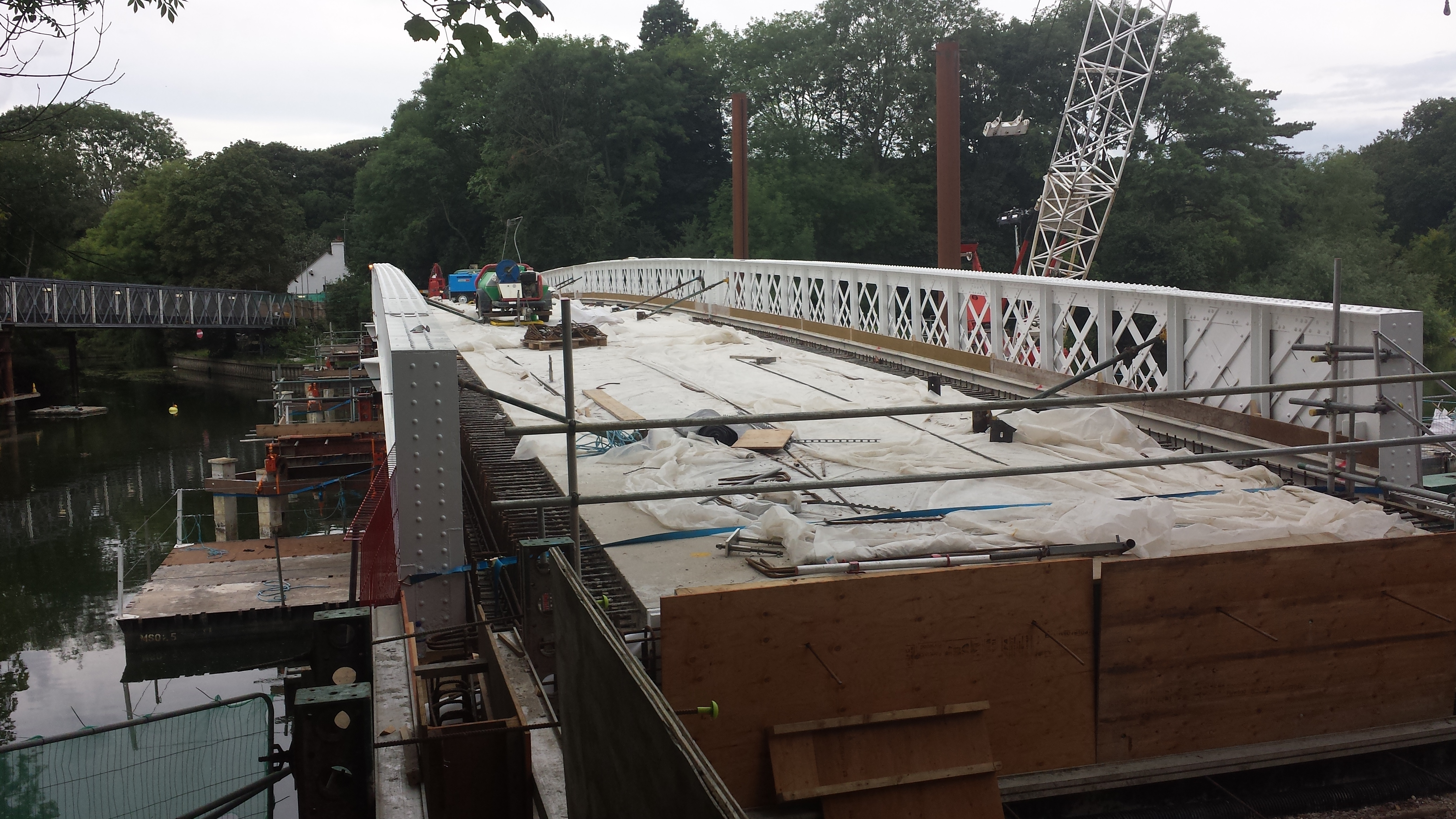
The bridge under reconstruction in 2014

== See also ==
- Crossings of the River Thames

== Notes ==
Next bridge upstream	River Thames	Next bridge downstream
Gatehampton Railway Bridge (railway)	Whitchurch Bridge; Grid reference SU636768	Reading Festival Bridge (intermittently present); Caversham Bridge (road)
Next bridge upstream	Thames Path	Next bridge downstream
northern bank Goring and Streatley Bridge	Whitchurch Bridge; Grid reference SU6361676833	southern bank Sonning Bridge
