= Henry Skrine =

English traveller and author

Henry Skrine (1755–1803) was an English traveller and author.

== Life ==
He was the son of Richard Dickson Skrine of Warleigh Manor, Bathford, Somerset, and his wife Elizabeth, daughter of John Tryon of Collyweston, Northamptonshire. He entered Christ Church, Oxford, on 24 January 1774, and graduated B.C.L. in 1781. Becoming a member of Lincoln's Inn, he was called to the bar in 1782. He may not have had a practice as a barrister.

Skrine spent much of his time travelling through Great Britain, and recording his experiences. In 1793 he visited the north of Scotland, then little known. He died at Walton-on-Thames in 1803.

== Works ==
Skrine wrote:

- Three Tours in the North of England and in Scotland, London, 1795.
- Two Tours through Wales, London, 1798; 2nd edit. 1812.
- Rivers of note in Great Britain, London, 1801.

== Family ==
Skrine twice married. With his first wife, Marianne, eldest daughter of John Chalié of Wimbledon, Surrey, he had one son, Henry. His second wife was Letitia Harcourt of Dany-Park, near Crickhowell in Brecon. His children were:

- Henry (c.1788–1853), married in 1812 Caroline Anne Spry, daughter of the Rev. Benjamin Spry, and had five sons and four daughters. He built the current Warleigh Manor, c.1815.
- John Harcourt, a cleric, married in 1815 Eleanor Baldwin.
- Thomas Henry, youngest son, died unmarried 1815 at Mathura aged 23, ensign in the 5th Bombay Native Infantry.
- Isabella, Henrietta, and Catherine; with Letitia and Anne, who died young. Henrietta (died 1832) married the Rev. Edward Butler.
