= Claverton Pumping Station =

Pumping station in Somerset, England

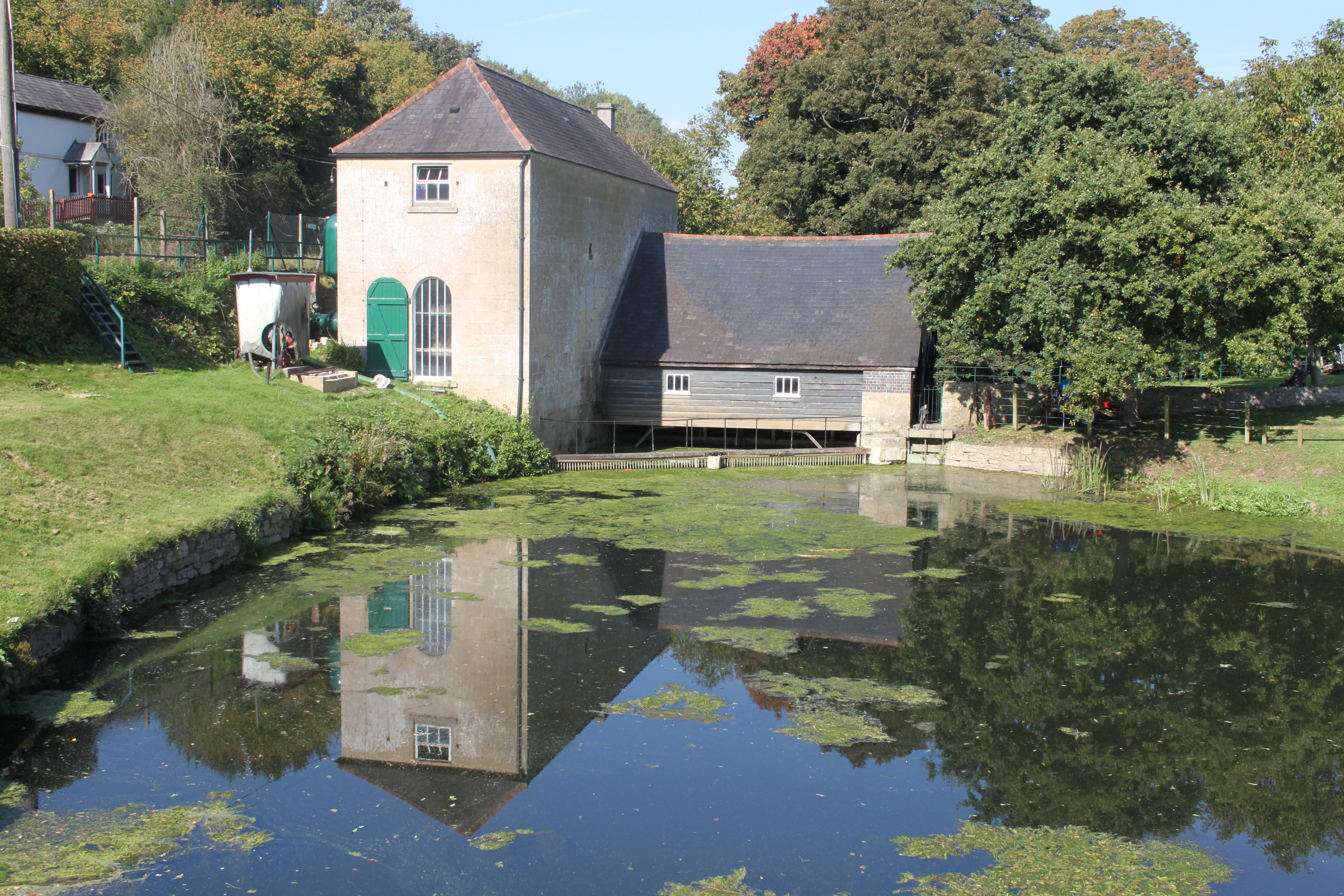
- Claverton Pumping Station with the pump house on the left, the wheelhouse to the right and the millpond in the foreground

- Location within Somerset
- 51°22′41″N 2°18′06″W
- Type: Pumping station
- Location: Claverton, Somerset, England

History
- Built: 1813

Site notes
- Architect: John Rennie
- Governing body: Claverton Pumping Station Group
- Owner: Canal and River Trust

Listed Building – Grade I
- Official name: Claverton Pumping Station
- Designated: 3 April 2019
- Reference no.: 1214608

Listed Building – Grade II
- Official name: Claverton Pumping Station
- Designated: 14 August 1984
- Reference no.: 399483

Claverton Pumping Station in the village of Claverton, in the English county of Somerset, pumps water from the River Avon to the Kennet and Avon Canal using power from the flow of the river. It is a Grade I listed building, having been upgraded from Grade II in 2019.

The pumping station was built by John Rennie between 1809 and 1813 to overcome water supply problems on the canal. It uses a 24-foot (7 m) wide wooden breastshot water wheel to drive two Boulton and Watt 18-foot (5 m) long cast iron rocking beams, which power lift pumps to raise water 48 feet (15 m) up to the canal. The pumping station has undergone several modifications since its initial construction, including revising the wheel into two sections each 12 feet (3.7 m) wide separated by a 9-inch (23 cm) gap. The station's operational life ended in 1952, by which time its maintenance and repair had become uneconomical in the light of falling traffic on the canal.

In the 1960s and 1970s restoration was carried out by students from the University of Bath and the Kennet and Avon Canal Trust, who replaced and repaired the buildings and equipment and returned the pumping station to a functional state by 1978. It is now owned by the Canal and River Trust and maintained by the Claverton Pumping Station Trust CIO, open to the public as an industrial heritage museum.

== Description ==
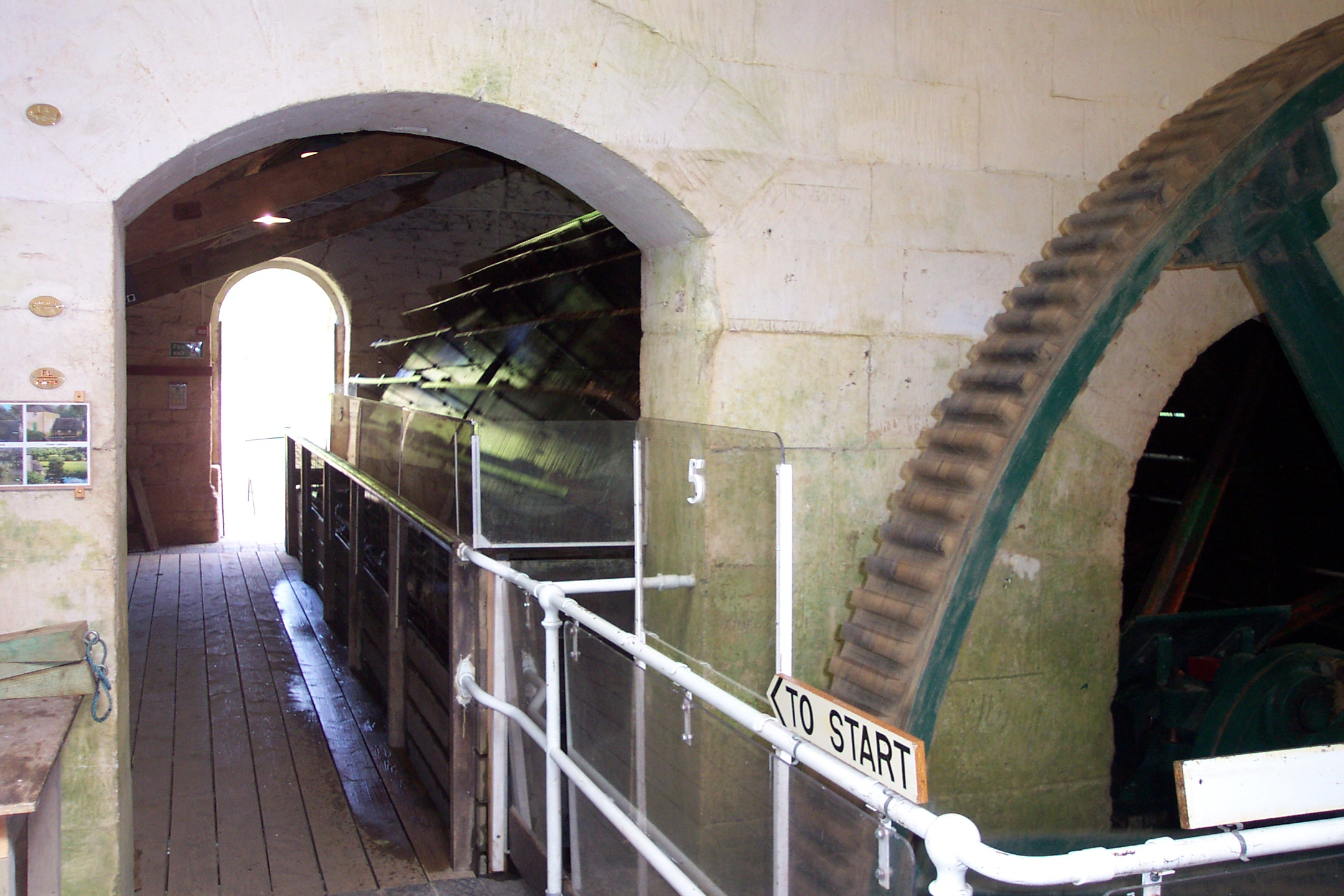
The interior, showing waterwheel and gearing

At Claverton, the Kennet and Avon Canal is cut into the side of the Avon valley 48 feet (15 m) above the River Avon. The pumping station is in a pump house built of Bath Stone, which is at river level and separated from the canal by the Wessex Main Line. It was designed by John Rennie and built by Fox of Bristol. The pump house has a slate hipped roof. The wheelhouse projects to the west of the pump house and has weatherboard sides. The east gable wall has three doors allowing access to the wheel itself.

Water is diverted from the river by Warleigh Weir, about 200 yards (183 m) upstream. The water flows to the pumping station down a 30-foot (9.1 m) wide leat, which is crossed by a single segmental arch bridge with a central keystone. The water passes over depressing sluices which can be raised or lowered by hand cranking, and then powers a breastshot water wheel. The 24-foot (7 m) wide wheel is in two sections, each 12 feet (3.7 m) wide and 17 feet (5 m) in diameter, with a 9-inch (23 cm) gap between them. The wheel has 48 wooden starts on each of the six cast iron rims. These starts support 96 float boards each of which is 13 inches (33 cm) by 1 inch (2.5 cm) by 12 feet (3.7 m), and is paired with a 11 inches (28 cm) seal board bolted directly to the rim. The original timber selection for the wheel is not known, but since 1983 the starts have been made from Iroko due to its longevity even in conditions where it is cycled between submerged and dry due to intermittent running. The breastshot wheel is vertically mounted, and falling water strikes the blades. Breastshot wheels are less efficient than backshot or overshot wheels, but more efficient than undershot wheels.

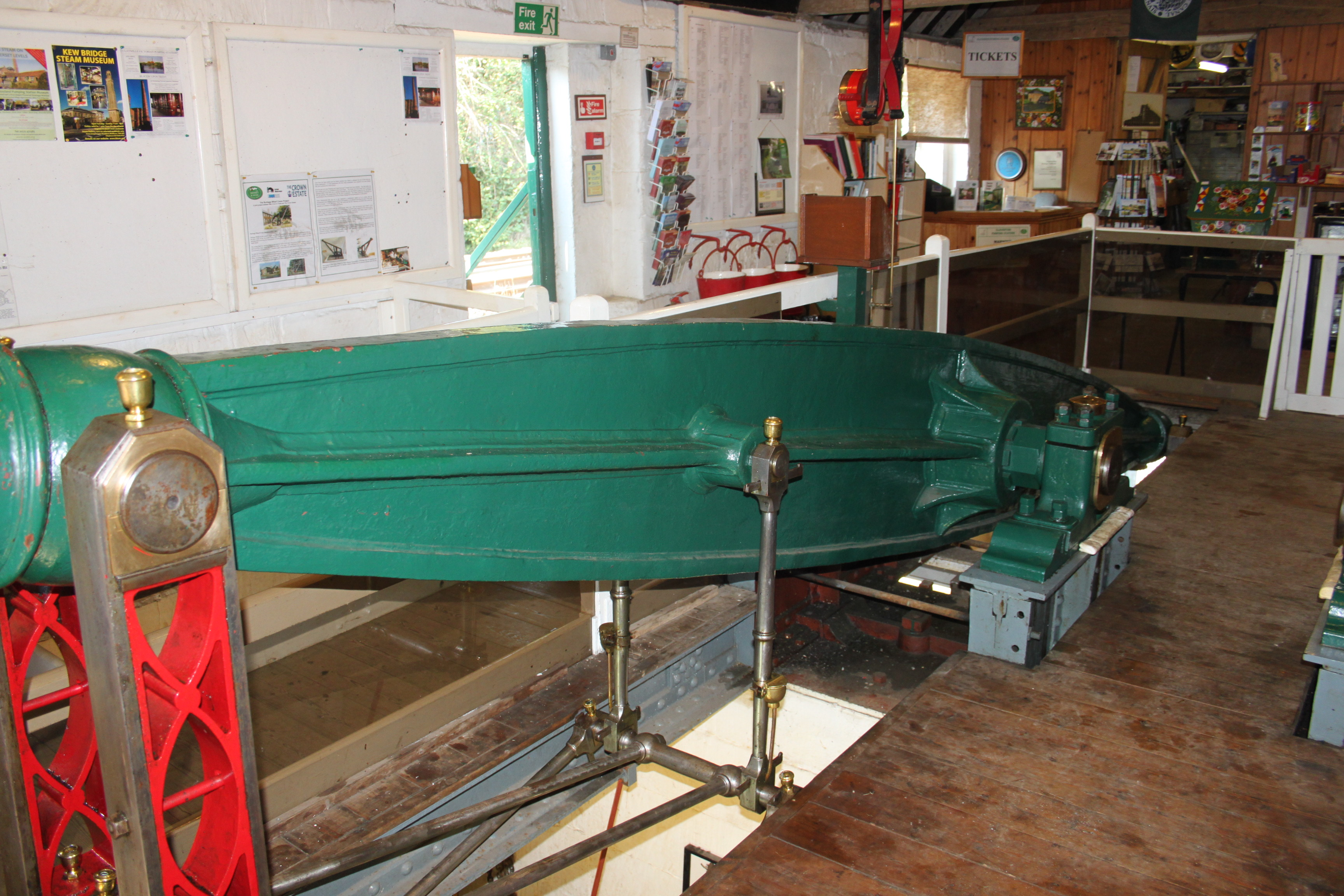
One of the rocking beams by Boulton and Watt

At full power the wheel uses 2 tons (2 tonnes) of water per second and rotates five times a minute. The water wheel drives a flexible coupling to a pit wheel with a diameter of 16 feet 3 inches (4.95 m), which has 408 (204 pairs) hand-fitted wooden teeth that mesh with a 5 feet 1 inch (1.55 m) cast iron gear, increasing the speed to 16 rpm. From there, cranks drive vertical connecting rods that transfer the energy to two 18-foot (5 m) long cast iron rocking beams made by Boulton and Watt. Each beam drives an 18-inch (0.46 m) diameter lift pump, which also takes its supply from the mill leat. Each pump stroke raises 50 imperial gallons (230 litres) of water to the canal via 150 feet (46 m) of 19-inch (0.48 m) diameter cast iron pipe. With the sluice fully depressed the flow is 73 ft^{3}/s and due to the build-up of spent water in the tail-race the working head is reduced to 4 feet 6 inches (1.37 m), giving a potential power of 34 3/4 hp. The output power, calculated from the water lifted into the canal per minute, is 24 hp representing an efficiency of 62%.

== History ==
=== Construction ===
The idea of an east to west waterway link across southern England was first mentioned in Elizabethan times, between 1558 and 1603, to take advantage of the proximity of the rivers Avon and Thames, only 3 miles (4.8 km) apart at their closest. Plans for a waterway were shelved until the early 18th century. In 1723 the Kennet Navigation through Reading opened. The Avon navigation from Bristol to Bath was opened in 1727. In 1788 the so-called "Western Canal" was proposed to improve trade and communication links to towns such as Hungerford, Marlborough, Wiltshire, Calne, Chippenham and Melksham. The following year the engineers Barns, Simcock and Weston submitted a proposed route for this canal, although there were doubts about the adequacy of the water supply. The name was changed from Western Canal to Kennet and Avon Canal to avoid confusion with the Grand Western Canal, which was being proposed at the same time.

In 1793 a further survey was conducted by John Rennie, and the route of the canal was altered to take a more southerly course through Great Bedwyn, Devizes, Trowbridge and Newbury. The proposed route was accepted by the Kennet and Avon Canal Company. In July 1793 Rennie suggested further alterations to the route, including the construction of the Bruce Tunnel in the Savernake Forest. On 17 April 1794 the Kennet and Avon Canal Act 1794 (34 Geo. 3. c. 90) received royal assent and construction began.

The new route added several locks to the canal, making water supply problems more severe. Because of the way the system of locks works, water is lost from the upper part of a canal each time a vessel passes through. This is a particular issue for the pound between Bradford Lock at Bradford on Avon and the Bath Locks, where a series of locks need to be opened each time a vessel passes. Most lock gates are not watertight, therefore some water leaks from the higher levels of the canal to those lower down. The water has to be replaced, or eventually the upper levels of the canal would not hold enough water to be navigable. Canals are usually fed by diverting water from streams and rivers into their upper parts, but if no suitable source is available or sufficient, a pumping station, such as the one at Claverton, can be used to maintain the water level. Crofton Pumping Station, to the east near Great Bedwyn in Wiltshire, was built to supply water to the summit pound of the canal; it opened in 1810 but, unlike Claverton, was powered by steam.

Protracted negotiations over water rights with the owners of Saltford Brass Mill and around 30 other mills on the river between Bath and Bristol delayed construction until 1809; the wheel was installed in March 1810. Further delays relating to obtaining specific items of machinery meant that the pumping station did not open until early 1813, and until then boats were prohibited from using Bath Locks during periods of low rainfall.

=== Operation and decline ===
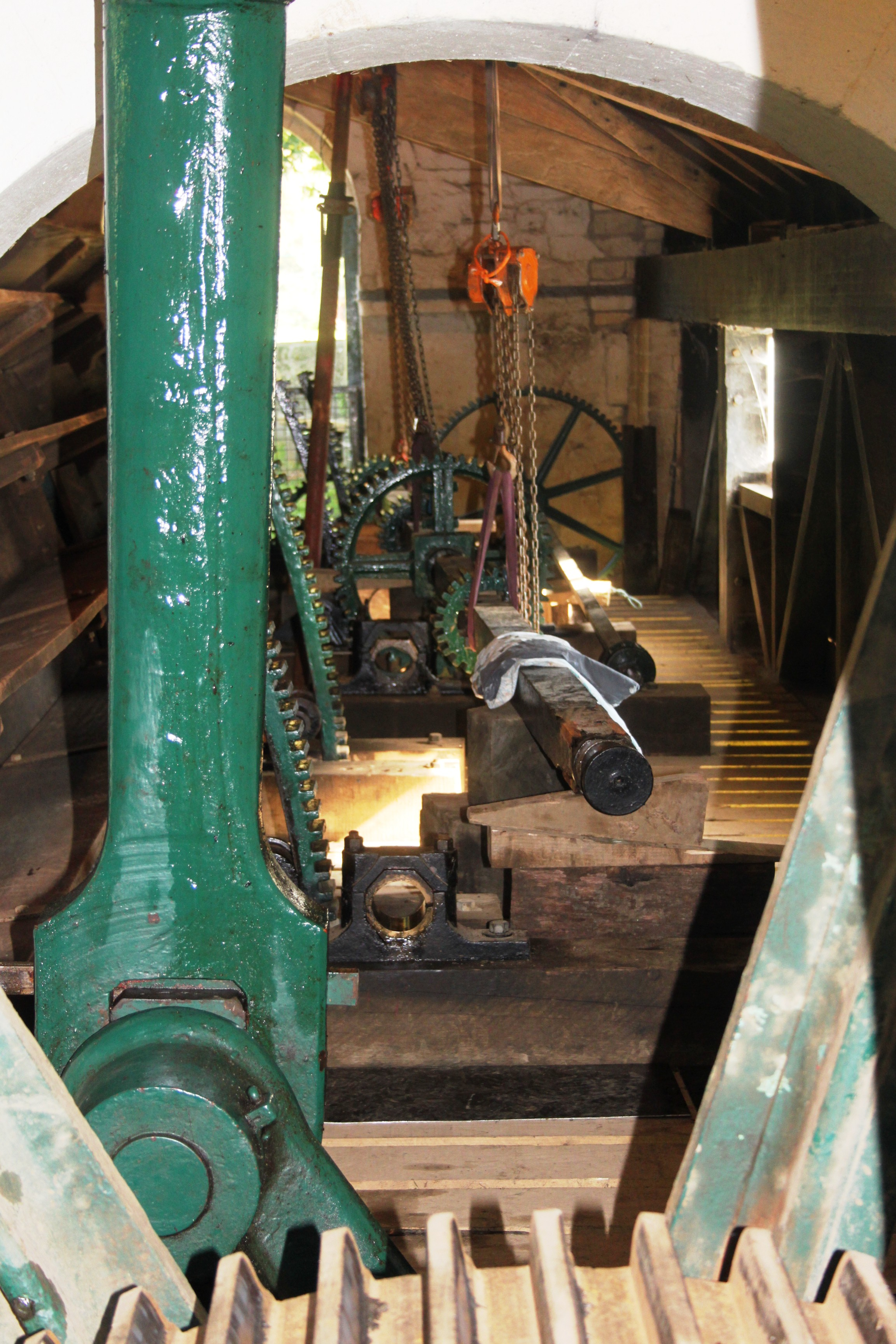
Gearing and the sluice cranks

The pumping station operated continuously, providing water for the increasing traffic on the canal. The width of the water wheel, which was supported at either end, meant that the middle of the wheel sagged, putting strain on the bearings and stays. In the 1840s the trussing was changed from stays to tension rods to strengthen and lighten the wheel, along with improvements to the pumps. The changes to the wheel were unsuccessful, and in the 1850s a central bearing was added, dividing the wheel in two.

The opening of the Great Western Railway in 1841 led to a significant decline in the canal's traffic, even though the canal company lowered tariffs. In 1852 the railway company took over the canal's operation. In 1877 the canal recorded a deficit of £1,920 and never subsequently made a profit. The Somerset Coal Canal and Wilts & Berks Canal, which each supplied some of the trade to the Kennet and Avon, including freight from the Somerset coalfield, closed in 1904 and 1906 respectively. At Claverton various minor repairs were needed to the wheel and pump, and the wheel had to be levelled at regular intervals during the later part of the 19th and early 20th centuries. The 408 "green oak" teeth on the pit wheel also had to be replaced several times.

In 1926, following a loss of £18,041 the previous year, the Great Western Railway sought to close the canal by obtaining a Ministry of Transport Order, but the move was resisted and the company charged with improving its maintenance of the canal. After the Second World War the Transport Act 1947 meant that control of the canal passed to the British Transport Commission, but by the 1950s large sections had been closed because of poor lock maintenance following a breach in the bank west of the Avoncliff Aqueduct. Claverton Pumping Station ceased operation in 1952, after the failure of a number of the pit wheel's oak teeth. The British Transport Commission installed a 6-inch (15 cm) centrifugal pump to maintain the statutory minimum water level.

=== Restoration ===
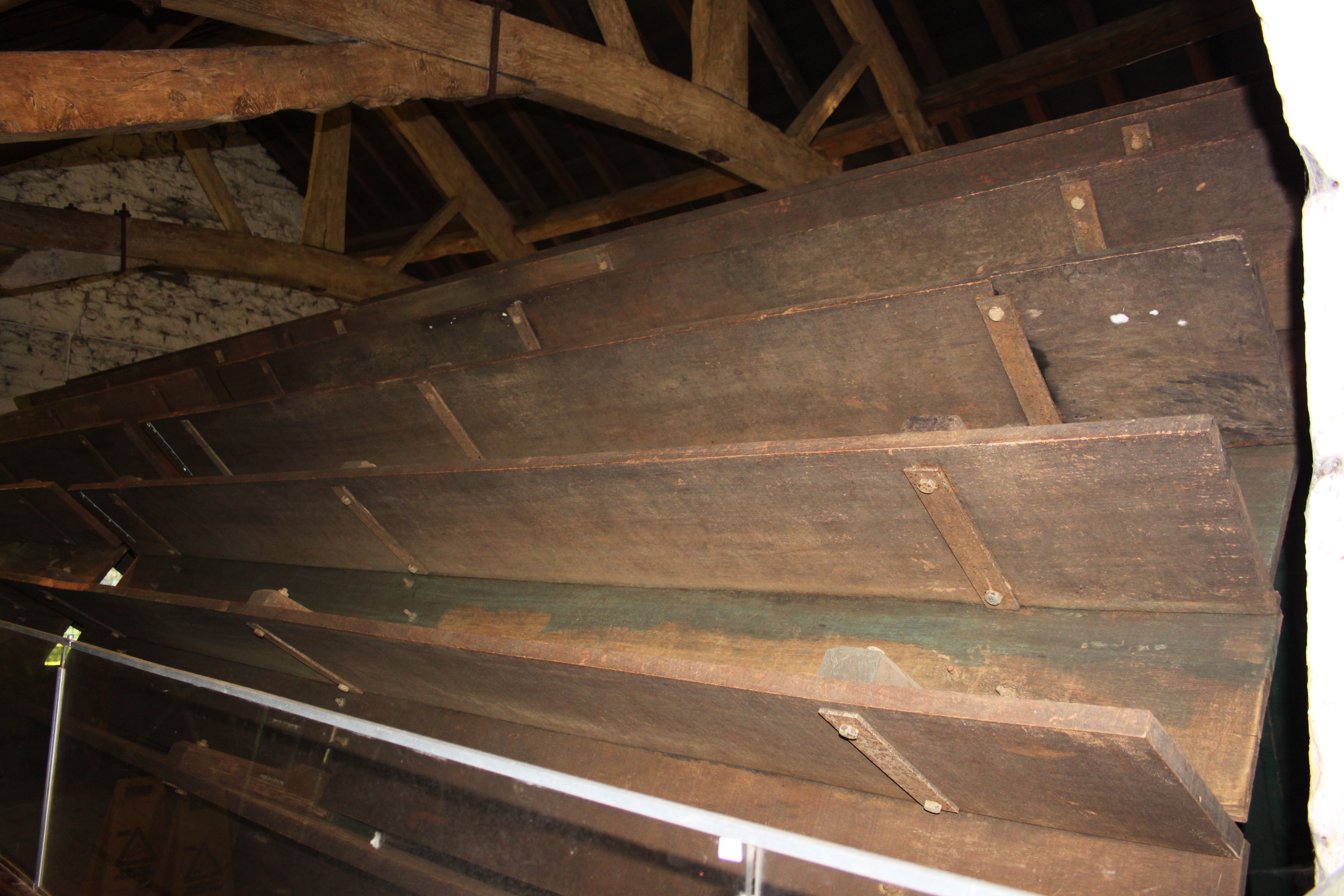
Close-up of the breastshot wheel

After its closure the pumping station lay derelict until the late 1960s, when the Kennet and Avon Canal Trust proposed to the British Waterways Board that students from the University of Bath conduct a survey and report on the viability of returning the pumping station to working order. Work started in 1969 with engineering students from Bath providing the labour under the supervision of John Butt, and the trust providing the funding. Within the building, rotten woodwork was replaced and electric lighting installed. To allow work on the sluices and the waterwheel the leat was dammed. Specialist wood and metal work was undertaken by apprentices from the British Aircraft Corporation at Filton. By 1972 some progress had been made; John Butt retired and Derrick Dudden took over as restoration manager, with more volunteers from the Canal Trust helping to provide the labour. Silt was removed from the pond, hatches replaced and the waterwheel restored. The 408 oak teeth on the pit wheel were replaced and the pumps overhauled with new rope packing. By February 1976 all the machinery was working and water could be pumped from the river to the canal. The pumping station was formally re-opened in 1978.

In 1981, British Waterways installed two 75-horsepower (56 kW) electric pumps and presented the old diesel pump to the Kennet and Avon Canal Trust for preservation. Wessex Water Authority agreed to the extraction of 1,000,000 imperial gallons (4,500,000 L) per day from the Avon at Claverton to be pumped east; the cost of the pumps was £175,000.

From 2012 to 2016 the pumping station underwent another restoration of the woodwork, which involved replacing all 288 starts on the waterwheel, and all 96 float and seal boards, as well as the 408 oak teeth of the pit wheel.

Claverton Pumping Station was awarded a National Transport Trust Red Wheel, recognising its historical importance to transport heritage in the United Kingdom. The restoration work received an Engineering Heritage Award from the Institution of Mechanical Engineers and won first place in the Heritage and Conservation category of the Living Waterways Awards 2019.

== Present day ==
The pumping station is maintained by volunteers and is open regularly except during winter maintenance periods. Depending on volunteer numbers, the wheel may be either static or pumping. Pumping days are advertised in advance, but are always subject to river conditions and ageing machinery. There is also a working model of the pumping station in the pumphouse.

== Bibliography ==
- Allsop, Niall (1987). The Kennet & Avon Canal. Bath, UK: Millstream Books. ISBN 978-0-948975-15-8.
- Clew, Kenneth R. (1985). The Kennet & Avon Canal. Newton Abbot, UK: David & Charles. ISBN 0-7153-8656-5.
- Cragg, Roger (1997). Civil Engineering Heritage: Wales and West Central England, 2nd Edition. Thomas Telford. ISBN 0-7277-2576-9.
- Cumberlidge, Jane (2009). Inland Waterways of Great Britain (8th Ed.). Imray Laurie Norie and Wilson. ISBN 978-1-84623-010-3.
- Danks, Warwick (2003). Claverton Pumping Station (A Definitive Study). Kennet & Avon Canal Trust. ISBN 978-0-9501173-4-8.
- Hadfield, Charles (1967). The Canals of South West England. Newton Abbot, UK: David & Charles. ISBN 0-7153-4176-6.
- Lindley-Jones, Peter (2002). Restoring the Kennet & Avon Canal. Stroud, UK: Tempus. ISBN 978-0-7524-2387-6.
- Russell, John (1997). The Kennet & Avon Canal: A journey from Newbury to Bath in 1964. Bath, UK: Millstream Books. ISBN 978-0-948975-46-2.
