= Claverton, Somerset =

Village in Somerset, England

Coordinates: 51.3768°N 2.3110°W

Claverton
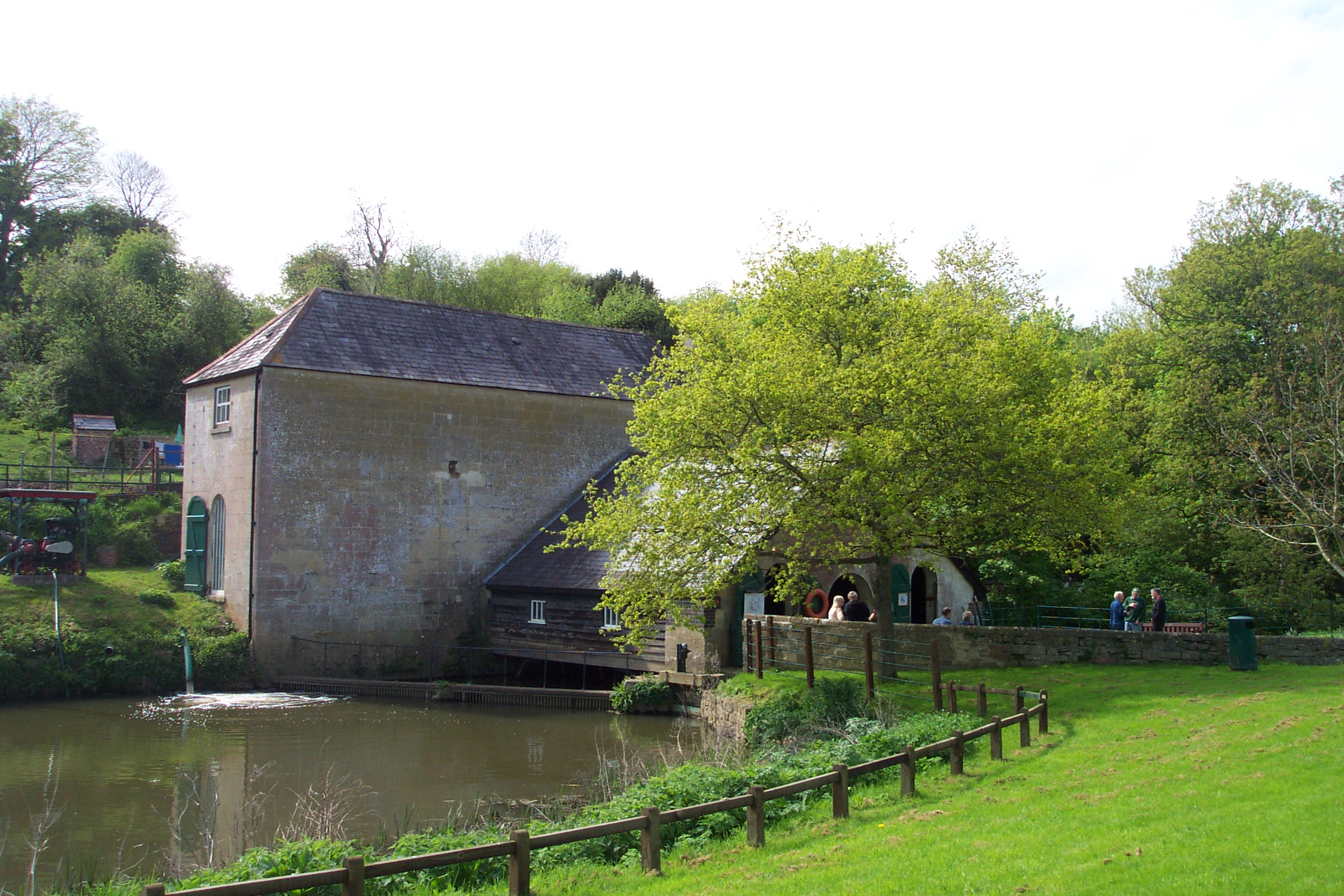
- Claverton Pumping Station

- Location within Somerset
- Population: 115
- OS grid reference: ST784642
- Unitary authority: Bath and North East Somerset
- Ceremonial county: Somerset
- Region: South West
- Country: England
- Sovereign state: United Kingdom
- Post town: BATH
- Postcode district: BA2
- Dialling code: 01225
- Police: Avon and Somerset
- Fire: Avon
- Ambulance: South Western
- UK Parliament: Frome and East Somerset

Claverton is a small village and civil parish about 2 miles (3 km) east of Bath at the southern end of the Cotswolds Area of Outstanding Natural Beauty, in Somerset, England. The parish has a population of 115.

== History ==
The parish was part of the hundred of Hampton.

Claverton Pumping Station was designed in 1810–13 by John Rennie to lift water from the River Avon to the Kennet and Avon Canal, using power from the flow of the river.

Claverton Manor, on the valley slope above the village, is a country house designed by Jeffry Wyatville and completed in 1820. A Grade I listed building in extensive gardens, it has housed the American Museum since 1961.

Claverton was recognised as being of special architectural and historic interest and was designated a Conservation Area in November 1981.

== Governance ==
The parish falls within the unitary authority of Bath and North East Somerset which was created in 1996, as established by the Local Government Act 1992. It provides a single tier of local government with responsibility for almost all local government functions within its area including local planning and building control, local roads, council housing, environmental health, markets and fairs, refuse collection, recycling, cemeteries, crematoria, leisure services, parks, and tourism. It is also responsible for education, social services, libraries, main roads, public transport, trading standards, waste disposal and strategic planning, although fire, police and ambulance services are provided jointly with other authorities through the Avon Fire and Rescue Service, Avon and Somerset Constabulary and the Great Western Ambulance Service.

Bath and North East Somerset's area covers part of the ceremonial county of Somerset but it is administered independently of the non-metropolitan county. Its administrative headquarters is in Bath. Between 1 April 1974 and 1 April 1996, it was the Wansdyke district and the City of Bath of the county of Avon. Before 1974 the parish was part of the Bathavon Rural District.

The Claverton parish council has responsibility for local issues, including setting an annual precept (local rate) to cover its own operating costs, and producing annual accounts for public scrutiny. The parish council is consulted on local planning applications and works with the local police, unitary council officers, and neighbourhood watch groups on matters of crime, security, and traffic. The parish council's role also includes initiating projects for the maintenance and repair of parish facilities, such as the bus shelter. The Parish does not have any public playing fields, playgrounds or community hall. It consults with the unitary council on the maintenance, repair, and improvement of highways, drainage, footpaths, public transport, and street cleaning. Its views are also sought on conservation matters, including trees and listed buildings, and on environmental issues.

Claverton is represented in the House of Commons of the Parliament of the United Kingdom as part of Frome and East Somerset, which elects one member of parliament by the first past the post system of election. It was also part of the South West England constituency of the European Parliament prior to Britain leaving the European Union in January 2020, which in 2019 elected seven MEPs using the d'Hondt method of party-list proportional representation.

== Religious sites ==
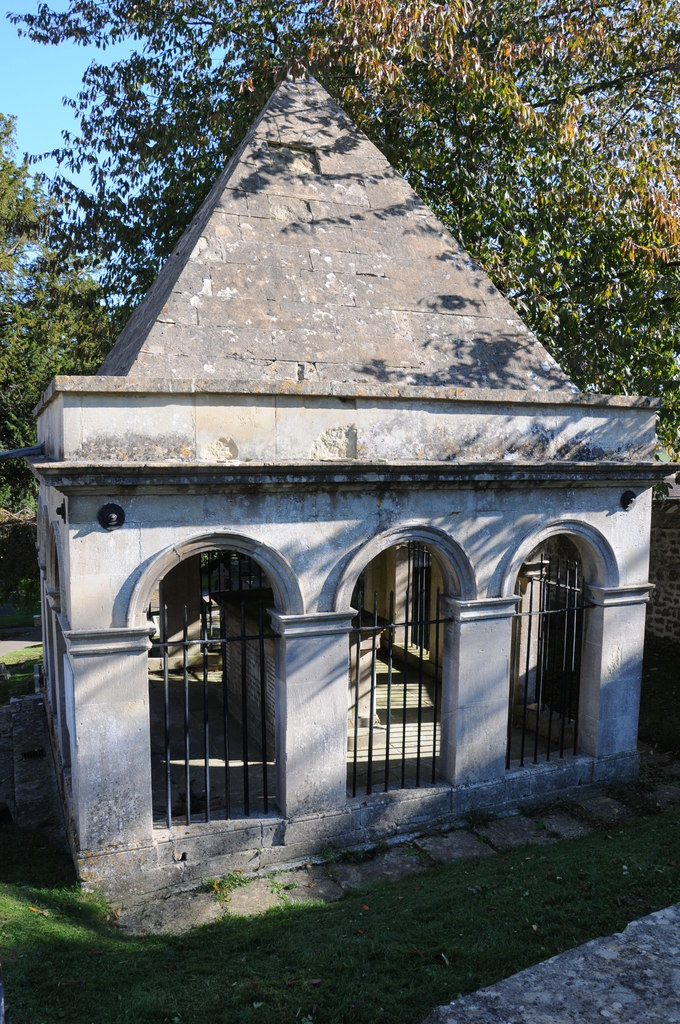
Mausoleum containing the tomb of Ralph Allen

The church of St Mary the Virgin has a Norman tower and contains a peal of six bells including three dated 1637. Other parts of the church date from the 13th century, but underwent extensive renovation in 1858. Ralph Allen of Prior Park is buried in a pyramid-topped tomb in Claverton churchyard.

== Notable people ==
- The Rev. John Skinner (1772 – 1839) was born in Claverton.
