= Kennet and Avon Canal =

Canal in southern England

Coordinates: 51°22′30″N 2°18′8″W

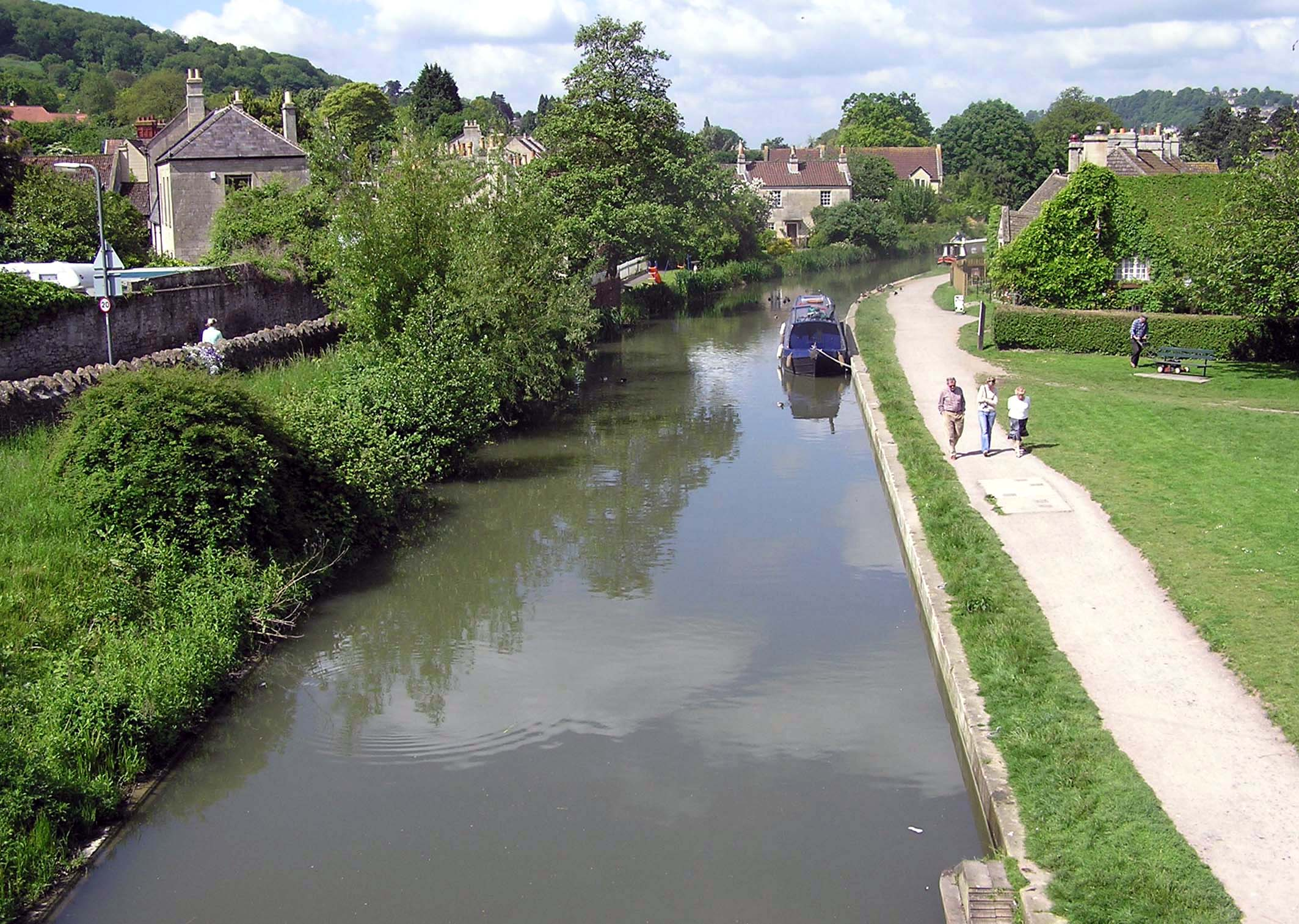
- The canal at Bathampton, near Bath
- Interactive map of Kennet and Avon Canal

Specifications
- Length: 87 miles (140 km)
- Maximum boat length: 72 ft 0 in (21.95 m)
- Maximum boat beam: 13 ft 6 in (4.11 m)
- Locks: 105
- Maximum height AMSL: 450 ft (140 m)
- Status: Open
- Navigation authority: Canal & River Trust

History
- Construction began: 1718
- Date of first use: 1723
- Date completed: 1810
- Date restored: 1960s–1990

Geography
- Start point: Bristol (Floating Harbour)
- End point: Reading (River Thames)
- Connects to: Somerset Coal Canal; Wilts and Berks Canal

The Kennet and Avon Canal is a waterway in southern England with an overall length of 87 miles (140 km), made up of two lengths of navigable river linked by a canal. The name is used to refer to the entire length of the navigation rather than solely to the central canal section. From Bristol to Bath the waterway follows the natural course of the River Avon before the canal links it to the River Kennet at Newbury, and from there to Reading on the River Thames. In all, the waterway incorporates 105 locks.

The two river stretches were made navigable in the early 18th century, and the 57-mile (92 km) canal section was constructed between 1794 and 1810. In the late 19th and early 20th centuries, the canal gradually fell into disuse after the opening of the Great Western Railway. In the latter half of the 20th century the canal was restored in stages, largely by volunteers. After decades of dereliction and much restoration work, it was fully reopened in 1990. The Kennet and Avon Canal has been developed as a popular heritage tourism destination for boating, canoeing, fishing, walking and cycling, and is also important for wildlife conservation.

== History ==
=== Early plans ===
The idea of an east-to-west waterway link across southern England was first mentioned in Elizabethan times, between 1558 and 1603, to take advantage of the proximity of tributaries of the rivers Avon and Thames, only 3 miles (5 km) apart at their closest. Later, around 1626, Henry Briggs made a survey of the two rivers and noted that the land between them was level and easy to dig. He proposed a canal to connect them, but following his death in 1630 the plan was dropped. After the English Civil War four bills were presented to parliament, but all failed after opposition from gentry, farmers and traders worried about cheaper water transport reducing the value of fees on turnpike roads they controlled, and cheaper produce from Wales undercutting locally produced food.

The main alternative to road transport for the carriage of goods between Bristol and London was a hazardous sea route through the English Channel. The small coastal sailing ships of the day were often damaged by Atlantic storms, and risked being attacked by warships of the French Navy and privateers during a succession of conflicts with France.

=== River navigations ===
Plans for a waterway were shelved until the early 18th century. However, in 1715, work was authorised to make the River Kennet navigable from Reading to Newbury. Work commenced in 1718, under the supervision of surveyor and engineer John Hore of Newbury. In 1723, despite considerable local opposition, the Kennet Navigation opened, comprising stretches of natural riverbed alternating with 11 miles (18 km) of artificially created lock cuts.

The River Avon had historically been navigable from Bristol to Bath, but construction of watermills on the river in the early years of the 13th century had forced its closure. In 1727, navigation was restored, with the construction of six locks, again under the supervision of John Hore. The first cargo of "Deal boards, Pig-Lead and Meal" reached Bath in December.

The two river navigations were built independently of one another, in order to meet local needs, but they eventually led to plans to connect them and form a through route.

=== Closing the gap ===
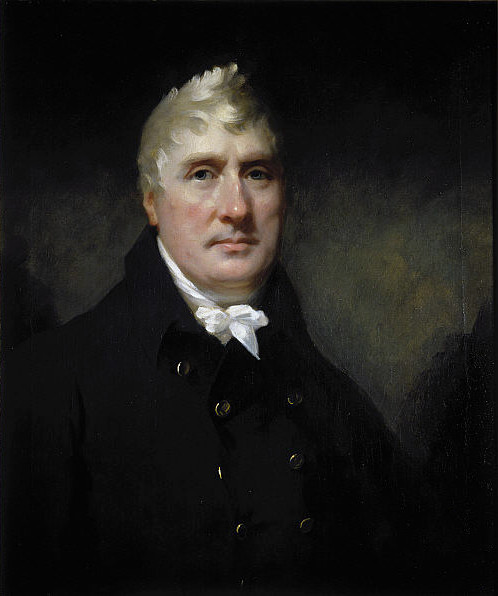
Surveyor John Rennie by Henry Raeburn, 1810

==== Proposals ====
In 1788, a "Western Canal" was proposed to improve trade and communication links to towns such as Hungerford, Marlborough, Calne, Chippenham and Melksham. The following year the engineers Barns, Simcock and Weston submitted a proposed route for this canal, although there were doubts about the adequacy of the water supply. The name was changed from Western Canal to Kennet and Avon Canal to avoid confusion with the Grand Western Canal, which was being proposed at the same time. This came in the midst of the Canal Mania period, with shares oversubscribed and reports of riotous crowds gathering outside meetings.

In 1793, a further survey was conducted by John Rennie, and the route of the canal was altered to take a more southerly course through Great Bedwyn, Devizes, Trowbridge and Newbury. The proposed route was accepted by the Kennet and Avon Canal Company, chaired by Charles Dundas, and the company started to take subscriptions from prospective shareholders. In July 1793, Rennie suggested further alterations to the route, including the construction of a tunnel in the Savernake Forest.

==== Organisation ====
Kennet and Avon Canal Act 1794
- Act of Parliament
- Parliament of Great Britain
- Long title: An Act for making a navigable canal from the river Kennet, at or near the town of Newbury, in the county of Berks, to the river Avon, at or near the city of Bath; and also certain navigable cuts therein described.
- Citation: 34 Geo. 3. c. 90
- Territorial extent: Great Britain

Dates
- Royal assent: 17 April 1794
- Commencement: 17 April 1794 (Note: The Acts of Parliament (Commencement) Act 1793.)
Other legislation
Amended by	Kennet and Avon Canal Act 1796; Kennet and Avon Canal Act 1798; Kennet and Avon Canal Act 1801; Kennet and Avon Canal Act 1805

Status: Amended

Text of statute as originally enacted

Kennet and Avon Canal Act 1796
- Act of Parliament
- Parliament of Great Britain
- Long title: An act to vary and alter the line of the canal, authorised to be made by an act passed in the thirty-fourth year of the reign of his present Majesty, intituled, "An act for making a navigable canal from the river Kennet, at or near the town or Newbury, in the county of Berks, to the river Avon, at or near the city of Bath; and also certain navigable cuts therein described;" and to amend the said act; and also to make a certain navigable cut therein described.
- Citation: 36 Geo. 3. c. 44
- Territorial extent: Great Britain

Dates
- Royal assent: 24 March 1796
- Commencement: 24 March 1796
Other legislation
Amends	Kennet and Avon Canal Act 1794
Amended by	Kennet and Avon Canal Act 1798; Kennet and Avon Canal Act 1801; Kennet and Avon Canal Act 1805

Status: Amended

Text of statute as originally enacted

Kennet and Avon Canal Act 1798
- Act of Parliament
- Parliament of Great Britain
- Long title: An act to vary the line of the Kennet and Avon canal authorised to be made by two acts passed in the thirty-forth and thirty-sixth years of the reign of his present Majesty, and also to extend the powers of and to amend the said acts.
- Citation: 37 Geo. 3. c. xviii
- Territorial extent: Great Britain

Dates
- Royal assent: 7 May 1797
- Commencement: 7 May 1797
Other legislation
Amends	Kennet and Avon Canal Act 1794; Kennet and Avon Canal Act 1796
Amended by	Kennet and Avon Canal Act 1805; Kennet and Avon Canal Act 1809

Status: Amended

Text of statute as originally enacted

On 17 April 1794, the Kennet and Avon Canal Act 1794 (34 Geo. 3. c. 90) received royal assent and construction began.

Responsibility for construction was divided across three committees: the Western District, the central Wiltshire District (which was later absorbed into the Western in 1802), and the Eastern District. These awarded contracts and had delegated financial powers. Problems with contractors occurred on multiple occasions, sometimes being overenthusiastic about tendering for multiple sections of work, failing to survey ground conditions thoroughly and encountering difficulties such as rock or natural springs.

Construction began at Bradford-on-Avon in the west, and Newbury in the east, in October 1794.

==== Western section: Bath to Foxhangers ====
The first sod for the Kennet and Avon Canal was turned in Bradford-on-Avon, and soon there were wharves above and below Bradford Lock. The canal was complete from Bath to Foxhangers (a farm at the western foot of Caen Hill, below Devizes) 6.5 years after construction started, in May 1801.

==== Eastern section: Newbury to Devizes ====
In 1796, completion of the eastern end of the new canal from Newbury to Great Bedwyn was anticipated within 12 months; but by July of that year, inflationary effects of the French Revolutionary Wars led labourers to take up more lucrative harvest work, and 23% of shareholders had fallen into arrears. Water springs encountered between Newbury and Crofton also caused delays.

On 12 June 1797, the first section from Newbury to Kintbury was opened, with a band from the 15th Regiment of Dragoons playing aboard the first barge to travel upstream, and chairman Charles Dundas joining the return passage back to Newbury. Construction continued uphill towards Hungerford, where seven houses in the path of the canal were demolished and a new road bridge provided. On 9 October 1798, the first cargo barge arrived in Hungerford, carrying a Portland stone staircase and Russian tallow – about 40 long tons (41 t; 45 short tons) in all. By 2 July 1799, the canal was open as far west as Great Bedwyn. The summit beyond Great Bedwyn, and subsequent gentle descent to Devizes, remained incomplete as late as 1803.

==== Completion ====
The final engineering task was the completion of the Caen Hill Locks at Devizes. While the lock flight was under construction, a horse-drawn railway provided a link between Foxhangers at the bottom of the flight and Devizes at the top, the remains of which can be seen under the towpath arches in the road bridges over the canal.

The canal opened to through-traffic in 1810, after 16 years of construction. As well as Caen Hill Locks, other major structures included the Dundas and Avoncliff aqueducts, the Bruce Tunnel near Savernake Forest, and the pumping stations at Claverton and Crofton, needed to overcome water supply difficulties.

=== Operation ===
Kennet and Avon Canal Company and River Kennet Navigation Act 1813
- Act of Parliament
- Parliament of the United Kingdom
- Long title: An Act to enable the Kennet and Avon Canal Company to raise a further Sum of Money to purchase the Shares of the River Kennet Navigation; and to amend the several Acts passed for making the said Canal.
- Citation: 53 Geo. 3. c. cxix
- Territorial extent: United Kingdom

Dates
- Royal assent: 3 June 1813
- Commencement: 3 June 1813
Other legislation
Amended by	Great Western Railway Act 1837
Relates to	Berks and Hants Railway Act 1845

Status: Amended

Text of statute as originally enacted

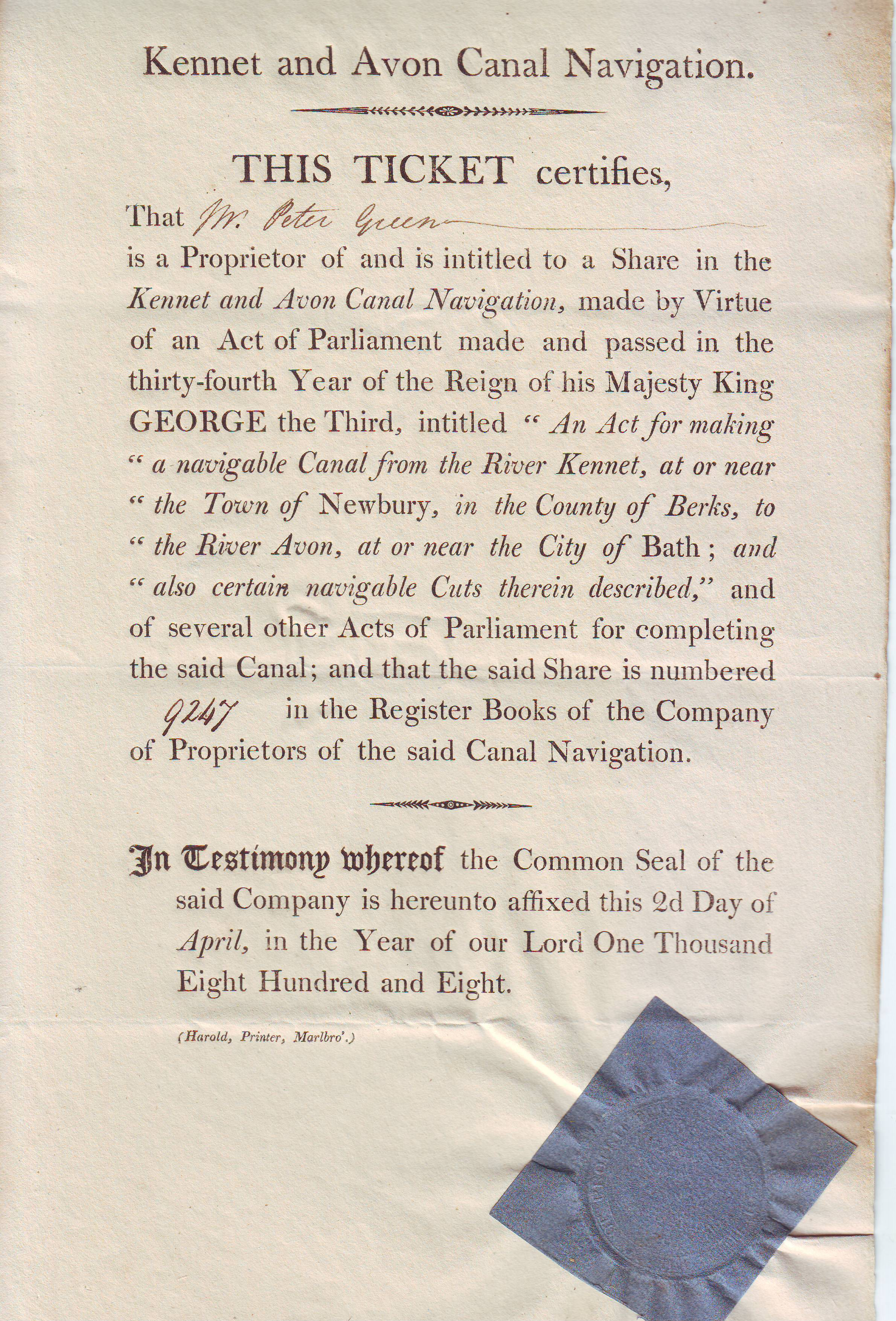
Kennet and Avon Canal Navigation share (ticket), issued 2 April 1808

In 1801, trade along the canal commenced; goods initially had to be unloaded at Foxhangers at the bottom of what is now Caen Hill Locks, transported up the hill by a horse-drawn tramway, and reloaded into barges at the top. When the flight of locks opened in 1810, allowing the same vessel to navigate the entire canal, the rate of carriage per ton from London to Bath was £2 9s 6d. This compared well with carriage by road, which cost £6 3s to £7 per ton, and trade on the canal flourished. In 1812, the Kennet and Avon Canal Company bought the Kennet Navigation, which stretched from Newbury to the junction with the Thames at Kennet Mouth, near Reading. The purchase from Frederick Page cost £100,000, of which £70,000 was paid in cash with the balance paid back gradually. The purchase was authorised by the Kennet and Avon Canal Company and River Kennet Navigation Act 1813 (53 Geo. 3. c. cxix), which enabled the company to raise the funds through the sale of 5,500 shares at £24 each. At the same time work was undertaken to improve the Avon Navigation, from Bristol to Bath, with the Kennet and Avon Canal Company purchasing a majority shareholding in the Avon Navigation in 1816.

By 1818, seventy 60-ton barges were working on the canal, the majority of the tonnage being coal and stone travelling via the Somerset Coal Canal. The journey from Bath to Newbury took an average of three and a half days. By 1832, 300,000 tons of freight was being carried each year and, between 1825 and 1834, the company had an annual revenue of around £45,000.

A link connecting the Kennet & Avon to the Basingstoke Canal at its Basingstoke terminus – the Berks and Hants Canal – was proposed three times between 1793 and 1810, and a route was even surveyed by John Rennie the Younger in 1824, but following opposition from landowners was eventually rejected by Parliament in 1824 and 1826.

=== Decline ===
The opening of the Great Western Railway in 1841 removed much of the canal's traffic, even though the canal company lowered tariffs. In 1852, the railway company took over the canal's operation, levying high tolls at every toll point and reducing the amount spent on maintenance. Ice-breaking was stopped in 1857, and traders were further encouraged by preferential tolls to use the railway rather than the canal. In 1861, a new order prohibited any traffic on the canal at night, and, in 1865, boats were forced to pass through locks in pairs to reduce water loss. By 1868, the annual tonnage had fallen from 360,610 in 1848 to 210,567. In the 1870s, water abstraction from the canal near Fobney Lock followed the regulations introduced in the Reading Local Board Waterworks, Sewerage, Drainage and Improvement Act 1870 (33 & 34 Vict. c. cxxxiii), and contributed to the silting up of locks and stretches of the canal. Several wharves and stretches of towpath were closed. In 1877, the canal recorded a deficit of £1,920 and never subsequently made any profit.

The Somerset Coal Canal and Wilts & Berks Canal, which each supplied some of the trade from the Somerset Coalfield to the Kennet and Avon, closed in 1904 and 1906 respectively. In 1926, following a loss of £18,041 the previous year, the Great Western Railway sought to close the canal by obtaining a Ministry of Transport order, but the move was resisted and the company charged with improving its maintenance of the canal. Cargo trade continued to decline, but a few pleasure boats started to use the canal.

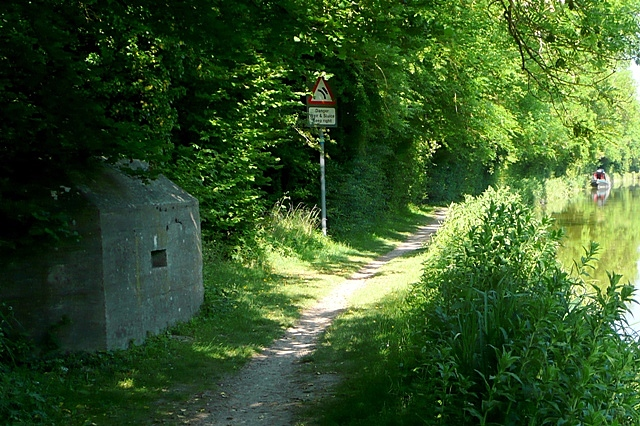
A Second World War pillbox near Kintbury

During the Second World War, a large number of concrete pillboxes were built as part of the GHQ Line - Blue to defend against an expected German invasion; many of these are still visible along the banks of the canal. They were generally built close to road and rail bridges, which would have formed important crossing points for enemy troops and vehicles. After the war, the Transport Act 1947 transferred control of the canal to the British Transport Commission, but by the 1950s large sections of the canal had been closed because of poor lock maintenance following a breach in the bank west of the Avoncliff Aqueduct. The last through passage was made in 1951 by nb Queen.

=== Closure avoided ===
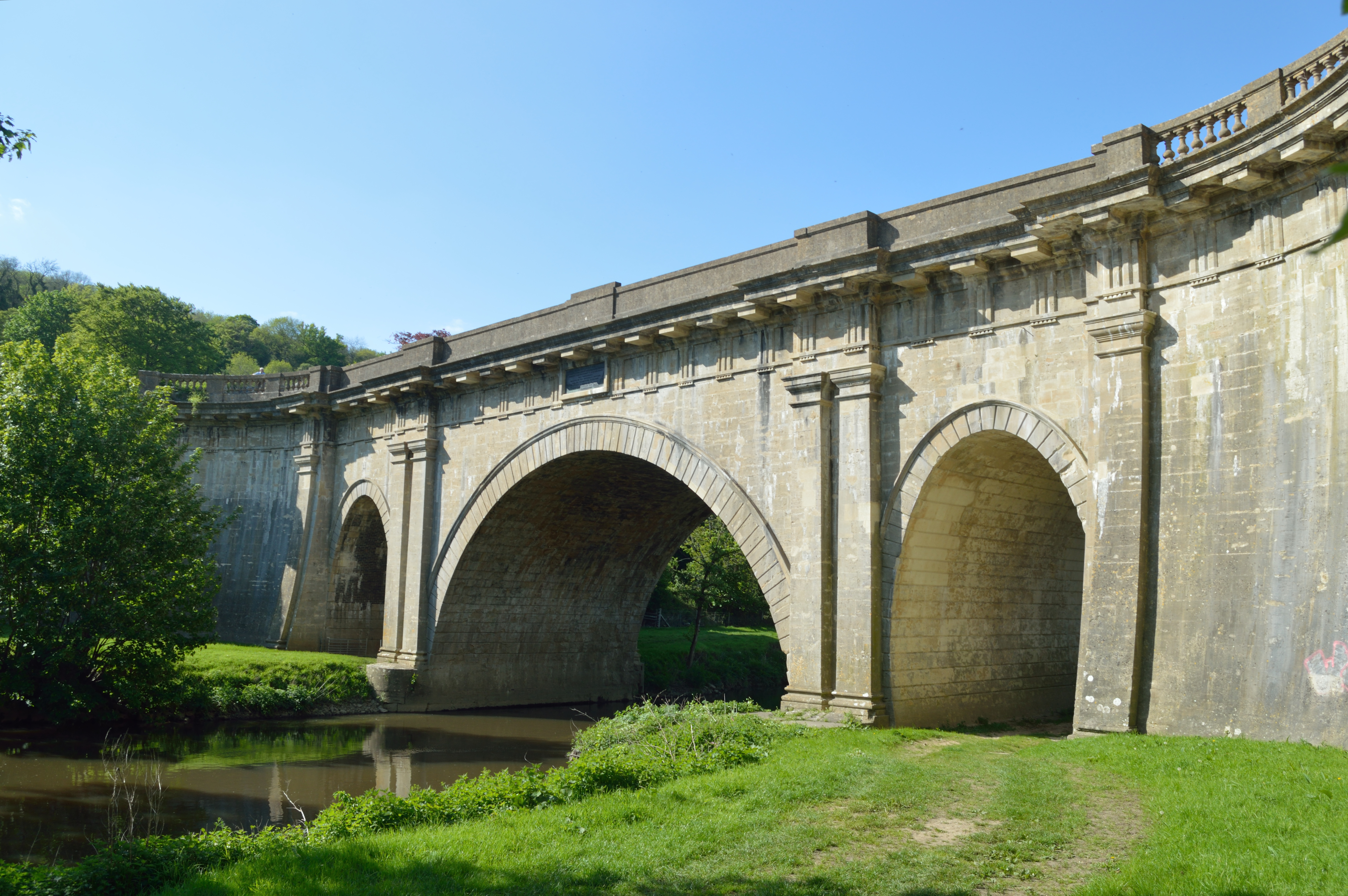
Dundas Aqueduct near Limpley Stoke

A group supporting the restoration of the canal had been set up in the early 1950s independently of the Inland Waterways Association, with which it was subsequently merged. In 1955 John Gould, a trader on the eastern section of the waterway, successfully petitioned against the commission's failure to maintain the waterway and obtained damages for loss of business. In March 1956 a clause in the British Transport Commission (No. 2) Bill was presented to Parliament that would have removed the right of navigation between Reading and Bath. The bill was opposed by Gould and by the local authorities along the canal. They were supported by a 22,000-signature petition to the Queen, brought to London from Bristol by water; parts of the canal had to be traversed by canoe. This campaign led to an inquiry by a parliamentary select committee. The committee supported the suspension of the right of navigation, and the Bill passed through the House of Commons but was amended by the House of Lords to include a clause in the final British Transport Commission Act 1956 (4 & 5 Eliz. 2. c. lxxiv) to enforce "no further deterioration". In July 1958, the Bowes Committee published their Inquiry into Inland Waterways which specifically mentioned the Kennet and Avon finding "no justification for restoring the section from Reading to Bath".

A government white paper followed the Bowes Report in February 1959, recommending that an Inland Waterways Redevelopment Advisory Committee should assist schemes to regenerate canals that were no longer able to collect enough fees from tolls to pay for their upkeep. Further reports followed, and in 1962 the Advisory Committee reported that the canal should be redeveloped, and allocated £20,000 for maintenance and £20,000 to begin restoration. The Kennet and Avon Canal Trust was formed in 1962 to restore the canal from Reading to Bristol as a through navigation and as a public amenity. It was originally a voluntary group which had previously been known as the Kennet and Avon Canal Association. The trust gained charitable status in April and was incorporated under the Companies Act 1948 on 6 June 1962. In 1963 the newly formed British Waterways, which was created by the Transport Act 1962 of the previous year, and replaced the British Transport Commission as the statutory body for inland waterways, took over the canal and, in partnership with the trust and riparian local authorities, restoration work began.

=== Restoration ===
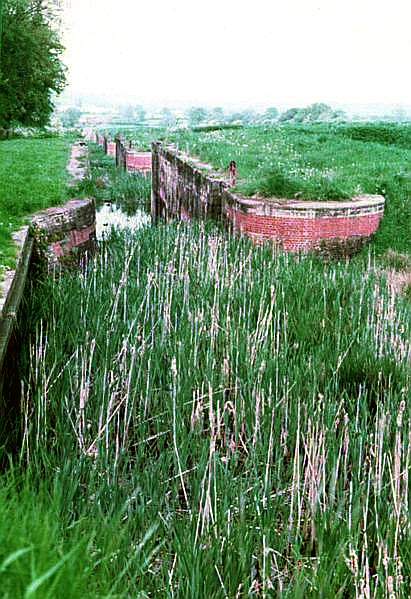
Caen Hill Locks in the 1970s

Restoration work involved a collaboration between staff from British Waterways and volunteer labour. In 1966 Sulhamstead Lock was rebuilt and the re-puddling of the dry section at Limpley Stoke was begun. In 1968, restoration work was undertaken on the Bath Locks and Burghfield Lock. In Reading at Bridge Street the navigable headroom had been reduced from 8 ft 6 in (2.59 m) to 4 ft 6 in (1.37 m) by girders added to the underside of the bridge. This was replaced with a new bridge, enabling craft to pass more easily. The canal was reopened from the Thames to Hungerford Wharf in July 1974. Re-puddling was a long process, so experiments with the use of heavy gauge polythene to line the canal were undertaken. The Avoncliff Aqueduct was lined with a concrete "cradle" and made water-tight in 1980.

Further works continued during the 1980s. Berkshire County Council, supported by local councils, estimated that £1,275,000 was needed for works at the eastern end of the canal and commenced work on replacing some of the bridges. In Wiltshire, concerns over the limited water supply to the summit pound indicated that back-pumping would be required, which increased the estimated cost for the county to £761,560. The Wilton Water reservoir was estimated to produce less than 750,000 imperial gallons (3,400 m^{3}) per day, and the Seend feeder only 250,000 imp gal (1,100 m^{3}). Wessex Water Authority agreed to the extraction of 1,000,000 imp gal (4,500 m^{3}) per day from the Avon at Claverton to be pumped east; the costs of the pumps were £175,000.

Various fund-raising schemes, along with some financial support from local authorities, allowed small-scale work on the locks to continue, but the projected timescales for completion were missed. In 1983 the Manpower Services Commission, which had a remit to co-ordinate employment and training services in the United Kingdom, agreed to employ 50 men on work that included restoration of Aldermaston Lock, its adjacent wharf, and Widmead Lock. The restoration of Dundas Aqueduct and several smaller schemes were later added to the list. Maintenance agreements were signed with local authorities along the route, while fund-raising activities continued. The National Association for the Care and Resettlement of Offenders sponsored a workshop, which opened in Shrivenham in 1987, to create new lock gates for the Crofton and Devizes flights. In 1988 the restoration of Woolhampton Lock was completed, but obstructions remained on either side. Frouds swing bridge could not be opened and the restoration of Midgham Lock had not been finished; both were completed the following year. Re-puddling of the Crofton pounds was carried out in 1989, along with the reconstruction of Midgham Bridge. Restoration of the turf-sided Monkey Marsh Lock proved difficult because of its status as a scheduled monument, and the consequent need to protect the historic site while improving safety.

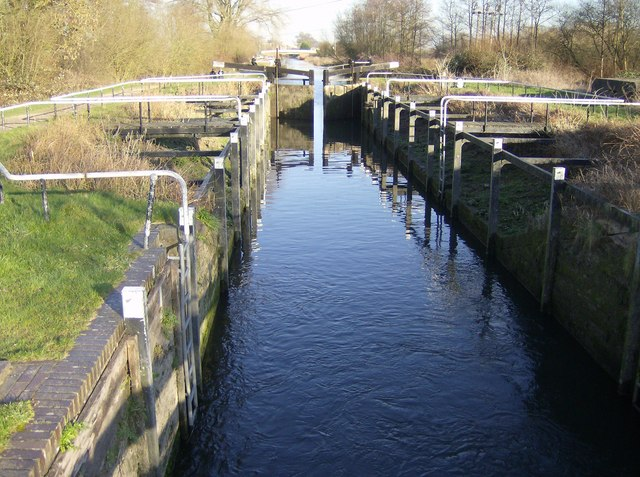
Monkey Marsh Lock built in 1723, one of only two turf-sided locks on the Kennet and Avon Canal

The stretch between Reading and Newbury was completed on 17 July 1990; at a ceremony held at Monkey Marsh Lock several boats competed to be the first craft through. Concerns about the adequacy of the water supply still remained when Elizabeth II formally reopened the canal on 8 August 1990. The Queen was able to travel on the Trust's boat, The Rose of Hungerford, through locks 44 and 43 on the Caen Hill flight, breaking a ceremonial tape between them. The shortage of water was addressed in 1996 by the installation of new back pumps at the flight of 29 locks at Caen Hill in Devizes, at a cost of £1 million. The pumps raise water 235 feet (72 m) at a rate of 300,000 imperial gallons (1,400 m^{3}) per hour (380 litres per second). In October 1996, the Kennet & Avon Canal Partnership attracted the largest single National Lottery grant awarded by the Heritage Lottery Fund, £25 million towards a £29 million project, to complete the restoration and to make it operational, sustainable and accessible for the enjoyment of future generations. The work funded included complete rebuilding of Foxhangers Lock and bridge at Caen Hill, replacement of lock gates at Seend and Crofton, channel lining at Claverton, embankment repairs at Martinslade, improvements at Claverton pumping station and dredging at various sites. The restoration's completion was celebrated in May 2003 by a visit from Prince Charles, but upgrading and maintenance continues. Between 2002 and 2004, Dundas Aqueduct – which had been relined with polythene and concrete in 1984 without disturbing a colony of bats living under the aqueduct – was further restored by the replacement of engineering bricks used by the Great Western Railway with Bath stone to match the original work.

On 1 December 2004, two men died when the Ford tractor in which they were reversing along part of the towpath between Bridge 111 and Bridge 110 toppled into the water. British Waterways was found guilty of failing to adequately assess risk and fined £100,000. A subsequent dispute with their insurers gave rise to legal consideration of the meaning of certain terminology in their insurance policy concerned with liability "arising out of" the operation of a tractor.

In 2011 the Department for Environment, Food and Rural Affairs designated the canal a national "cruiseway" as defined by the Transport Act 1968. The listing imposes a legal requirement on British Waterways to maintain the canal to a standard that ensures cruising craft can safely navigate the entire length of the waterway. In November 2011 the navigation between Bath and Bristol was closed for several months because of safety concerns about Victoria Bridge.

== Route ==
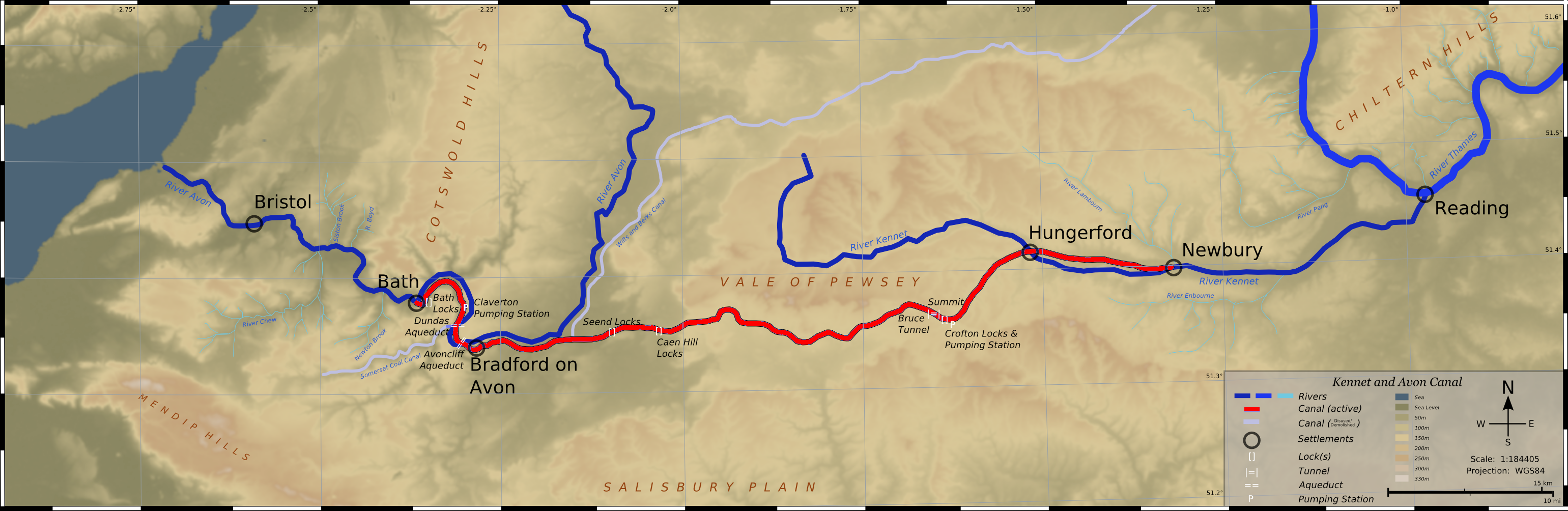
The Kennet and Avon Canal. The route of the canal, between Newbury and Bath, is in red.

=== Bristol to Bath ===
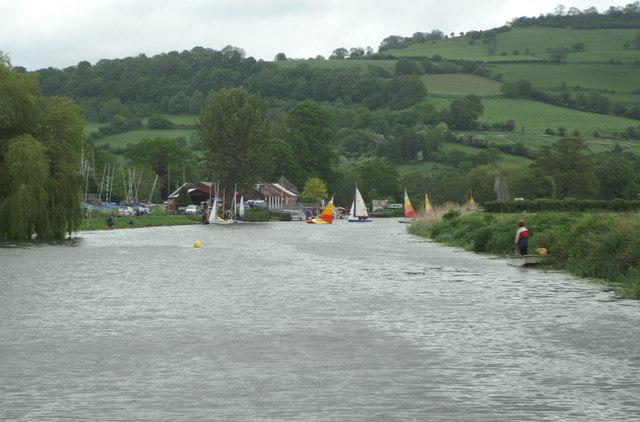
River Avon above Saltford Lock

The River Avon was navigable from Bristol to Bath during the early years of the 13th century, until the construction of mills on the river forced its closure. The modern Avon is navigable from its mouth at Avonmouth, through the Floating Harbour in Bristol, as far as Pulteney Weir in the centre of Bath and just beyond the start of the canal. Beyond Pulteney Weir the Avon is still navigable as far as the weir and site of the old "flash lock" at Bathampton but the lock at Pulteney has been replaced only with a small boat slide for dinghies and canoes. The stretch from Bristol to Bath is made navigable by the use of locks and weirs at Hanham, Keynsham, Swineford, Saltford, Kelston and Weston, which together overcome a rise of 30 feet (9 m) within 12 miles (19 km).

Lock number one on the Kennet and Avon Canal is Hanham Lock, first opened as part of the Avon Navigation in 1727. It is the first lock east of Netham, the upstream limit of the Floating Harbour, beyond the suburbs of the city of Bristol. A colliery wharf was sited just west of the lock, but the nearby coal mines closed in the 19th century. The river below Hanham Lock is considered to be tidal, as high tides often pass over the weir at Netham. Some spring tides pass over the weir at Hanham, making the river tidal up to Keynsham Lock. Heading east, the river passes the Somerdale Factory, on its southern bank, which was a chocolate production factory for Cadbury – originally built by the Fry family in the 1920s and 1930s. On the northern bank is Cleeve Wood, the primary scientific importance of which lies in its particularly large population of Bath asparagus (Ornithogalum pyrenaicum). A public house has been built on the island between Keynsham Lock and the weir. The weir side of the island is also the mouth of the River Chew.

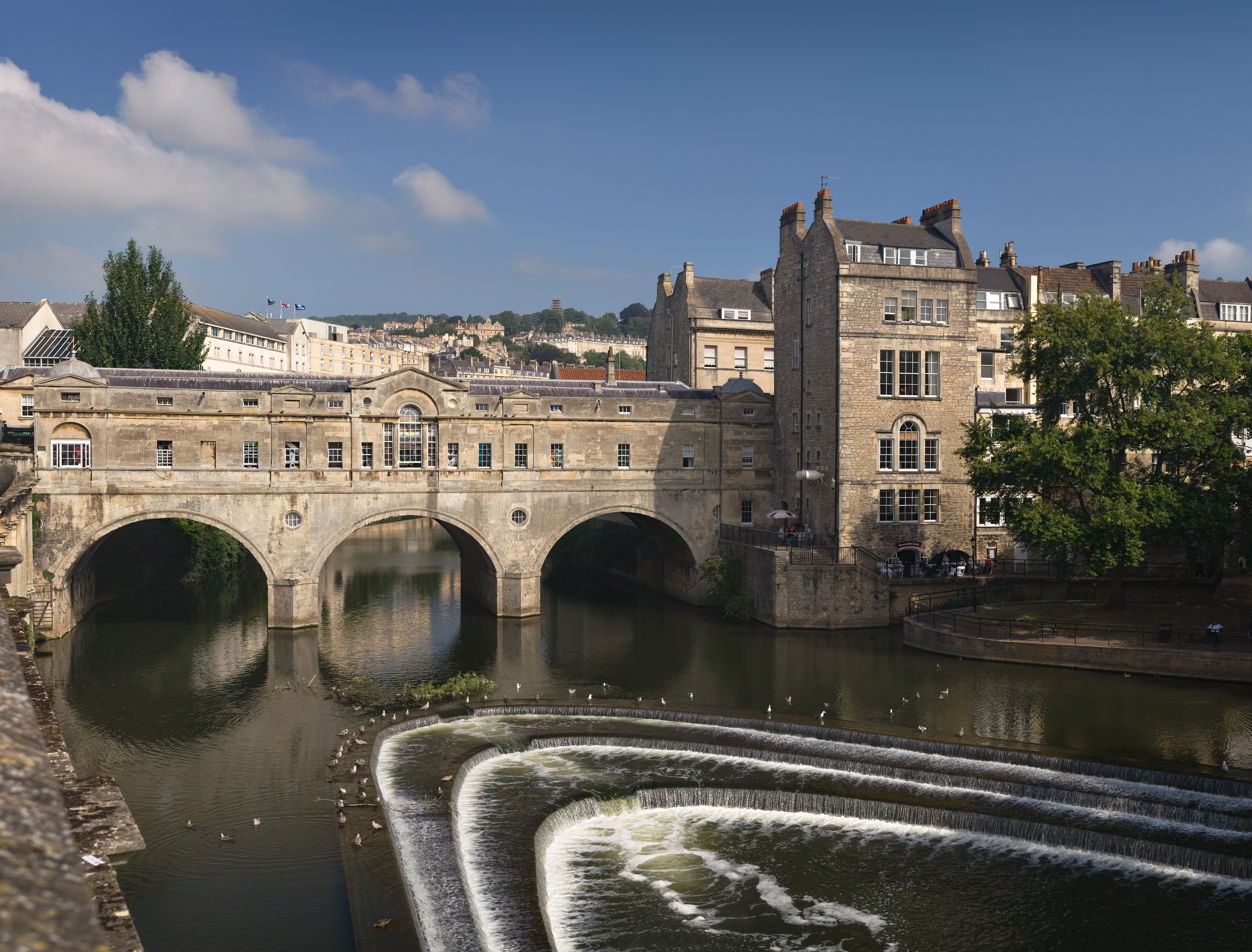
The weir at Pulteney Bridge, the limit of navigation on the River Avon

The river then passes through Avon Valley Country Park and past Stidham Farm, another SSSI that contains Pleistocene terrace-gravels of the river. A depth of at least 7 feet (2 m) of sandy gravels are recorded, consisting mainly of limestone clasts, but also with Millstone Grit, Pennant Sandstone, flint, and chert clasts. The river passes under the old railway line that now forms the Avon Valley Railway, a three-mile-long (5 km) heritage railway, before reaching Swineford Lock. Here, between 1709 and 1859, there was an active brass and copper industry served by the river, which also provided water power for the cloth industry. The remains of Kelston Brass Mill, which was working until 1925, are next to Saltford Lock. The lock was opened in 1727 but destroyed by rival coal dealers in 1738, to prevent the river being used for transportation.

The Bristol and Bath Railway Path crosses the navigation several times before reaching the suburb of Newbridge on the outskirts of Bath. Here the A4 crosses close to the Newton St Loe SSSI, which is designated an SSSI because it represents the only remaining known exposure of fossiliferous Pleistocene gravels containing the remains of mammoths (Mammuthus) and horses (Equus) along the river, and has aided the development of a scientific understanding of the history of early glaciation in South West England. The final lock before entering Bath is Weston Lock, opened in 1727. Its construction created an island between the cut and the river weir, which became known as Dutch Island after the owner of the brass mill established on the riverside in the early 18th century.

=== Bath to Devizes ===
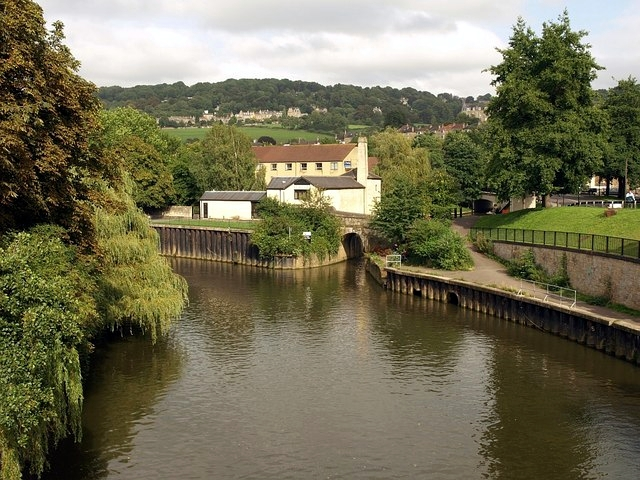
Entrance to the canal from the River Avon in Bath

The restored Bath Bottom Lock marks the divergence of the River Avon and the canal. It is situated south of Pulteney Bridge. Just upstream of the Bottom Lock are a side pound and a pumping station that pumps water "upstream" of the locks, to replace that used each time a boat passes through. The next of the six Bath Locks is Bath Deep Lock, numbered 8/9 as two locks were combined when the canal was restored in 1976. The new chamber has a depth of 19 feet 5 inches (5.92 m), making it the UK's second-deepest canal lock. Just above the Deep Lock is another side pound as a reservoir for refilling the lock, followed by Wash House Lock. After a slightly longer pound is Abbey View Lock, beside which there is another pumping station and then, in quick succession, Pulteney Lock and Bath Top Lock.

Above the Top Lock the canal passes through Sydney Gardens via two short tunnels and under two cast iron footbridges dating from 1800. Cleveland Tunnel is 173 feet (53 m) long and runs under Cleveland House, the former headquarters of the Kennet and Avon Canal Company and now a Grade II* listed building. A trap-door in the tunnel roof connects the canal with Cleveland House. It is often stated that was used to pass paperwork between clerks above and bargees below, although it is possible that the hatch was a refuse chute. Many of the bridges over the canal are listed buildings.

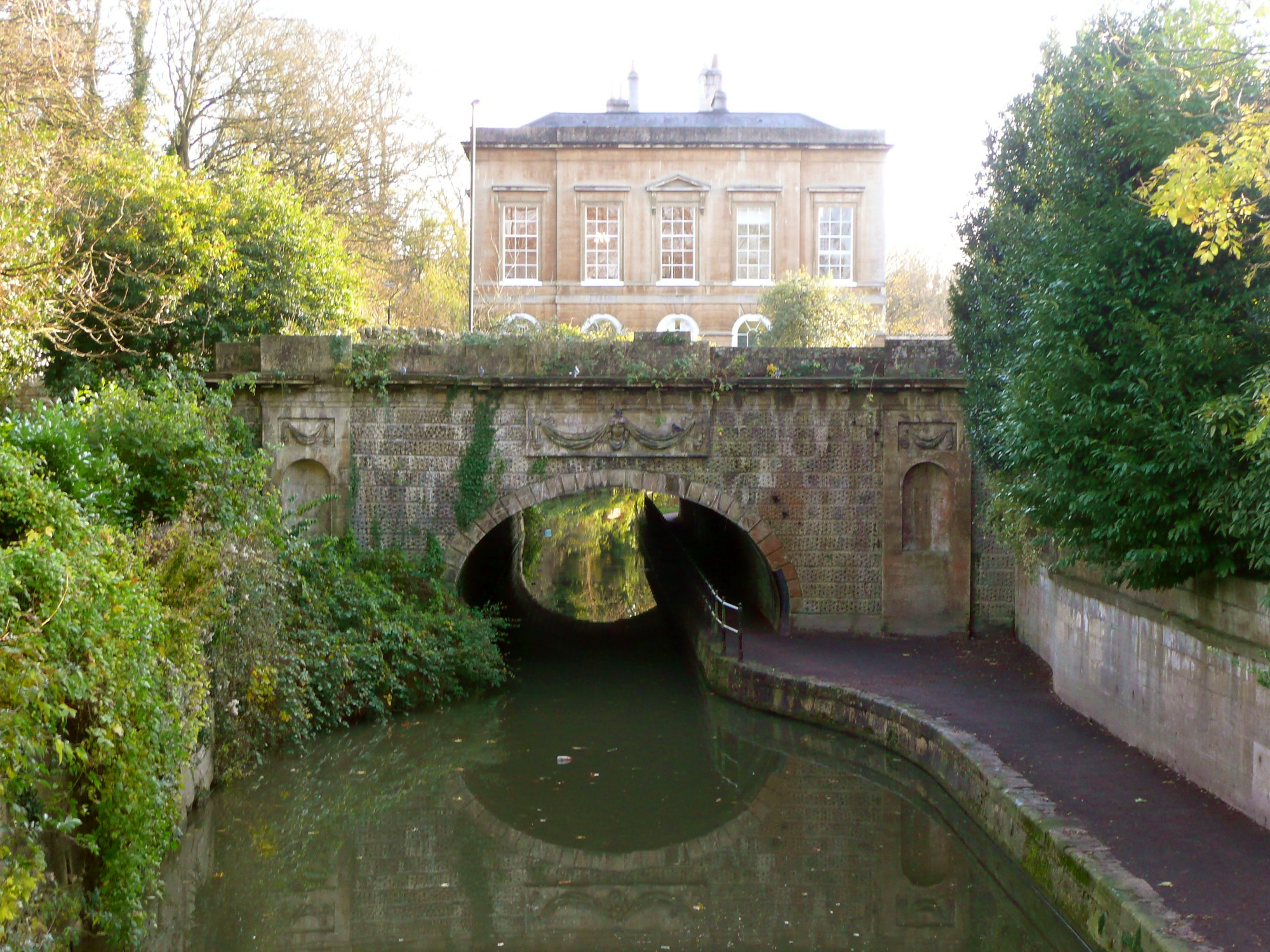
Cleveland House in Sydney Gardens, Bath

On the eastern outskirts of Bath a toll bridge near the George Inn links Bathampton to Batheaston, on the north bank of the canal. When the A4 Batheaston by-pass was built, the 22-acre (8.9 ha) Bathampton Meadow was created to provide additional flood relief. The resultant wet meadows and oxbow lake have proved attractive to a number of migrants; wading birds such as dunlin, ringed and little ringed plover, and green and common sandpiper are frequent visitors in spring and autumn. Sand martin and kingfisher have been seen regularly by the lake, and other migrants have included yellow wagtail, whinchat and hobby. The canal turns south into a valley between Bathampton Wood and Bathford Hill which includes Brown's Folly, a 99-acre (40 ha) biological and geological Site of Special Scientific Interest.

In the Avon Valley to the east of Bath the classic geographical example of a valley with all four forms of ground transport is found: road, rail, river, canal. The canal passes the remains of a loading dock, once used for Bath Stone from the quarries on Bathampton Down, which was carried down a straight track to the canal over the Dry Arch rock bridge (demolished in 1958 to allow double-decker buses to use the A36). Next, the canal passes the waterwheel-powered Claverton Pumping Station, which pumped water from the River Avon into the canal. The building was completed in 1810 and the pump was working by 1813.

On the eastern bank Warleigh Wood and Inwood are ash-wych elm and ash-maple dry woodland, which comes right down to the canal.

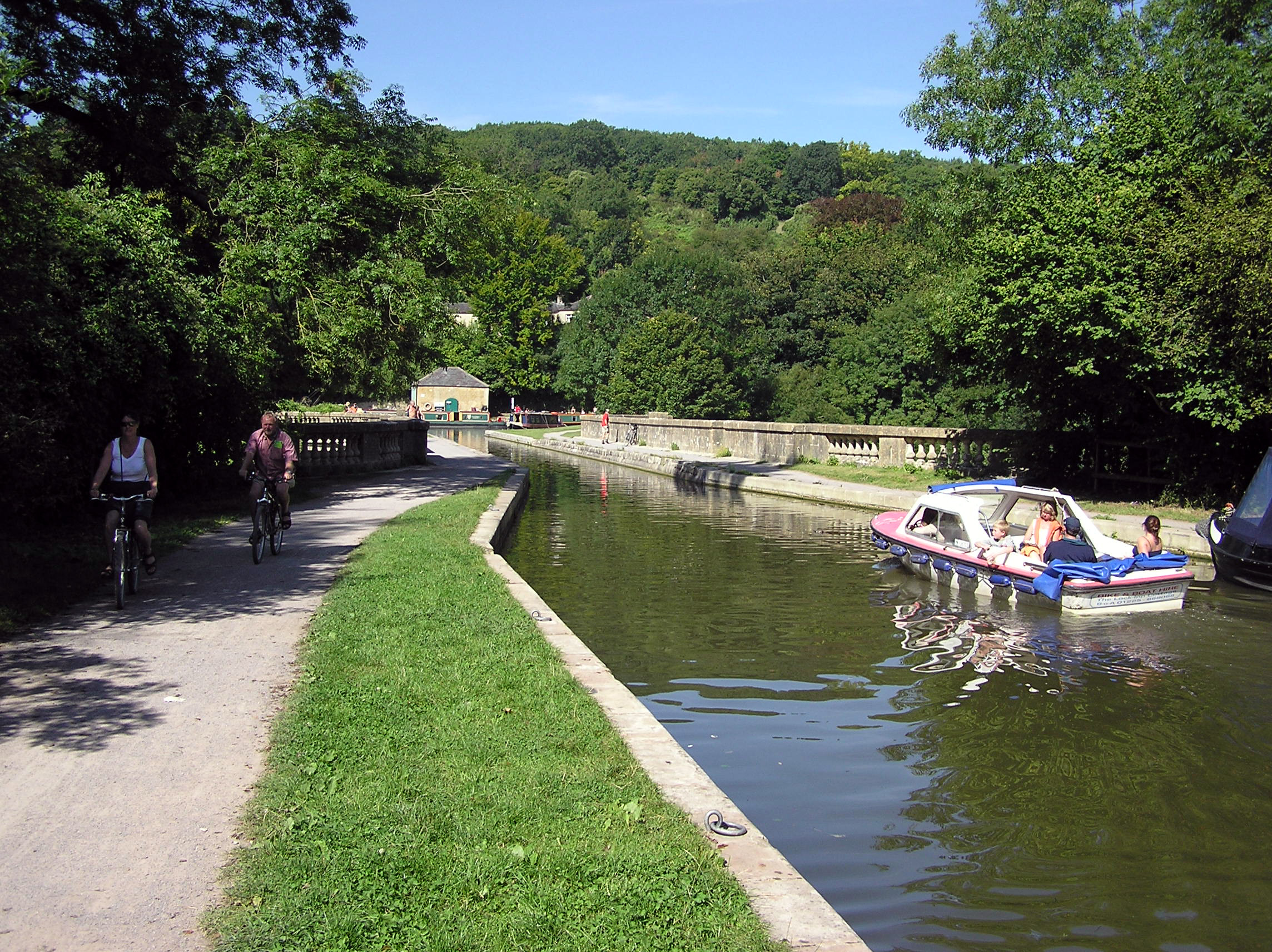
Dundas Aqueduct, built in 1805, lies between Bradford-on-Avon and Bath. Here the canal crosses high above the River Avon and the railway line (the narrowing is the aqueduct).

The canal then crosses over the river and the Wessex Main Line railway at the Dundas Aqueduct, past Conkwell Wood, before recrossing the river and railway at the Avoncliff Aqueduct. At the western end of the Dundas Aqueduct it is joined by the remains of the Somerset Coal Canal, a short stretch of which has been restored to create the Brassknocker Basin. Excavations of the old stop lock showed that it was originally a broad 14-foot (4.3 m) lock that at some point was narrowed to 7 feet (2.1 m) by moving the lock wall. The Somerset Coal Canal was built around 1800 from basins at Paulton and Timsbury, giving access to London from the Somerset Coalfield, which at its peak contained 80 collieries.

After the Avoncliff Aqueduct the canal passes through Barton Farm Country Park, past Gripwood Quarry and a 14th-century Grade II* listed tithe barn, 180 feet (55 m) long and 30 feet (9 m) wide, on its way into Bradford-on-Avon. Further east, an aqueduct carries the canal over the River Biss. There are locks at Semington and Seend, where water flows into the canal from the Summerham Brook, otherwise known as the Seend Feeder. In the village of Semington the Wilts & Berks Canal joined the canal, linking the Kennet and Avon to the River Thames at Abingdon. The North Wilts Canal merged with it to become a branch to the Thames and Severn Canal at Latton near Cricklade. The 52-mile (84 km) canal was opened in 1810, but abandoned in 1914 – a fate hastened by the collapse of Stanley Aqueduct in 1901. In 1977 the Wilts & Berks Canal Amenity Group was formed with the aim of fully restoring the canal to re-connect the Kennet and Avon to the upper reaches of the Thames.

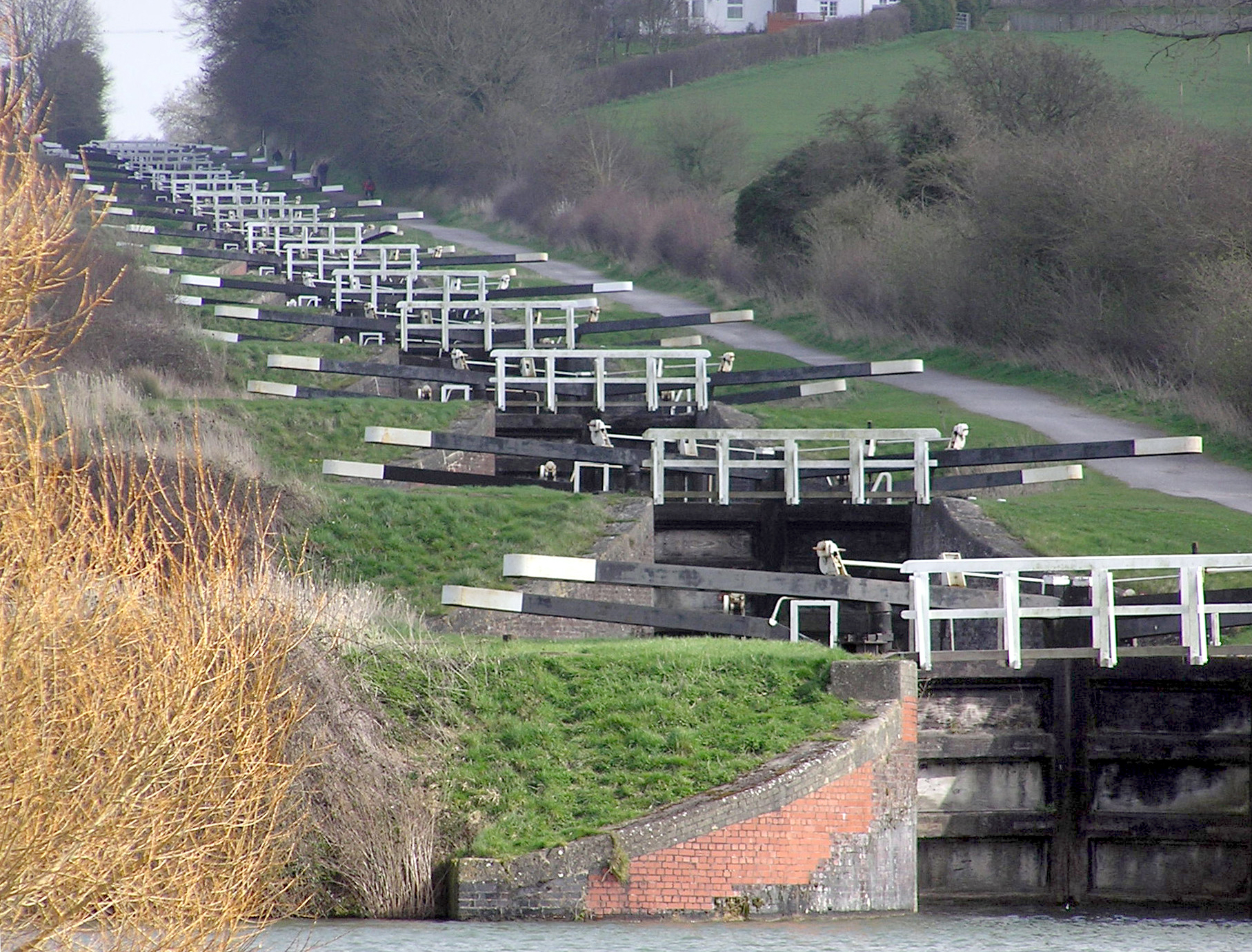
These 16 locks at Caen Hill form part of the Devizes flight of 29 locks

Caen Hill Locks, at Devizes, provides an insight into the engineering needed to build and maintain the canal. The main flight of 16 locks, which take 5–6 hours to navigate in a boat, is part of a longer series of 29 locks built in three groups: seven at Foxhangers, sixteen at Caen Hill, and six at the town end of the flight. The total rise is 237 feet (72 m) in 2 miles (3.2 km) or a 1 in 30 gradient. The locks were the last part of the 87-mile (140 km) route of the canal to be completed. The steepness of the terrain meant that there was no space to use the normal arrangement of water pounds between the locks. As a result, the 16 locks utilise unusually large side ponds to store the water needed for their operation. Because a large volume of water is needed a back pump was installed at Foxhangers in 1996, capable of returning 7 million imperial gallons (32,000 m^{3}) of water per day to the top of the flight, equivalent to one lockful every 11 minutes. From 1829 until 1843 the flight, which includes the narrowest lock on the canal, Lock 41, was illuminated by gas lights.

At the top of the flight is Devizes Wharf, home to the Kennet & Avon Canal Museum, which has a range of exhibits on the conception, design, usage, and eventual commercial decline of the Kennet and Avon Canal, as well as its subsequent restoration. It is operated by the Kennet and Avon Canal Trust, which has its headquarters and a shop within the Canal Centre. The Wharf Theatre is in an old warehouse on the same site. Devizes wharf is the starting point for the Devizes to Westminster International Canoe Marathon, which has been held since 1948.

=== Devizes to Newbury ===
Heading east from Devizes the canal passes through the Wiltshire countryside and a series of locks and swing bridges before another flight of locks at Crofton.

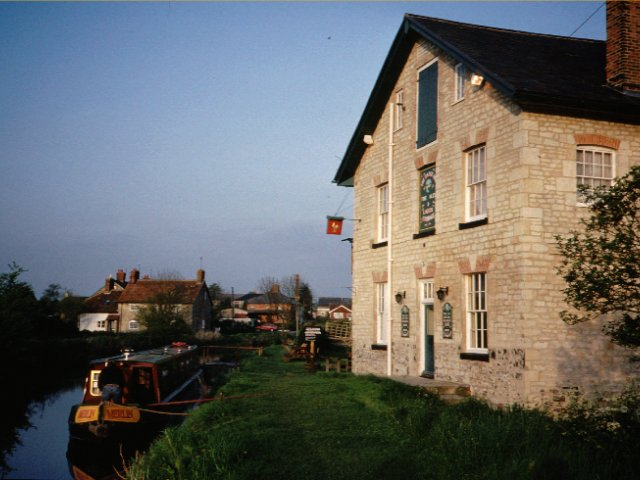
The Barge Inn, Honeystreet

At Honeystreet is the remains of a wharf that was the home of boat builders Robbins, Lane and Pinnegar, which served as the boat building headquarters of the Canal Company. They built many of the boats used on the canals of southern England before closing in about 1950. Next to the wharf is the Barge Inn, a substantial public house once known as the George Inn. It was roughly half-way along the canal and served as a bakehouse, slaughterhouse and shop for provisions for those living and working on the canal. The building was destroyed by fire in 1858 and rebuilt within six months. It was built just within the parish boundary of Stanton St Bernard to "serve the Honey Street wharf in Alton parish, which refused to allow drinking establishments".

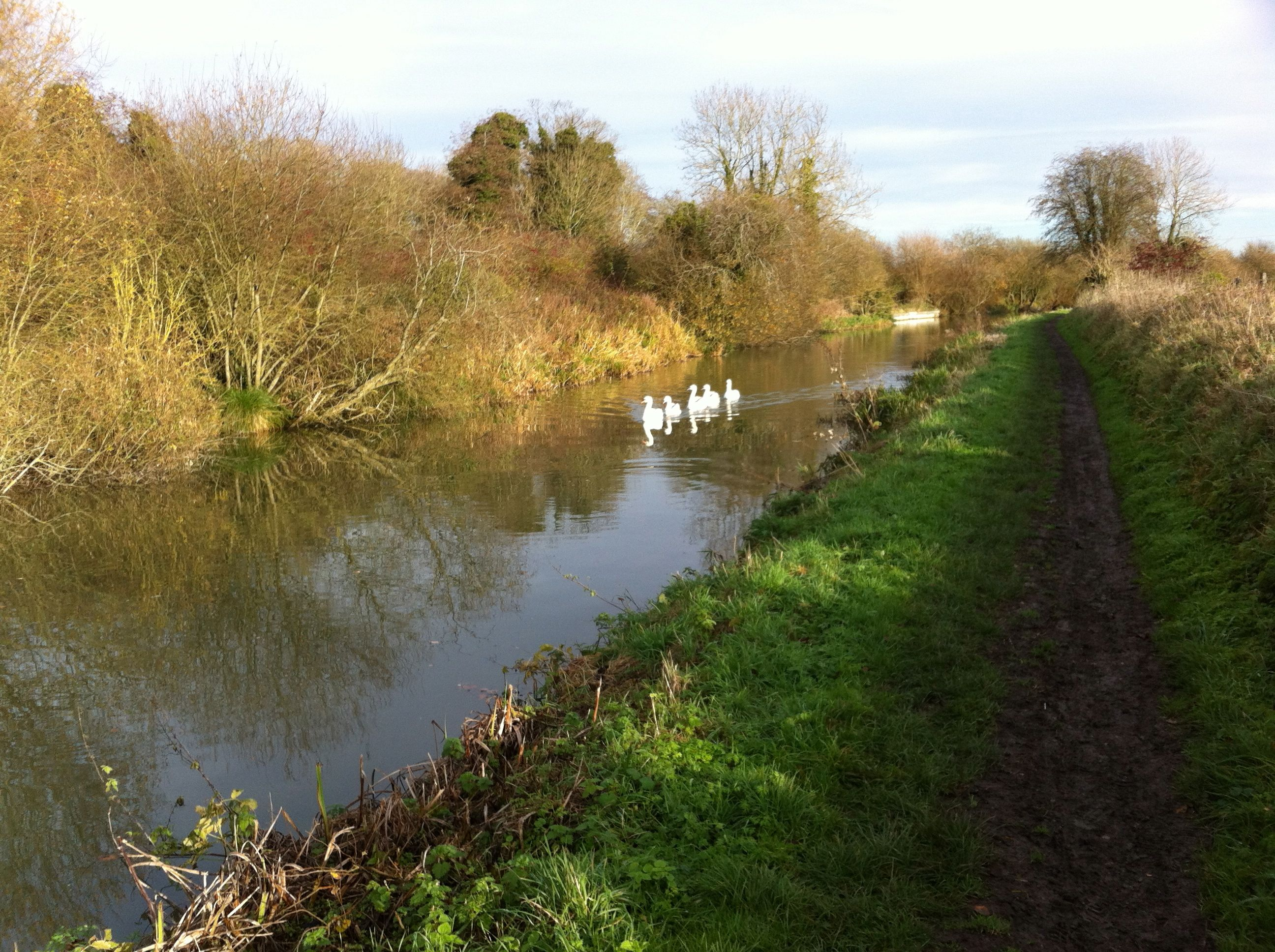
Swans coming into Devizes from the Newbury side

Jones's Mill is a 29-acre (12 ha) area of fen vegetation, scrub and woodland lying along the headwaters of the Salisbury Avon northeast of Pewsey. It has been designated a biological Site of Special Scientific Interest because it is "the best known example of a calcareous valley mire in Wiltshire".

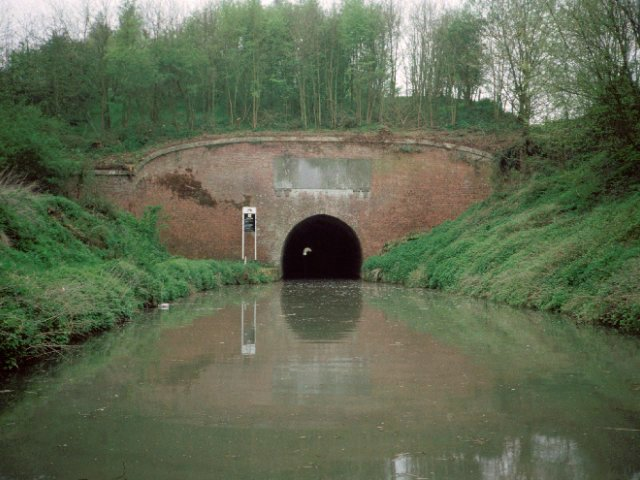
Bruce Tunnel eastern portal at the canal summit

The four locks at Wootton Rivers mark the end of the climb from the Avon. Between Wootton Top Lock and Crofton is the summit pound of the canal at 450 feet (140 m) above sea level, stretching for about 2 miles (3 km) and including the 502-yard-long (459 m) Bruce Tunnel. The tunnel is named after the local land owner, Thomas Brudenell-Bruce, 1st Earl of Ailesbury (1729–1814), who refused to allow a deep cutting through his property and insisted on a tunnel. The tunnel has red brick portals, capped with Bath stone, each with a decorative plaque of Pennant stone. The tunnel was begun in 1806 and finished in 1809. It is lined with English bond brickwork and has a wide bore to cope with the Newbury barges used on the canal. There is no towpath through the tunnel, so walkers and cyclists must walk across the top of the hill. When canal boats were pulled by horses the boatmen had to haul their barges through the tunnel by hand, pulling on chains that ran along the inside walls. The Berks & Hants Extension Railway subsequently built Savernake Low Level railway station in a shallow cutting above the canal tunnel between 1847 and 1862, which closed in 1966, but the trackbed is still in use today.

The Crofton Locks flight marks the start of the descent from the summit to the Thames; the nine locks have a total rise/fall of 61 feet (19 m). When the canal was built there were no reliable water sources available to fill the summit by normal gravitational means. A number of usable springs were found adjacent to the canal route about one mile (1.6 km) east of the summit pound, and about 40 feet (12 m) below it, and arrangements were made for them to feed the pound below lock 60 at Crofton. Some years later the Wilton Water reservoir was created to enhance the supply to this pound using the springs and the River Dun.

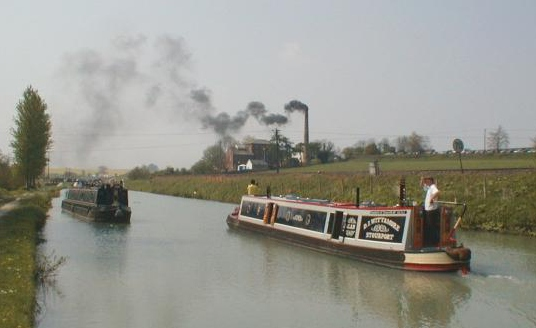
Crofton Pumping Station from canal

Water is pumped to the summit at the western end of the locks, from Wilton Water, by the restored Crofton Pumping Station. The original steam-powered pumping station is preserved and contains one of the oldest operational Watt-style beam engines in the world, dating from 1812. The steam engines still pump water on selected weekends, but for day-to-day operation electric pumps are used, automatically controlled by the water level in the summit pound.

Near Crofton is Savernake Forest and the remains of a railway bridge that carried the Midland and South Western Junction Railway over the canal. Mill Bridge at Great Bedwyn is unusual in being a skew arch; on its completion in 1796 it was the first of its kind. From there to Hungerford the canal follows the valley of the River Dun through Freeman's Marsh, which consists of unimproved meadows, marsh and reedbed. It is an important site for overwintering, migratory and breeding birds, and supports many varieties of flora scarce in Southern England. It was cited by English Nature in 1986, and forms part of the North Wessex Downs Area of Outstanding Natural Beauty. There are plans to construct a marina and hotel complex adjacent to the site, but the potential environmental impacts (particularly to water voles) of such a development on Freeman's Marsh have led to local opposition. To the north of the canal are seven separate small areas, four in the Kennet Valley and three in the Lambourn Valley, which make up the Kennet and Lambourn Floodplain SSSI. Occupying a total of 57 acres (23 ha), it supports particularly large populations of Desmoulin's whorl snail.

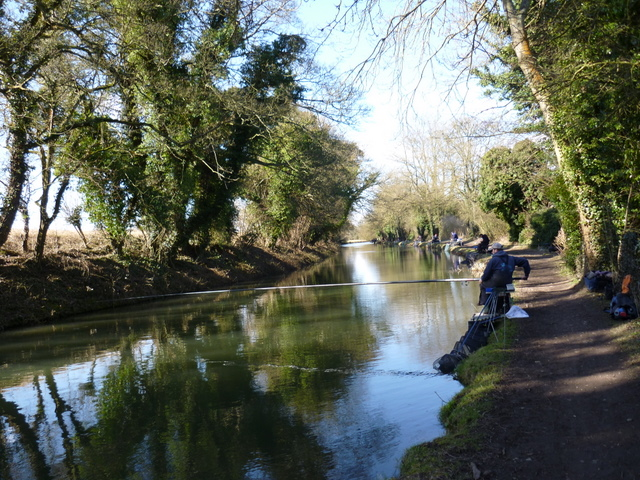
The canal passing through "The Wilderness"

There are several locks and bridges in Hungerford, including one which carries the A338. Hungerford Marsh Lock is unique on the Kennet and Avon Canal in that it has a swing bridge directly over the centre of the lock that must be opened before the lock may be used. In the area around the lock, called Hungerford Marsh Nature Reserve, more than 120 bird species have been recorded.

Between Kintbury Lock and Newbury, passing to the north of Hamstead Marshall, the canal is very close to the River Kennet, which flows into the canal via several channels. The canal passes through an area known as the Kennet Valley Alderwoods, the largest remaining fragments of damp, ash-alder woodland in the River Kennet floodplain. The SSSI includes two woods – the Wilderness and part of Ryott's Plantation – which are important because they support a very great diversity of plants associated with this woodland type, dominated by alder (Alnus glutinosa); though ash is abundant in places and there is occasional oak and wych elm. In addition to the wide range of higher plants the woods support a diverse bryophyte flora including the uncommon epiphytes Radula complanata, Zygodon viridissimus and Orthotrichum affine. Nearby is Irish Hill Copse. This site of coppiced ancient woodland includes an extensive area of calcareous ash/wych elm coppice on the hill sides, merging into wet ash/maple and acid oak/ash/hazel woodland with aspen, on the higher parts of the site. The lower slopes are dominated by dog's mercury, with abundant herb paris, toothwort, Solomon's seal, common twayblade and early-purple orchids and, locally, wild daffodil.

A wooden bridge was built over the Kennet at Newbury in 1726, replaced in stone between 1769 and 1772 by James Clarke, and now known as the Town Bridge or Water Bridge. As there is no tow path, a line to haul the barge had to be floated under the bridge and then re-attached to the horse where the tow path resumed.

=== Newbury to Reading ===
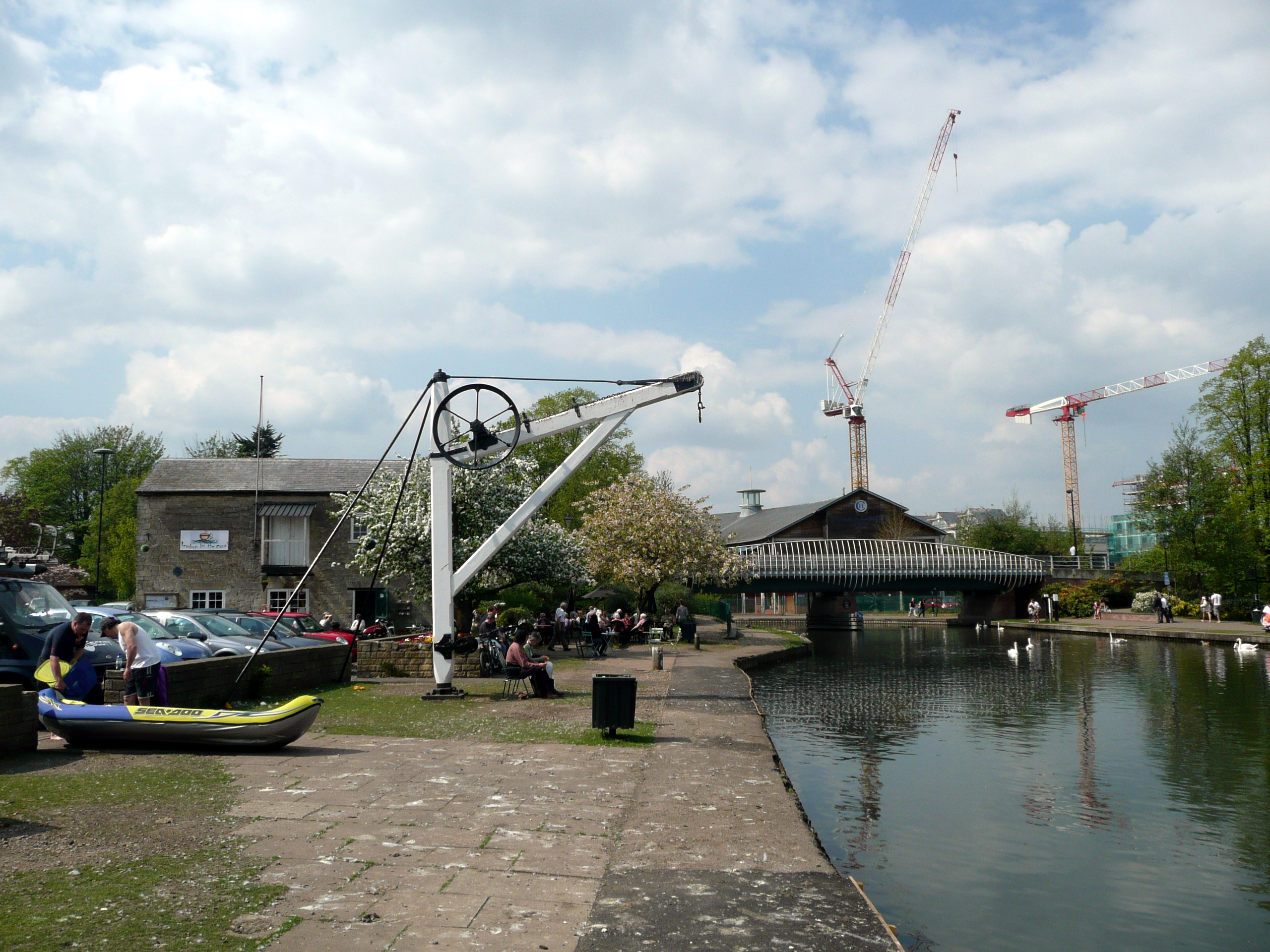
Newbury Wharf

The River Kennet is navigable from Newbury downstream to the confluence with the River Thames at Kennet Mouth, in Reading.

The stretch from Newbury to High Bridge in Reading is an improved river navigation known as the Kennet Navigation, opened in 1723. Throughout this navigation stretches of natural riverbed alternate with 11 miles (18 km) of artificial lock cuts and a series of locks that overcome a fall of 130 feet (40 m).

East of Newbury town centre the Kennet passes through the Thatcham Reed Beds a 169-acre (68 ha) Site of Special Scientific Interest, nationally important for its extensive reedbed, and species-rich alder woodland and fen habitats. The latter supports Desmoulin's whorl snail (Vertigo moulinsiana), which is of national and European importance. A large assemblage of breeding birds such as Cetti's warbler make use of the reedbed, fen and open water habitats found at Thatcham Reed Beds. Thatcham's network of gravel pits, reed bed, woodland, hedges and grassland is rich in wildlife and has been made into The Nature Discovery Centre by the Royal Society for the Protection of Birds.

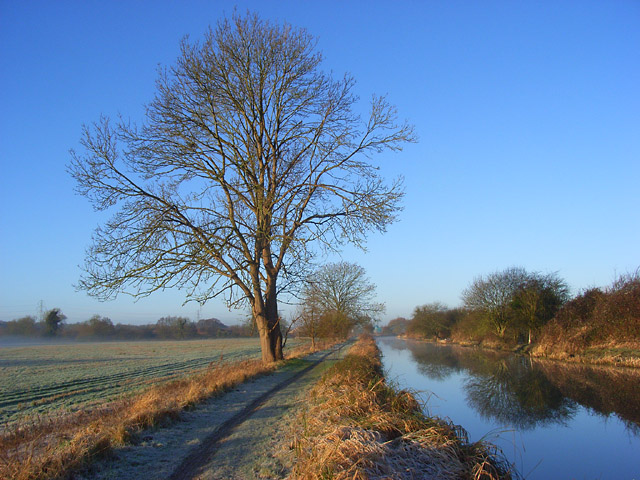
The Kennet Navigation between Midgham and Colthrop locks

Monkey Marsh Lock at Thatcham is one of only two remaining working examples of turf-sided locks on the canal today. It is listed as a scheduled monument by English Heritage.

Below Colthrop Lock in Thatcham the river leaves behind the built-up area of Newbury and runs in generally rural surroundings. It passes through the Woolhampton Reed Bed, another SSSI which consists of dense reed bed with smaller areas of tall fen vegetation and carr woodland. It is notable for the diversity of insects it supports and its nesting passerine bird populations, which include several uncommon species such as reed warbler, a species that in Britain nests almost exclusively in this habitat.

Aldermaston Gravel Pits consist of mature flooded gravel workings surrounded by dense fringing vegetation, trees and scrub, affording a variety of habitats for breeding birds and a refuge for wildfowl. The irregular shoreline with islands, promontories, sheltered eutrophic pools and narrow lagoons, provides undisturbed habitat for many water birds, including surface-feeding ducks such as teal and shoveler. The surrounding marsh and scrub are important for numerous birds including nine breeding species of warblers, water rails, kingfishers and an important breeding colony of nightingales. In 2002 English Nature bought Aldermaston Gravel Pits from the mineral extraction company Grundon and it is managed as a nature reserve by the Berkshire, Buckinghamshire and Oxfordshire Wildlife Trust. The River Kennet itself, from near its sources west of Marlborough down to Woolhampton, has been designated as a SSSI primarily because it has an extensive range of rare plants and animals that are unique to chalk watercourses.

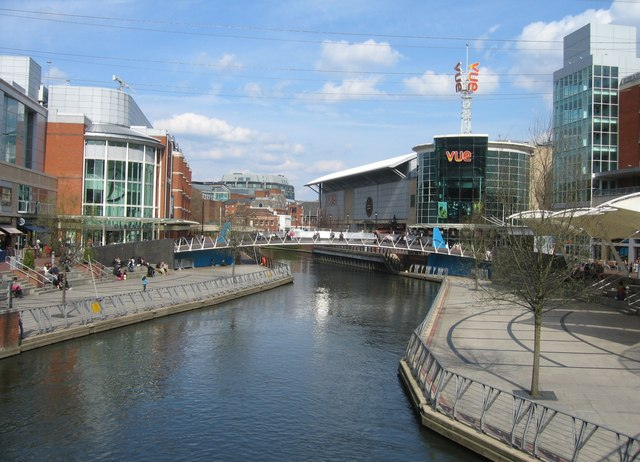
Brewery Gut within The Oracle

The village of Woolhampton and the canal settlement of Aldermaston Wharf are the only significant settlements until the river enters the built-up area of Reading at Sheffield Lock in Theale. Even after this, the river is isolated from Reading's suburbs by a wide floodplain surrounding the river. In this stretch is Garston Lock, the other turf-sided lock on the navigation.

Shortly after passing Fobney Lock and the associated water treatment works, the Kennet flood plain narrows and the river enters a narrow steep-sided gap in the hills forming the southern flank of the Thames flood plain. At County Lock the river enters the centre of Reading, where it formerly flowed through the centre of a large brewery. This narrow and twisting stretch of the river became known as Brewery Gut. Because of poor visibility and the difficulty of boats passing in this stretch, traffic has long been controlled by a set of maritime traffic lights. Today the Brewery Gut is a major feature of Reading's The Oracle shopping centre.

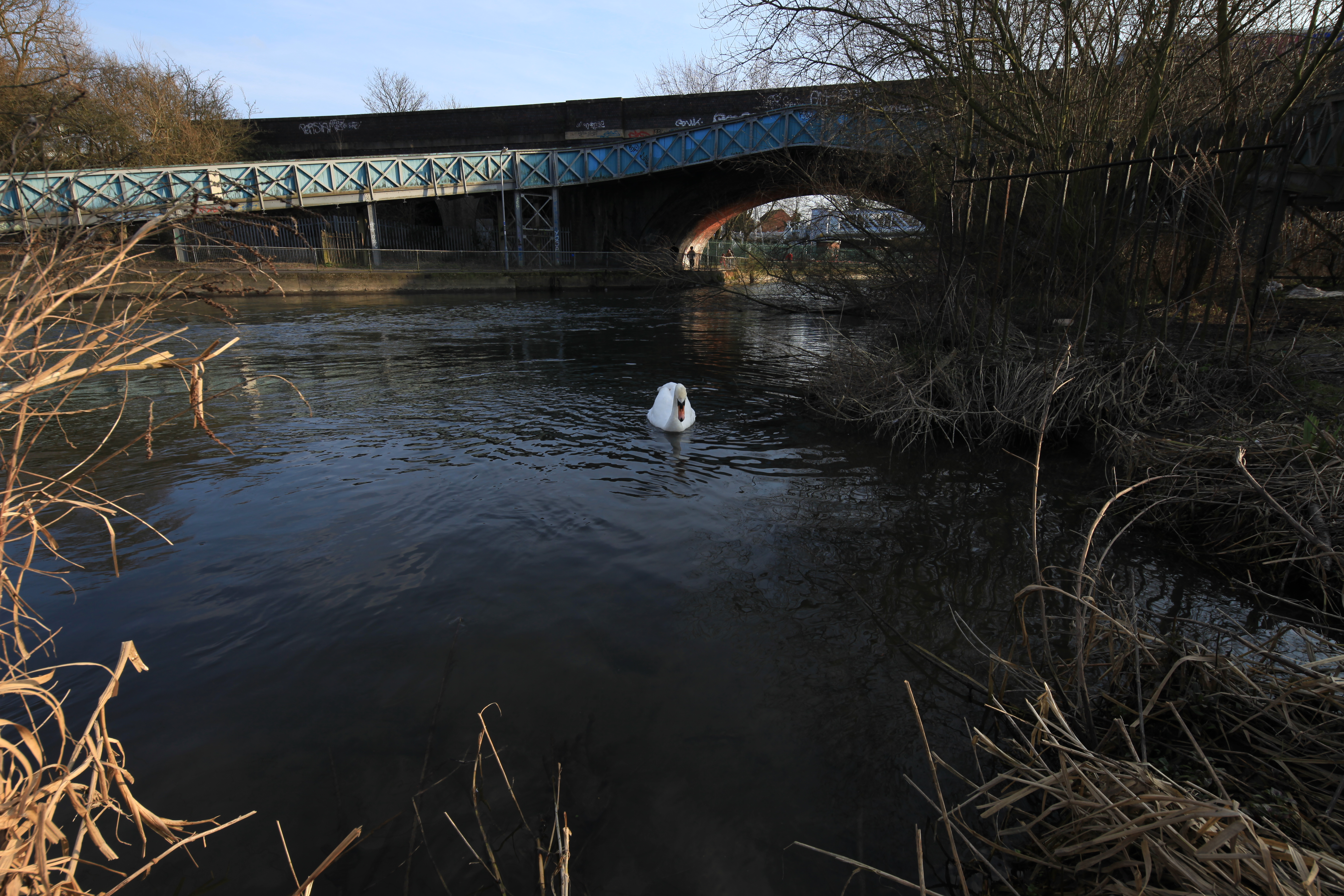
Kennet Mouth with bridge of the Great Western Main Line where the River Kennet meets the River Thames

Immediately after The Oracle the river flows under the arched High Bridge, which forms a historical and administrative divide on the river. The last one mile (1.6 km) of the River Kennet in Reading below the bridge has been navigable since at least the 13th century. Because there is no wide floodplain, wharves could be built during the Middle Ages that allowed Reading to establish itself as a river port. Originally this short stretch of river, which includes Blake's Lock, was under the control of Reading Abbey, but today it is administered by the Environment Agency as if it were part of the River Thames. The Horseshoe Bridge at Kennet Mouth was built as a railway bridge in 1839, and the timber-clad iron-truss accommodation bridge was added in 1892.

== Canal today ==
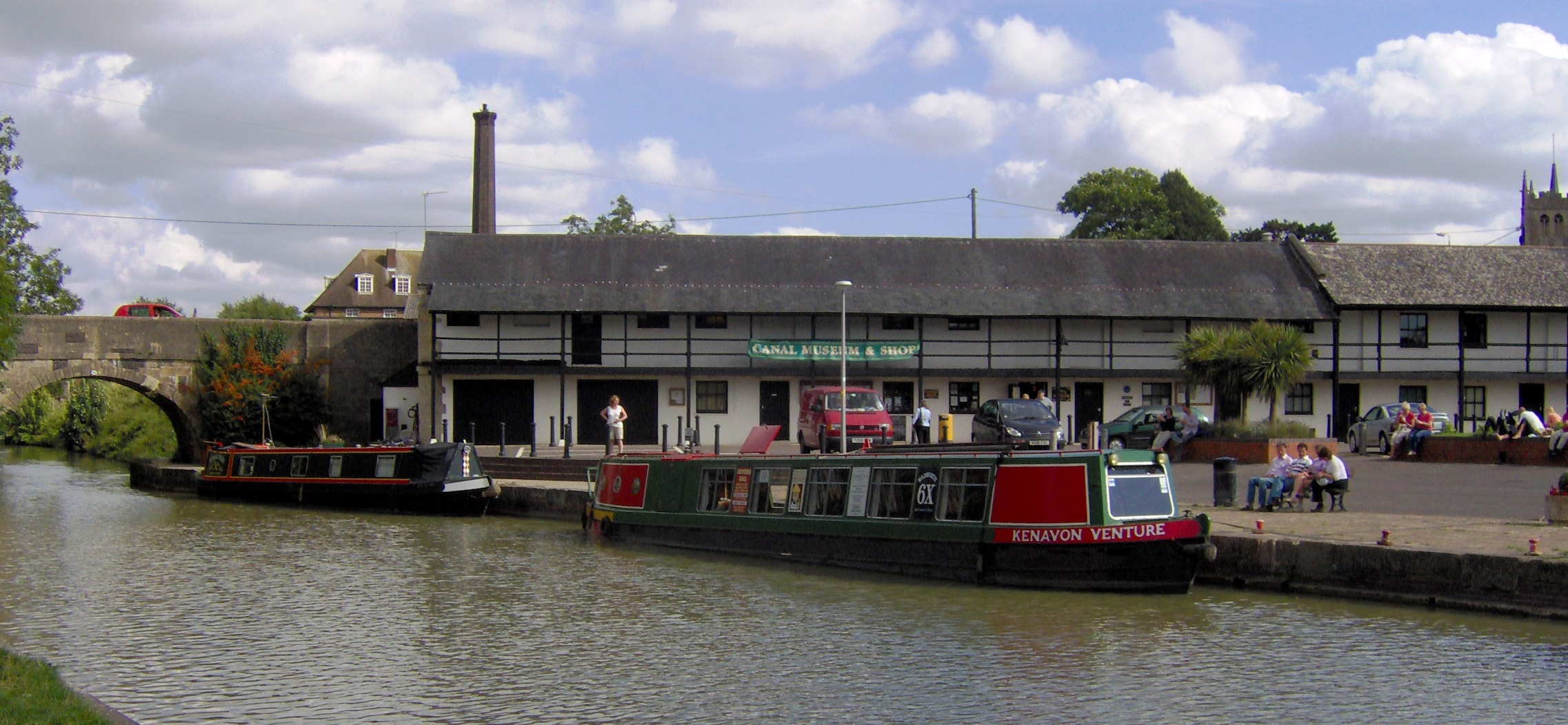
Canal Museum at Devizes Wharf

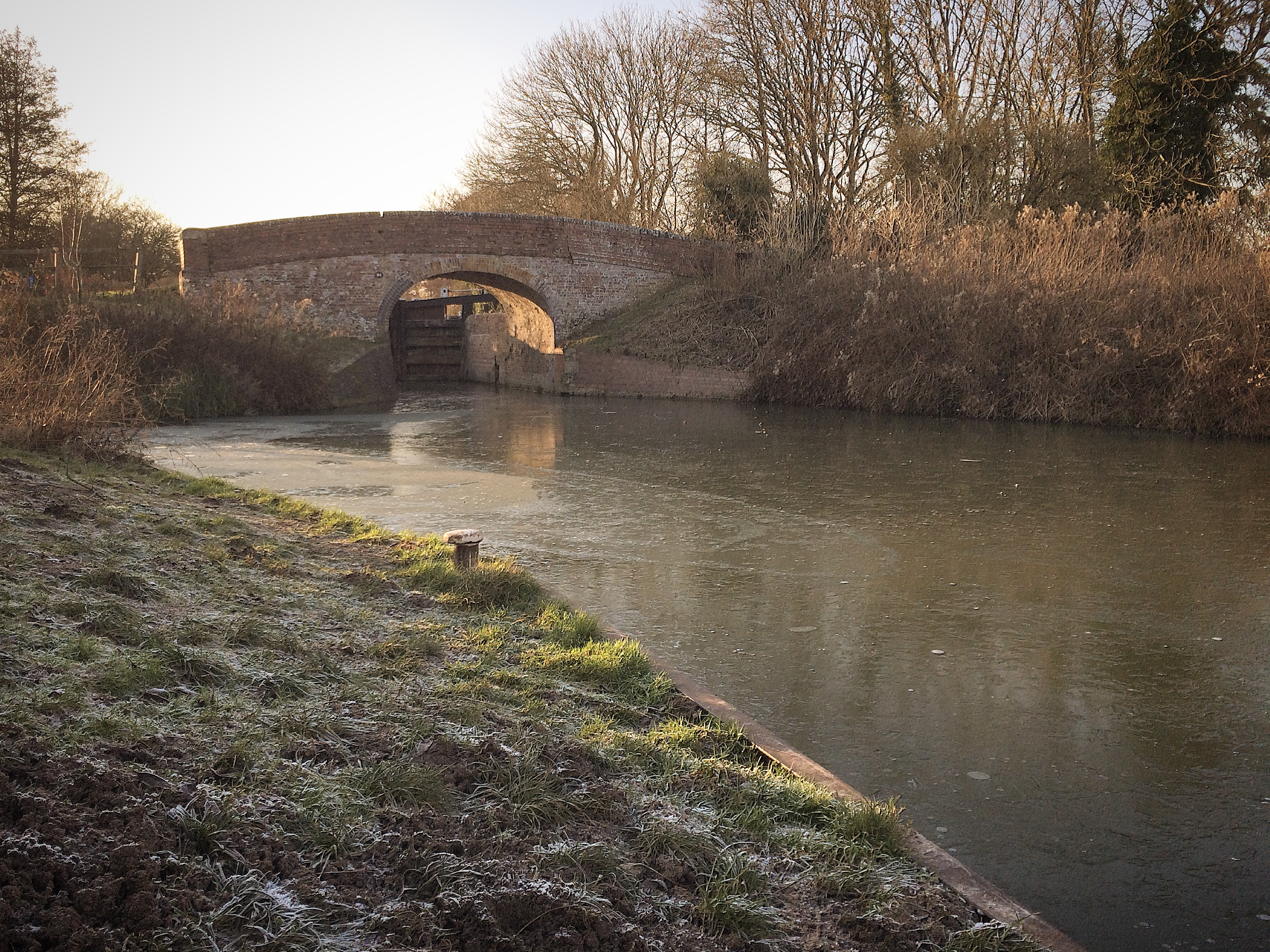
Guyer's Lock and bridge near Newbury

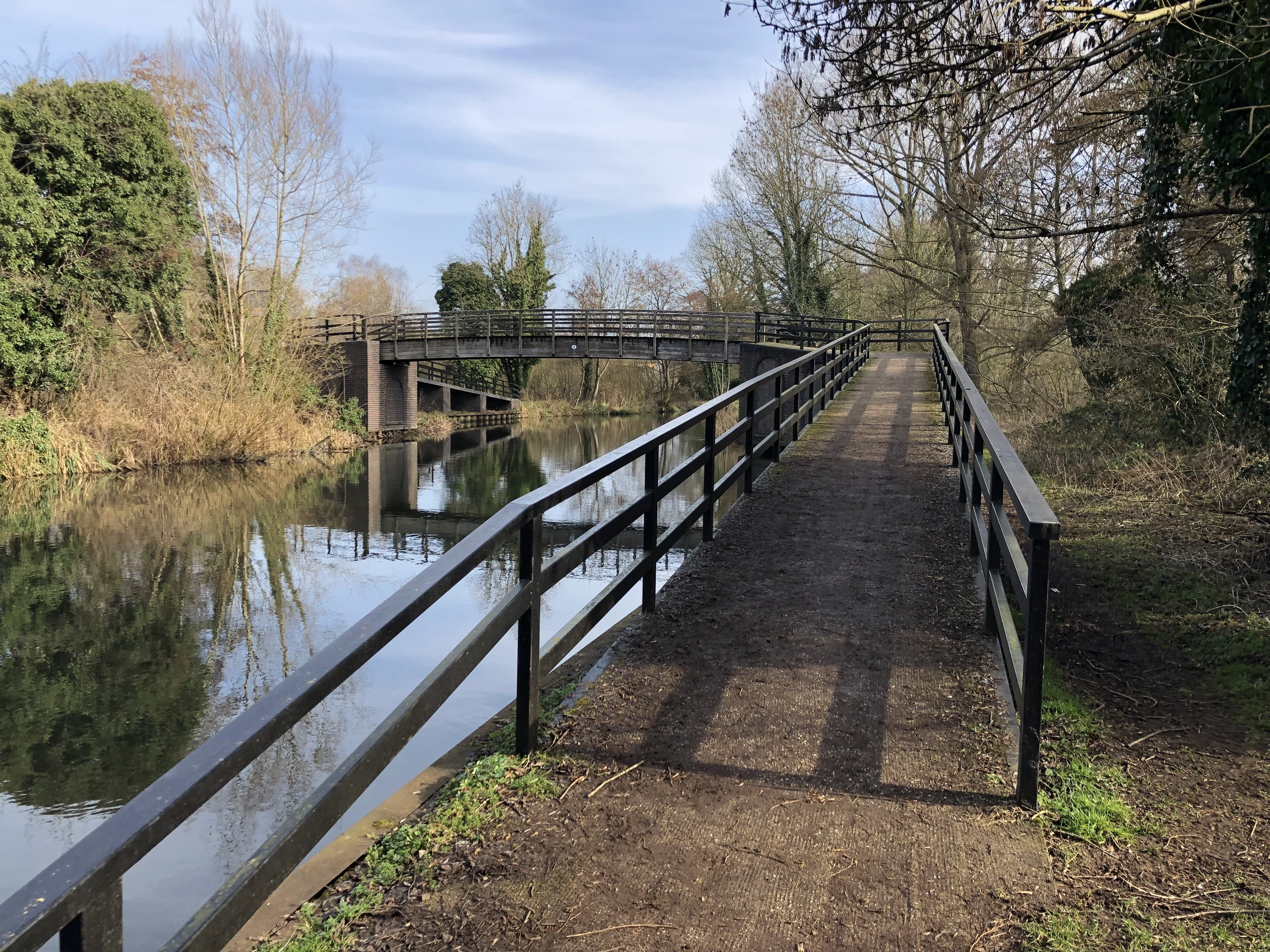
Wickham Knight Bridge near Woolhampton

The canal today is a heritage tourism destination. Boating, with narrowboats and cruisers, is a popular tourist attraction particularly in the summer months. It is a favourite haunt of several famous canal enthusiasts including canal boat veterans and original Kennet and Avon restoration supporters, Prunella Scales and Timothy West. Privately owned craft and hire boats from the range of marinas are much in evidence, and there are numerous canoe clubs along its length. The annual Devizes to Westminster International Canoe Marathon starts from Devizes Wharf, the site of the Kennet & Avon Canal Museum, at first light on Good Friday each year and the competitors have to negotiate 77 locks in the 125-mile (201 km) route between Devizes and the finish at Westminster. The winning time is usually around 17 1/2 hours.

Cycling is permitted along the towpath except for a 656-yard (600 m) section near Woolhampton, and some sections have been improved and widened to make them more suitable for cyclists and disabled users. Under a partnership arrangement involving British Waterways, Sustrans, and the riparian local authorities, two main sections of the canal have been improved, and, with a few short diversions, run from Reading to Marsh Benham and from Devizes to Bath as part of the National Cycle Network (NCN) Route 4. Fishing for bream, tench, roach, rudd, perch, gudgeon, pike and carp is permitted throughout the year from the towpath of the canal, but almost its whole length is leased to angling associations or fishing clubs. There are a variety of riverside public houses, shops and tea rooms. The Kennet and Avon Canal Trust operates shops and tearooms at Aldermaston Lock, Newbury Wharf, Crofton Pumping Station, Devizes, and Bradford-on-Avon.

=== Ecology ===
The canal and its environs are important for wildlife conservation. There are several Sites of Special Scientific Interest (SSSI), which exhibit great biodiversity. Key sites that are home to several rare species include the Aldermaston Gravel Pits, Woolhampton, Thatcham Reed Beds, and Freeman's Marsh, Hungerford. There are also many non-statutory nature reserves along the canal. More than a hundred different species of bird have been recorded in surveys over the length of the canal, of which 38 could be classified as specialist waterway birds, including grey heron, reed bunting and kingfisher. Fourteen species have been confirmed as breeding including sand martins, which nest in drain-pipes in the brick walls of the canal in the centre of Reading. Wilton Water by Crofton Locks and the Kennet Valley gravel pits provide habitats for breeding and wintering waterfowl. Several species of Odonata (dragonflies and damselflies) and other invertebrates have also been recorded. Common reed is among the plant species growing along the edges of the canal. Measures to preserve and create water vole habitat have had considerable impact on the restoration of the canal, and new "vole-friendly" techniques of bank protection have been developed.

== See also ==
- List of locks on the Kennet and Avon Canal
- Waterways in the United Kingdom

== Bibliography ==
- Allsop, Niall (1987). The Kennet & Avon Canal. Bath, UK: Millstream Books. ISBN 978-0-948975-15-8.
- Clew, Kenneth R. (1970). The Somersetshire Coal Canal and Railways. Newton Abbot, UK: David & Charles. ISBN 978-0-7153-4792-8.
- Clew, Kenneth R. (1985). The Kennet & Avon Canal. Newton Abbot, UK: David & Charles. ISBN 0-7153-8656-5.
- Cragg, Roger (1997). Civil Engineering Heritage: Wales and West Central England. London, UK: Thomas Telford. ISBN 978-0-7277-2576-9.
- Green, Ian (2000). Myles, Sarah (ed.). The Flora of the Bristol Region. Wildlife of the Bristol Region. Newbury, UK: Pisces Publications. ISBN 978-1-874357-18-6.
- Hackford, Clive (2001). The Kennet & Avon Canal. Stroud, UK: Tempus. ISBN 978-0-7524-2129-2.
- Hadfield, Charles (1967). The Canals of South West England. Newton Abbot, UK: David & Charles.
- Halse, Roger; Castens, Simon (2000). The Somersetshire Coal Canal: A Pictorial Journey. Bath, UK: Millstream Books. ISBN 978-0-948975-58-5.
- Haslam, Sylvia Mary (1987). River plants of western Europe: the macrophytic vegetation of watercourses of the European Economic Community. Cambridge, UK: CUP archive. ISBN 978-0-521-26427-3.
- Lindley-Jones, Peter (2002). Restoring the Kennet & Avon Canal. Stroud, UK: Tempus. ISBN 978-0-7524-2387-6.
- Nicholson (2006). Nicholson Guides Vol 7:River Thames and the Southern Waterways. London, UK: Collins. ISBN 978-0-00-721115-9.
- Pearson, Michael (2003). Kennet & Avon Middle Thames:Pearson's Canal Companion. Rugby, UK: Central Waterways Supplies. ISBN 0-907864-97-X.
- Russell, John (1997). The Kennet & Avon Canal: A journey from Newbury to Bath in 1964. Bath, UK: Millstream Books. ISBN 978-0-948975-46-2.
- Thomas, Rod (2008). A Sacred landscape: The prehistory of Bathampton Down. Bath, UK: Millstream Books. ISBN 978-0-948975-86-8.
- Vile, Nigel (1991). Exploring the Kennet & Avon Canal. Newbury, UK: Countryside Books. ISBN 978-1-85306-124-0.
- Youe, Michael; Tate, John (1998). "British Waterways: a study in the search for sustainability". Sustainable Development. 6 (2). John Wiley & Sons, Ltd: 68–77. doi:10.1002/(SICI)1099-1719(199808)6:2<68::AID-SD86>3.0.CO;2-D.
