= Devizes to Westminster International Canoe Marathon =

Marathon canoe race in England

A junior doubles boat starting at Devizes Wharf

The Devizes to Westminster International Canoe Marathon is a marathon canoe race in England. The race is held every Easter over a course of 125 miles (201 km) from Devizes in Wiltshire to Westminster in central London. It has been run since 1948. Starting at Devizes wharf, the route follows the Kennet and Avon canal for 54 miles to Reading, where it joins the Thames. Another 54 miles later it reaches Teddington Lock, ending 17 miles later at Westminster Bridge.

Personalities to own a DW medal include former leader of the Liberal Democrats, Paddy Ashdown; explorer Sir Ranulph Fiennes; TV presenter Steve Backshall; Olympic gold medallist rowers James Cracknell and Helen Glover; adventurer Sarah Outen; and the first British woman to climb Everest, Rebecca Stephens.

== Route ==
The race follows the Kennet and Avon Canal for 52 miles (84 km) from Devizes through Pewsey, Hungerford and Newbury to Reading. From Reading the race follows the non-tidal River Thames downstream for 55 miles (89 km) through Henley-on-Thames, Marlow, Maidenhead, Windsor, Staines and Kingston before reaching the tidal River Thames at Teddington Lock. The tidal river is followed for the final 18 miles (29 km) through the western suburbs of London to Westminster. The 2008 race was the 60th anniversary of the event.

The course requires competitors to portage their canoes and kayaks around 77 locks. Starting from Devizes, there are four locks before the 502-yard (459 m) Bruce tunnel, and another 31 locks before Newbury wharf, and the end of the first stage, is reached. Stage 2 has 22 locks on the Kennet and Avon Canal, before the junction with the River Thames is reached, and a further six locks on the Thames, before the stage ends above Marlow lock. Stage 3 includes 14 locks, ending below Teddington lock, while stage 4 has a single lock at Richmond before the final 18 miles (29 km) on the tideway. Richmond lock is only operational at some states of the tide, and so a portage may be avoided if passage is made during a period of two hours either side of high tide.

== History ==
The idea of canoeing from Devizes to Westminster was first suggested by Roy Cooke, who had been part of a team who had attempted to canoe along the River Avon from Pewsey, near Devizes, to the sea at Christchurch in 1947. He then planned to see if it was possible to reach Westminster from Devizes in under 100 hours. At the time, much of the Kennet and Avon Canal was derelict, but still in water. He was unable to attempt the course, but a number of locals offered some money for Scout funds if the Devizes Scouts could succeed in "taking a boat from Devizes to Westminster in under 100 hours, all food and camping kit to be carried in the boats". Four of the scouts, Peter Brown, Laurie Jones, Brian Smith and Brian Walters, all aged 17, attempted the route at Easter 1948. The event generated much interest, with some national press coverage, and a large crowd gathering at Westminster Bridge to see the end of the feat, which was completed in 89 hours 50 minutes.

Chippenham Sea Cadets attempted the route at Whitsun 1948, and managed to reduce the time to 75 hours 50 minutes, but several attempts later in the year were thwarted by the amount of weed in the canal. In 1949, although no race had been organised, nearly 20 boats attempted the course at Easter, and although many failed to complete it, two crews representing Richmond Canoe Club completed it in 49 hours 32 minutes, and a team from Bristol Scouts managed 53 hours 10 minutes.

In view of the interest shown, Frank Luzmore, one of the competitors from Richmond Canoe Club, decided to organise the event as an annual contest. Albert Weibel, another member of the Richmond Canoe Club, donated a trophy for the winner, and at Easter 1950, 17 boats took part in the first official race. A team from Richmond Canoe Club won again, by completing the course non-stop in 34 hours 52 minutes, closely followed by a team representing the Royal Marines. Ten of the boats completed the course.

The armed forces saw the race as an opportunity for training, and because they organised the backup support as a military exercise, won the race from 1951 until 1970, with the exception of 1952. Teams from the Paras, Royal Marines, SAS and Special Forces competed, with Dansie and Dry, representing the SAS, completing the course in just over 24 hours in 1951. Officially, every boat had to carry cooking equipment, camping equipment and a host of other standard items, and no assistance from a support team was allowed. Even water could only be obtained from official watering points.

As the main race soon became a one-day event, rather than a four-day one, much of the official kit was redundant, and there was widespread breaking of the rules. In 1966, one of the crews who finished the race was disqualified, two crews had time penalties added to the time they actually took, and 49 of the crews who failed to finish were deemed to have broken the rules, and so would have been disqualified if they had finished. The military teams, with their radio networks, were particularly good at offering support, in particular food, to their teams at remote locations, where they were unlikely to be seen by race officials.

Recognising that the military had an unfair advantage, the rules were changed in 1971, so that boats did not have to carry "all food and camping kit", and the use of support teams to supply food and drink was allowed. Peter Lawler and Chris Baker, both from Richmond Canoe Club, and who had canoed for Britain at international level, took up the challenge, and succeeded in beating Paganelli and Evans, who had won the race for the Paras in 1968, 1969 and 1970.

=== Junior and Ladies Classes ===
The original rules published in 1950 states "The Cup may be competed for by any canoeing team without restriction of age, its members must be normally resident in the British Isles." The first crews to complete the course and begin the event were in fact all Juniors. The stage race, started in 1953 was introduced by the first more formal organisation to prevent Junior crews attempting to complete the course non-stop.

Junior teams were originally banned from the race on safety grounds, but the pressure to allow them to compete resulted in the introduction of stages in 1953, originally two, but soon changed to three, with compulsory overnight stops at Newbury, Marlow and Ham, just below Teddington lock. There were two crews in the junior category in 1953, but this had risen to over 50 by 1961, and in 1970 there were 100 junior crews. Numbers after that gradually declined, but a schools trophy was set up in 1975, and school teams now account for most of the junior entries.

Women were barred from the race at first, and it was not until 1971 that Sheila Burnett from Cambridge Canoe Club finished the race with Colin Dickens, only to be disqualified when it was discovered that she was a woman. In 1973, Anne-Marie Evans entered the race under a false name, in partnership with Jonathan Hutt, and was awarded a certificate for finishing, but the official policy was still that women should not enter the race. Even upon awarding them a certificate, the committee stated: "There is not and will not be a women's class, since the committee will not encourage women to enter".

By the late 1970s attitudes had changed. The first all-woman crew of Jo Saxby and Maurene Hossack entered unofficially in 1975. Trophies for ladies and mixed doubles classes were introduced in 1980. In 1995, Danielle Sellwood and Sandra Troop set the women's record at 18 hours 47 minutes, and in 1997 Danielle Sellwood was placed third overall, becoming the first woman to hold the civilian trophy. A class for junior ladies was introduced in 1976, and a junior mixed doubles class in 1981.

=== Other race developments ===
Concerned for the safety of paddlers attempting to run DW non-stop in singles (some successfully, including one by a Hungarian in a racing C1), the committee introduced a singles event in 1986 using the same stage format as the junior race. This event has proved especially popular with foreign competitors as knowledge of the course is not so vital.

A junior / veteran class was introduced in 1989, with the intention of giving parents an opportunity to paddle with their children.

An initiative to the race in the 1980s, introduced by the chairman of the committee Peter Begent, was the formal encouragement of competitors to raise money for charities by being sponsored to complete the race. Now, every year many thousands of pounds are raised by paddlers for numerous charities, and the Pfeiffer Trophy is awarded to the crew raising the largest amount of money.

In 2002, the Endeavour Class was introduced to allow older paddlers who may have participated in the DW earlier in their lives, and also inexperienced beginners, to join DW as a 4-day tour of the course without the stress of racing. This non-competitive class is also free from the restriction of overnight camping within 200 metres of the course, allowing the use of hotel and B&B accommodation.

The 1000 Mile Club was introduced in 2011, an honour recognising the achievements of those who had completed the race eight times.

== Classes ==
There are five classes of event, each with its own set of rules.

- Senior Doubles: This is a non-stop race, timed continuously from the moment they start, until either they reach Westminster, or they admit defeat (which accounts for one third of the entries, rising to half in 1998).
- Junior Doubles: Two crew members, completing the course in four stages with overnight stops.
- Junior/Veteran: Two crew members, one who must be a junior, and one who must be over 35, completing the course in four stages with overnight stops. This class was introduced in 1989 to encourage parents to canoe with their children, but most crews which have entered are not related.
- Senior Singles: One person kayaks or canoes, over the same four stages.
- Endeavour: A doubles class held over four stages which is non-competitive.

The stages in the Stages race are as follows:

Stage 1: Devizes Wharf to Northcroft Leisure Centre, Newbury (34.4 miles)
Stage 2: Northcroft Leisure Centre, Newbury to Marlow (35.6 miles)
Stage 3: Marlow to Thames Young Mariners, Teddington (37.5 miles)
Stage 4: Thames Young Mariners, Teddington to Westminster Bridge (17.5 miles)

== Cancellations and abandoned races ==
In 2000, heavy rainfall had brought the River Thames up to flood levels with fast-flowing water. A number of crews found the conditions on the Thames challenging, especially during the darkness of night-time for the non-stop crews. After an incident at Old Windsor weir, the race committee took the decision to abandon the race. As some teams had already reached Teddington (and were waiting to access the tidal stretch) when the decision was made, they decided (against the race organisers' instructions) to remove their race numbers and carry on unofficially to Westminster.

In 2001, along with a large number of events in the UK, the race could not take place due to a nationwide outbreak of foot-and-mouth disease restricting unnecessary access to the countryside (and thus large parts of the course).

In 2016, Storm Katie brought storm force winds to London on Easter Monday and a decision was made to cancel the last day of the staged race; the results were based on the times taken to reach Thames Young Mariners. Finishers' medals were awarded to those that reached this point and certificates issued marked "shortened course". This decision did not affect the non-stop race, which had already finished on Easter Sunday.

In 2018, heavy rainfall prior to the Easter weekend and throughout Good Friday again brought the River Thames up to flood levels with fast-flowing water. The race committee initially ruled that no night-time paddling should occur on the Thames, but after conditions worsened they decided that all classes would finish at Reading (Wokingham Canoe Club at Dreadnought Reach). No finishers' medals were issued and certificates were marked "shortened course".

In 2020 and 2021, the event was cancelled because of the COVID-19 pandemic.

In 2022, the event was shortened to 108 miles and finished at Teddington, since the grounds of St Thomas' Hospital were occupied by a vaccination station.

In 2023, race entries were curtailed due to extremely high water levels. Many crews were disallowed from the start, based on ability, to let organisers focus health and safety efforts on crews who were more likely to be water-competent. Thus, no crew with a junior was allowed to go past Dreadnought Reach in Reading. This was also the case for Senior Singles, Junior Doubles, Junior Vet classes and any Endeavour crew containing a junior. Only Senior Doubles were allowed to finish in Westminster.

In 2024, the organisers intended to have the finish line for the Senior Doubles at its traditional Westminster site, while the Stage Races would span three days and finish at Thames Young Mariners, Ham, opposite Twickenham. These changes arose from concerns over increased powered traffic on the Thames tideway, in particular the high-speed Thames Clippers river bus. In the event, high water levels from Storm Nelson led to parts of the canal overflowing, reaching Richmond. This initiated the Port of London's Ebb Tide Red Flag warning. Therefore, the Single K1, Junior/Vet, Endeavour class, and non-stop Senior Doubles races were all terminated at Teddington, and the Junior Doubles race terminated at Dreadnought Reach in Reading. Altogether, these limitations meant no course records attempts could be made.

== Course records ==
The current (non-stop) course record was set during an unprecedented race in 2023, which saw half of the senior entrants disallowed by a competency-based assessment for safety reasons. Keith Moule of Chelmsford Canoe Club and Tom Sharpe of Richmond Canoe Club set a new record with a time of 15 hours and 19 minutes. For the previous 44 years the record stood at 15 hours 34 minutes, set in 1979 by Brian Greenham and Tim Cornish, one from Richmond Canoe Club and one from Reading Canoe Club.

For the staged events, the solo record was set in 1993 by G Butler of Nottingham Kayak Club in a time of 14 hours 46 minutes. The junior record was also set in 1993 by the Richmond / Royal pairing of Steve Jensen and Tony Richardson in 14 hours 13 minutes, faster than the senior record, but they did have three night's sleep on the way down.

== Related races ==
In the months leading up to the races, there are two series of races, the Thameside Series and Waterside Series, that are deemed good practice for crews competing in the main Devizes to Westminster race. The Thameside Series is based around Reading, with two races, going from Aldermaston to Reading and Reading to Marlow respectively. The Waterside Series is a series of four races based around Newbury, Berkshire, of lengths 14 miles, 17.5 miles, 23 miles and 34 miles; it is often competed as a series on its own.
