= Stidham =

Stidham is a surname. Notable people with the surname include:

- Arbee Stidham (1917–1988), American musician
- Ari Stidham (born 1992), American actor
- Brian Stidham (1967–2004), American murder victim
- Caleb Stidham, American politician
- Gary Stidham, American politician
- Haleigh Stidham (born 1983), American beauty queen
- Howard Stidham (born 1954), American football player
- Jarrett Stidham (born 1996), American football player
- Phil Stidham (born 1968), American former baseball player
- Thomas E. Stidham (1905–1964), American football player and coach

== See also ==
- Stidham Farm
- Stidham, Oklahoma
