= Waterside Series =

Series of four marathon canoe races

The Waterside Series is a series of four marathon canoe races held on the Kennet and Avon Canal and finishing at the Newbury Waterside Centre.

The race series is held in the Spring each year in the eight weeks leading up to Easter. They are held on Sundays at fortnightly intervals starting eight weeks before Easter, and the races are progressively longer in distance.

It is common to use the Waterside Series as a warm-up event for the longer, 125-mile Devizes to Westminster International Canoe Marathon. Despite its status as a warm-up event, it is considered a gruelling challenge in its own right.

== Races ==
- Waterside A – 13.5 miles (21 portages) from Great Bedwyn to Newbury
- Waterside B – 17.5 miles (19 portages) from Newbury to Aldermaston and back
- Waterside C – 23 miles (35 portages) from Pewsey Wharf to Newbury
- Waterside D – 35 miles (35 portages) from Devizes to Newbury

The races take place in a time trial format, whereby competitors choose their own start time within the start window and must finish within the finish window. The opening and closing times of these windows varies from race to race, with the longer races having earlier start windows and/or later finish windows.

Races C and D include the Savernake Tunnel, where overtaking is prohibited for safety reasons.

== Competitors ==
The Waterside Series attracts a range of entrants from regular marathon paddlers based at clubs around the country to endurance athletes from other sports seeking to use the races for training. The race is also popular with public schools and the military. Races A and B, and in particular A are used as training events for Great Britain team paddlers.

== Classes ==
There are 12 classes where prizes are awarded for the individual races and for the series overall:

- Senior K2 – Open to any kayak doubles.
- Senior K1 – Open to any kayak singles.
- Junior K2 – Open to any kayak doubles where both competitors are under the age of 19 on 1 January of the year of the race.
- Junior K1 – Open to any kayak singles under the age of 19 on 1 January on the year of the race.
- Ladies K2 – Open to any female kayak doubles.
- Ladies K1 – Open to any female kayak singles.
- Mixed K2 – Open to kayak doubles with one male and one female competitor.
- Veteran K2 – Open to any kayak doubles where both competitors are over the age of 35 on 1 January of the year of the race.
- Veteran K1 – Open to any kayak singles over the age of 35 on 1 January on the year of the race.
- Junior/Veteran K2 – Open to kayak doubles with one competitor over the age of 35 and one competitor under the age of 19 on 1 January of the year of the race.
- C2 – Open to any canoe doubles regardless of age or gender, this may either be a touring canoe or sprint canoe.
- C1 – Open to any canoe singles regardless of age or gender, like the C2 class, this may either be a touring canoe or sprint canoe.

In addition, at the end of the series team prizes are awarded to the fastest teams composed of Juniors, Seniors or members of a uniformed service. Prizes are also awarded for the fasted junior competitors in the Ladies K2, Mixed K2 and C2 classes, as well as the fastest competitor aged over 50.

== Warm-up for Devizes to Westminster ==
The series is an excellent build up race for the world-famous Devizes to Westminster International Canoe Marathon. The 'DW' race is held every Easter over a course of 125 miles (201 kilometres) from Devizes in Wiltshire to Westminster in central London. It has been run since 1948. Starting at Devizes wharf, the route follows the Kennet and Avon Canal for 54 miles to Reading, where it joins the Thames. Another 54 miles later it reaches Teddington Lock, ending 17 miles later at Westminster Bridge.
