= Thameside =

Thameside could refer to:

- Network Rail route name for the London, Tilbury and Southend line
- Thameside (bus company)
- Thameside (HM Prison)
- Thameside Radio
- Thameside Series of canoe and kayak races

== See also ==
- Tameside, a borough of Greater Manchester
