= Kennet and Avon Canal Museum =

Museum in Wiltshire, England

Coordinates: 51.3552°N 1.9945°W

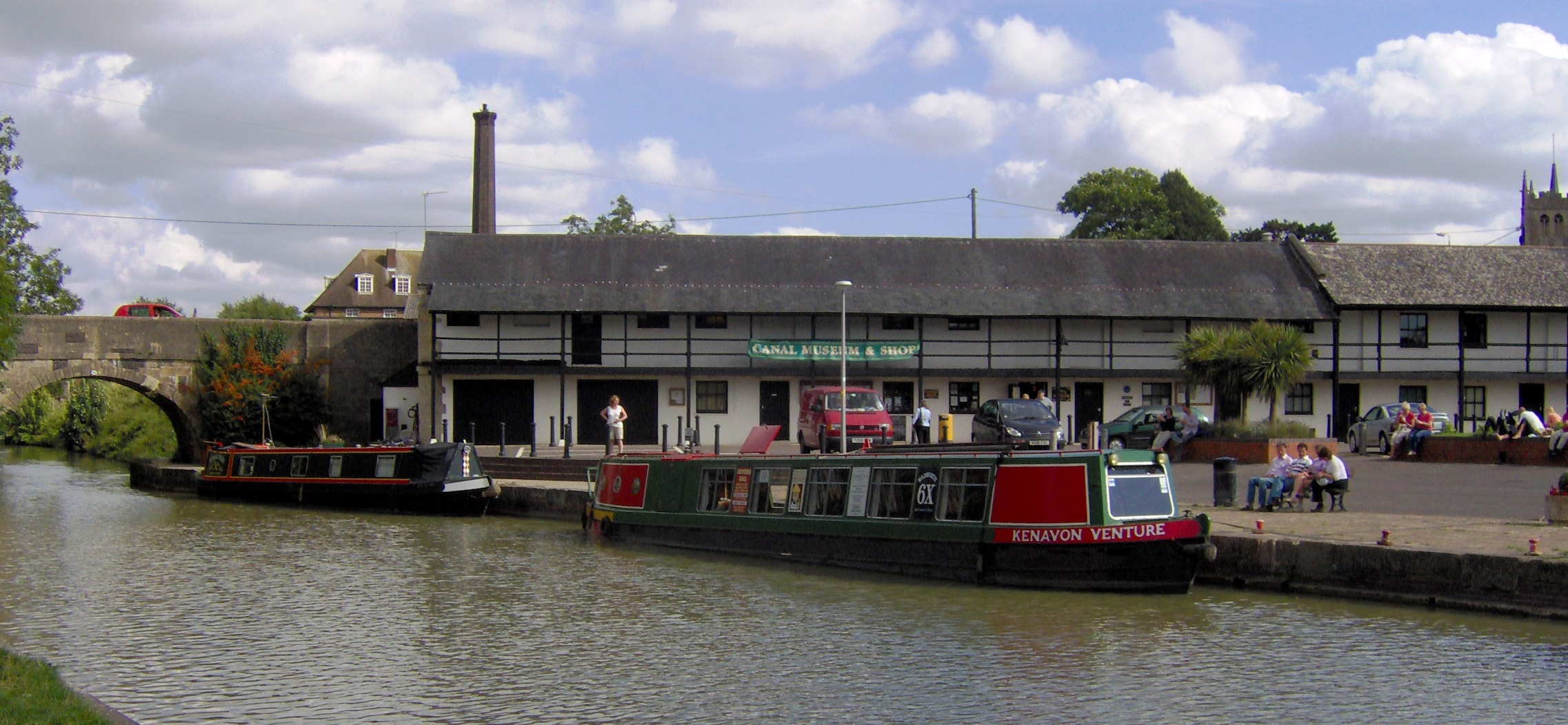
- Location: Devizes, Wiltshire, England
- Website: Kennet and Avon Canal Museum

The Kennet and Avon Canal Museum is a museum in Devizes, Wiltshire, England, covering the history of the Kennet and Avon Canal.

The museum is housed in a former bonded warehouse at Devizes Wharf, approximately 1 mile (1.6 km) from the Caen Hill Flight. The building was at one time used to store wine brought up the canal after being imported through Bristol Harbour.

The museum is operated by the Kennet and Avon Canal Trust, which also has its headquarters and a shop within the building.

The museum houses memorabilia, papers and photographs relating to the canal, which was constructed between 1794 and 1810. After falling into disuse in the late 19th and early 20th centuries, the canal was restored and formally reopened in 1990; the visitor book at the museum was signed by Queen Elizabeth II upon this reopening. The museum also holds models of locks and narrowboats, along with traditionally decorated implements traditionally used on the working boats.

== See also ==
- Canals of the United Kingdom
- History of the British canal system
