= Thameside Series =

Kayak races in England

The Thameside Series are two canoe and kayak races organised by Reading Canoe Club, that coincide with the Waterside Series races, organised by Newbury Canoe Club. The two races are Thameside 1 (a 12-mile race from Aldermaston, Berkshire to Reading), and Thameside 2 (a 19-mile race starting at Reading and ending in Marlow, Buckinghamshire).

== Thameside 1 ==
Starting from Aldermaston Bridge, Thameside 1 is a 12-mile, 13 portage time trial down the Kennet & Avon Canal, through Reading town centre and out onto the River Thames. A left turn where the mouth of the Kennet meets the Thames takes competitors upstream and over Caversham Lock, finishing upstream of Caversham Bridge at Reading Canoe Club on the right hand bank.

== Thameside 2 ==
This is a 19-mile, 8 portage downstream race with mass class starts, starting in Reading and finishing at Marlow. The finish was historically at the Longridge Activity Centre, Quarry Wood Road, Marlow, until 2022. A new finish location has yet to be announced. This race encompasses the Henley Straight - a 2-mile stretch over river running through Henley-on-Thames, Oxfordshire, which is notorious for its strong head and side winds.

== Classes ==
There are 12 classes: Junior K1; Junior K2; Senior K1; Senior K2; Senior C1; Senior C2; Veteran K1; Veteran K2; Ladies K1; Ladies K2; Mixed K2; Junior/Veteran K2. The Senior and Junior classes are the mostly highly contested, with records often being set each year. Thameside 1 is undertaken as a staggered start, whereby racers are set off in groups at set times. However, Thameside 2 is split into four staggered starts - slower K2 boats, slower K1 boats, faster K2 boats and finally faster K1 boats. Anytime paddler(s) ranked Division 3 or above in the Hasler Series of races must start in the faster starts by race rules. The mass starts are often areas of controversy, as the more competitive boats are often accused of 'pushing the line', and large waves being formed by the start, often capsizing boats further back. On average, about 200 boats compete in each race.

== Similar races ==
The Thameside Series is held at a similar time to the Waterside Series, a series of four races held by Newbury Canoe Club. The six races in total are also deemed to be good warm-up races for the Devizes to Westminster International Canoe Race (DW). However, the two series on their own are often considered to be good challenges in themselves, and are competed particularly strongly in the Junior K2 section by schools.
