= Woolhampton Reed Bed =

Protected area in Berkshire, England

- Site of Special Scientific Interest
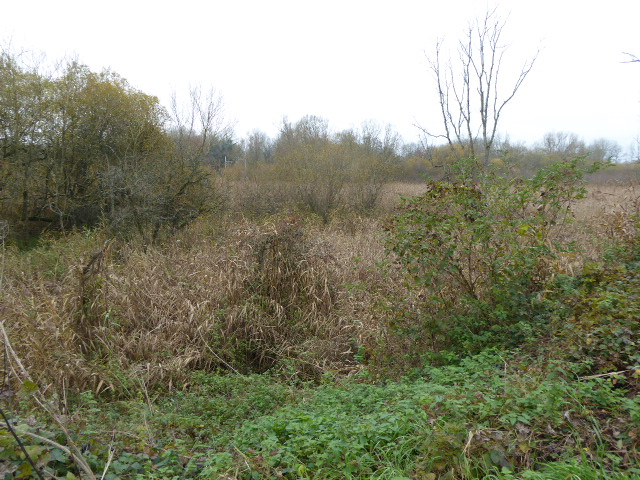

- Location within Berkshire
- Location of Woolhampton Reed Bed.
- Area of search: Berkshire
- Grid reference: SU 578 666
- Coordinates: 51.396°N 1.172°W
- Interest: Biological
- Area: 6.0 hectares (15 acres)
- Notification date: 1985
- Location map: Magic Map

Woolhampton Reed Bed is a 6-hectare (15-acre) biological Site of Special Scientific Interest in Woolhampton in Berkshire.

This site on London Clay mainly consists of dense reed beds, but there are also areas of carr woodland and tall fen. More than 300 moth species have been recorded, including the obscure wainscot, burnished brass and butterbur. The site is also important for flies, with over 160 species.

The site is private land with no public access.
