= Gripwood Quarry =

Geological Site of Special Scientific Interest in Wiltshire, England

Coordinates: 51.34150°N 2.25693°W

Gripwood Quarry (grid reference ST822603) is a 2.9-hectare geological Site of Special Scientific Interest (SSSI) located at Bradford-on-Avon in Wiltshire, England. It was notified in 1951 for its geological significance.

The quarry lies in a field to the southwest of the Bradford-on-Avon Tithe Barn, on the south side of the River Avon. It cuts into oolitic limestone and is divided by a central wall into upper and lower sections, which were last used for mushroom cultivation. The quarry walls are whitewashed, and a large wooden crane remains on site.

== Aliases ==
- Jones Hill Quarry – name used by Wiltshire Council.
- Bradford-on-Avon 9 – name given by Mendip Cave Rescue.
- Ruins – the older lower section was known by this name by the mushroom workers.
- ST86SW468 – SMR number, Wiltshire and Swindon Sites and Monument Record Search.
- Woodside Quarry – Gripwood was the underground and Woodside the opencast; the name Woodside sometimes applies to both.

== Sources ==
- Natural England citation sheet for the site (accessed 1 April 2022)
