= Cleeve Wood, Hanham =

Protected area in Gloucestershire, England

Coordinates: 51.43064°N 2.49765°W

Cleeve Wood
- Site of Special Scientific Interest
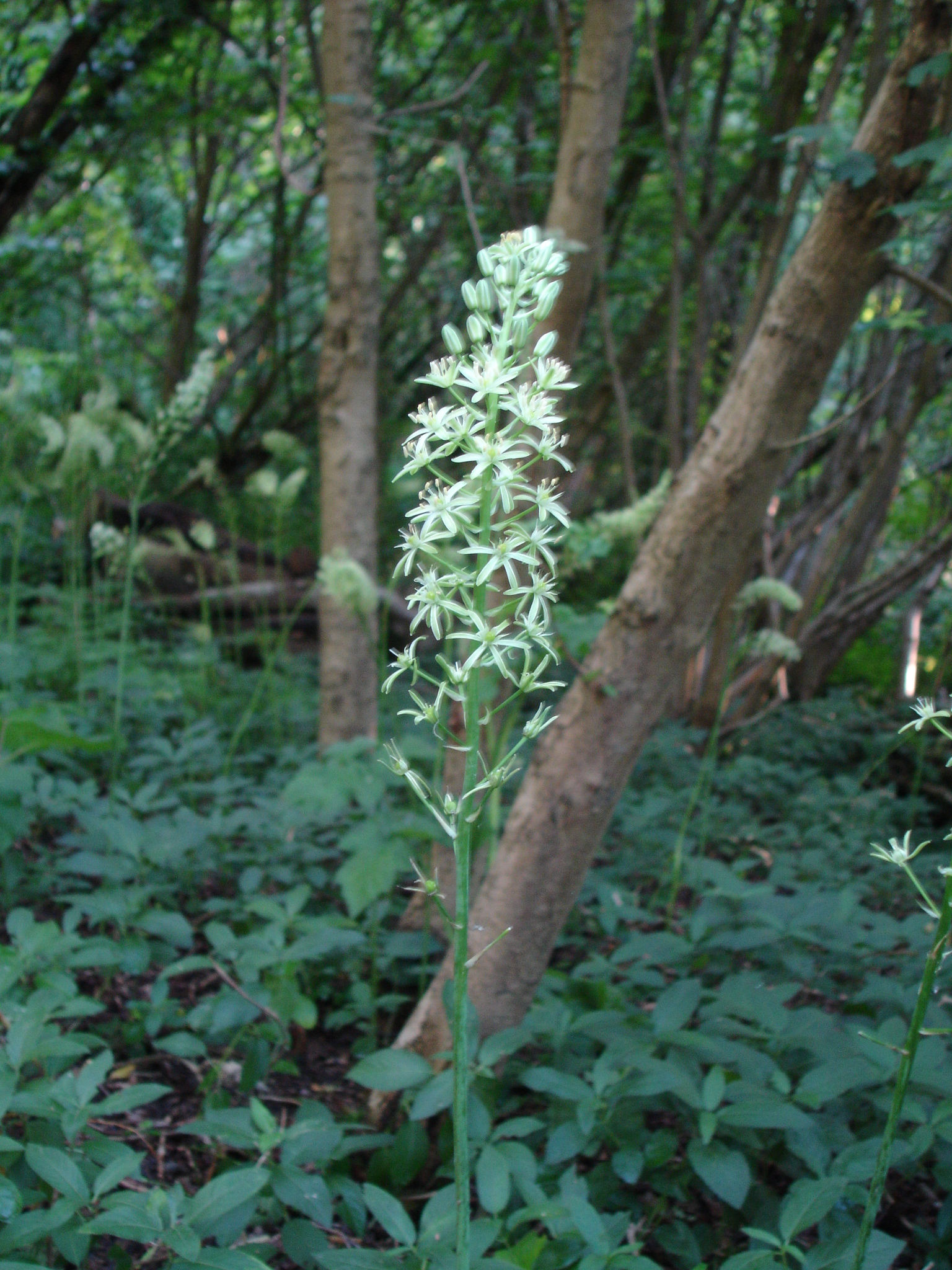
- Flowering Bath asparagus
- Location of Cleeve Wood.
- Area of search: Avon
- Grid reference: ST655703
- Interest: Biological
- Area: 8.9 ha (22 acres)
- Notification date: 1966
- Location map: English Nature

Cleeve Wood, Hanham is a (grid reference ST655703) is an 8.9 hectare biological Site of Special Scientific Interest (SSSI) in South Gloucestershire, notified in 1966.

Cleeve Wood is situated on the steep south facing slopes of the River Avon valley near to the City of Bristol.

The primary scientific interest of the wood is the particularly large population of Bath Asparagus (Ornithogalum pyrenaicum) which it supports. The Bath Asparagus in Cleeve Wood represents what is considered to be the largest and most stable population of this plant in this its centre of distribution.

The wood is derived from the calcareous ash-wych elm (southern variant) type but has been much planted with non-native species mainly beech (Fagus sylvatica) and sycamore (Acer pseudoplatanus) but with some horse chestnut (Aesculus hippocastanum) and Cypress trees Cupressus. In the more natural areas of the wood ash (Fraxinus excelsior) is dominant with occasional pedunculate oak (Quercus robur) standards. In such places the shrub layer is dominated by field maple (Acer campestre), hawthorn (Crataegus monogyna), elder (Sambucus nigra), hazel (Corylus avellana) and young wych elm (Ulmus glabra).

The field layer in many areas is dominated by ivy (Hedera helix), especially on the disturbed slopes. Other common ground flora includes dog's mercury (Mercurialis perennis), bluebell (Hyacinthoides non-scripta), stinking iris (Iris foetidissima), traveller's joy (Clematis vitalba) and slender false brome (Brachypodium sylvaticum).
