= Kennet Valley Alderwoods =

Site of Special Scientific Interest in Berkshire, England

- Site of Special Scientific Interest
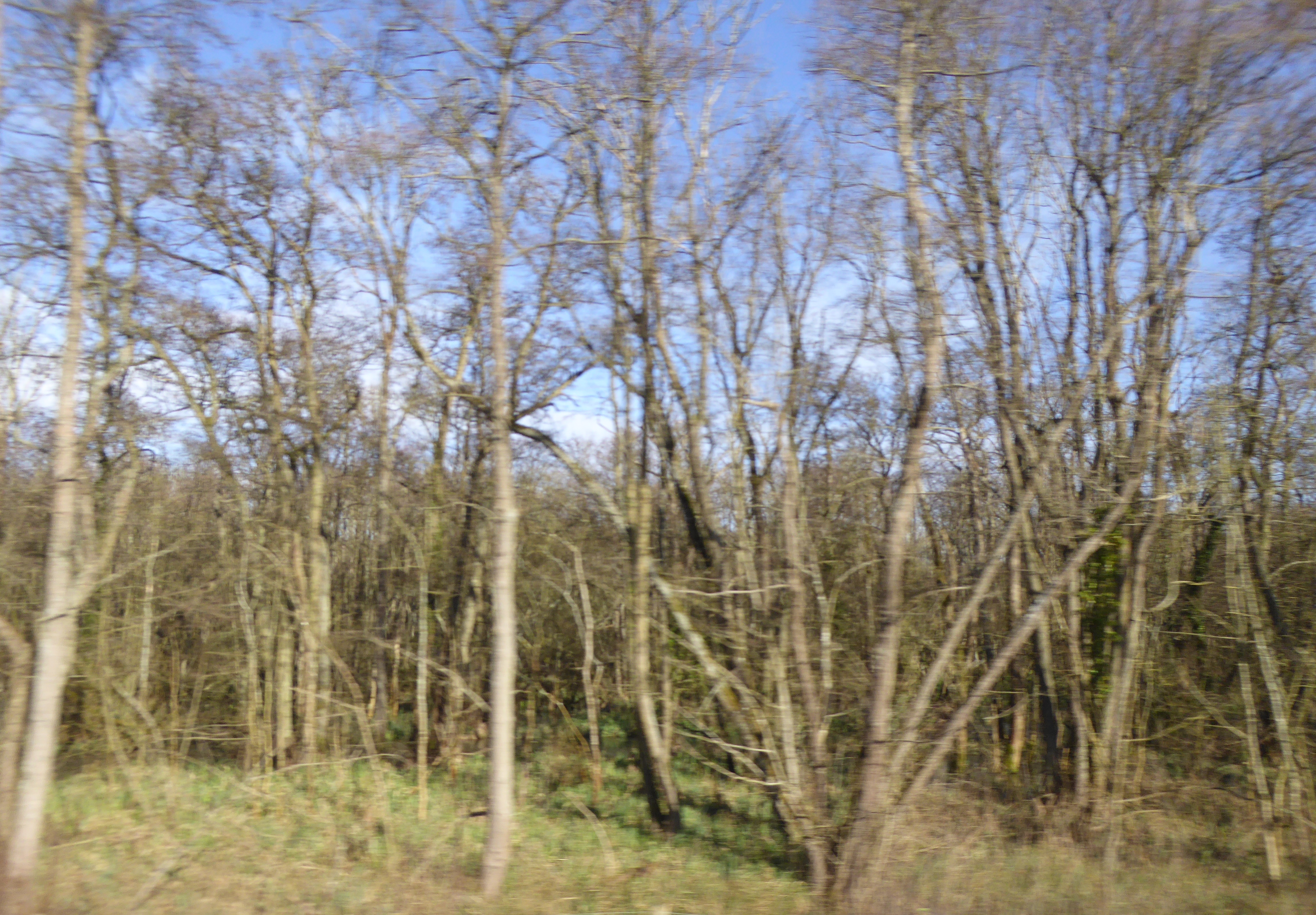

- Location within Berkshire
- Location of Kennet Valley Alderwoods.
- Area of search: Berkshire
- Grid reference: SU 407 674
- Coordinates: 51.404°N 1.416°W
- Interest: Biological
- Area: 57.3 hectares (142 acres)
- Notification date: 1997
- Location map: Magic Map

Kennet Valley Alderwoods is a 57.3-hectare (142-acre) biological Site of Special Scientific Interest west of Newbury in Berkshire. It is a Special Area of Conservation

Located at grid reference SU400675 and at grid reference SU444669, these woodlands are the largest remaining fragments of damp, ash-alder woodland in the Kennet floodplain. The SSSI includes two woods, the Wilderness and part of Ryott's Plantation, which are important because they support a very great diversity of plants associated with this woodland type, dominated by Alder (Alnus glutinosa), though Ash (Fraxinus excelsior) is abundant in places and there is occasional Oak (Quercus robur) and Wych Elm (Ulmus glabra). In addition to the wide range of higher plants the woods support a diverse bryophyte flora including the uncommon epiphytes Radula complanata, Zygodon viridissimus and Orthotrichum affine.

The site is private land with no public access.
