= Stidham Farm =

- Site of Special Scientific Interest
- Location within Somerset
- Location of Stidham Farm.
- Area of search: Avon
- Grid reference: ST682684
- Coordinates: 51.41372°N 2.45864°W
- Interest: Geological
- Area: 17.3 hectares (0.173 km^{2}; 0.067 sq mi)
- Notification date: 1991

Stidham Farm (grid reference ST682684) is a 17.3 hectare geological Site of Special Scientific Interest near the town of Keynsham, Bath and North East Somerset, notified in 1991.

This site contains Pleistocene terrace-gravels of the River Avon. At least 2 metres (7 ft) of sandy gravels are recorded, consisting of limestone clasts mainly, but also with Millstone Grit, Pennant Sandstone, flint and chert clasts. The site is of considerable importance for studies relating to the possible glaciation of the area, and of the terrace stratigraphy, particularly as it is one of only two accessible terrace deposits in this part of the Avon valley.
