= Bruce Tunnel =

British canal tunnel

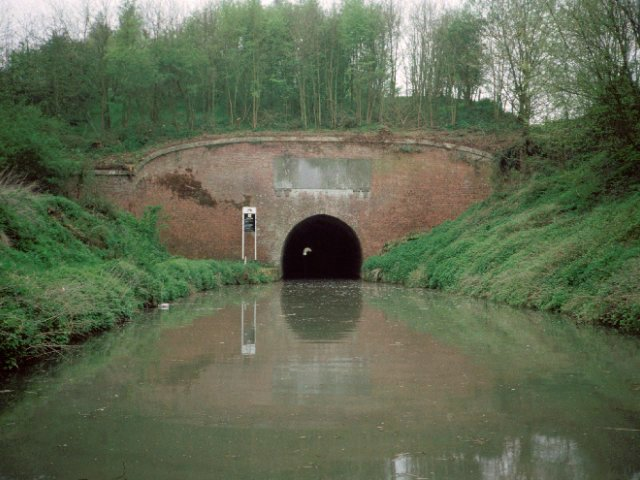
- Bruce Tunnel - Eastern Portal (as seen in 1992)
- Interactive map of Bruce Tunnel

Overview
- Location: Wiltshire, England
- Coordinates: 51.3677°N 1.6627°W
- OS grid reference: SU23586323
- Status: Open
- Waterway: Kennet and Avon Canal

Operation
- Constructed: 1806-1809
- Owner: Canal & River Trust

Technical
- Length: 502 yards (459 m)
- Towpath: No

The Bruce Tunnel is on the summit pound of the Kennet and Avon Canal between Wootton Top Lock and Crofton Locks in Wiltshire, England.

The tunnel is 502 yards (459 m) long. It is named after Thomas Brudenell-Bruce, 1st Earl of Ailesbury (1729–1814), the local landowner, who, when the canal was being built, would not allow a deep cutting through his land, and insisted on a tunnel instead.

At the eastern end of the tunnel is a plaque commemorating its construction:

The Kennet and Avon Canal Company
Inscribe this TUNNEL with the Name of
BRUCE
In Testimony of the Gratitude
for the uniform and effectual Support of
The Right honourable THOMAS BRUCE EARL of AILESBURY
and CHARLES LORD BRUCE his Son
through the whole Progress of this great National Work
by which a direct communication by Water was opened
between the Cities of LONDON and BRISTOL
ANNO DOMINI 1810

The tunnel has red brick portals, capped with Bath stone, each with a decorative plaque of Pennant stone. Construction was begun in 1806 and finished in 1809. It is lined with English bond brickwork and has a wide bore to cope with the 'Newbury Barges' used on this canal.

There is no towpath through the tunnel, so walkers and cyclists must walk across the top of the hill. When canal boats were still pulled by horses, the boatmen had to haul boats through the tunnel by hand, pulling on chains that ran along the inside walls.

To the north lies the Savernake Forest which is open to the public with footpaths, drives and picnic sites, hence the tunnel is also sometimes known as the Savernake Tunnel.

The main Paddington to Penzance 'Berks and Hants' railway line crosses the tunnel diagonally; both portals can be seen (from different points along the railway) from the windows of passing trains with the canal running close to the railway at each end.

The Bruce Tunnel is named in recognition of the support given by the Earl of Ailesbury, Thomas Brudenell-Bruce and his son Lord Charles Bruce through whose estate the canal route was planned. The alternative name is due to the close proximity of Savernake Forest, a former royal hunting forest near Marlborough. Located on the canal summit level, the tunnel was built to avoid the need for several locks that would have been required for a longer alternative route and while it was expensive to build the Earl insisted upon it instead of an unsightly but cheaper cutting. Construction began in 1806 and finished in 1809 supervised by construction engineer John Rennie. It is driven through Upper Greensand Sandstone, brick-lined throughout and the portals – also in brick - are Grade II listed. There are no open-air shafts or a towpath. It is a large, two-way working tunnel 458m in length, 5.13m wide at water level and with a headroom of approximately 4.0m. Depth of water varies between 1.2m and 1.75m with approximately 500mm depth of silt on the invert. There are a total of four possible construction shafts (determined from features within the tunnel lining) located at 52m, 165m, 292m and 413m. While there are no signs of major repairs having taken place many minor repairs have been necessary with evidence of brickwork patch repairs and re-pointing to mortar joints both above and below water level. Above the tunnel the depth of cover is a maximum of 10m and this is the site of two former stations – one for the Midland & South West Junction Railway and a second for the Great Western Railway incorporating a junction to the Marlborough branch line. Both stations and the M&SWJR are long gone but the Network Rail main line from London to Penzance remains. There is also a minor road crossing here.

== See also ==
- Locks on the Kennet and Avon Canal
