= River Avon =

River Avon may refer to:

== Australia ==
- Avon River (Mid-Coast Council), New South Wales
- Avon River (Wollongong), New South Wales
- Avon River (Gippsland, Victoria)
- Avon River (Grampians, Victoria)
- Avon River (Western Australia)

== Canada ==
- Avon River (Nova Scotia)
- Avon River (Ontario)

== New Zealand ==
- Avon River / Ōtākaro, in Christchurch
- Avon River (Marlborough)

== United Kingdom ==
=== England ===
- River Avon, Bristol, running from Acton Turville to Avonmouth (also known as the Bristol Avon).
- River Avon, Devon, running from Ryder's Hill to Bigbury (also known as River Aune).
- River Avon, Warwickshire, running from Naseby to Tewkesbury (also known as Shakespeare's Avon).
- River Avon, Hampshire, running from Pewsey to Christchurch (also known as the Salisbury Avon).
- Avon Water, Hampshire, running from Holmsley in the New Forest to Keyhaven.
- Little Avon River, running from Wickwar to Berkeley, in Gloucestershire.
- Tetbury Avon, a tributary of the Bristol Avon (also called Little Avon).

=== Scotland ===
- River Avon, Falkirk, running from near Cumbernauld to Grangemouth
- River Avon, Strathspey, running from Ben Macdui to Cragganmore
- Avon Water, running from south of Darvel to Motherwell

== See also ==
- Avon (disambiguation)
- List of rivers of Wales, (Welsh: afon for river, often anglicised "avon")
  - River Afan, running through Aberavon, Wales
- Aboño or Avono (originated from the same proto-Celtic root), Asturias, Spain
- List of tautological place names
