= Ingleburn =

Ingleburn may refer to:

- Ingleburn, New South Wales a place in Australia
- Tetbury Avon, a river in England, known locally as the Ingleburn
