= Brislington Brook =

River in Bristol, England

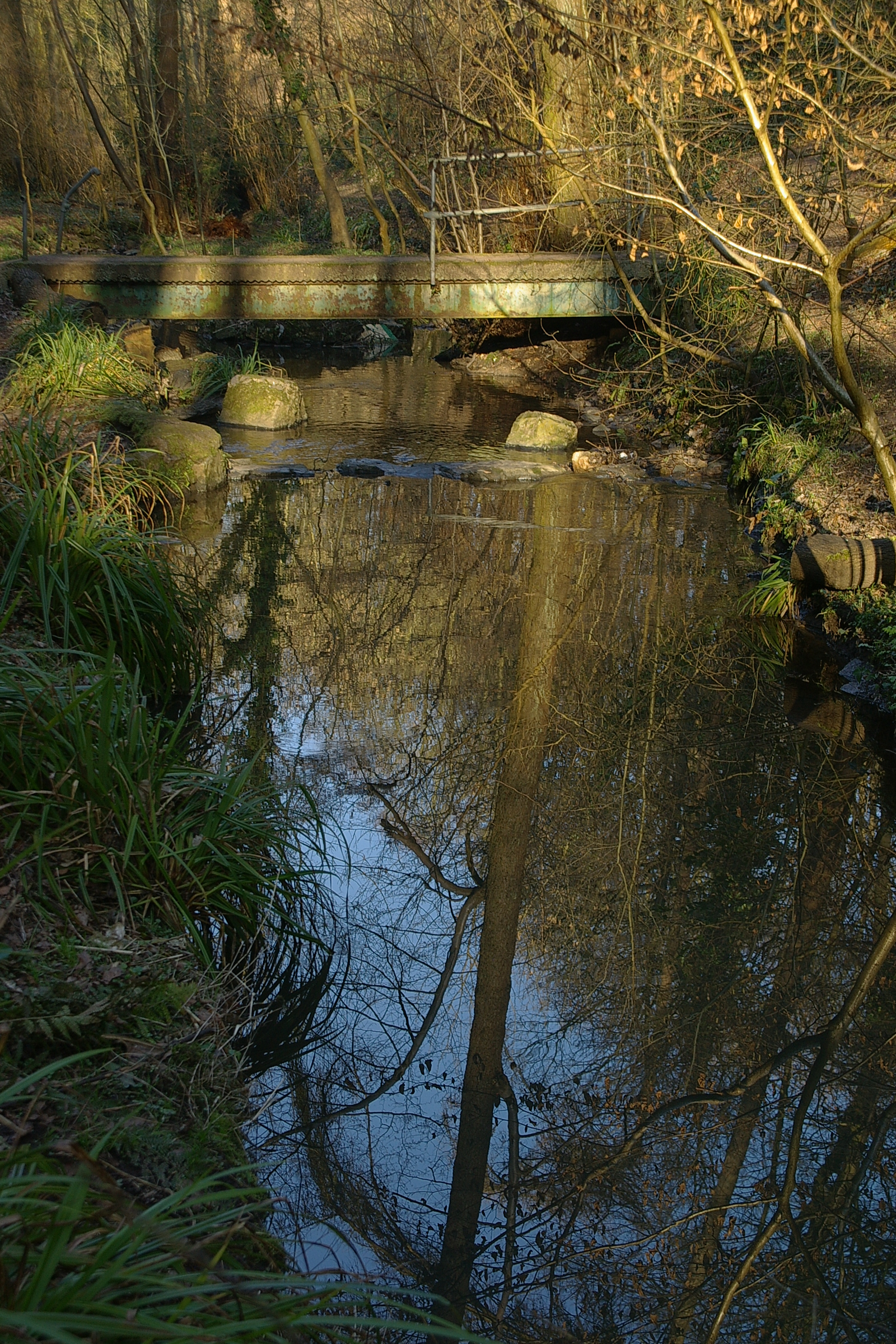
- Brislington Brook in St Annes Wood

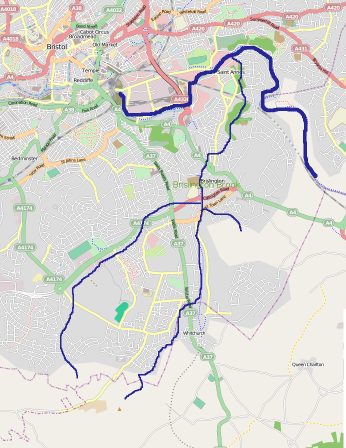
- Diagrammatic map of the Brislington Brook within Bristol

Location
- Country: England
- Region: West Country
- District: Bristol

Physical characteristics
- Source: Maes Knoll
  - location: Whitchurch, Bristol, England
  - coordinates: 51.3952°N 2.5729°W
  - elevation: 476 ft (145 m)
- Mouth: Bristol Avon
  - location: St Annes, Bristol, England
  - coordinates: 51.4539°N 2.5469°W
  - elevation: 33 ft (10 m)
- Length: 5 mi (8.0 km), northerly
- Basin size: 4.6 sq mi (12 km^{2})

Basin features
- River system: Bristol Avon

Brislington Brook is a short, 5 miles (8.0 km) long tributary of the Bristol Avon, rising on the northern slopes of Maes Knoll on the southern boundary of the city of Bristol, England. The stream has been badly affected by pollution but improvements have been made in the latter part of the twentieth century, and some wildlife is supported. St Anne's Well near the northern end of the brook was a major pilgrimage site for Christians in the Middle Ages.

== Course ==
Brislington Brook rises in twin tributaries fed by springs on the northern slopes of Maes Knoll, at the eastern end of Dundry Hill, just north of the boundary between Somerset and Bristol. One branch flows culverted through the Bamfield estate and then runs on the surface alongside Airport Road.

The other briefly enters Bath and North East Somerset, then enters a shallow valley, passing underneath Saltwell Viaduct, which carries the A37 Wells Road. The brook then re-enters Bristol, passing between Hengrove and Flowers Hill, on into Brislington, being met by a small unnamed tributary on the right bank just before it passes underneath the A4174 road, where it joins the western tributary at West Town Lane. Brislington Brook then turns in a northeast direction, passing underneath the A4 Bath Road and flowing down into Nightingale Valley in Broomhill, passing under a restored packhorse bridge. Near here, a side weir carries excess water in times of heavy rainfall into a tunnel which discharges into the Avon opposite Conham.

Brislington Brook itself then resumes its northerly course and is augmented by water from St Anne's Spring before running through industrial estates in St Annes Park before joining the Avon in a culvert at the site of the former St Annes Board Mills.

== History ==
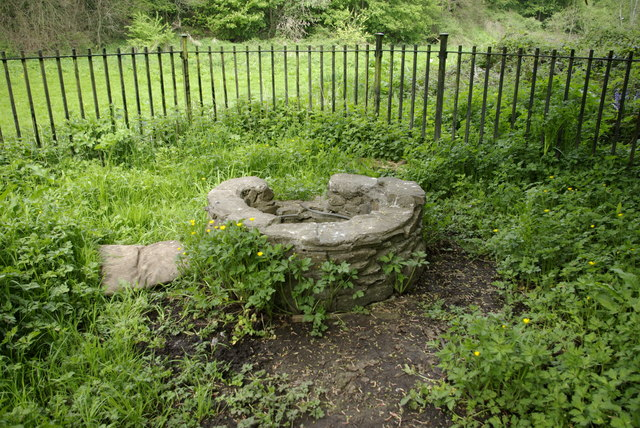
St Anne's well, Brislington, Bristol

St Anne's Spring was in medieval times a site of pilgrimage to venerate Saint Anne, mother of the Virgin Mary. A ferry from the northern (Gloucestershire) bank, which conveyed pilgrims across the Avon, was recorded in the Domesday Book in 1086. In 1485, Henry VII visited St Anne in the Wood, a chapel erected nearby, possibly by the Barons de la Warr who held Brislington Manor. The chapel was described by William Worcester, the noted fifteenth-century chronicler, as being 19 yards (17 m) long and 5 yards (4.6 m) wide, and containing a number of giant wax candles, some 80 feet (24 m) high, which had been donated by some of the city guilds. John Latimer, in his book Sixteenth Century Bristol, considered the height of the candles to have been exaggerated. The site was described by the early Protestant reformer Hugh Latimer "as being no less famous for pilgrimage than the shrine at Walsingham." After the Dissolution of the Monasteries the chapel was pulled down and the lands let to local gentry.

== Natural history and hydrology ==
Kingfishers and eels have been identified in Nightingale Valley, which also supports a range of trees and plants. The water quality is regularly sampled by Bristol City Council. In the 1990s improvements were made by identifying and rectifying illegal sewage connections, but water quality remains poor with relatively high biochemical oxygen demand and a high count of coliform bacteria.
