= Little Avon =

Little Avon may refer to two rivers in England:

- Little Avon River, in Gloucestershire, flowing into the River Severn
- Tetbury Avon, a tributary of the Bristol Avon in Gloucestershire and Wiltshire, also known as the Little Avon
