= Peter Hayes =

Peter Hayes may refer to:

- Peter Hayes (actor) (born 1957), Australian actor and director
- Peter Hayes (cricketer) (born 1954), former English cricketer
- Peter Hayes (died 2001), Australian horse trainer, son of Colin Hayes
- Peter Hayes (diplomat) (born 1963), British diplomat
- Peter Hayes (footballer) (born 1938), Australian footballer for Collingwood
- Peter Hayes (historian) (born 1946), Holocaust historian
- Peter Hayes (lawyer) (1953–2007), Australian barrister
- Peter Hayes (musician) (born 1976), American indie rock guitarist and singer
- Peter Hayes (sculptor) (born 1946)
- Peter J. Hayes, energy policy activist
- Peter Lind Hayes (1915–1998), vaudeville entertainer

== See also ==
- Peter Hay (disambiguation)
