= Cleveland Bridge =

Bridge in Bath, England

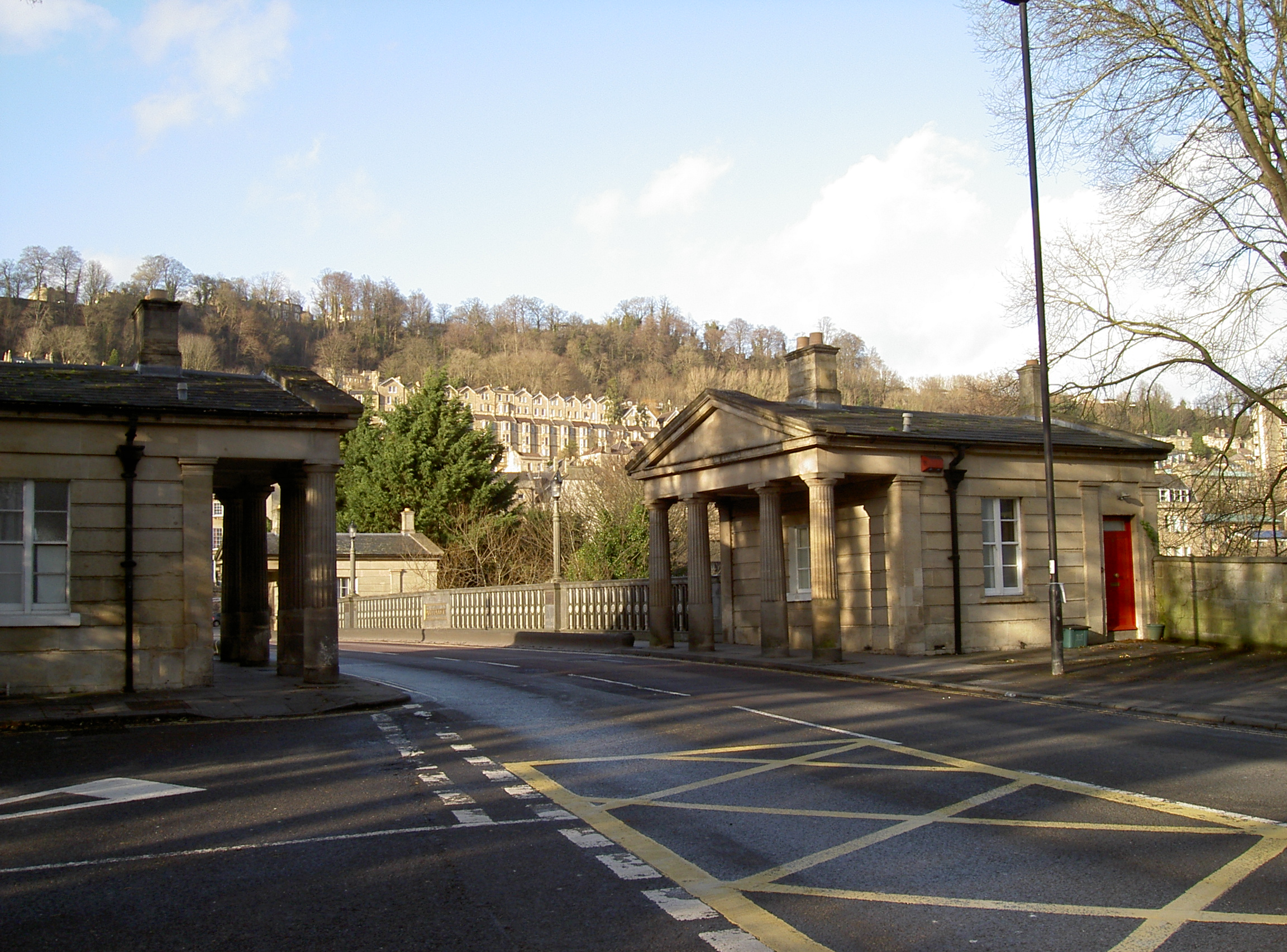
- Cleveland Bridge, January 2014
- Coordinates: 51°23′22″N 2°21′21″W
- Crosses: River Avon
- Locale: Bath, Somerset, England
- Heritage status: Grade II* listed structure

History
- Opened: 1826

Location
- Interactive map of Cleveland Bridge

Cleveland Bridge over the River Avon is a Grade II* listed building in the World Heritage Site of Bath, England. It is notable for the unusual lodges that adorn each corner in a style that could be likened to miniature Greek temples.

== Location ==
The bridge links the A4 (London Road) in Walcot on the north side of the Avon, with the A36 in Bathwick, via Bathwick Street at the point where it is joined by St. John's Road.

== History ==
Cleveland Bridge was built in 1826, by William Hazledine (Coalbrookdale Ironworks) with Henry Goodridge as the architect, on the site of a Roman ferry crossing. Named after the 3rd Duke of Cleveland, it spans the River Avon at Bathwick, and enabled further development of Georgian Bath to take place on the south side of the river. It was designed by architect Henry Goodridge to take the traffic of his day, horse-drawn vehicles and pedestrians, and was constructed using the warm golden Bath Stone and an elegant cast-iron arched span.

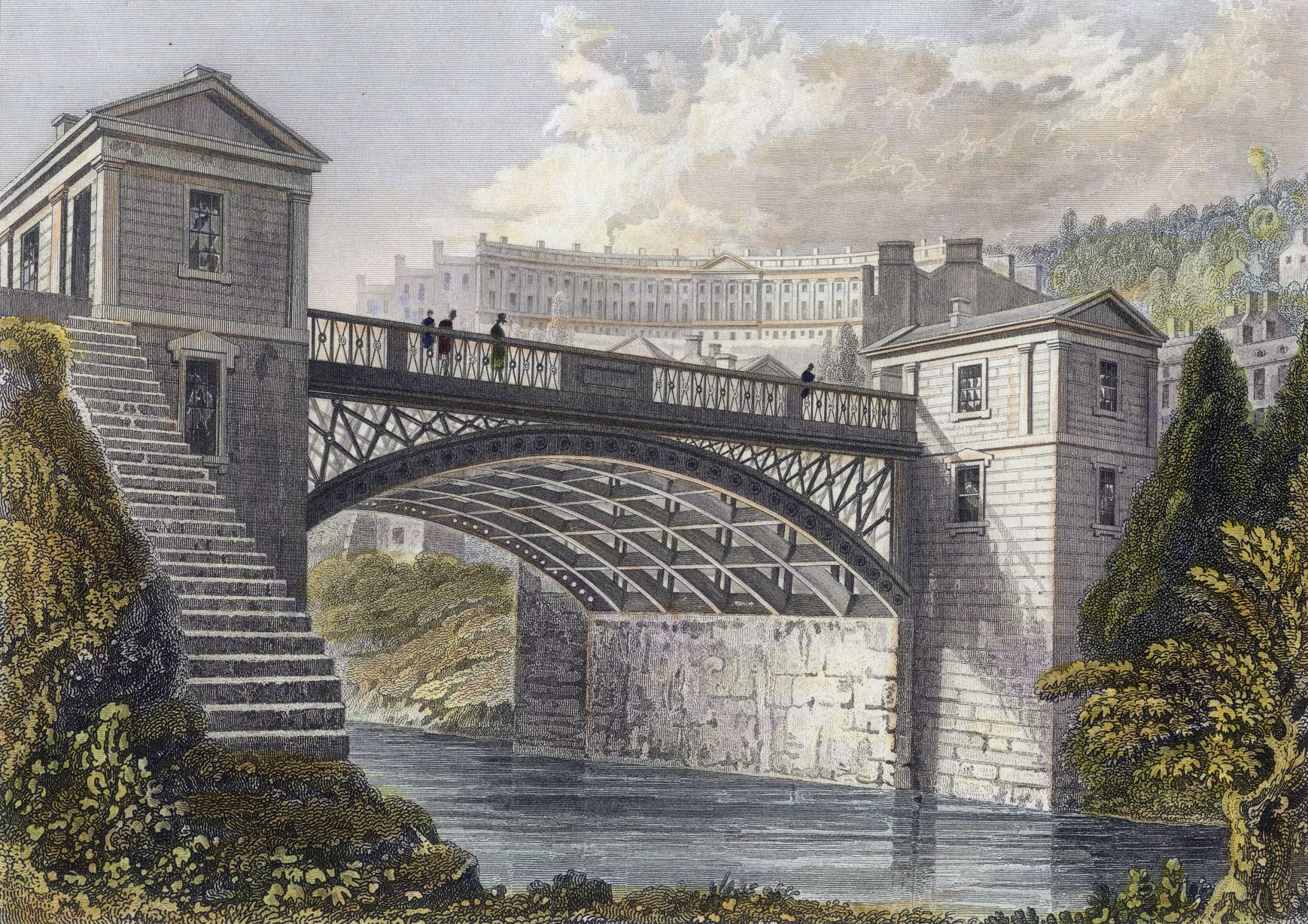
'The New Bridge at Bathwick' (1830 engraving by FP Hay)

A toll house was required to charge users of the bridge for the privilege of crossing. Rather than building merely one, Goodridge decided to install four — one on each corner — in order to maintain the absolute symmetry of his elegant neoclassical design. He provided each of these lodges with columns fronting onto the bridge, giving them the appearance of small ancient temples. This is what still gives the bridge its unique appearance today. Only one of the four (Number 1 next to St John's Road) was actually used as a toll house; the rest were always let to private tenants as small dwellings or shops. Given the small size of these dwellings (one room upstairs, two on the middle floor and one that would have flooded each winter in the basement) it seems extraordinary that the 1891 UK census clearly records a family of three people and two lodgers living in one of the lodges.

Bathwick Bridge Act 1805
- Act of Parliament
- Parliament of the United Kingdom
- Long title: An Act to enable the Trustees therein named to erect and build a new Bridge over the River Avon, on the North West Side of the Manor of Bath Wick, in the County of Somerset, to communicate with the Parish of Walcot, and the Road from the City of Bath to London; and also to raise a sufficient Sum of Money for that Purpose, by a Charge on the Trust Estates of the late General Pulteney.
- Citation: 45 Geo. 3. c. 87

Dates
- Royal assent: 10 July 1805

Other legislation
- Repealed by: Bath Corporation Act 1925

Status: Repealed

The bridge was constructed using funds subscribed by numerous local wealthy citizens to a specially formed Bathwick Bridge Company with a view to investors making a return on investment through the toll charges. In order to establish the bridge and the company an act of Parliament was obtained, the Bathwick Bridge Act 1805 (45 Geo. 3. c. 87), and, in a move which would later prove the undoing of the company, the level of the toll was fixed at one penny. The initial £10,000 cost of building the bridge was provided by a charge of the Duke of Cleveland's Bathwick estate. Unfortunately for the shareholders of the Bathwick Bridge Company, inflation took hold during the 19th century and, by the early 20th century, a one penny toll was not worth much. By the 1920s, the revenues from tolls no longer covered the costs of operating and maintaining the bridge.

The Bath Corporation Act 1925 (15 & 16 Geo. 5. c. xciii) allowed the city council to take over the bridge from the now bankrupt Bathwick Bridge Company. To much celebration, it was freed it from tolls for all traffic on 20 June 1927 and extensively restored during 1928 and 1929. Cleveland Bridge is still free to use today, although the next bridge upstream at Bathampton is one of the UK's few remaining privately owned toll bridges.

After the Second World War, a shortage of cash and materials and a general lack of interest in Bath's architecture meant that the fabric of the bridge was neglected. By the 1980s, three out of four of the lodges were derelict and unfit for human habitation. Concerned at the neglect of this unique structure by its owners, Bath and North East Somerset Council, a group of local individuals formed a charity (the Bath Historical Buildings Trust) to take a very long lease on three of the lodges and to restore them so that they could once again become homes for people. This work is almost complete.

In 2019 a survey showed some structural parts were near end of life, resulting in a temporary 18-tonne weight restriction being imposed from January 2020. Major repair work was to be carried out in 2021, assisted by £3.5 million of Department for Transport funding, involving the temporary closure of the bridge. During the works more extensive problems were found; the hanger bars uncommon in bridge design, which support the main trusses, were unexpectedly found to be corroded.

== Capacity ==
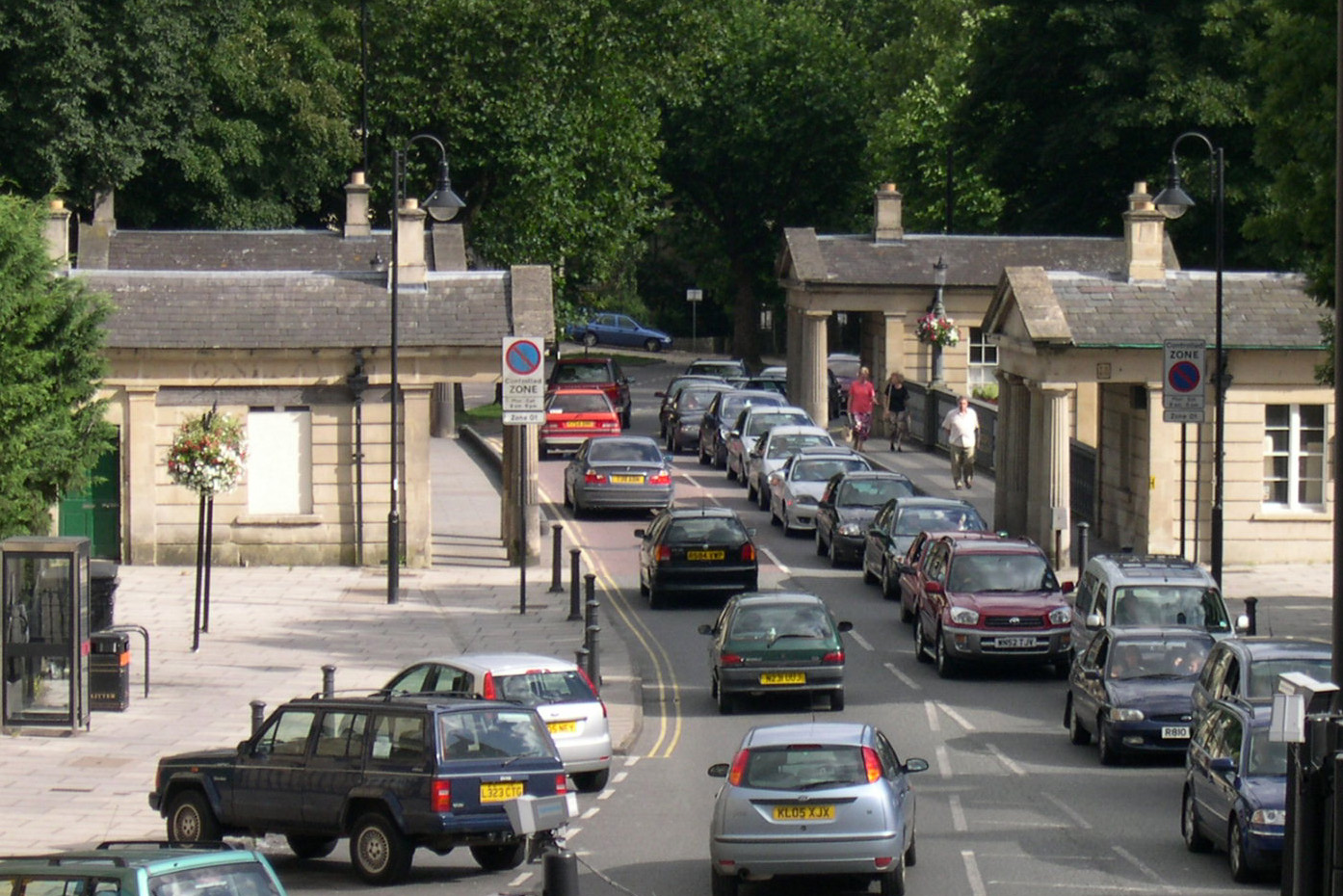
Cleveland Bridge during Bath's rush hour

Around the same time that the bridge was freed from toll, heavier vehicles powered by the internal combustion engine were making their way onto the roads. The slender cast iron span of Cleveland Bridge required reinforcement. Four reinforced concrete trusses were inserted under the roadway around 1929, giving it the strength which today allows it to carry 38 tonne trucks. Bath has no eastern bypass, so the bridge has become a heavily used "Euro route" for large trucks on their way from Britain's south coast ports to the docks further north. High volumes of local traffic at peak travelling times make this a regular traffic slow spot in the mornings and evenings, carrying 17,000 vehicles a day.

== Emergency services connection ==
Despite the frequent traffic jams on Cleveland Bridge, Bath's only fire and ambulance stations are located next to it and the drivers of emergency vehicles are assertive in expressing their need to cross on the way to respond to an emergency call. The connection between the bridge and these services is long established because the lodge formerly used as a toll house (Number 1) was the 999 response centre for the city of Bath for some time after the Second World War.

== The bridge today ==
The distinctive lodges of Cleveland Bridge are now restored to their former glory and are back in use as homes. One, however, remains a working premises. Sculptures by ceramic artist Peter Hayes are on display around the world but he still works from a studio below his gallery at lodge number 2. His techniques for creating a patina include immersing half-completed pieces for a period of months in the river, where they absorb minerals from the water.
