= Newton St Loe SSSI =

Protected area in Somerset, England

Newton St Loe
- Site of Special Scientific Interest
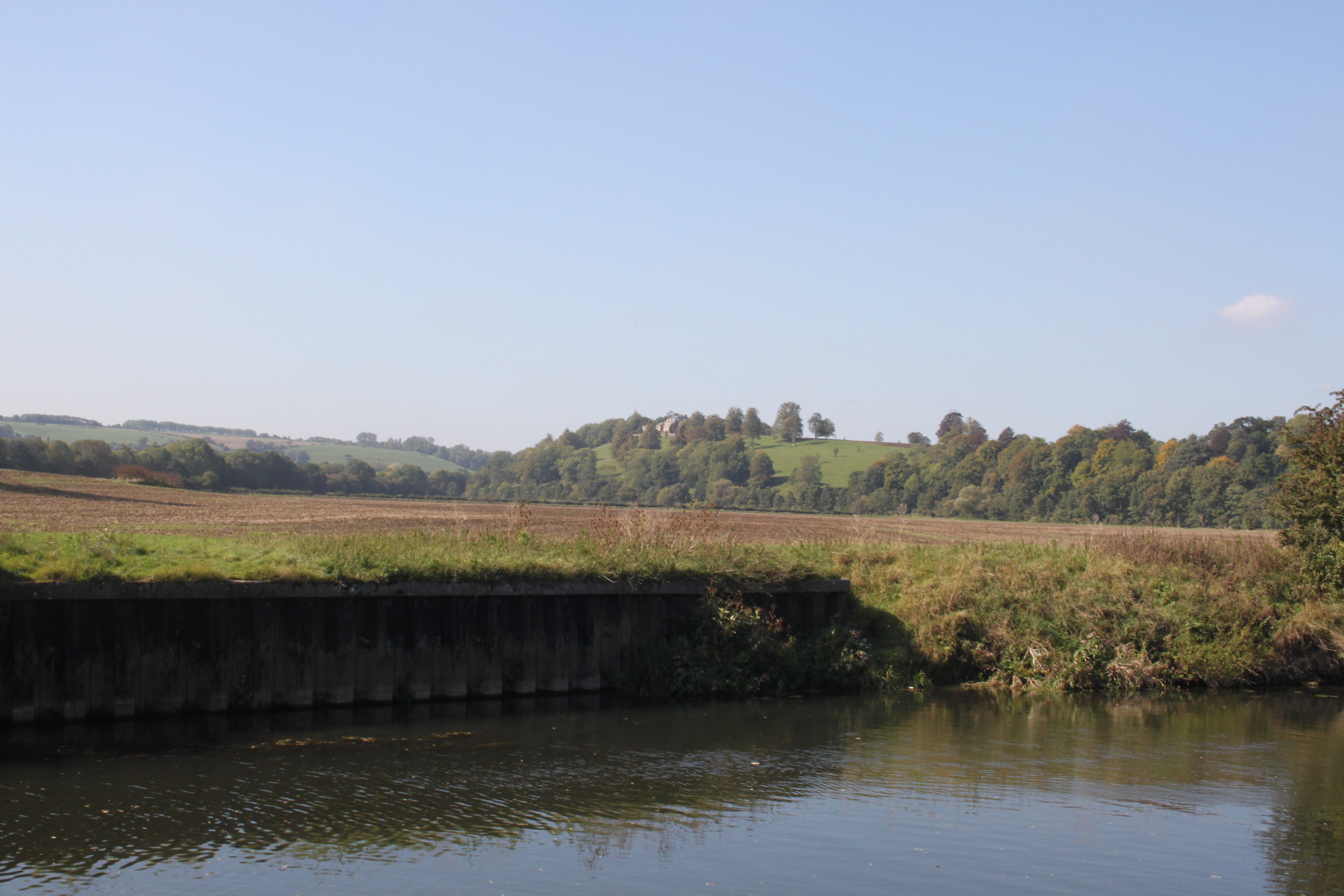

- Location within Somerset
- Location of Newton St Loe.
- Area of search: Avon
- Grid reference: ST715657
- Coordinates: 51.38962°N 2.41098°W
- Interest: Geological
- Area: 2.26 hectares (0.0226 km^{2}; 0.0087 sq mi)
- Notification date: 1992

Newton St Loe SSSI (grid reference ST715657) is a geological Site of Special Scientific Interest (SSSI) close to the River Avon, near the village of Newton St Loe in Bath and North East Somerset. It was notified in September 1992. It is 2.26 hectares in size.

The site was featured in the Geological Conservation Review.

The site is designated as an SSSI because it represents the only remaining known exposure of fossiliferous Pleistocene gravels along the River Avon. In conjunction with other sites within the wider area, it has aided the development of a scientific understanding of the history of early glaciation within South West England.

== Site description ==
The citation sheet for this SSSI describes the site as follows:

This site consists of a river terrace approximately 10 m above the present River Avon. The Pleistocene fluvial gravels temporarily exposed at Newton St Loe exhibit scour-and-fill structures. The trough cross bedding is consistent with the gravels having been laid down by a braided river, a fluvial style usually associated with cold stage sedimentation. The provenance of these gravels is complex and they contain material from South Wales and Midland sources. The gravels were subsequently weathered and decalcified during interstadial episodes and cryoturbated under stadial conditions.

== Reasons for notification ==
The bodies of mammoths (Mammuthus) and horses (Equus) have been found at the site. It was not possible to identify the species however, due to the poor state of the specimens.

== Sources ==
- English Nature citation sheet for this SSSI (accessed 2006-07-07)
