= The Corridor, Bath =

Shopping arcade in Bath, Somerset, England

The Corridor
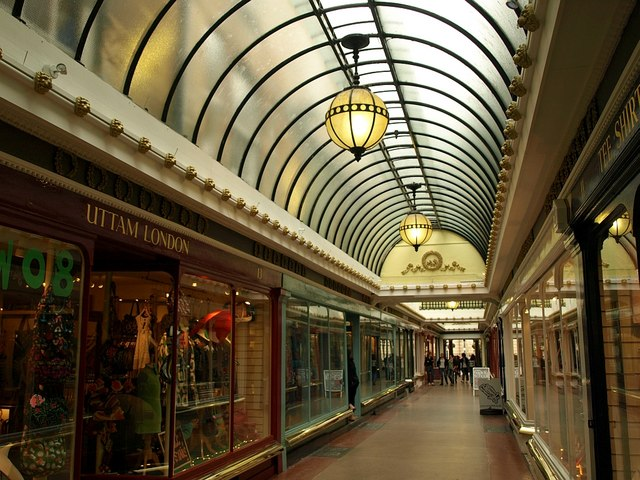

- Location within Somerset
- 51°22′56″N 2°21′33″W
- Location: Bath, Somerset, England

History
- Built: 1825

Site notes
- Architect: Henry Goodridge

Listed Building – Grade II
- Official name: 1–11, The Corridor
- Designated: 12 June 1950
- Reference no.: 1395345

Listed Building – Grade II
- Official name: 11A and 12A, The Corridor
- Designated: 12 June 1950
- Reference no.: 1395347

Listed Building – Grade II
- Official name: 12–22, The Corridor
- Designated: 12 June 1950
- Reference no.: 1395348

The Corridor is one of the world's earliest retail arcades, designed by architect Henry Goodridge and built in 1825, in Bath, Somerset, England.

The fashion for arranging shops in arcades arose in Paris in the late 18th century. The Corridor followed the trend set by London's Burlington Arcade.

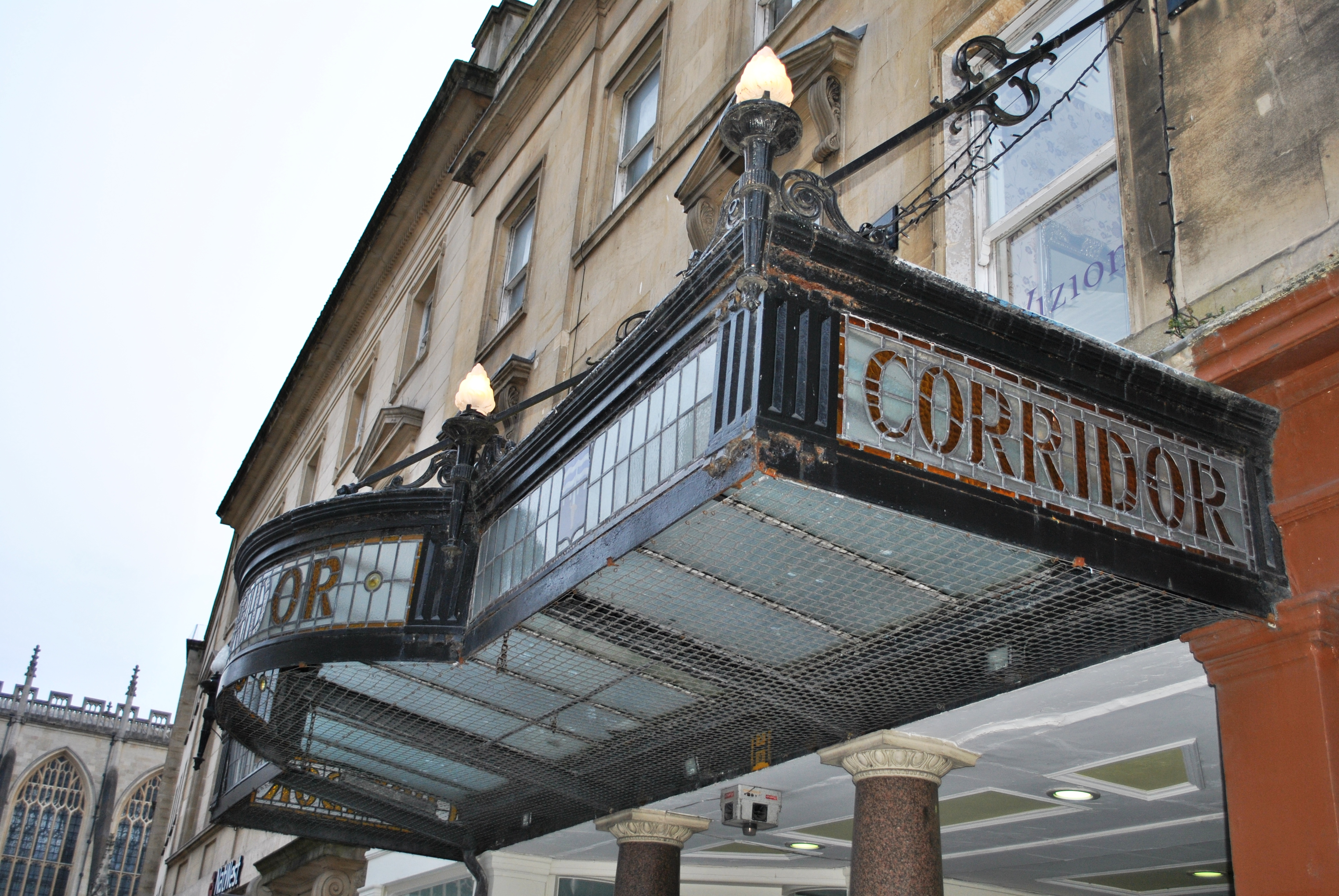
Eastern entrance to The Corridor

The Grade II listed arcade has a glass roof. The High Street end has a Doric colonnade. Each end has marble columns. A musicians' gallery, with a wrought-iron balustrade and gilt lions' heads and garlands, is in the centre of the arcade.

Number 7 was the photographic studio of William Friese-Greene.

== Bombing ==
On 9 December 1974, a telephone warning alerted police in Bath that a bomb was shortly to explode in the Corridor. The subsequent blast at 9.10pm from a 5 lb bomb planted by the Irish Republican Army caused huge damage and forced the Corridor to undergo a major renovation programme. No one was hurt in the blast.
