= River Avon, Bristol =

River in the south west of England

River Avon Bristol Avon
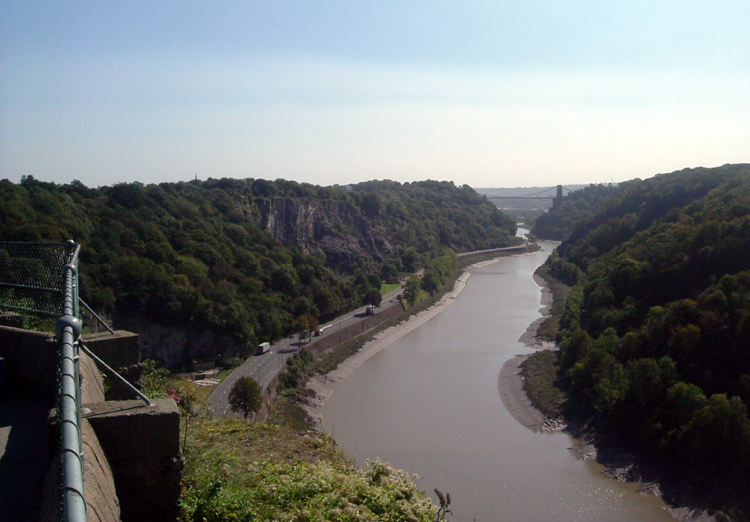
- The Avon Gorge and Clifton Suspension Bridge

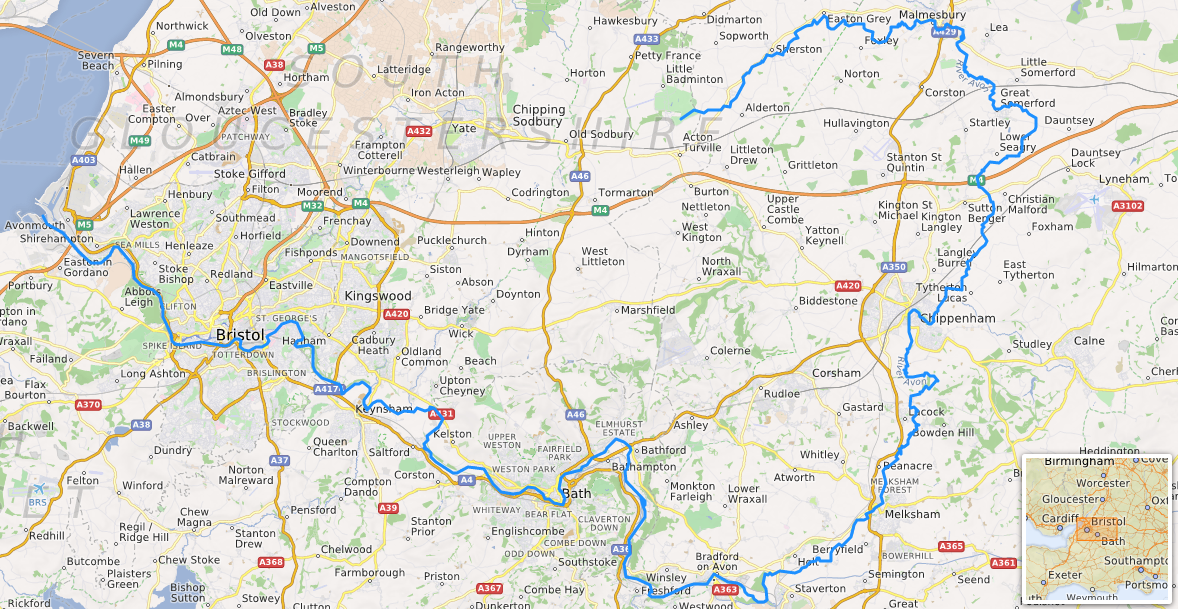
- Course of the Avon
- Etymology: Common Brittonic abona, 'river'

Location
- Country: England
- Counties of England: Gloucestershire, Wiltshire, Somerset, Bristol
- Towns/cities: Chippenham, Melksham, Bradford on Avon, Bath, Bristol

Physical characteristics
- Source: Didmarton
  - location: Gloucestershire, England
  - coordinates: 51°31′49″N 2°16′26″W
  - elevation: 120 m (390 ft)
- Mouth: Severn Estuary
  - location: Avonmouth, Bristol, England
  - coordinates: 51°30′22″N 2°43′06″W
- Length: 134 km (83 mi)
- Basin size: 2,308 km^{2} (891 sq mi)
- Discharge
  - location: Bath
  - average: 21.98 m^{3}/s (776 cu ft/s)
  - minimum: 2.457567 m^{3}/s (86.7882 cu ft/s)
  - maximum: 310 m^{3}/s (11,000 cu ft/s)

Basin features
- Tributaries
  - left: River Malago, Brislington Brook, River Chew, Corston Brook, Midford Brook, River Frome, Paxcroft Brook, River Biss, Semington Brook, Cocklemore Brook, River Marden, Brinkworth Brook, Woodbridge Brook, Tetbury Avon
  - right: River Trym, River Frome (Bristol), Siston Brook, River Boyd, Lam Brook, Bybrook, Gauze Brook
- River system: River Severn

The River Avon (/ˈeɪvən/ AY-vən) is a river in the southwest of England. To distinguish it from a number of other rivers of the same name, it is often called the Bristol Avon. The name 'Avon' is from an ancestor of the Welsh word afon, meaning 'river'.

The Avon rises just north of the village of Acton Turville in South Gloucestershire, before flowing through Wiltshire into Somerset. In its lower reaches from Bath (where it meets the Kennet and Avon Canal) to the Severn Estuary at Avonmouth near Bristol, the river is navigable and is known as the Avon Navigation.

The river is approximately 83 miles (134 km) long, although there are just 19 miles (31 km) as the crow flies between the source and its mouth in the Severn Estuary. The catchment area is 2,220 square kilometres (860 sq mi).

== Etymology ==
The name "Avon" is loaned from the Common Brittonic abona, "river", which survives in the Welsh word afon [ˈavɔn]. "River Avon", therefore, literally means "river river"; several other English and Scottish rivers share the name. The County of Avon that existed from 1974 to 1996 was named after the river, and covered Bristol, Bath, and the lower Avon valley.

== Course ==
The Avon rises on the southern edge of the Cotswold hills, at Didmarton in Gloucestershire; at Joyce's Pool a plaque marks the source. It flows south-east into Wiltshire to Sherston, where it is joined by the Luckington Brook which drains an area west of Luckington that includes the Badminton House estate.

From Sherston the river flows east to Malmesbury, where it is joined by its first major tributary, the Tetbury Avon, which rises just east of Tetbury in Gloucestershire. This is known locally as the Ingleburn, which in Old English means 'English river'. The two rivers flow north and south of a rocky outcrop, almost creating an island for the ancient hilltop town of Malmesbury to sit on. Upstream of this confluence the river is sometimes referred to as the 'River Avon (Sherston branch)' to distinguish it from the Tetbury branch.

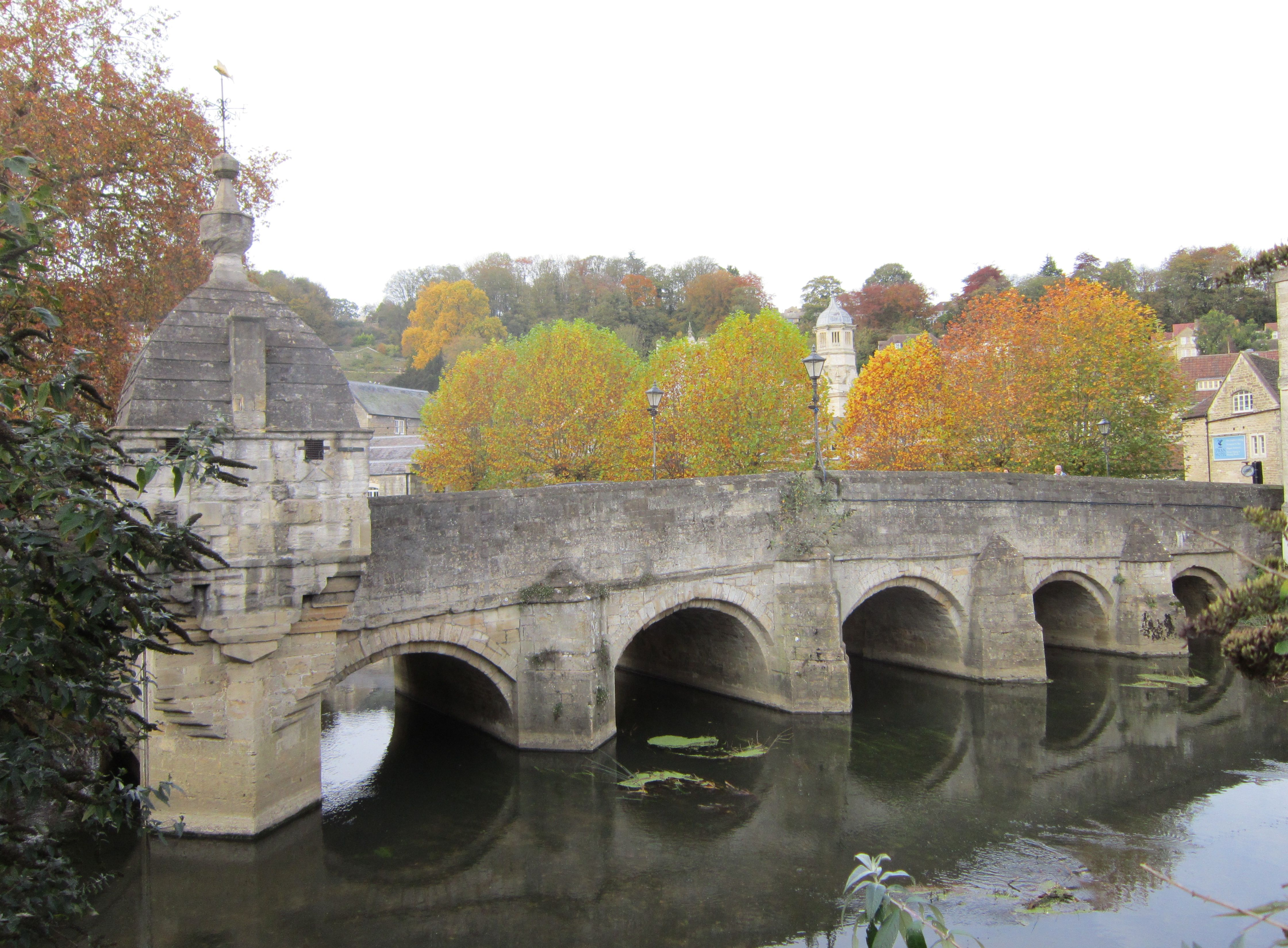
The Town Bridge at Bradford on Avon

At the point where the two rivers merge, the Avon turns southeast away from the Cotswolds and then quickly south into the clay Dauntsey Vale, where it is joined by the River Marden, until it reaches the biggest town so far, Chippenham. The wide vale is now known as the Avon Vale, and the river flows on via Lacock to Melksham, then turns north-west through Bradford-on-Avon, where the centre of the town grew up around a ford, hence the origin of the town's name ("Broad-Ford"). This was supplemented in Norman times by the Grade I listed bridge that still stands today; originally a packhorse bridge, it was widened in the 17th century by rebuilding the downstream side.

The Avon Valley between Bradford-on-Avon and Bath is an example of a valley where four forms of ground transport are found: road, rail, river, canal. The river passes under the Avoncliff and Dundas Aqueducts which carry the Kennet and Avon Canal, and at Freshford is joined by the Somerset River Frome. Avoncliff Aqueduct was built by John Rennie and chief engineer John Thomas, between 1797 and 1801.

The aqueduct has three arches and is 110 yards (100 m) long with a central elliptical arch of 60 ft (18 m) span with two side arches each semicircular and 34 ft (10 m) across, all with V-jointed arch stones. The spandrel and wing walls are built in alternate courses of ashlar masonry, and rock-faced blocks. The central span sagged soon after it was built and has been repaired many times.

The Dundas Aqueduct was built by the same team between 1797 and 1801 and completed in 1805. James McIlquham was appointed contractor. The aqueduct is 150 yards (137.2 m) long with three arches built of Bath Stone, with Doric pilasters, and balustrades at each end. The central semicircular arch spans 64 feet (19.5 m); the two oval side arches span 20 feet (6.1 m). It is a Grade I listed structure, and was the first canal structure to be designated as a Scheduled Ancient Monument in 1951. The stretch of river below and above the aqueduct, where it is joined by Midford Brook, has been used by rowing crews from Monkton Combe School since at least the beginning of the 1900s.

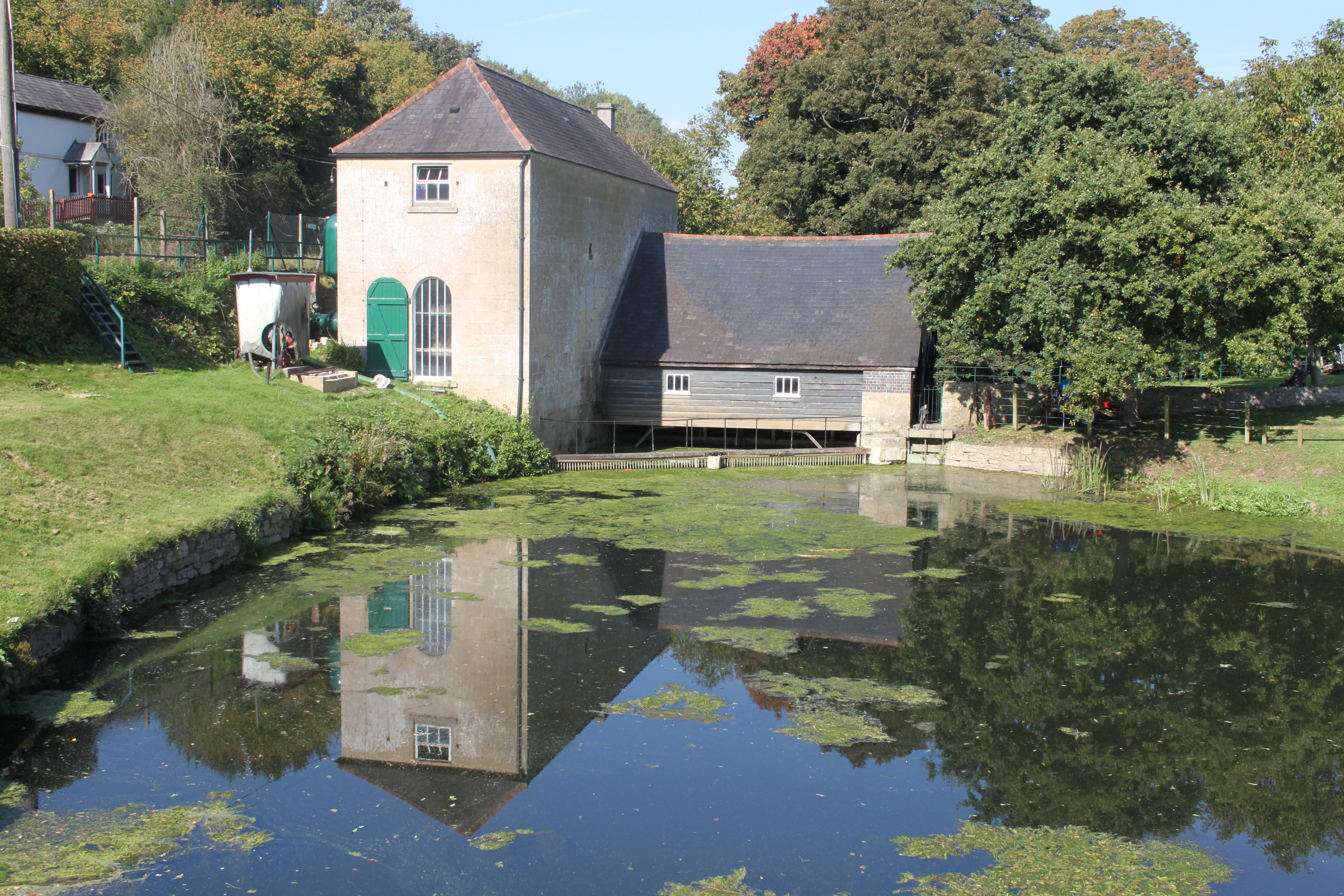
Claverton Pumping Station

It then flows past Claverton Pumping Station, which pumped water from the River Avon by Warleigh Weir into the canal, using power from the flow of the river. The pumping station is located in a pump house built of Bath Stone, located at river level. Water is diverted from the river by Warleigh Weir, about 200 yd (180 m) upstream. The water flows down a leat to the pumping station, where it powers a water wheel, 24 ft (7.3 m) wide and 17 ft (5.2 m) in diameter, with 48 wooden slats. At full power the wheel uses 2 tons (2 tonnes) of water per second and rotates five times a minute.

The water wheel drives gearing which increases the speed to 16 rpm. From here, cranks drive vertical connecting rods which transfer the energy to two 18 ft (5.5 m) long cast iron rocking beams. Each rocking beam in turn drives an 18 in (0.5 m) diameter lift pump, which also take their supply from the mill leat. Each pump stroke raises 50 imperial gallons (230 L; 60 US gal) of water to the canal. In 1981, British Waterways installed two 75 horsepower (56 kW) electric pumps just upstream from the station.

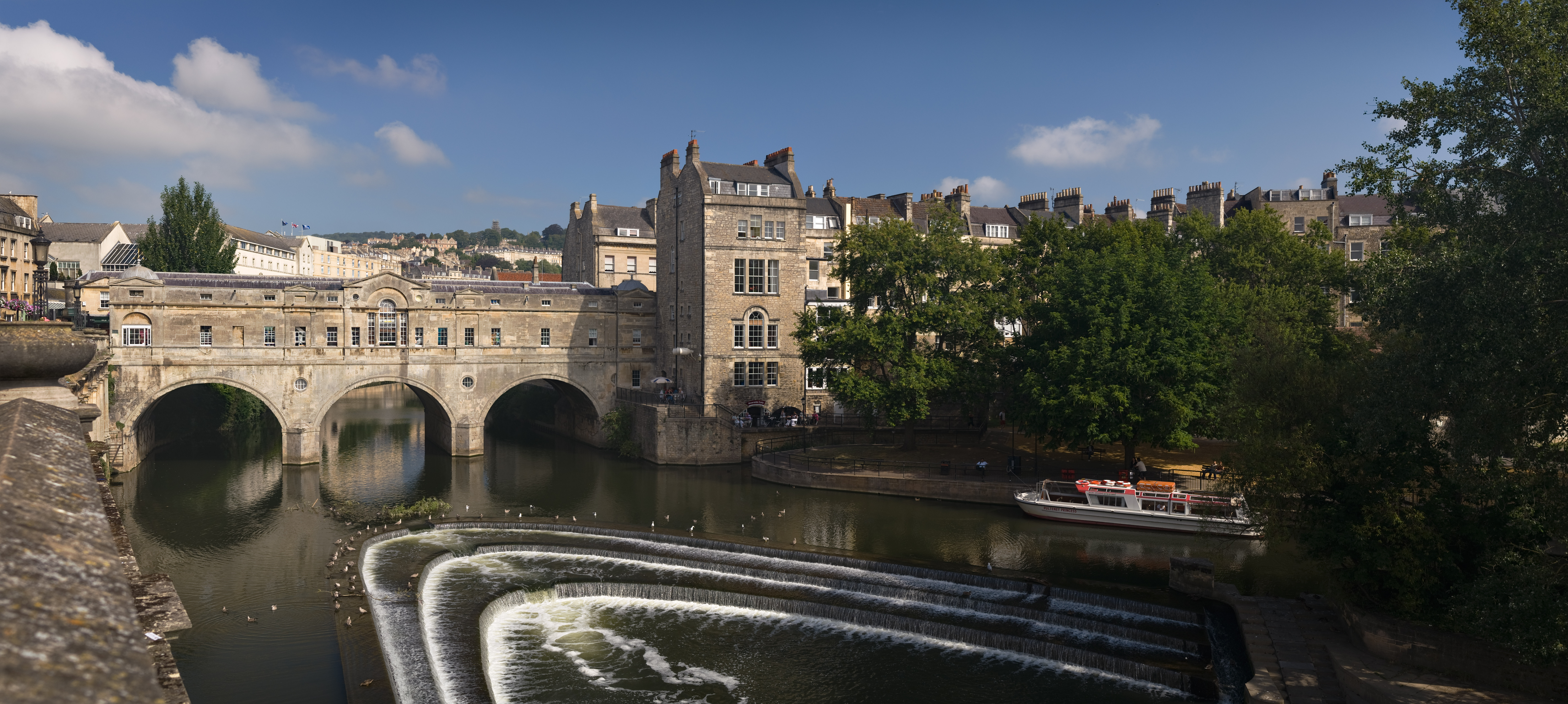
Palladian Pulteney Bridge and the weir at Bath

The Avon then flows through Bathford, where it is joined by the Bybrook River, and Bathampton where it passes under the Bathampton Toll Bridge. It is joined by the Lam Brook at Lambridge in Bath and then passes under Cleveland and Pulteney Bridges and over the weir.

Cleveland Bridge was built in 1826 by William Hazledine, owner of the Coalbrookdale Ironworks, with Henry Goodridge as the architect, on the site of a Roman ferry crossing. Named after the 3rd Duke of Cleveland, it spans the River Avon at Bathwick, and enabled further development of Georgian Bath to take place on the south side of the river. It was designed by architect Henry Goodridge to take the traffic of his day, horse-drawn vehicles and pedestrians, and was constructed using Bath Stone and a cast iron arched span.

Pulteney Bridge was completed in 1773 and is designated by English Heritage as a Grade I listed structure. The bridge was designed by Robert Adam, and is one of only four bridges in the world with shops across the full span on both sides. It is named after Frances Pulteney, heiress in 1767 of the Bathwick estate across the river from Bath.

Floods in 1799 and 1800 wrecked the north side of the bridge, which had been constructed with inadequate support. It was rebuilt by John Pinch the Elder, surveyor to the Pulteney estate, in a less ambitious version of Adam's design. Bath and North East Somerset council have discussed plans to ban vehicles from the bridge and turn it into a pedestrianised zone, but it remains open to buses and taxis.

Some 700 metres below Pulteney weir, the river is joined by the Kennet and Avon Canal which connects through Bath Locks. Together with the Kennet Navigation which joins the River Thames at Reading, this provides a through route for canal boats from Bristol to London. From this point downstream the river is known as the Avon Navigation.

=== Navigation ===
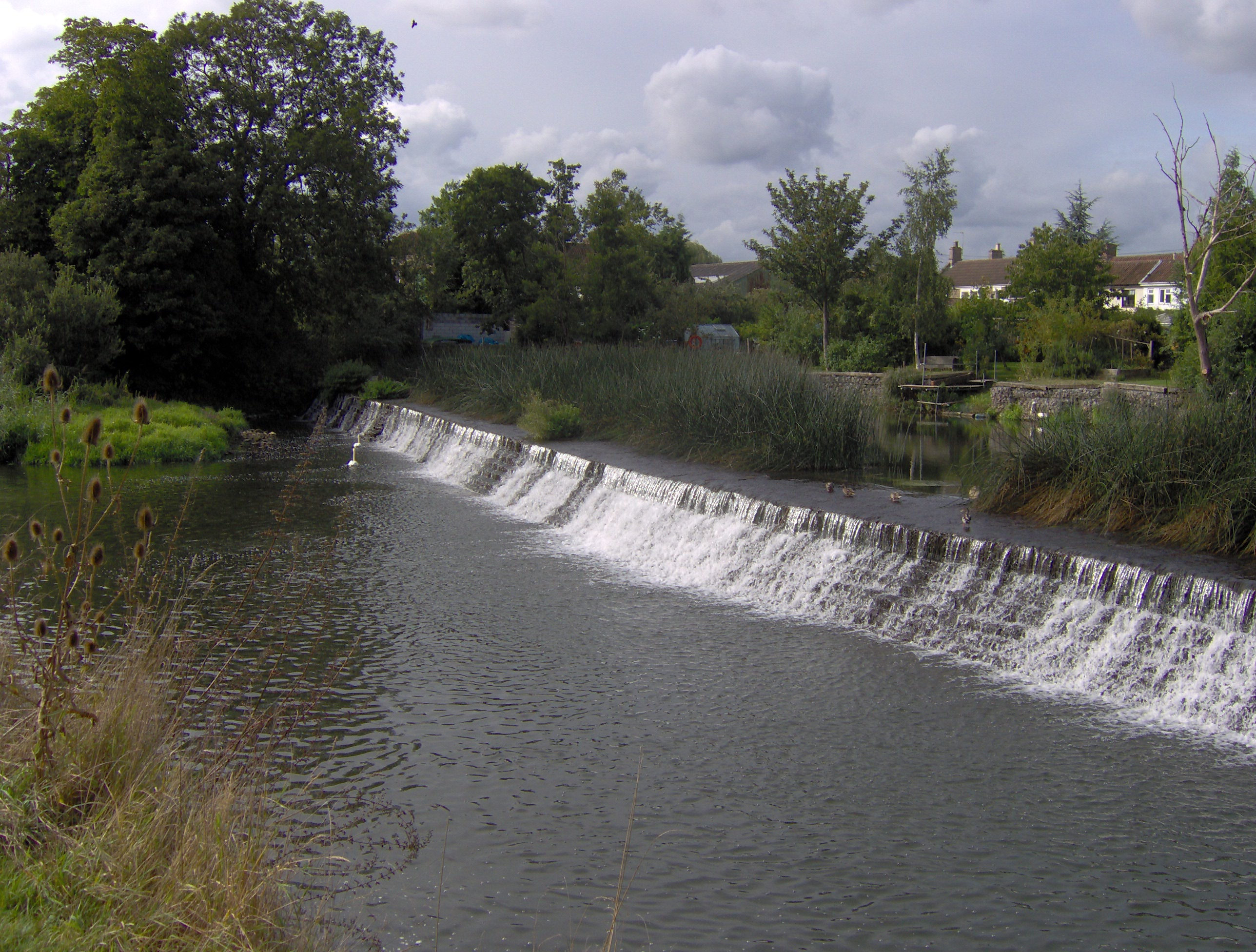
Weir at Swineford Lock

River Avon Navigation Act 1711
- Act of Parliament
- Parliament of Great Britain
- Long title: An Act for making the River Avon, in the Counties of Somerset and Gloucester, navigable, from the City of Bath, to or near Hanham's Mills.
- Citation: 10 Ann. c. 2 (Note: This is the citation in The Statutes of the Realm.); 10 Ann. c. 8 Pr. (Note: This is the citation in The Statutes at Large.)
- Territorial extent: Great Britain

Dates
- Royal assent: 22 May 1712
- Commencement: 7 December 1711 (Note: Start of session.)
Other legislation
Amended by	Avon River Horse Towing-path Act 1807

Status: Current legislation

Text of statute as originally enacted

The Avon above Bath remains navigable as far as Bathampton where there is the remains of a flash lock. The lock past the weir below Pulteney Bridge was demolished when the weir was reconstructed, so passage between the sections is only possible for dinghies and canoes using the roller slipway on the side of the weir.

Beyond its junction with the Kennet and Avon Canal, the Avon flows through Keynsham towards Bristol. For much of its course after leaving Wiltshire, it marks the traditional boundary between Somerset and Gloucestershire. For most of this distance the navigation makes use of the natural riverbed, with six locks overcoming a rise of 30 feet (9 m). From Bath to Netham Lock where it divides into the New Cut and the Floating Harbour is 12 miles (19 km). The stretch is made navigable by the use of locks and weirs.

In the centre of Bath it passes under bridges, including the Midland Bridge which was built by the Midland Railway Company to allow the Somerset and Dorset Joint Railway access to and from its Green Park terminus station. In November 2011, the navigation between Bath and Bristol was closed because of safety concerns about Victoria Bridge.

Weston Lock on the outskirts of Bath is in the Newbridge area. Weston Cut is a man made channel, opened in 1727, for boats to approach and pass through Weston Lock; the island created between the cut and the river weir became known as Dutch Island after the owner of the brass mill established on the riverside in the early 18th century.

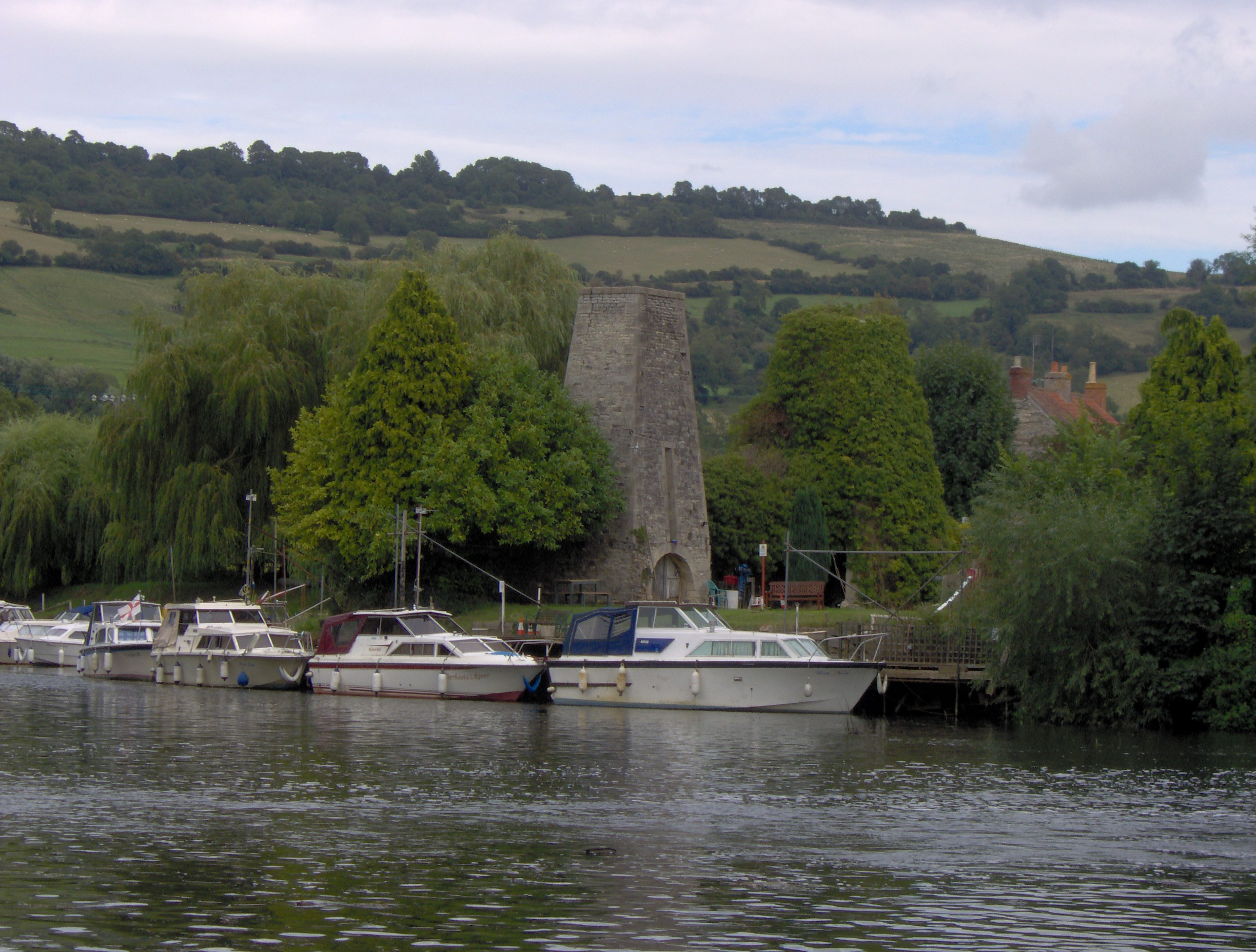
Kelston Brass Mill overlooking Saltford Lock

Kelston Lock and weir have permanent moorings above and below them. The Riverside Inn and Saltford Marina are also close by. Saltford Lock and weir are overlooked by the remains of the Kelston Brass Mill, which was working until 1925. It is a Grade II listed building. Alongside the lock is a pub, whose garden extends over the lock to the small island between the lock and weir. The lock was opened in 1727 and destroyed in 1738 by rival coal dealers to stop the use of the river for transportation.

In its heyday, between 1709 and 1859, Swineford had an active brass and copper industry around Swineford Lock, served by the river which also provided water power for the cloth industry, as did the River Boyd, a tributary which flows into the Avon near Bitton. Keynsham Lock opened in 1727. Just above the lock are visitor moorings and a pub, on an island between the lock and the weir. The weir side of the island is also the mouth of the River Chew.

The river is joined by the Siston Brook at Londonderry Wharf, terminus of the dramway which brought coal from Coalpit Heath. The final river lock, Hanham Lock, is on the edge of the Bristol built-up area; below here the river is affected by high tides which overtop Netham Weir. Above the weir, in the St Anne's area of Bristol, the river is joined by Brislington Brook.

Netham Lock is the point at Netham in Bristol at which boats from the Avon gain access to Bristol's floating harbour. Construction started in 1804 to build the tidal New Cut, where it is joined by the River Malago, and divert the Avon along the Feeder Canal to the harbour; a system designed and built by William Jessop and later improved by Isambard Kingdom Brunel. A weir carries the river into the New Cut and boats use the adjacent lock. Access to the harbour is only possible during the day, when the lock keeper will open the gates unless the water level in the river between Netham and Hanham is above or below the level of the harbour. Netham Lock and the weir form part of Bristol's flood defence mechanisms.

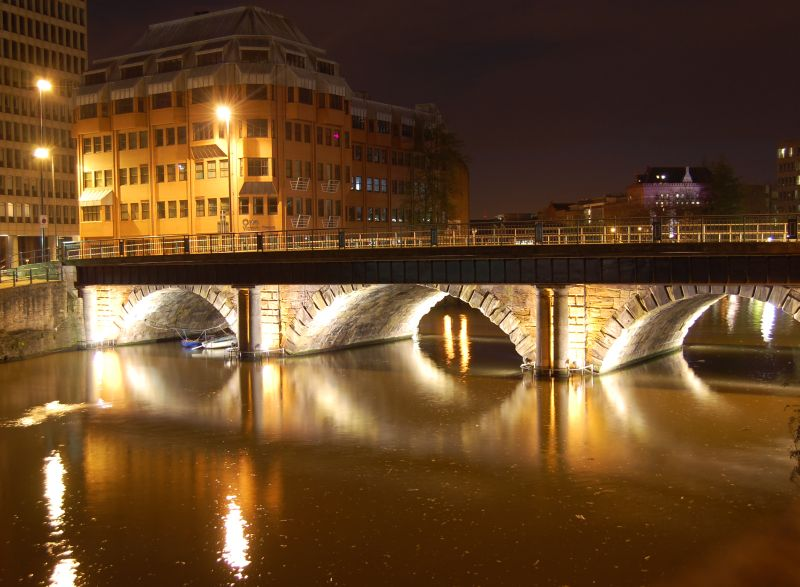
Bristol Bridge from Castle Park

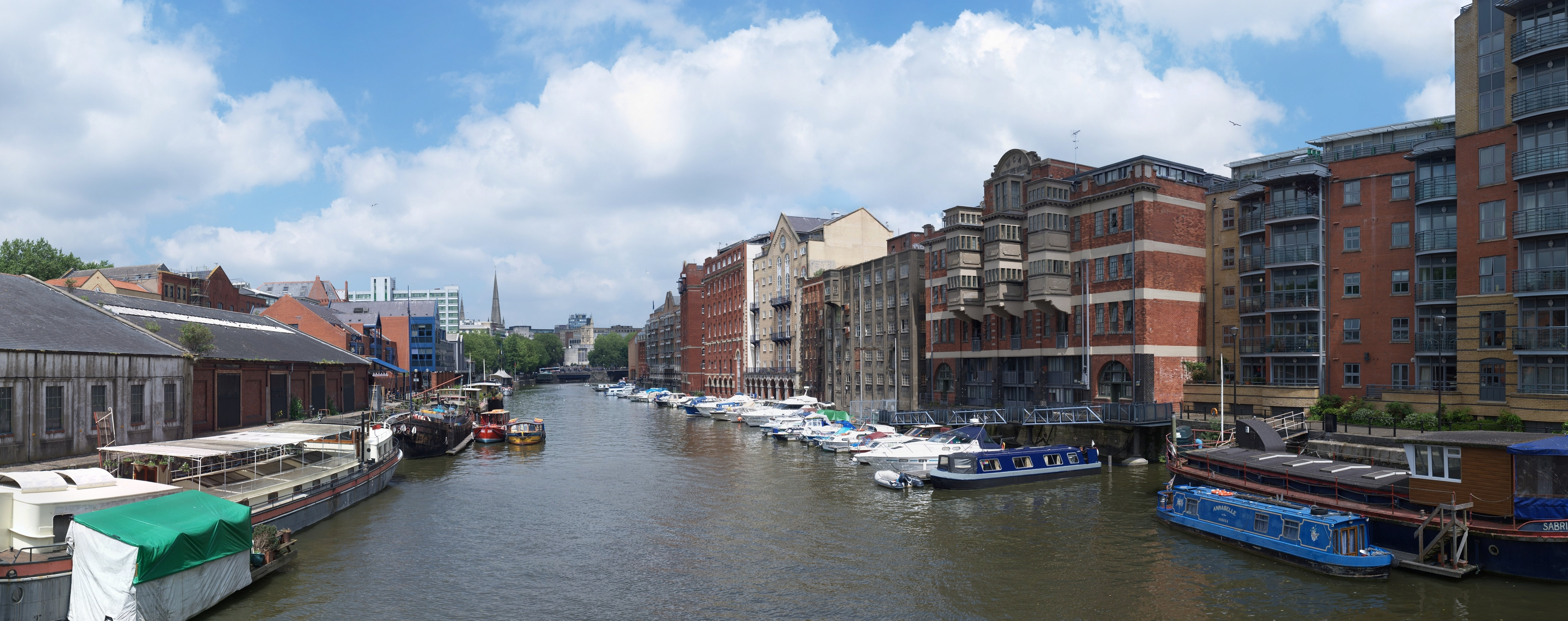
The River Avon in Bristol, looking towards Bristol Bridge with Welsh Back on the left. Boats of the Bristol Ferry Company are moored in the foreground, and the spires of St Nicholas, All Saints' and St Mary le Port churches can be seen in the distance.

In central Bristol, where the river is tidal, it is diverted from its original course into the New Cut, a channel dug between 1804 and 1809 at a cost of £600,000. The original course is held at a constant level by lock gates, designed by Jessop, and is known as the floating harbour, since it enables ships to stay afloat rather than grounding when the tide ebbs. The harbour is protected by an 1870s replacement for Jessop's locks.

This dock has a tentacled plan resulting from its origins as the natural river course of the Avon and its tributary, the River Frome, and is intimately entwined with Bristol's city centre as few docks are. As a result of this, the floating harbour is one of the more successful pieces of dockland regeneration, with much of the dockside now occupied by residential, office and cultural premises, and the water heavily used by leisure craft.

Downstream of central Bristol, the river passes through the deep Avon Gorge, spanned by Brunel's Clifton Suspension Bridge: the river is tidal and is navigable by seagoing vessels at high tide but dries to a steep-sided muddy channel at low tide. It was largely the challenge of navigating this section that sealed the fate of the floating harbour as commercial docks, and saw them replaced by docks at Avonmouth where the Avon joins the Severn Estuary.

Before reaching its mouth, the Avon is joined by the River Trym at Sea Mills which was the site of Portus Abonae, a Roman port. Shortly after, it passes the village of Pill on the south bank where the Pill Hobblers were based in order to tow ships up the river to Bristol and where yachts and other boats still have moorings in Chapel Pill and Crockerne Pill. It then passes under the Avonmouth Bridge which carries the M5 motorway. The main span is 538 ft (164 m) long, and the bridge is 4,554 ft (1,388 m) long, with an air draught above mean high water level of 98.4 ft (30 m).

The river then serves two major dock areas. The Royal Portbury Dock is on the southern side of the mouth of the river. The deepwater dock was constructed between 1972 and 1977, and is now a major port for the import of motor vehicles. The Royal Portbury Dock has the largest entrance lock into any UK port, accommodating vessels up to 41 m (135 ft) beam, 290 m (951 ft) length and 14.5 m (48 ft) draft.

The Avonmouth Docks are on the north side of the river and are one of the UK's major ports for chilled foods, especially fruit and vegetables. The first dock at Avonmouth, Avonmouth Old Dock, was opened in 1877 and acquired by Bristol Corporation in 1884. In 1907, a much larger dock, the Royal Edward Dock, was opened.

The docks form part of the Port of Bristol and were operated by the Port of Bristol Authority, part of Bristol City Council, until 1991 when the council granted a 150-year lease to the Bristol Port Company. Pilotage is provided by Bristol Pilots LLP who supply authorised pilots for the River Avon and Bristol City docks, as well as the Severn estuary and the Bristol channel; they are based at Avonmouth Docks.

== Hydrology and water quality ==
At Great Somerford the Avon has a mean flow rate of 3.355 cubic metres per second (118.5 cu ft/s), and a typical river level range between 0.16 metres (6.3 in) and 0.74 metres (2 ft 5 in) with a highest level of 2.43 metres (8 ft 0 in). At Melksham the Avon has a mean flow rate of 6.703 cubic metres per second (236.7 cu ft/s).

December 2013 was the highest level recorded at Bradford on Avon when the level reached 3.42 metres (11.2 ft) with a normal range at the monitoring station being 1.01 metres (3 ft 4 in) to 1.40 metres (4 ft 7 in). At Bathford the highest river level was also in December 2013 when it reached 4.41 metres (14.5 ft) while the normal range is 0.75 metres (2 ft 6 in) and 1.60 metres (5 ft 3 in), with a flow rate of 18.274 cubic metres per second (645.3 cu ft/s).

In Bath at St James, which is 180 metres (590 ft) upstream of Pultney Weir the mean flow is 20.466 cubic metres per second (722.7 cu ft/s), with a similar flow (20.984 cubic metres per second (741.0 cu ft/s)) downstream of the weir. At the Destructor Bridge in Bath the typical height range is 0.40 metres (1 ft 4 in) to 0.81 metres (2 ft 8 in) with a high of 1.64 metres (5 ft 5 in) also in December 2013.

At Saltford, the range is 0.46 metres (1 ft 6 in) to 1.41 metres (4 ft 8 in), with a highest recording of 2.31 metres (7 ft 7 in) on 24 December 2013. At Keynsham, the typical range is between 0.23 metres (9.1 in) and 2.09 metres (6 ft 10 in); the highest was on 25 December 2013 when it reached 5.36 metres (17.6 ft). At Netham Weir, where the New Cut carries the flow away from Bristol Harbour, the typical range for the depth of the river is 0.15 metres (5.9 in) to 0.84 metres (2 ft 9 in), with the highest ever recorded being 3.22 metres (10.6 ft).

For the purpose of water quality monitoring and improvement, the river is divided into several catchment management areas; South of Malmesbury, Bristol Avon Rural and Bristol Avon Urban. In the rural area, 22 water bodies are classified as good, 46 as moderate and 8 as poor. The main reasons for not achieving good scores are pollution from waste water, agriculture and rural land management. In the urban area, one water body is rated good, while 12 are rated moderate and one is poor. The pollution from upstream is added to by the effects of industry, manufacturing and other businesses and is significantly affected by physical modifications to the water course. Within the catchment area there are 137 river water bodies and 6 lakes; of these 22 per cent of rivers are rated as good ecological status, 40 per cent good for chemical status and 31 per cent good for biological status.

== Conservation areas ==
The river is important for its dragonfly communities, with a strong population of scarce chaser (found in only six other areas in England), together with a strong population of white-legged damselfly. red-eyed damselfly is also found. The river is also important for aquatic plants, including Loddon pondweed.

The Kellaways – West Tytherton Site of Special Scientific Interest, 3 miles (4.8 km) north east of Chippenham, is of geological interest as the river bank exposes Callovian highly-fossiliferous sandstone which contains well-preserved bivalves, gastropods, brachiopods, belemnites and ammonites. Further downstream at Newton St Loe the Newton St Loe SSSI is another Geological Conservation Review SSSI. It represents the only remaining known exposure of fossiliferous Pleistocene gravels along the River Avon. In conjunction with other sites within the wider area, it has aided the development of a scientific understanding of the history of early glaciation within South West England. The bodies of mammoths (Mammuthus) and horses (Equus) have been found at the site.

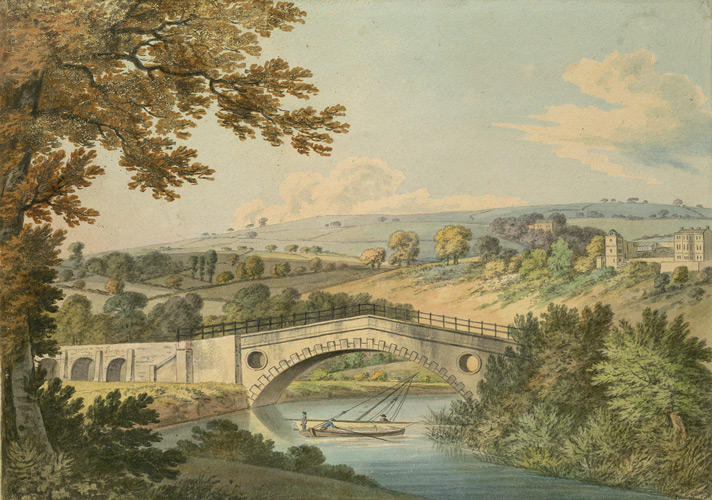
New Bridge, Bath close to the Newton St Loe SSSI, painted in 1806

The Avon Gorge has been designated as a Site of Special Scientific Interest because it supports some rare fauna and flora, including species unique to the gorge. There are a total of 24 rare plant species and two unique trees: the Bristol and Wilmotts's whitebeams. Other notable plants include Bristol rock-cress, Bristol onion, spiked speedwell, autumn squill and honewort.

Other areas along the river which have this designation include Bickley Wood, Cleeve Wood, Hanham for its large population of Bath asparagus (Ornithogalum pyrenaicum). Stidham Farm near Keynsham contains at least At least 2 metres (7 ft) of Pleistocene terrace-gravels, consisting of limestone clasts mainly, but also with Millstone Grit, Pennant Sandstone, flint and chert clasts. The site is of considerable importance for studies relating to the possible glaciation of the area, and of the terrace stratigraphy, particularly as it is one of only two accessible terrace deposits in this part of the Avon valley.

Newton St Loe SSSI is also listed for geological reasons as it represents the only remaining known exposure of fossiliferous Pleistocene gravels along the River Avon. In conjunction with other sites within the wider area, they have aided the development of a scientific understanding of the history of early glaciation within South West England.

At Horseshoe Bend, Shirehampton the wooded cliff and a narrow salt marsh are supported by rocks of Devonian age Old Red Sandstone and Carboniferous Limestone, overlain by with Triassic dolomitic conglomerate. The site's principal interest and the reason for its designation as an SSSI is the presence of a population of the true service-tree (Sorbus domestica) growing on the cliffs. This tree is nationally rare in Britain, and this site hosts the largest known population in England. Other notable species of Sorbus here are the whitebeams Sorbus eminens and Sorbus anglica, both of which are also nationally rare in Britain.

The nationally scarce large-leaved lime (Tilia platyphyllos) also occurs, and herbs include field garlic (Allium oleraceum) and pale St. John's-wort (Hypericum montanum). The saltmarsh vegetation, which lies at the base of the cliff, is predominantly made up of sea aster (Aster tripolium) and English scurvygrass (Cochlearia anglica). There are two nationally scarce vascular plant species here as well – slender hare's-ear (Bupleurum tenuissimum) and long-stalked orache (Atriplex longipes).

The tidal reaches of the River Avon provide habitat for waterbirds, with 64 species having been recorded up to 2004, including 21 species of shorebird, and 13 species of gull.

== Authorities ==
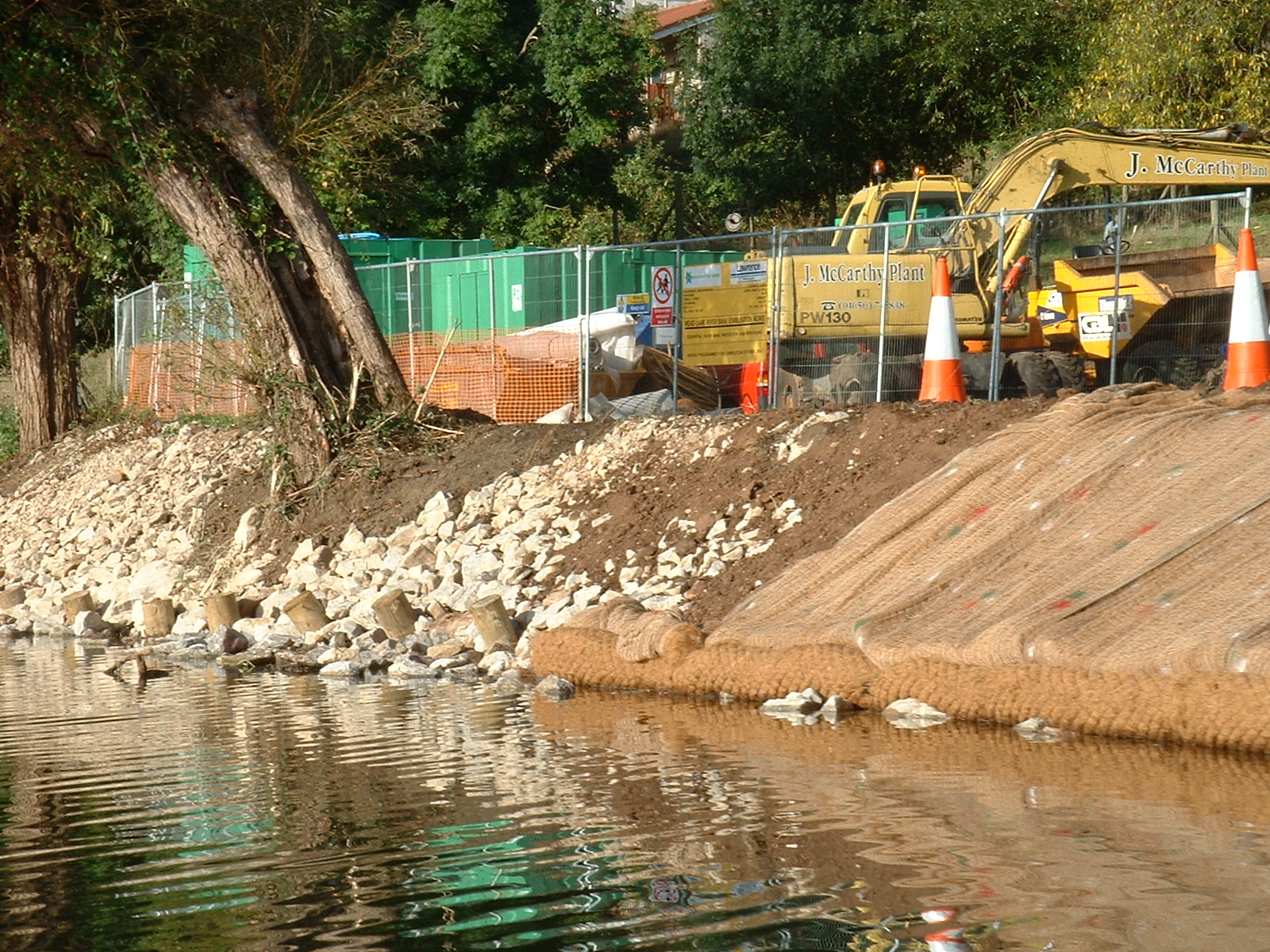
Bank repair carried out by British Waterways in Saltford in 2005

A catchment board for the Avon was created by the Land Drainage Act 1930 and became the Bristol Avon River Board under the River Boards Act 1948. The board was replaced by the Bristol Avon River Authority under the Water Resources Act 1963. Twenty-five minor watercourses were added to the Authority's jurisdiction in 1973.

Reorganisation in 1974, under the Water Act 1973 brought the Avon catchment into a new regional body, the Wessex Water Authority. Privatisation saw responsibility for the catchment pass to the National Rivers Authority upon its formation in September 1989. In 1996, the authority became part of the Environment Agency.

Navigation conservancy in the lower river from Avonmouth to the lock at Hotwells is the responsibility of The Bristol Port Company as both statutory and competent harbour authority. Navigation within Bristol's floating harbour is retained by Bristol City Council as statutory and competent harbour authority.

In July 2012, responsibility for maintenance of the river navigation above Bristol passed from British Waterways to the Canal & River Trust.

== History ==
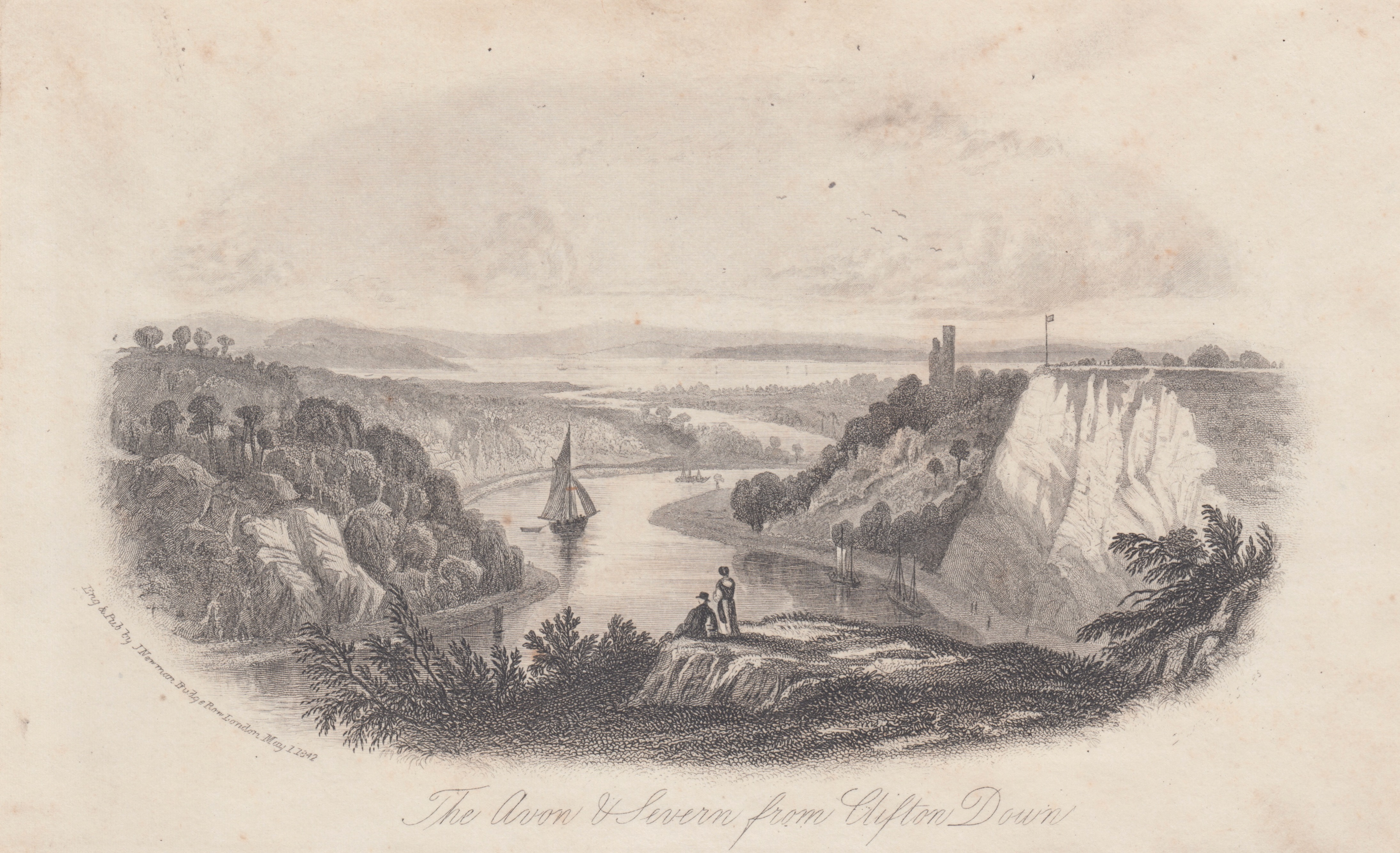
The Avon to the Severn from Clifton Down, 1842

The distribution of archaeological finds suggests that the western end of the river between Bath and Avonmouth formed a border between the Dobunni and Durotriges during the late Iron Age, prior to the Roman conquest of Britain. Further east, between Bath and what is now Wiltshire, it may also have formed a border of the territory ruled by the Belgae. After the Roman occupation, the river formed a boundary between the lands of the Hwicce, which became Mercia, and the kingdom of Wessex.

The river Avon had been navigable from Bristol to Bath during the early years of the 13th century but construction of mills on the river forced its closure. The floodplain of the Avon, on which the city centre of Bath is built, has an altitude of about 59 ft (18 m) above sea level. The river, once an unnavigable series of braided streams broken up by swamps and ponds, has been managed by weirs into a single channel. Periodic flooding, which shortened the life of many buildings in the lowest part of the city, was normal until major flood control works were completed in the 1970s.

The Bristol Avon Navigation, which runs the 15 miles (24 km) from the Kennet and Avon Canal at Hanham Lock to the Bristol Channel at Avonmouth, was constructed between 1724 and 1727, following legislation passed by Queen Anne, by a company of proprietors and the engineer John Hore of Newbury. The first cargo of 'Deal boards, Pig-Lead and Meal' arrived in Bath in December 1727. It is now administered by the Canal & River Trust.

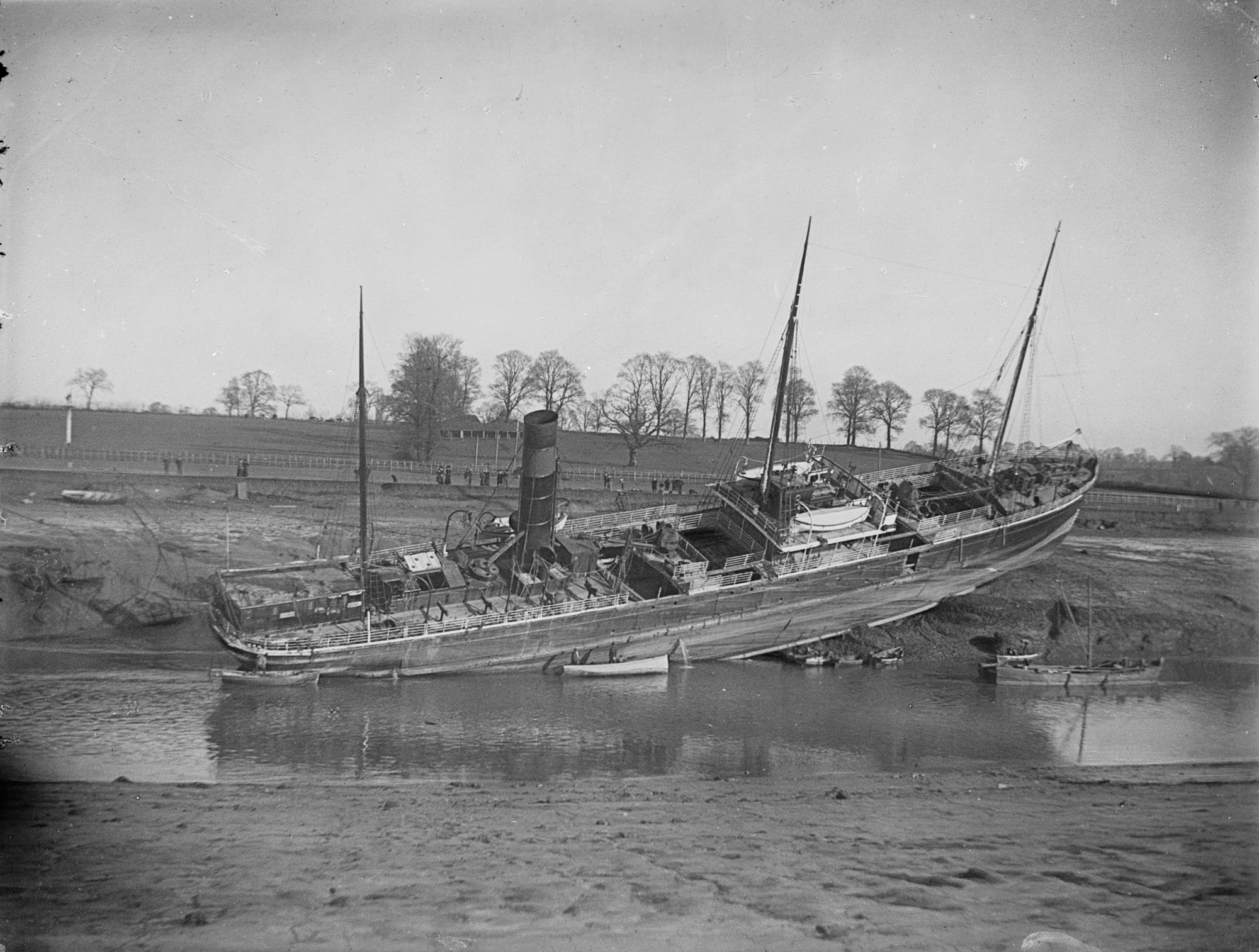
S.S. Dunbrody stranded in the 1890s owing to the high tidal range

Throughout Bristol's history the Avon Gorge has been an important transport route, carrying the River Avon, major roads and two railways. The Bristol Channel has a very high tidal range of 15 metres (49 ft), second only to Bay of Fundy in Eastern Canada; and the gorge is relatively narrow and meandering, making it notoriously difficult to navigate. Several vessels have grounded in the gorge including the SS Demerara soon after her launch in 1851, the schooner Gipsy in 1878, the steam tug Black Eagle in 1861 and the Llandaff City.

In 1877, Halfpenny Bridge, a pedestrian toll bridge crossing the river from Bath Spa railway station to Widcombe, collapsed with the loss of about 10 lives amongst a large crowd going to the Bath and West Agricultural show.

The Avon has flooded several times in its recorded history. These floods include the one in 1799/1800 damaging Pulteney Bridge. Various points along the river including the valley around Freshford are at risk of fluvial flooding, as a result of sediment entering the river and narrowing the channel. To help cope with this some areas on the banks of the river are designated as a functional floodplain to cope with increased flow volumes.

Potential changes to weather patterns from climate change suggest that further measures are likely to be needed to protect the population from flooding risk. A tidal surge, combined with high water levels from the flooding of the surrounding area caused flooding in the city of Bristol.

== Route and points of interest ==
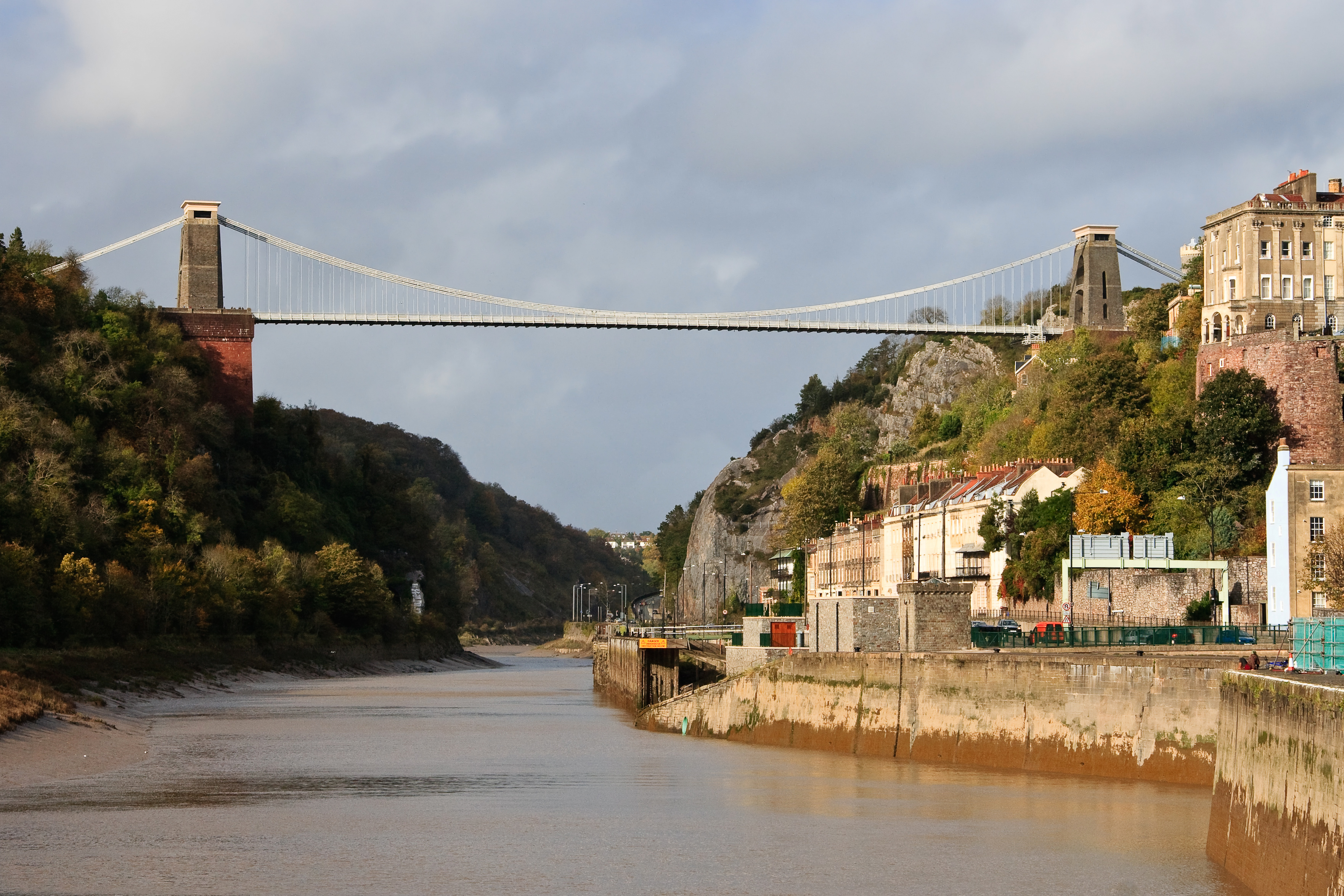
The Avon Gorge and the Clifton Suspension Bridge

Point	Coordinates (Links to map resources)	OS Grid Ref	Notes
Source	51.587°N 2.255°W	ST811813	Didmarton
Sherston	51.573°N 2.213°W	ST853860	Sherston
Tetbury Avon confluence	51.582°N 2.092°W	ST936870	Malmesbury
M4 Motorway	51.514°N 2.074°W	ST949795	M4 Bridge
River Marden confluence	51.466°N 2.094°W	ST935741	Dauntsey Vale
Chippenham	51.459°N 2.117°W	ST919733	Chippenham
National Trust village	51.412°N 2.119°W	ST917682	Lacock
Melksham	51.374°N 2.139°W	ST904638	Melksham
Norman bridge	51.347°N 2.252°W	ST825609	Bradford on Avon
Avoncliff Aqueduct	51.338°N 2.282°W	ST804599	Avoncliff
River Frome, Somerset confluence	51.357°N 2.310°W	ST784620	Freshford
Dundas Aqueduct	51.362°N 2.311°W	ST783626	Dundas Aqueduct
Claverton Pumping Station	51.378°N 2.303°W	ST790644	Claverton
Bathford bridge & Bybrook River confluence	51.401°N 2.308°W	ST786669	Bathford
Toll bridge	51.396°N 2.321°W	ST777664	Bathampton
Cleveland Bridge	51.389°N 2.357°W	ST752657	Cleveland Bridge
Pulteney Bridge and weir	51.383°N 2.359°W	ST751650	Pulteney Bridge
Kennet and Avon Canal confluence	51.377°N 2.353°W	ST755643	Bath Locks
Weston Lock	51.383°N 2.398°W	ST723649	Newbridge
Kelston Lock	51.401°N 2.450°W	ST687669	Kelston
Brass Mill at Saltford Lock	51.410°N 2.444°W	ST691679	Saltford
Swineford Lock	51.418°N 2.446°W	ST691689	Swineford
Keynsham Lock & River Chew confluence	51.420°N 2.493°W	ST657691	Keynsham
Hanham Lock	51.428°N 2.511°W	ST645700	Hanham
Brislington Brook confluence	51.454°N 2.542°W	ST623729	Brislington
Start of new Cut and Floating Harbour	51.451°N 2.552°W	ST617726	Netham Lock
Bristol Harbour	51.447°N 2.601°W	ST582722	Bristol
Clifton Suspension Bridge	51.455°N 2.629°W	ST563731	Avon Gorge
River Trym confluence	51.480°N 2.652°W	ST548759	Sea Mills
Avonmouth Bridge	51.489°N 2.694°W	ST519769	Avonmouth Bridge
Mouth	51.503°N 2.700°W	ST515785	Royal Portbury Dock and Avonmouth Docks at Avonmouth

== See also ==
- Other Rivers Avon
- List of rivers of the United Kingdom
