= Peter Hay =

Peter Hay may refer to:

- Peter Háy (born 1944), Canadian writer
- Peter Grant Hay (1879–1961), Australian brewer and racehorse breeder
- Peter Thomas Hay (1932–2018), authority on British steam railways
- Peter Alexander Hay (1866–1952), Scottish watercolourist
- Peter Seton Hay (1853–1907), New Zealand civil engineer and public servant
- Peter Hay (sailor), represented Australia in the Dragon World Championships
- Peter Hay (artist) (1951–2003), British artist and publisher, founder of Two Rivers Press

== See also ==
- Peter Hayes (disambiguation)
