= Conham =

Suburb of Bristol, England

Coordinates: 51.44°N 02.53°W

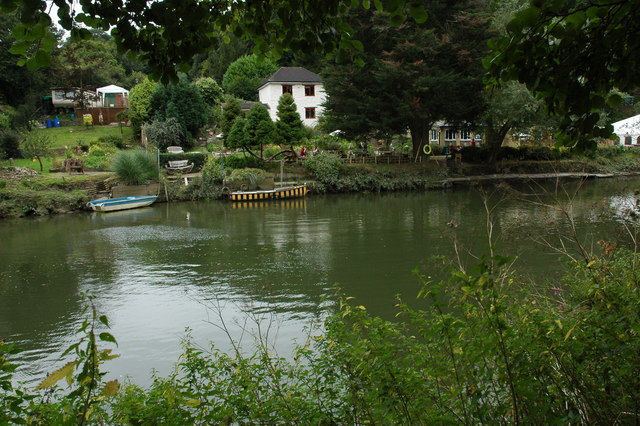
- Conham Ferry

- Location within Gloucestershire
- OS grid reference: ST6372
- Unitary authority: South Gloucestershire
- Ceremonial county: Gloucestershire
- Region: South West
- Country: England
- Sovereign state: United Kingdom
- Police: Avon and Somerset
- Fire: Avon
- Ambulance: South Western
- UK Parliament: North East Somerset and Hanham

Conham is an area of South Gloucestershire in England. It lies near Hanham on the north bank of the River Avon just outside the city boundaries of Bristol.

The Conham Ferry is a small passenger ferry which operates across the river from Conham to Broomhill.

The Conham River Park lies in a loop of the River Avon, and forms part of the Avon Valley Woodlands.
