= Peter Hayes (sculptor) =

Peter Hayes (born 1946) is a contemporary sculptor now based in Bath, England, whose work is displayed in public locations including the UK, US, Canada and Belgium.

== Life and works ==
Hayes was born in Birmingham, England, where, aged 12, he was selected to attend the Moseley School of Art. In 1961 he left to study at the Birmingham College of Art before travelling extensively in Africa. Over the course of several years, he worked as a ceramic artist with tribes and village potters who inspired him with the exquisite work they produced using very limited technology and tools. Moving on to India, Nepal, Japan, Korea and New Mexico, he found similar skills and adopted the techniques he learned. In 1982, Hayes came home and built a studio in a disused toll house on Cleveland Bridge, Bath. His work now builds on the techniques and methods he learned during his travels to create ceramic art that is often inspired by memories of landscapes he has seen.

The distinctive appearance of Peter Hayes’ ceramic works is partly a result of techniques such as Raku firing he employs but also reflects his habit of submerging pieces in the flowing river beside his studio, or sending them to Cornwall to be washed in the sea, for months at a time. The water washes minerals such as copper and metal oxides into the basic white clay with which Hayes works, creating a characteristic green-blue "blush" in his sculptures along with random elements that make every piece unique. The effect is to create objects that many feel look ancient and perhaps even a little alien. Hayes' work is generally finished by waxing and polishing.

== Collections including sculpture by Peter Hayes ==
- National Gallery of Scotland, Edinburgh
- Museum of Modern Art, Kingston, Jamaica
- Gardiner Museum, Toronto, Canada
- Museum of Modern Art, Brussels, Belgium
- Silber Collection, California
- Speed Art Museum, Louisville, Kentucky

== Commissions visible in public ==
- Four Standing Stones - Lansdowne House, Berkeley Square, Stanhope Properties (1993)
- Pylons - Broadgate, London, Skidmore, Owings & Merril (1993)
- Mounted Stones with Gold Circle - 100, Ludgate Hill, London, Skidmore, Owings & Merril (1994)
- Four Figures - Taipai, Taiwan bank (1998)

== Sources ==
- New York Magazine - 23 Oct 1995 - Page 94
- Working with clay - Susan Peterson, Jan Peterson - 2002 - Page 64
- The craft and art of clay: a complete potter's handbook - Susan Peterson, Jan Peterson - 2003 - Page 322
