= Henry Goodridge =

English architect

Henry Edmund Goodridge (1797, Bath – 26 October 1864) was an English architect based in Bath. He worked from the early 1820s until the 1850s, using Classical, Italianate and Gothic styles.

== Life ==
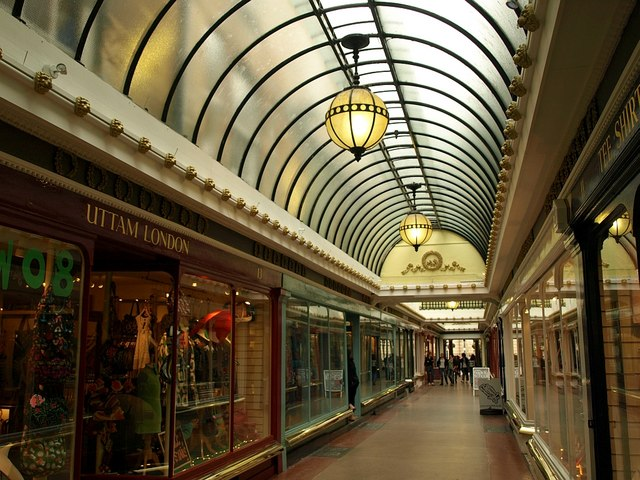
The Corridor in Bath (1825)

He was born in Bath in 1797, the son of James Goodridge, who was at that time engaged in large speculative building projects in connection with the management of the estate of Sir William Pulteney, at Bathwick. On the advice of Thomas Telford, his father had him articled to John Lowder, then the City Architect for Bath.

Having set up his own practice, his early work consisted mostly of alterations, laying out blocks for building, and designing villas. He converted the Old Orchard Street Theatre into a Catholic church. His first important work was the enlargement of the Roman Catholic Downside College, (1821-3) near Bath, parts of which were praised by Pugin. His work there included the vaulted Gothic chapel, which was originally heavily pinnacled. In 1824 he built Christ Church at Rode Hill, also in Gothic style, and the next year he acted both as developer and architect on the "Corridor" in Bath.

In 1827 he finished the Cleveland Bridge over the Avon in Bath, a cast iron structure with Doric lodges. He later built the Public Dispensary nearby, using the Ionic order. In 1829 he visited Italy, where he sketched buildings assiduously.

In 1834 he made a grand design for a church in connection with the Roman Catholic College at Prior Park. It was never carried out, and a chapel on a smaller scale was later built by J.J. Scoles. Goodridge did, however, build the grand processional stairway at the north-facing front of the mansion, and also made some internal alterations which were obliterated by fire in 1836.

He designed the tower at Lansdown for William Beckford, who had recently sold Fonthill Abbey, and had moved to a house in Lansdown Crescent in Bath. Beckford obtained designs from several London and Bath architects, including Goodridge, who was chosen after some prevarication. New designs were drawn up, and the tower completed up to the level of the block cornice in 28 working days. It was intended to be roofed at this point, but Beckford decided it should be increased in height with a belvedere, and then decided on an additional lantern. According to a brief biography of Goodridge, written by his son:

In style [the tower] may be termed Greco-Italian, a style Goodridge greatly adopted, as he considered therein the purity of the Greek and the freedom of the Romanesque were best combined.

After Beckford's death, the tower and grounds became a cemetery, for which Goodridge designed a gateway and wing walls in a Byzantine style.

At around this time he was employed by Beckford's son-in-law, the Duke of Hamilton, at Hamilton Palace, in the finishing of the grand staircase and hall and in building the Beckford library there. He also made a design for a mausoleum, which was originally intended to be built adjoining the palace. The Duke, however, changed his mind, and decided to build it some distance away in the park. Goodridge made several designs for the new situation, but his client thought them too extravagant, and Goodridge only built the burial vaults of the new structure, the chapel above being entrusted to another architect.

He entered the competition to design the new Houses of Parliament but was unsuccessful; however, he was appointed to the committee to choose designs for the decoration of Parliament when an exhibition was held for the purpose at Westminster Hall.

During the construction of the Great Western Railway through Bath, his services were secured by Brunel to purchase the land and settle the various claims. During part of his career he did a great deal of this kind of work.

His last works before his retirement were the alteration and enlargement of Ecclesgreig, Kincardineshire, for Forsyth Grant, and the Percy Chapel, Bath (1854), another Byzantine design, on which he worked with his son, A. S. Goodridge.

Harvey Lonsdale Elmes and W.H. Campbell were his pupils.

== Personal life ==
Goodridge maintained a financial interest in The Corridor and, a few years after the death of his widow, his will led to a family dispute which had to be resolved by the Chancery Court.

He was buried in Lansdown Cemetery, which surrounds Beckford's Tower.

== Works ==
Goodridge's buildings in Bath include:

- The Corridor, one of the earliest shopping arcades (1824).
- Cleveland Bridge (1827).
- Holy Trinity Church, Combe Down (1832–5) - before enlargements.
- Beckford's Tower, commissioned by William Beckford and now owned by the Bath Preservation Trust and operated as a museum.
- The Byzantine gateway to the cemetery adjacent to Beckford's Tower in which William Beckford's sarcophagus stands.
- Several Italianate villas on Bathwick Hill including his own house, Bathwick Grange, which was formerly known as Montebello, and 23 Bathwick Hill.
- Work at Prior Park, including the processional stairway.
- Henley Lodge, Weston Road for H R Ricardo (1822-1860), nephew of David Ricardo

His designs outside Bath include:

- Downside School, Somerset, including its Old Chapel (1820–1823)
- The east lodge at Downside Abbey (1827)
- Roman Catholic church, Lyme Regis, Dorset
- Restoration of Malmesbury Abbey, Wiltshire, consisting of clearing away the obstructions inside, repewing, and adding the west window
- Admiral Hood Monument, Butleigh, Somerset (1831)
- Devizes Castle, Wiltshire (1840)
- The library of Hamilton Palace, South Lanarkshire (1845)

== Sources ==
- H.M. Colvin, A Biographical Dictionary of British Architects, 1600-1840 (1997) ISBN 0-300-07207-4
- Little, Bryan (1947). The Building of Bath. London: Collins.
