= Tetbury Avon =

River in Gloucestershire and Wiltshire, England

Tetbury Avon Little Avon
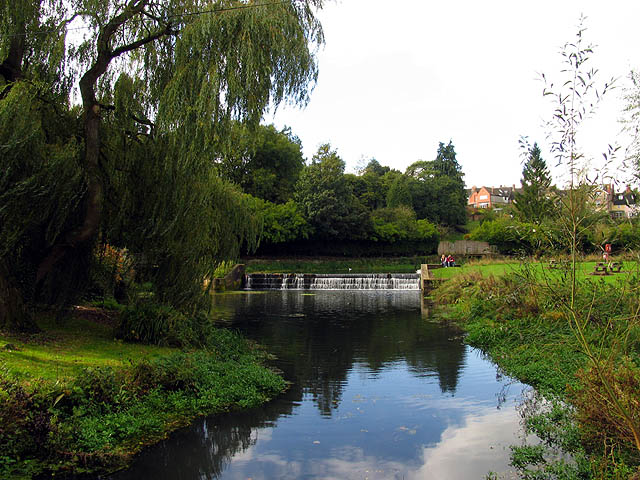
- Tetbury Avon near Malmesbury
- Etymology: Welsh afon - river
- Native name: Ingleburn (Old English)

Location
- Country: England
- Region: West of England
- District: Gloucestershire, Wiltshire
- City: Tetbury, Malmesbury

Physical characteristics
- Source: Wor Well
  - location: Tetbury, Gloucestershire, England
  - coordinates: 51.6432°N 2.1424°W
  - elevation: 375 ft (114 m)
- Mouth: Bristol Avon
  - location: Malmesbury, Wiltshire, England
  - coordinates: 51.5821°N 2.09289°W
  - elevation: 230 ft (70 m)
- Length: 7 mi (11 km), south easterly
- Basin size: 28.5 mi^{2} (74 km^{2})
- Discharge
  - average: 24.4 cu ft/s (0.69 m^{3}/s)
  - minimum: 1 cu ft/s (0.028 m^{3}/s)
  - maximum: 141 cu ft/s (4.0 m^{3}/s)

Basin features
- Tributaries
  - right: Cutwell Brook, Wormwell Brook
- River system: Bristol Avon

The Tetbury Avon, also known as the River Avon (Tetbury Branch), Little Avon or Ingleburn (Anglo-Saxon – English river), is a tributary of the Bristol Avon in south-west England. It rises at Tetbury in Gloucestershire and flows in a generally south-easterly direction, joining the Sherston Avon at Malmesbury in Wiltshire. The water flow has been reduced by public water extraction from its source aquifer in the Cotswold Hills. In the past watermills were used for fulling wool and grinding corn; one working mill survives.

== Course ==
The Tetbury Avon rises at Wor Well to the north east of Tetbury in the Cotswold Hills. It flows first in a southerly direction, joined on the right bank by the Cutwell Brook at the southeast of the town. The river now turns in the southeasterly direction into a steep valley through Estcourt Park, where it is joined on the right by the Wormwell Brook, which has its origin at Westonbirt. Passing through Shipton Wood the river forms a lake, created as part of the Estcourt Estate in the late 18th century. It then enters Wiltshire near the village of Brokenborough, flowing to the north of Malmesbury where it joins the Sherston Avon at the eastern edge of the town.

== History ==
As is common amongst Cotswold streams, many watermills were established from early times for fulling wool and grinding corn. Shipton Mill in the wood of the same name still produces organic wheat and rye flours. A mill at this site was recorded in the Domesday Book in 1086.

== Natural history ==
A population of white-clawed crayfish in the Tetbury Avon has been eradicated by fungi hosted by the invasive North American signal crayfish.

== Hydrology ==
The Environment Agency has a gauging station at Brokenborough and reports a mean flow of 24.4 cubic feet per second (0.69 m^{3}/s) with a maximum of 141 cubic feet per second (4.0 m^{3}/s) and a minimum of 1 cubic foot per second (0.028 m^{3}/s). It is believed that abstraction of public water supplies from the Great Oolite aquifer of the Cotswolds has reduced flows in the Tetbury Avon, making it difficult to maintain high water quality and having a negative effect on the ecology.
