= List of family seats of English nobility =

This is an incomplete index of the current and historical principal family seats of English royal, titled and landed gentry families. Some of these seats are no longer occupied by the families with which they are associated, and some are ruinous – e.g. Lowther Castle.

== Seats of current members of the British royal family ==
Primary title	Principal Seat
The King	Buckingham Palace, London; Windsor Castle, Berkshire
Prince of Wales	Forest Lodge, Windsor
Duke of Edinburgh	Bagshot Park, Surrey
The Princess Royal	Gatcombe Park, Gloucestershire
Duke of Gloucester	Kensington Palace, London
Duke of Kent	Kensington Palace, London
Prince Michael of Kent	Kensington Palace, London
Princess Alexandra, The Hon. Lady Ogilvy	Thatched House Lodge, London

== Family seats of British peers ==
=== Dukes (other than royal dukes) ===
Primary title	Family seat	Former seats
Duke of Norfolk	Arundel Castle, Sussex and Carlton Towers, Yorkshire	Framlingham Castle, Bungay Castle, Clun Castle, Norfolk House, Worksop Manor
Duke of Somerset	Maiden Bradley, Wiltshire and Berry Pomeroy Castle, Devon	Bulstrode Park
Duke of Richmond	Goodwood House, Sussex	Gordon Castle, Richmond House
Duke of Grafton	Euston Hall, Suffolk	
Duke of St Albans		Bestwood Lodge
Duke of Beaufort	Badminton House, Gloucestershire	Raglan Castle
Duke of Bedford	Woburn Abbey, Bedfordshire	
Duke of Devonshire	Chatsworth House, Derbyshire, Bolton Abbey, Yorkshire, and Lismore Castle, County Waterford	Londesborough Hall, Hardwick Hall, Chiswick House, Devonshire House, Burlington House
Duke of Marlborough	Blenheim Palace, Oxfordshire	Marlborough House
Duke of Rutland	Belvoir Castle, Leicestershire and Haddon Hall, Derbyshire	
Duke of Manchester		Kimbolton Castle, Tandragee Castle
Duke of Northumberland	Alnwick Castle, Northumberland and Syon House, London	Warkworth Castle, Prudhoe Castle, Kielder Castle, Northumberland House, Stanwick Park, Albury Park
Duke of Wellington	Stratfield Saye House, Hampshire and Apsley House, London	
Duke of Westminster	Eaton Hall, Cheshire and Abbeystead House, Lancashire	Grosvenor House

=== Marquesses ===
Primary title	Family seat	Former seats
Marquess of Winchester		Basing House
Marquess of Lansdowne	Bowood House, Wiltshire	Lansdowne House
Marquess Townshend	Raynham Hall, Norfolk	
Marquess of Salisbury	Hatfield House, Hertfordshire and Cranborne Manor, Dorset	
Marquess of Bath	Longleat House, Wiltshire	
Marquess of Hertford	Ragley Hall, Warwickshire	Dorchester House, Hertford House
Marquess of Exeter	Burghley House, near Stamford, Lincolnshire	
Marquess of Northampton	Castle Ashby, Northamptonshire and Compton Wynyates, Warwickshire	
Marquess of Rockingham		Rockingham Castle, Wentworth Woodhouse, South Yorkshire
Marquess Camden	Wherwell House, Hampshire	Bayham Abbey Estate, near Lamberhurst
Marquess of Cholmondeley	Houghton Hall, Norfolk and Cholmondeley Castle, Cheshire	
Marquess of Ailesbury		Tottenham House
Marquess of Bristol		Ickworth House
Marquess of Normanby	Mulgrave Castle, Yorkshire	
Marquess of Abergavenny	Eridge Park, Sussex	
Marquess of Zetland	Aske Hall, Yorkshire	
Marquess of Reading		Jaynes Court, near Bisley, Gloucestershire

=== Earls ===
Primary title	Family seat	Former seats
Earl of Aylesford	Packington Hall, Warwickshire	
Earl Baldwin of Bewdley	Manor Farm House, Oxfordshire	Astley Hall
Earl of Balfour	Burpham Lodge, Sussex	Whittingehame House
Earl Bathurst	Cirencester House, Gloucestershire	Paulspury, Northamptonshire
Earl of Bradford	Weston Park, Shropshire	Castle Bromwich Hall
Earl of Buckinghamshire		Hampden House
Earl Cadogan		Culford Park
Earl Cairns	Bolehyde Manor, Wiltshire	
Earl of Carlisle	Naworth Castle, Cumberland and Castle Howard, Yorkshire	
Earl of Carnarvon	Highclere Castle, Hampshire	
Earl Cathcart	Gateley Hall, Norfolk	
Earl of Chichester	Little Durnford Manor, Wiltshire	Stanmer House
Earl of Clarendon	Holywell House, Hampshire	The Grove
Earl of Cottenham	Priory Manor, Wiltshire	
Earl of Coventry		Croome Court
Earl of Cranbrook	Great Glemham House, Suffolk	
Earl of Craven	Hawkwood House, Sussex	Hamstead Marshall Park, Ashdown Park, Coombe Abbey
Earl of Cromer	Drayton Court, Somerset	
Earl of Dartmouth	Woodsome Hall, West Yorkshire	Sandwell Hall, Patshull Hall
Earl De La Warr	Buckhurst Park, Sussex	Bourn Hall
Earl of Denbigh	Newnham Paddox, Warwickshire	
Earl of Derby	Knowsley Hall, Merseyside	Greenhalgh Castle
Earl of Devon	Powderham Castle, Devon	Tiverton Castle, Colcombe Castle
Earl of Ducie	Talbots End Farm, near Cromhall, Gloucestershire	Tortworth Court, Spring Park
Earl of Dudley		Dudley House, Witley Court, Himley Hall, Dudley Castle
Earl of Durham	Lambton Castle, Durham	Fenton, near Wooler, Northumberland
Earl of Effingham	Readings Farmhouse, Essex	
Earl of Essex		Cassiobury House
Earl Ferrers	Ditchingham Hall, Norfolk	
Earl Fortescue	Ebrington Manor, Gloucestershire	Castle Hill
Earl of Gainsborough	Exton Hall, Rutland	
Earl Grey		Howick Hall, Fallodon Hall
Earl of Guilford	Waldershare House, Kent	
Earl of Halifax	Garrowby Hall, Yorkshire	
Earl of Harewood	Harewood House, Yorkshire	Goldsborough Hall
Earl of Harrington		Elvaston Castle, Harrington House, Gawsworth Hall
Earl of Harrowby	Sandon Hall, Staffordshire	
Earl Howe	Penn House, Buckinghamshire	
Earl of Home	The Hirsel, Berwickshire	
Earl of Iddesleigh	Hayne House, Devon and Shillands House, Devon	
Earl of Ilchester	Farley Mill, Kent	Melbury House
Earl of Iveagh	Elveden Hall, Suffolk	Iveagh House
Earl Jellicoe	Tidcombe Manor, Wiltshire	
Earl of Jersey	Radier Manor, Jersey	Middleton Park, Osterley Park
Earl of Kimberley	Hailstone House, Wiltshire	
Earl of Leicester	Holkham Hall, Norfolk	
Earl of Lichfield	Shugborough House, Staffordshire	
Earl of Lincoln		Clumber House, Boyton Manor
Earl of Lonsdale	Thrimby, Westmorland	Lowther Castle, Askham Hall
Earl of Lytton	Newbuildings Place, Sussex	Knebworth House
Earl of Macclesfield		Shirburn Castle
Earl of Malmesbury	Greywell Hill House, Hampshire	Heron Court
Earl of Morley	Pound House, Devon	Saltram House
Earl Mountbatten of Burma	Broadlands, near Romsey, Hampshire and Newhouse Manor, near Ashford, Kent	Classiebawn Castle
Earl of Mount Edgcumbe	Empacombe House, Cornwall	Mount Edgcumbe House
Earl of Onslow		Clandon Park
Earl of Oxford (Title Dormant)		Castle Hedingham, Essex
Earl of Oxford and Earl Mortimer		Brampton Bryan Hall, Eywood House
Earl of Oxford and Asquith	Mells Manor, Somerset	
Earl Peel	Elmire House, Yorkshire	
Earl of Pembroke	Wilton House, Wiltshire	Pembroke Castle
Earl of Plymouth	Oakly Park, Shropshire	Hewell Grange
Earl of Portland		Welbeck Abbey
Earl of Portsmouth	Hurstbourne Park, Hampshire	
Earl of Radnor	Longford Castle, Wiltshire and Alward House, Wiltshire	
Earl of Romney	Gayton Hall, Norfolk	Mote Park
Earl of Sandwich	Mapperton House, Dorset	Hinchingbrooke House
Earl of Scarbrough	Sandbeck Park, Yorkshire and Lumley Castle, County Durham	Tickhill Castle
Earl of Selborne	Temple Manor, Hampshire	
Earl of Shaftesbury	Ashley House, Dorset	
Earl of Shrewsbury	Wanfield Hall, Staffordshire	Alton Castle, Alton Towers, Barlow Woodseats Hall, Grafton Manor, Heythrop Park, Ingestre Hall
Earl Spencer	Althorp House, Northamptonshire and Spencer House, London	
Earl St Aldwyn	Wilderstrip House, Gloucestershire	
Earl of St Germans	Port Eliot, Cornwall	
Earl of Stradbroke	Henham Park, Suffolk	
Earl of Strafford	Apple Tree Cottage, Hampshire	Wrotham Park
Earl of Suffolk	Charlton Park, Wiltshire	
Earl of Swinton	Dykes Hill House, Yorkshire	
Earl of Tankerville		Chillingham Castle
Earl of Verulam	Gorhambury House, Hertfordshire	
Earl Waldegrave	Chewton House, Somerset	Hever Castle
Earl of Warwick		Warwick Castle
Earl of Westmorland		Raby Castle, Apethorpe Palace, Mereworth Castle
Earl of Wharncliffe		Wortley Hall
Earl of Winchelsea	Kirby Hall, Northamptonshire	Eastwell Park
Earl of Yarborough	Brocklesby House, Lincolnshire	

=== Viscounts ===
Primary title	Family seat	Former seats
Viscount Addison	Churn Barn, Huntingdonshire	
Viscount Allenby	Newnham Lodge, Hampshire	
Viscount Allendale	Bywell Hall, Northumberland and Stocksfield Hall, Northumberland	Bretton Hall
Viscount Astor	Ginge Manor, Oxfordshire	
Viscount Bearsted	Farley Hall, Hampshire	
Viscount Bledisloe	Lydney Park, Gloucestershire	
Viscount Bolingbroke		Lydiard House and Bolingbroke House
Viscount Boyd of Merton	Ince Castle, Cornwall	
Viscount Brentford	Cousley Place, Sussex	
Viscount Bridgeman	Watley House, Hampshire	
Viscount Buckmaster	Ryece Hall, Suffolk	
Viscount Chilston	The Old Rectory, Hampshire	
Viscount Cobham	Hagley Hall, Worcestershire	
Viscount Combermere		Combermere Abbey
Viscount Cowdray		Cowdray House
Viscount Daventry	Arbury Hall, Warwickshire	
Viscount De L'Isle	Penshurst Place, Kent	
Viscount Devonport	Ray Demesne, Northumberland	
Viscount Dilhorne	The Dower House, Dorset	
Viscount Eccles	Moulton Hall, Yorkshire	
Viscount Esher	Beauforest House, Oxfordshire	
Viscount Exmouth		Canonteign House
Viscount Falmouth	Tregothnan, Cornwall	
Viscount Goschen	Hilton House, Berkshire	
Viscount Hailsham	Kettlethorpe Hall, Lincolnshire	
Viscount Hampden	Glynde Place, Sussex	
Viscount Hanworth		Hanworth Park
Viscount Hardinge	Broadmere House, Hampshire	
Viscount Head	Throope Manor, Wiltshire	
Viscount Hereford		Hampton Court, Herefordshire and Castle Bromwich Hall
Viscount Hill		Hawkstone Hall
Viscount Hood	Loders Court, Dorset	
Viscount Kemsley	Church Hill Farm, Hampshire	
Viscount Knollys	Bramerton Hall, Norfolk	
Viscount Knutsford	Munden House, Hertfordshire	
Viscount Long	Owles Hall, Hertfordshire	
Viscount Marchwood		The Filberts
Viscount Melville	Wey House, Somerset	
Viscount Mersey	Bignor Park, Sussex	
Viscount Portman		Bryanston House
Viscount Ridley	Blagdon Hall, Northumberland	
Viscount Rothermere	Ferne House, Wiltshire	
Viscount Sidmouth	Highway Manor, Wiltshire	Upottery Manor
Viscount Scarsdale	Kedleston Hall, Derbyshire	
Viscount Stansgate	Stansgate House, Essex	
Viscount Trenchard	Standon Lordship, Hertfordshire	
Viscount Torrington	Great Hunts Place, Hampshire	
Viscount Wimborne	Craiganour Lodge, Perthshire	Canford Manor, Ashby St Ledgers Manor House, and Wimbourne House

=== Barons ===
Primary title	Family seat	Former seats
Baron Bagot	Blithfield Hall, Staffordshire	
Baron Barnard	Raby Castle, Durham	
Baron Benyon	Englefield House, Berkshire	
Baron Bolton	Bolton Hall, Yorkshire	
Baron Braybrooke	Audley End, Essex	
Baroness Braye	Stanford Hall, Leicestershire	
Baron Camoys	Stonor Park, Oxfordshire	
Baron Carrington		Wycombe Abbey
Baron Cavendish of Furness	Holker Hall, Cumbria	
Baron Clifford of Chudleigh	Ugbrooke Park, Devon	
Baron Digby	Minterne House, Dorset	
Baron Dudley		Dudley Castle and Himley Hall
Baron Egremont	Petworth House, East Sussex	
Baron Feversham	Duncombe Park, Yorkshire	
Baron FitzWalter	Goodnestone Park, Kent	
Baron Harris	Belmont House, Kent	
Baron Hastings	Seaton Delaval Hall, Northumberland	
Baron Hillingdon	Lound Hall, Bothamsall	
Baron Howard of Rising		Castle Rising
Baron Hylton	Ammerdown House, Kilmersdon, Somerset	
Baron Jermyn	Rushbrooke Hall, Suffolk	
Baron Leigh	Stoneleigh Abbey, Warwickshire	
Baron Macdonald	Armadale Castle, Skye	Finlaggan Castle, Loch Finlaggan
Baron Methuen	Corsham Court, Wiltshire	
Baron Mowbray, Segrave and Stourton	Allerton Castle, Yorkshire	Stourhead and Roundhay Park
Baron Petre	Ingatestone Hall, Essex and Writtle Park, Essex	
Baron Ravensworth	Eslington Park, Northumberland	
Baron Rayleigh	Terling Place, Essex	
Baron Rennell		The Rodd, Herefordshire
Baron Sandys	Ombersley Court, Worcestershire	
Baron de Saumarez	Saumarez Manor, Guernsey	
Baron Saye and Sele	Broughton Castle, Oxfordshire	
Baron Stafford	Swynnerton Hall, Staffordshire	
Baron Teynham	Pylewell Park, Hampshire	
Baroness Willoughby de Eresby	Grimsthorpe Castle, Lincolnshire	
Baron Wynford	Wynford Eagle, Dorset	

== Family seats of British baronets and gentry ==
Family name or title	Family seat
Arden family	Park Hall, Castle Bromwich, West Midlands
Babington family	Packington Hall, Staffordshire; Rothley Court, Leicestershire; Dethick Manor, Derbyshire
Barrett-Lennard baronets	Belhus, Essex
Biddulph baronets	Elmhurst Hall, Staffordshire
Bidlake family	Great Bidlake Manor, Devon
Blackett baronets	Matfen Hall, Northumberland
Blois family	Cockfield Hall, Suffolk
Bowles family	Forty Hall, London
Bulmer family	Wilton Castle, Redcar and Cleveland
Cameron-Ramsay-Fairfax-Lucy baronets	Charlecote Park, Warwickshire
Clitherow family	Boston Manor House, London
Coates family	Coates Manor, West Sussex
Corbet family	Moreton Corbet Castle, Shropshire
Davers baronets	Rushbrooke Hall, Suffolk
Dering baronets	Surrenden Dering, Kent
Dormer family	Rousham House, Oxfordshire
Fettiplace family	Compton Beauchamp House, Oxfordshire
FitzHerbert family	Tissington Hall, Derbyshire
Fulford family	Great Fulford House, Devon
Gage baronets	Hengrave Hall, Suffolk
Gascoigne baronets	Lotherton Hall, West Yorkshire
Gough family	Perry Hall, Birmingham
Grant-Suttie Baronets	Balgone House, East Lothian, Scotland
Gosling family	Hassobury, Essex
Greene baronets	Nether Hall, Suffolk
Gresley baronets	Drakelow Hall, Derbyshire
Grindlay family	Bordeshale Manor, Warwickshire (See Bordesley Hall)
Hervey-Bathurst family	Eastnor Castle, Herefordshire
Ingleby baronets	Ripley Castle, Yorkshire
Kingsbury family	Kingsbury Hall, Warwickshire
Lemon baronets	Carclew House, Cornwall
Lupton family	Potternewton Hall, West Yorkshire
Mander family	The Mount, Tettenhall Wood, West Midlands
Manningham-Buller baronets	Dilhorne Hall, Staffordshire
More-Molyneux family	Loseley Park, Surrey
Mills-Everist family	Lound Hall, Nottinghamshire
Money-Kyrle family	Whetham House, Wiltshire
Ogle family	Kirkley Hall, Northumberland
Palmes family	Naburn Hall, City of York
Pennington family	Muncaster Castle, Cumbria
Perkins family of Ufton	Ufton Court, Berkshire
Plunkett-Ernle-Erle-Drax family of Charborough	Charborough House, Charborough Park, Dorset
Pye family	Leckhampstead House, Berkshire
Rede/Reed family	Wrangle, Lincolnshire
Roper-Curzon Family	Pylewell Park, Hampshire
Rose baronets	Hardwick House, Oxfordshire
Selby family	Biddlestone Hall, Northumberland
Shelton family	Shelton Hall, Norfolk
Sitwell baronets	Renishaw Hall, Derbyshire and Weston Hall, Northamptonshire
Smalbroke family	Blakesley Hall, Birmingham
Spencer-Stanhope family	Cannon Hall, South Yorkshire
Spring family	Pakenham Hall, Suffolk
Standish baronets	Duxbury Hall, Lancashire
Strachey baronets Stribling	Sutton Court, Somerset Huntingdonshire
Strickland baronets	Boynton Hall, East Riding of Yorkshire
Strickland family of Sizergh	Sizergh Castle, Cumbria
Sutton baronets	Benham Place, Berkshire
Tempest family	Stella Hall, County Durham
Throckmorton baronets	Coughton Court, Warwickshire
Tollemache family	Helmingham Hall, Suffolk
Towneley family	Towneley Hall, Lancashire
de Trafford baronets	Croston Hall, Lancashire
Trevelyan baronets	Wallington Hall, Northumberland
Verney family	Claydon House, Buckinghamshire
Vernon family	Haddon Hall, Derbyshire
Walker-Okeover baronets	Okeover Hall, Staffordshire
Wrightson family	Cusworth Hall, South Yorkshire
Gosling Gosling family	Hassobury, Farnham

== See also ==
- List of family seats of Scottish nobility
- List of family seats of Irish nobility
- List of family seats of Welsh nobility
