= Richard Perkins =

Richard Perkins may refer to:

- Richard Perkins (actor) (c. 1585–1650), English actor
- Richard Perkins (scientist), United States nuclear physicist
- Richard Perkins (figure skater), Canadian Olympic ice dancer
- Richard Perkins (politician) (born 1961), Nevada State Assembly leader
- Richard Perkins of Ufton, a member of the Perkins family of Ufton, Berkshire, England

== See also ==
- Rick Perkins, Canadian politician
- Richard Scott Perkin (1906–1969), American entrepreneur
- Richard Perkyn (fl. 1335), English politician
