= Perkins family of Ufton =

Prominent Roman Catholic family in England

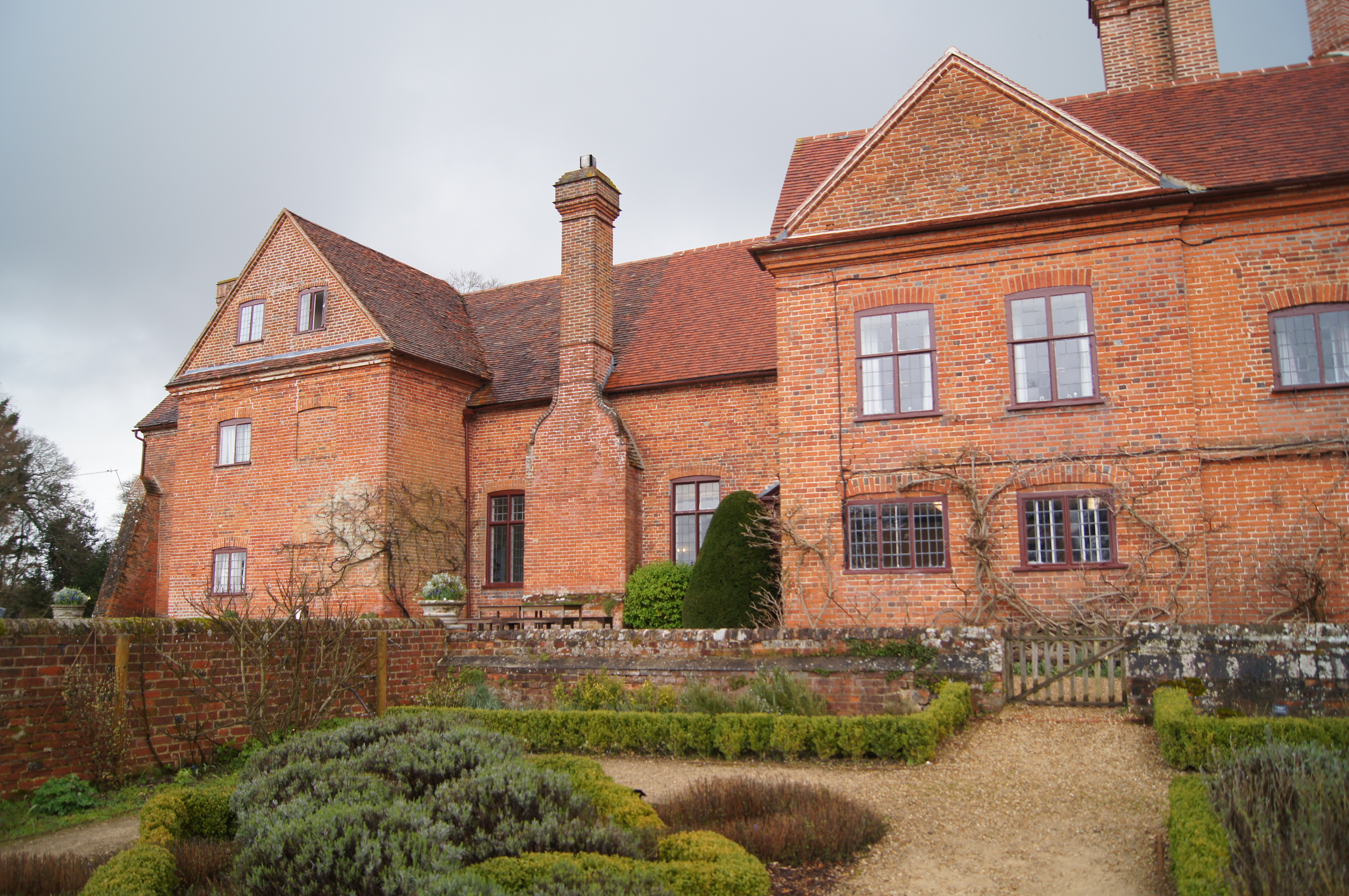
Ufton Court, the Perkins family seat

The Perkins family of Ufton Nervet in the English county of Berkshire were a prominent Roman Catholic family in Protestant England. From 1581 until 1769, a span of seven generations, they lived at Ufton Court. Their staunch adherence to Catholicism shaped both their private lives and their public fortunes in a time of severe legal penalties for recusancy.

== History ==
=== Acquisition and early years ===
Ufton Court, a Tudor manor house, was bought in 1581 by Francis Perkins, a wealthy London merchant. The estate became the seat of his descendants, who remained Catholic despite the Elizabethan Religious Settlement. The family's refusal to conform to the Church of England brought heavy fines, property seizures, and constant suspicion from the authorities. In 1587, the future martyr Swithun Wells, a relative by marriage, admitted under interrogation that he had lodged for three months at Ufton Court, then in the possession of his nephew, Francis Perkins (the son of the purchaser). The younger Perkins was fined the statutory twenty pounds a month for not attending the parish church, a penalty so severe that he was forced to lease Ufton to his cousin Thomas Perkins in order to raise the money.

=== Later generations ===
The Perkins family maintained their faith and their home through successive generations. The house was raided by government pursuivants on at least two documented occasions, but the family's elaborate network of hiding places protected visiting priests. A concealed chapel was constructed in the rafters of the roof, accessible only by a hidden stair. Priest holes, built into the thickness of the walls, provided shelter during searches. An underground escape tunnel, still partially traceable, led from the house into nearby woodland, offering a last resort for flight. These features survive today as a reminder of the lengths to which recusant families went to preserve their religion.

The last male heir of the direct line was John Perkins, who died without issue in 1769. His elder brother, Francis Perkins (d. 1736), had made an entail settling the estate, in default of his own male issue, first on John and, after John's death without heirs, on John Jones of Llanarth. Jones was the son of a Perkins daughter. The estate thereafter passed by marriage to William Congreve of Aldermaston, a cousin of the playwright William Congreve.

== Notable connections ==
Arabella Fermor (1696–1737), the daughter of a wealthy recusant family, married Francis Perkins of Ufton Court (d. 1736). Before her marriage, she had been the central figure in a real-life social episode that Alexander Pope transformed into the celebrated mock-heroic poem The Rape of the Lock. A stolen lock of her hair became the poem's central device, and Arabella's beauty and social standing made her an idealised figure of the age. Her marriage to Francis Perkins linked her to one of the most noted Catholic families in Berkshire.

== See also ==
- Ufton Court
- Recusancy
- Swithun Wells
