= List of family seats of Scottish nobility =

This is an incomplete index of leading Scottish noble family seats.

== The Royal Family ==
Name	Residences
The King	Holyrood Palace, Edinburgh; Balmoral Castle, Aberdeenshire; Dumfries House, Ayrshire; Birkhall, Aberdeenshire

== Dukes ==
Primary Title	Current Seat	Former Seats
Duke of Hamilton	Lennoxlove House, East Lothian	Hamilton Palace, Brodick Castle, Dungavel House, Kinneil House, Cadzow Castle
Duke of Buccleuch and Queensberry	Drumlanrig Castle, Dumfries and Galloway; Bowhill House, Selkirk and Boughton House, Northamptonshire	Dalkeith Palace, Midlothian and Montagu House, London
Duke of Lennox and Duke of Gordon	Goodwood House, West Sussex	Gordon Castle, Huntly Castle, and Richmond House, London
Duke of Argyll	Inveraray Castle, Argyll	Rosneath Castle, Argyll
Duke of Atholl	Blair Castle, Perth and Kinross	Dunkeld House, Perth and Kinross
Duke of Montrose	Auchmar, Stirling	Buchanan Castle, Stirling
Duke of Roxburghe	Floors Castle, Scottish Borders	
Duke of Sutherland	Mertoun House, Scottish Borders	Dunrobin Castle, Sutherland, Trentham Hall, Staffordshire, Lancaster House, London.
Duke of Fife	Elsick House, Kincardineshire and Kinnaird Castle, Brechin	

== Marquesses ==
Primary Title	Current Seat	Former Seats
Marquess of Huntly	Aboyne Castle, Aberdeenshire	Huntly Castle
Marquess of Queensberry	London	Kinmount House
Marquess of Tweeddale	Edinburgh	Yester House, East Lothian
Marquess of Lothian	Monteviot House and Ferniehirst Castle, Roxburghshire	Newbattle Abbey and Blickling Hall
Marquess of Bute	Mount Stuart House, Bute	Dumfries House, Cardiff Castle, Bute House, Luton Hoo, Lansdowne House.
Marquess of Linlithgow	Hopetoun House, South Queensferry	

== Earls ==
Primary Title	Current Seat	Former Seats
Earl of Sutherland	Dunrobin Castle, Golspie, Sutherland	Forse Castle and Skibo Castle
Earl of Crawford	Balcarres House, Colinsburgh, Fife	Crawford Castle
Earl of Mar	St Michael's Farm, Great Witley, Worcestershire	Kildrummy Castle, Mar's Wark and Doune of Invernochty
Earl of Erroll	Woodbury Hall, Bedfordshire	New Slains Castle
Earl of Caithness	London	Ravenscraig Castle
Earl of Morton	Old Mansion House, Dalmahoy near Edinburgh	Aberdour Castle, Dalkeith House, Dalmahoy, Loch Leven Castle and Morton Castle
Earl of Rothes	Dorset	Ballinbreich Castle
Earl of Buchan	Newnham House, Hampshire	Almondell House, Midlothian and Lochindorb Castle
Earl of Eglinton	Moffat	Eglinton Castle, Ardrossan Castle and Skelmorlie Castle
Earl of Cassilis	Cassillis House, Ayrshire	Culzean Castle
Earl of Moray	Darnaway Castle, Forres	Doune Castle, Drumsheugh House and Moray House
Earl of Mar and Kellie	Hilton Farm, Alloa	Kellie Castle, Fife
Earl of Home	The Hirsel, Berwickshire and Castlemains, Douglas	Hume Castle, Fast Castle, Berwickshire, Douglas Castle, Bothwell Castle
Earl of Perth	Stobhall, Perthshire	Drummond Castle
Earl of Abercorn	Baronscourt, County Tyrone	Duddingston House, Edinburgh
Earl of Strathmore and Kinghorne	Glamis Castle, Angus	Castle Huntly, Gibside Hall, Streatlam Castle and St Paul's Walden Bury
Earl of Haddington	Mellerstain House, Berwickshire	Tyninghame House in East Lothian
Earl of Galloway	Cumloden House, Wigtownshire	Galloway House, Wigtownshire
Earl of Lauderdale	Pimlico, London	Thirlestane Castle, Ham House, London and Dunbar Castle
Earl of Lindsay	Lahill House, Fife, Scotland	Combermere Abbey, Shropshire
Earl of Loudoun	Jerilderie, New South Wales	Loudoun Castle
Earl of Kinnoull	Dupplin Castle, Perth	Balhousie Castle
Earl of Dumfries	Mount Stuart House, Bute	Dumfries House, Cardiff Castle, Bute House, Luton Hoo and Lansdowne House
Earl of Elgin	Broomhall House, Fife	Culross Abbey House
Earl of Southesk	Elsick House, Kincardineshire	Duff House, Banffshire
Earl of Wemyss and March	Gosford House, East Lothian, Stanway House in Gloucestershire, Neidpath Castle, Peebles and Elcho Castle near Perth	Wemyss Castle
Earl of Dalhousie	Brechin Castle	Dalhousie Castle
Earl of Airlie	Cortachy Castle	Airlie Castle
Earl of Leven	Glenferness House Nairn	Balgonie Castle
Countess of Dysart	Rothiemurchus by Aviemore	Stobo Castle, Ham House
Earl of Selkirk	London	Brodick Castle
Earl of Northesk	Cambridge	Ethie Castle
Earl of Newburgh	Milan, Italy	Glentirran House, Stirlingshire, Slindon House, Sussex and Dilston Castle, Northumberland
Earl of Dundee	Birkhill House, Fife	Dudhope Castle
Earl of Annandale	Raehills, Dumfries and Galloway and Lochwood Tower	Lochmaben Castle
Earl of Dundonald	Lochnell Castle, Argyll and Beacon Hall, Kent	Auchindoun Castle
Earl of Kintore	Keith Hall, Aberdeenshire	Dunnottar Castle
Earl of Aberdeen	Haddo House, Aberdeenshire	Tolquhon Castle
Earl of Dunmore	Tasmania	Amhuinnsuidhe Castle and Dunmore Park, Falkirk
Earl of Orkney	Winnipeg, Manitoba	Kirkwall Castle
Earl of Seafield	Old Cullen, Moray	Castle Grant
Earl of Stair	Lochinch Castle, Wigtownshire	Oxenfoord Castle
Earl of Roseberry	Dalmeny House and Barnbougle Castle, Edinburgh	Mentmore Towers; Lansdowne House; The Durdans; Villa Rosebery, Naples
Earl of Glasgow	Kelburn Castle, Ayrshire	Stanely Castle
Earl of Hopetoun	Hopetoun House, West Lothian	Niddry Castle

== Viscounts ==
Primary Title	Current Seat	Former Seats
Viscount of Falkland	?	?
Viscount of Stormont	Scone Palace, Perthshire	
Viscount of Arbuthnott	Arbuthnott House, Kincardineshire	
Viscount of Oxfuird	Battersea, London	Oxenfoord Castle

== Lords of Parliament ==
Primary Title	Current Seat	Former Seats
Lord Cathcart	Gateley Hall, Norfolk	
Lord Forbes	Forbes Castle	
The Lady Saltoun	Inverey House, Braemar, Aberdeenshire	
Lord Gray	Airds Bay House, Taynuilt, Argyllshire	
Lord Borthwick	Crookston, Heriot	Borthwick Castle
Lord Lovat	Balblair House, Beauly, Inverness-shire	Beaufort Castle
Lord Semphill	Edinburgh	
The Lady Herries of Terregles	Arundel, West Sussex	
Lord Elphinstone	Whitberry House, Tyninghame, Dunbar, East Lothian	
Lord Torphichen	Calder House, West Lothian	
The Lady Kinloss	North View House, Sheriff Hutton, York	
Lord Balfour of Burleigh	Edinburgh	Burleigh Castle
Lord Dingwall	London	Panshanger Park, Hertfordshire
Lord Fairfax of Cameron	London	Denton Hall, North Yorkshire
Lord Napier	Thirlestane Castle	Merchiston Castle
Lord Reay	Ophemert in Gelderland, Netherlands	?
Lord Forrester	Gorhambury House, Hertfordshire	
Lord Elibank	The Coach House, Charters Road, Sunningdale, Berkshire	
Lord Belhaven and Stenton	Pimlico, London	Wishaw House
Lord Rollo	Pitcairns, Dunning, Perthshire	
Lord Ruthven of Freeland	Easington, Co. Durham	Castle Howard, Yorkshire and Naworth Castle, Cumbria
Lord Nairne	Bignor Park, Sussex	
Lord Polwarth	Hardon, Hawick, Roxburghshire	Marchmont House, Berwickshire

== Barons in the Baronage of Scotland ==
Primary Title	Current Seat	Former Seats
Baron of Abergeldie		Abergeldie Castle
Baron of Bearcrofts	Castle Stewart, Newton Stewart	
Baroness of Ballindalloch	Ballindalloch Castle	
Baron of Balvaird	Balvaird Castle	
Baron of Balvenie	Balvenie Castle	
Baron of Benholm	Benholm Castle	
Baron of Braemar	Braemar Court, Braemar, and Everwise Hall (Palm Beach, Florida)	
Baron of Buittle	Buittle Castle	
Baron of Carmichael, Chief of Clan Carmichael	Carmichael	
Baron of Coupar	Mountain Lake, Florida	Coupar Angus Abbey
Baron of Colstoun	Colstoun House	
Baron of Drum, Chief of Name of Irvine	Drum Castle	
Baron of Ethie, Chief of Clan Forsyth	Ethie Castle	
Baron of Kilcoy	Kilcoy Castle	
Baron of Kilduthie, Chief of Clan Burnett	Crathes Castle	
Baron of Kinnairdy	Kinnairdy Castle	
Baroness of Miltonhaven	Lauriston Castle, Aberdeenshire	Newlands, Drumcow
Baron of Leslie	Leslie Castle	
Baron of Logiealmond	Logiealmond Estate	
Baron of Midmur	Inverurie castle	
Baron of Myrton	London	Myrton Castle, Wigtownshire
Baron of Pitcaple	Pitcaple Castle	
Baron of Portlethen	Thornbury Castle	
Baron of Rusco	Rusco Castle	
Baron of Seabegs	Seabegs	Feddal House
Baron of Strathlachlan	New Castle Lachlan	
Baron of Swinton	Edinburgh	Swinton House, Swinton
Baron of Winchburgh	Avondale, Newfoundland, Canada	Niddry Castle, Winchburgh
Baroness of Traquair	Traquair House	

== Baronets and Lairds ==
Primary Title	Current Seat	Former Seats
Sir Henry Reid	Ellon Castle	
Mr Donald Cameron	Achnacarry Castle	Fassiefern House and Tor Castle
Lady Antonia Dalrymple		Newhailes House, East Lothian
Dame Jean Maxwell-Scott	Abbotsford House, Scottish Borders	
Mr James Montgomery		Kinross House, Perth and Kinross
Mr Patrick Gordon-Duff-Pennington	Ardverikie House, Scottish Highlands	Muncaster Castle
Mrs Althea Dundas-Becker	Arniston House, Midlothian	
Major-General Sir John Swinton of Kimmerghame	Kimmerghame House, Berwickshire	
Sir John Roderick Hugh McEwen of Marchmont and Bardrochat Bt, Commander of Clan MacEwen	The Steadings, Polwarth	Marchmont House
Sir Roderick Duncan Hamilton Campbell of Barcaldine, 9th Bt.		
Mrs Sarah Anne Grierson of Lag, 25th Chief of Clan Grierson	London	Lag Tower and Rockhall Tower

== See also ==
- Scottish clan
- List of family seats of English nobility
- List of family seats of Irish nobility
- List of family seats of Welsh nobility
