= List of family seats of Welsh nobility =

This is an incomplete list of Welsh titled gentry family seats.

See also Welsh peers and baronets

Primary Title	Family Seat
The Marquess of Anglesey	Plas Newydd, Anglesey, Wales
The Marquess of Milford Haven	
The Earl of Carnarvon	Highclere Castle, Hampshire, England
The Earl Cawdor of Castlemartin in Pembroke	Cawdor Castle, Nairn, Scotland
The Earl of Denbigh and Desmond	Newnham Paddox, Warwickshire, England
The Earl Lloyd George of Dwyfor	Ffynone, near Newcastle Emlyn in Carmarthenshire, Wales
The Earl of Pembroke and Montgomery	Wilton House, Wiltshire, England
The Earl of Powis	Powis Castle, near Welshpool, Powys, Wales
The Earl of Snowdon	
The Earl of Lisburne	Trawsgoed, near Aberystwyth, Ceredigion, Wales.
The Viscount St Davids	
The Viscount Tredegar	Tredegar House, Monmouthshire, Wales
The Baron Dynevor	Historically, from the 12th century until 1974, Newton House, Llandeilo
The Lord Glanusk	Dower House in Glanusk Park, Powys, Wales
The Williams-Bulkeley baronets	Baron Hill, Anglesey, Wales
The Williams-Wynn baronets	Historically, until 1920, Bodelwyddan Castle, Denbighshire, Wales
The Baron of Cymmer-yn-Edeirnion	Historically, until 16th century, Gwerclas Castle, later Pen-y-Clawdd near Chirk, Denbighshire, Wales

== See also ==
- List of family seats of English nobility
- List of family seats of Scottish nobility
- List of family seats of Irish nobility
