= Tyle Mill Lock =

Canal lock in Berkshire, England

Coordinates: 51.41747°N 1.10118°W

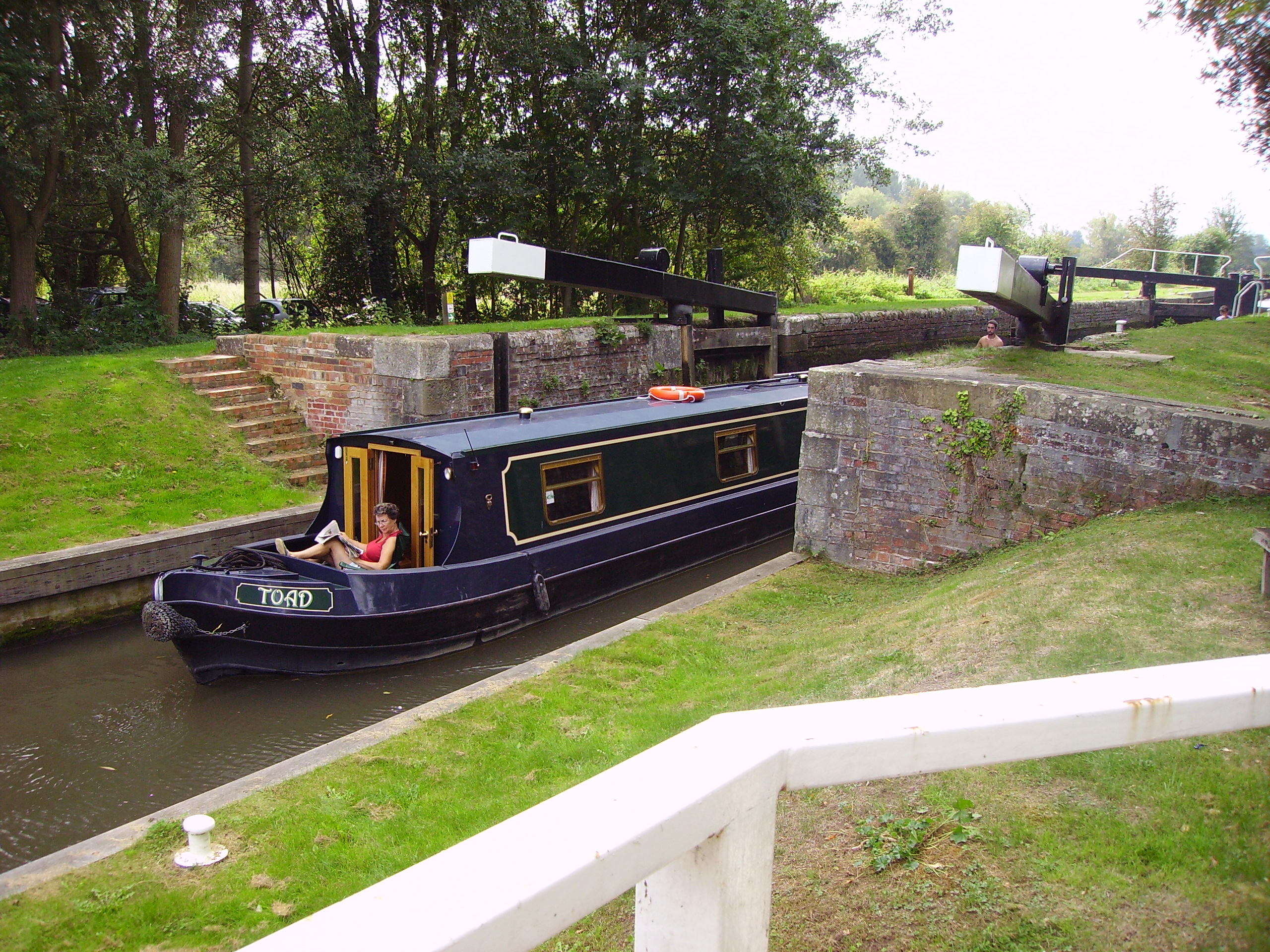
Tyle Mill Lock, Sulhamstead

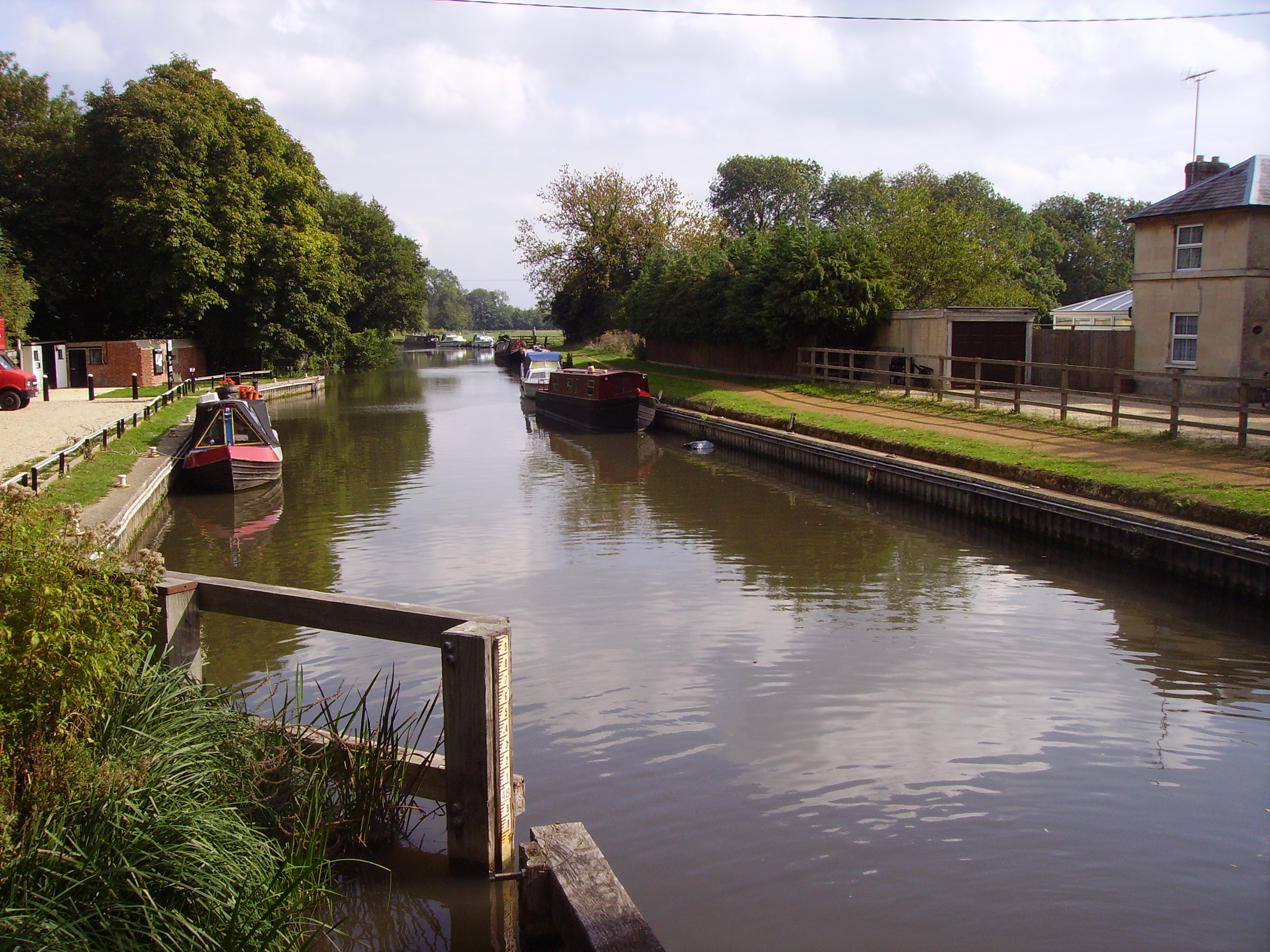
Sulhamstead Tyle Mill Wharf

Tyle Mill Lock (grid reference SU626691) is a lock situated near Tyle Mill and the village of Sulhamstead on the Kennet and Avon Canal, England.

Tyle Mill Lock was built between 1718 and 1723 under the supervision of the engineer John Hore of Newbury, and this stretch of the river is now administered by the Canal & River Trust as part of the Kennet Navigation. It has a change in level of 6 ft 4 in (1.93 m).

The lock became derelict in the 1950s and then formed the head of the navigation from the River Thames. As a result, British Waterways created a winding hole and installed a sanitary station in the old pillbox below the lock. It was restored in 1973 but remained out of commission until 1976 when work on locks further west had been completed.

Close to the lock are a wharf and swing bridge.

== Swing bridge gallery ==
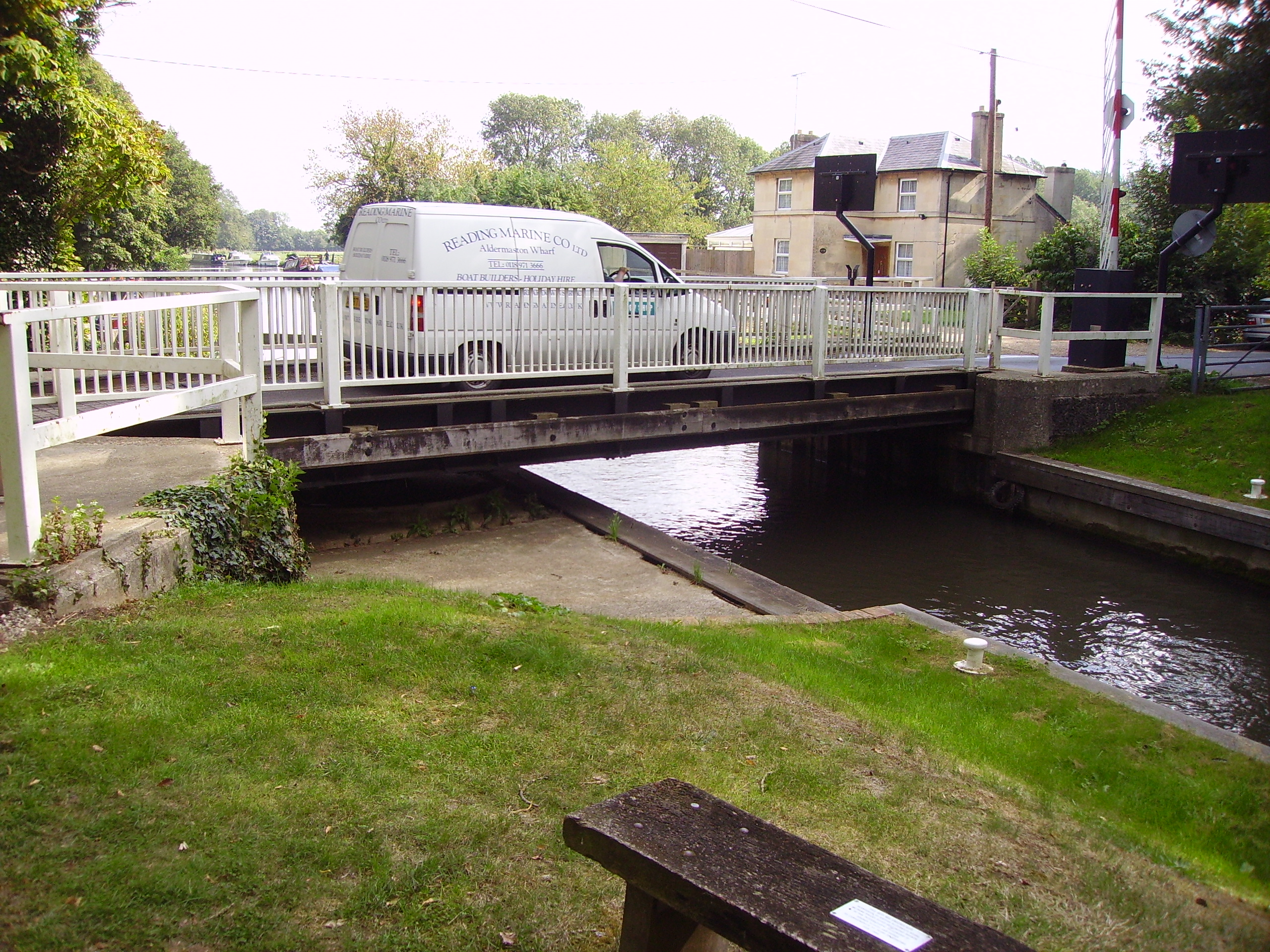
Sulhamstead Tyle Mill swing bridge road traffic

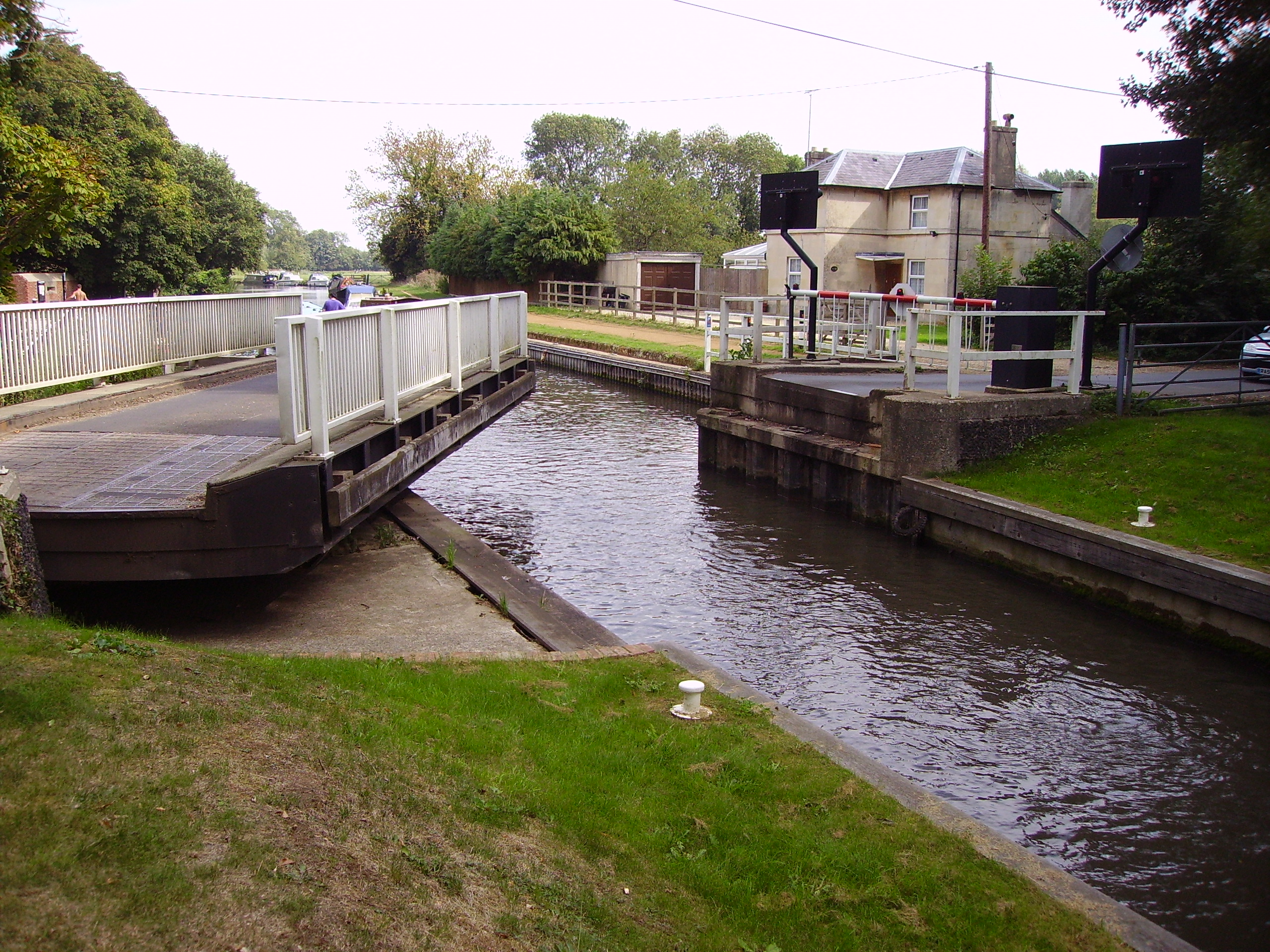
Sulhamstead Tyle Mill swing bridge opening

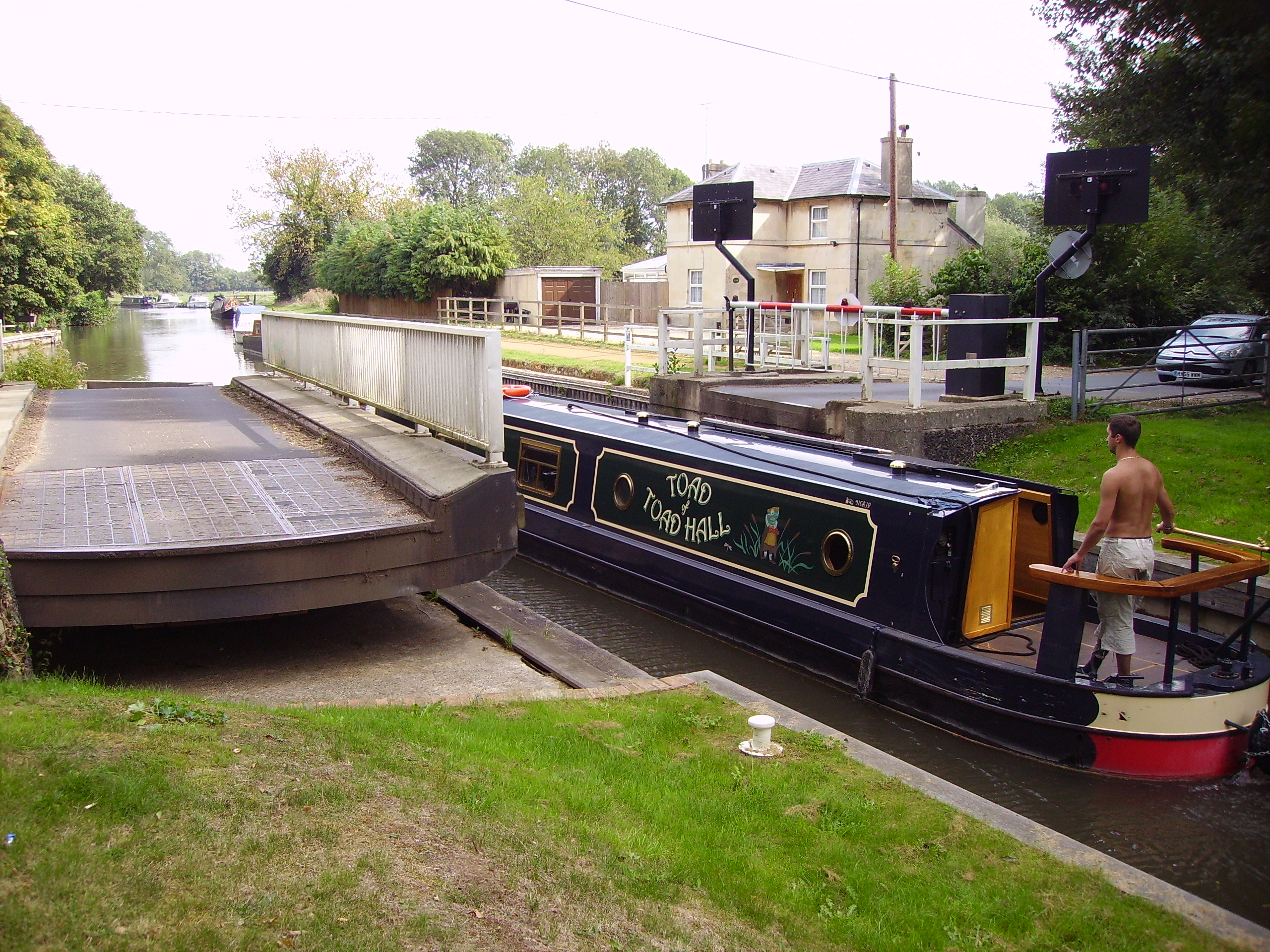
Sulhamstead Tyle Mill swing bridge canal traffic

== See also ==
- Locks on the Kennet and Avon Canal

Next lock upstream	River Kennet / Kennet and Avon Canal	Next lock downstream
Towney Lock	Tyle Mill Lock; Grid reference: SU626691	Sulhamstead Lock
