= Sulhamstead =

Coordinates: 51°24′47″N 1°05′24″W

- Village and civil parish
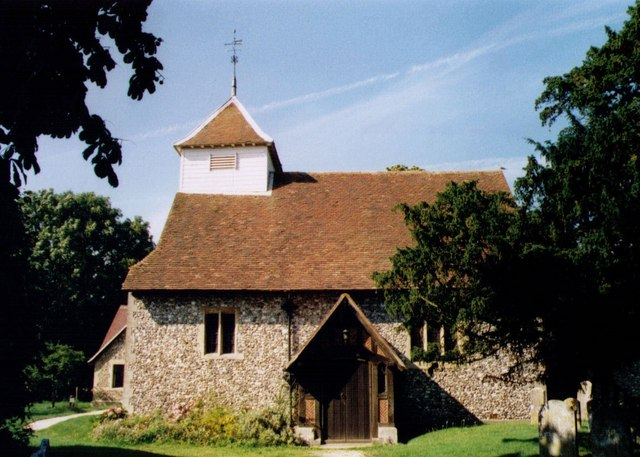
- St.Mary's Church, Sulhamstead Abbots

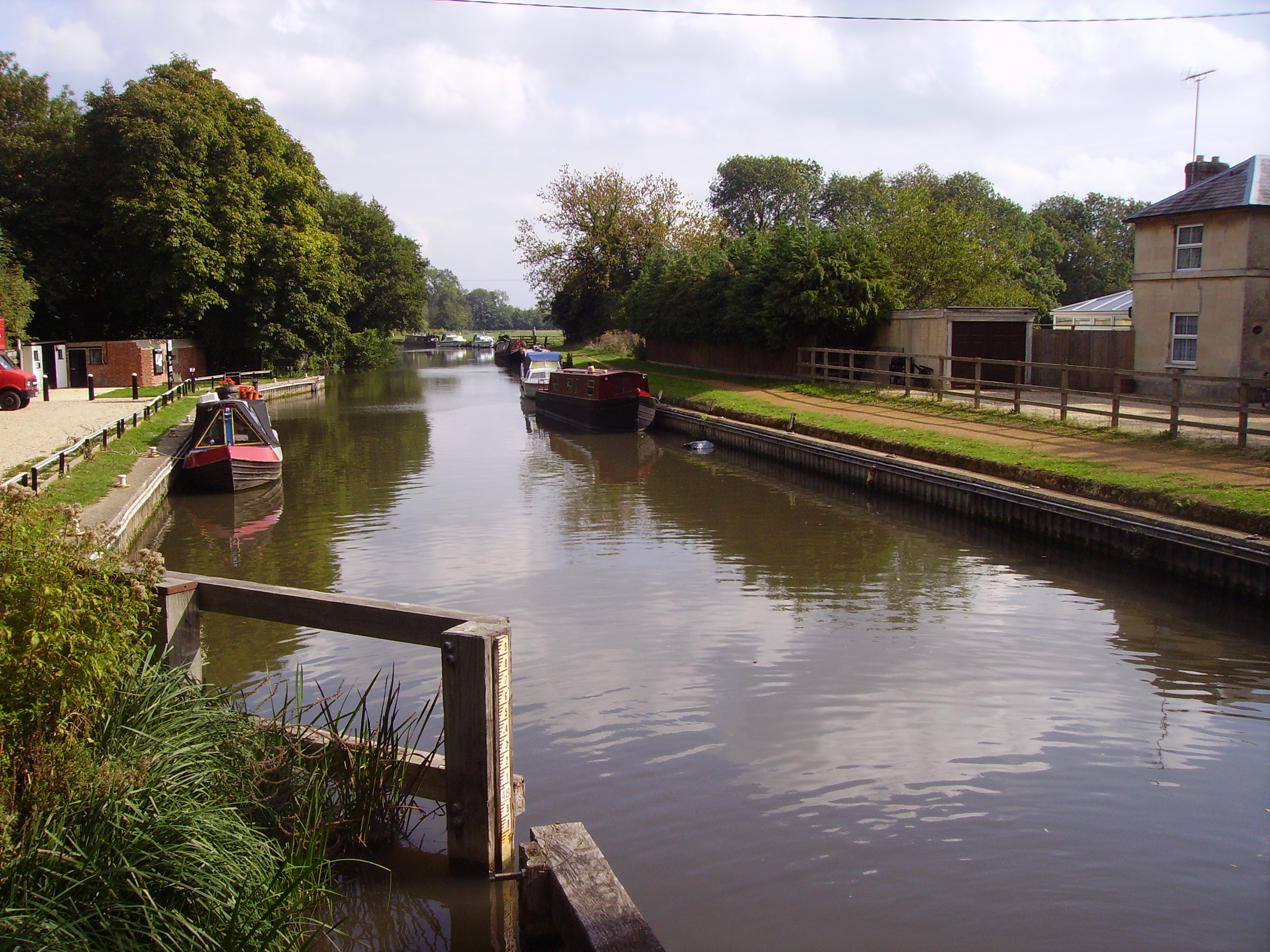
- Sulhamstead Tyle Mill wharf

- Location within Berkshire
- Area: 7.08 km^{2} (2.73 sq mi)
- Population: 1,471 (2011 census)
  - Density: 208/km^{2} (540/sq mi)
- OS grid reference: SU6369
- Civil parish: Sulhamstead
- Unitary authority: West Berkshire
- Ceremonial county: Berkshire
- Region: South East
- Country: England
- Sovereign state: United Kingdom
- Post town: READING
- Postcode district: RG7
- Dialling code: 0118
- Police: Thames Valley
- Fire: Royal Berkshire
- Ambulance: South Central
- UK Parliament: Wokingham

Sulhamstead is a village and civil parish in the West Berkshire district, in the ceremonial county of Berkshire, England. It occupies an approximate rectangle of land (Note: With a short, half-width south-west projection, west of Burghfield.) south of the (Old) Bath Road (A4) between Reading, its nearest town and Thatcham. It has several small clusters of homes and woodland covering about a fifth of the land, in the centre and north beside which is Thames Valley Police's main Training Centre at Sulhamstead House. Its main amenities are its Church of England parish church and a shop and visitor centre by the Kennet & Avon Canal. In 2011 the parish had a population of 1471.

== Geography ==
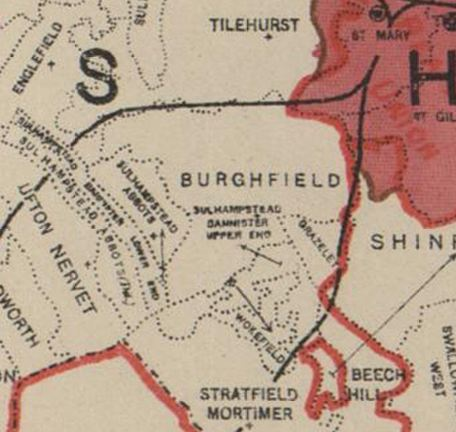
1888 Ordnance Survey Parish Boundary Map

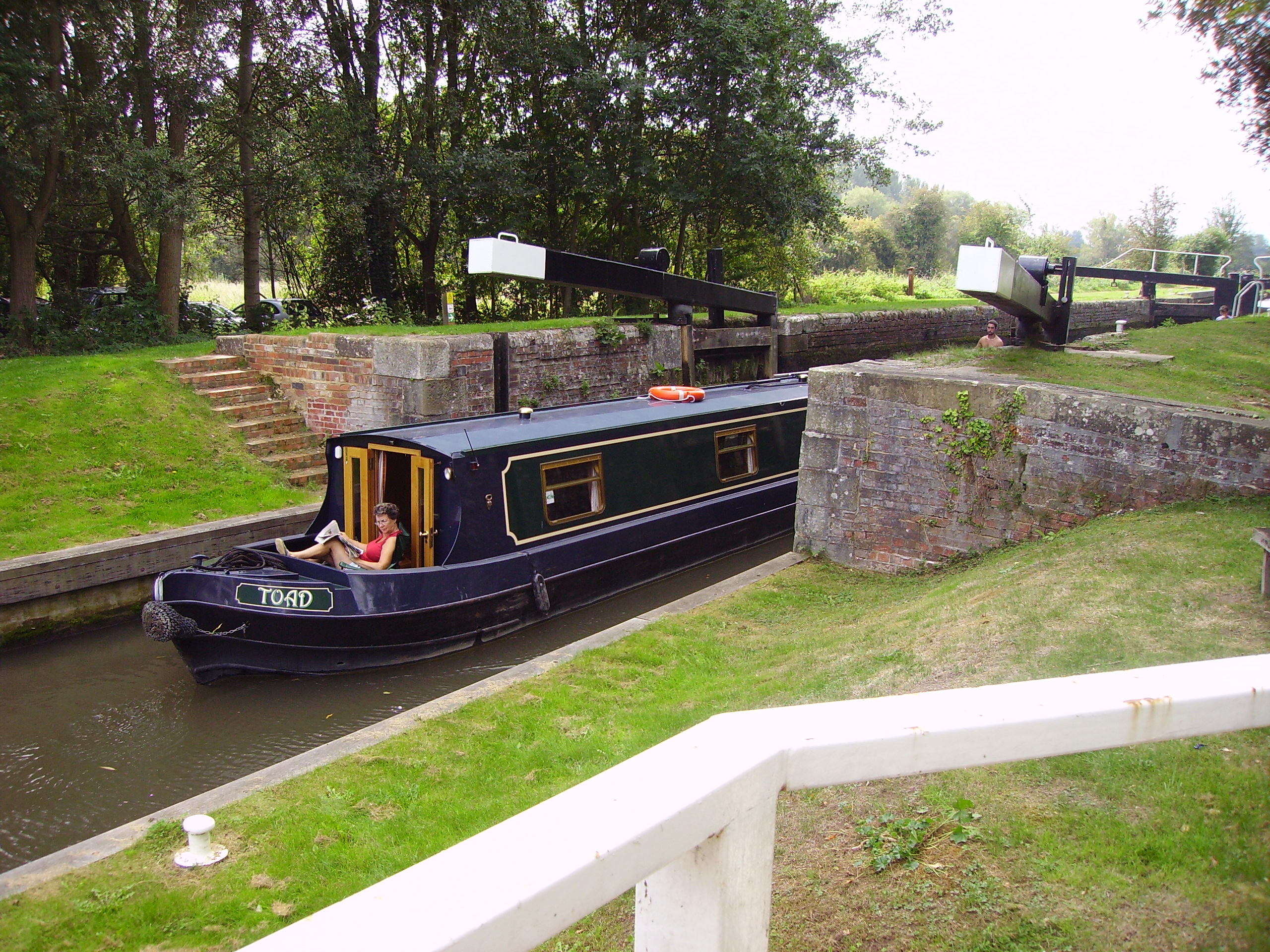
Tyle Mill Lock

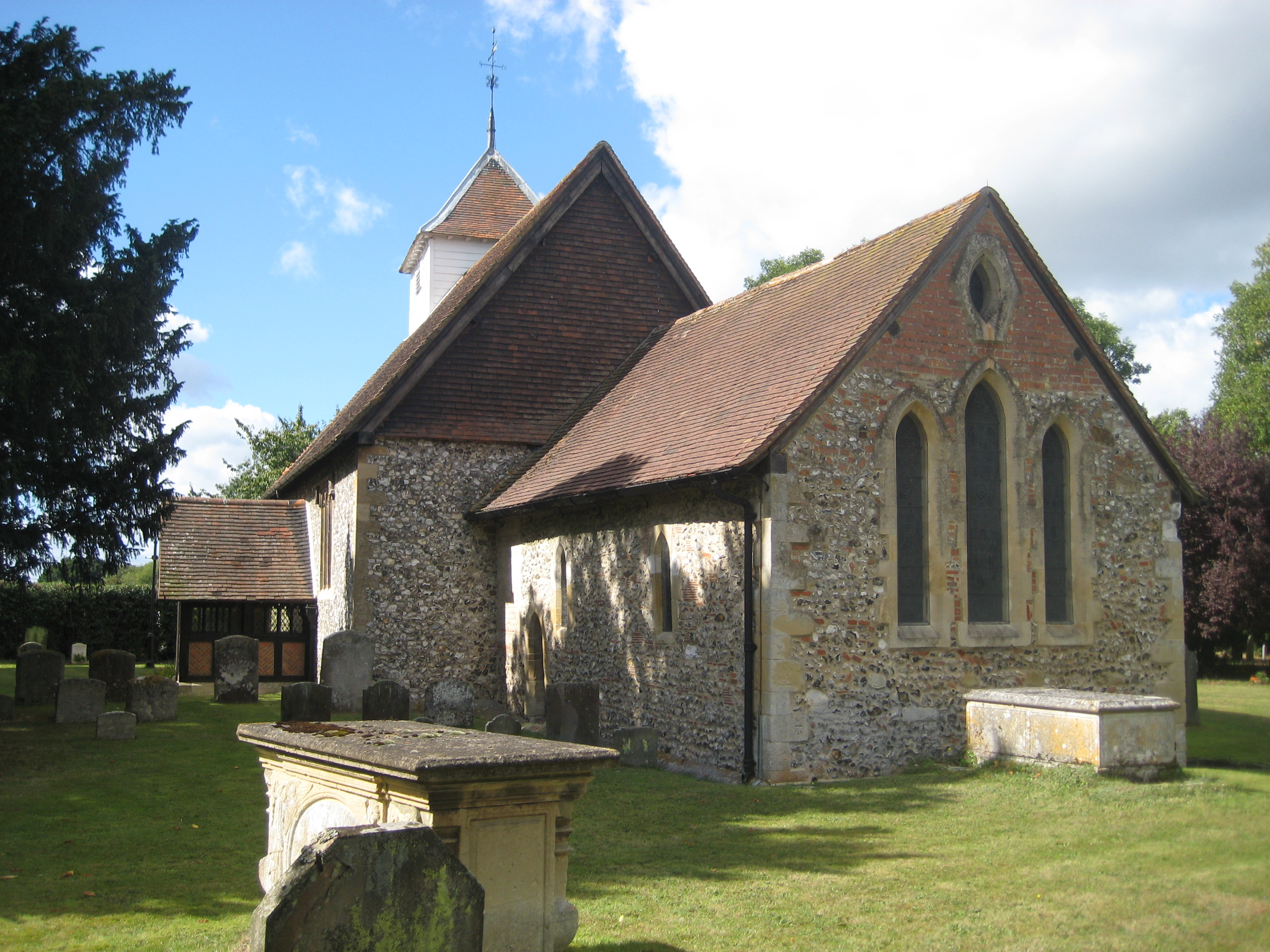
Church of St Mary

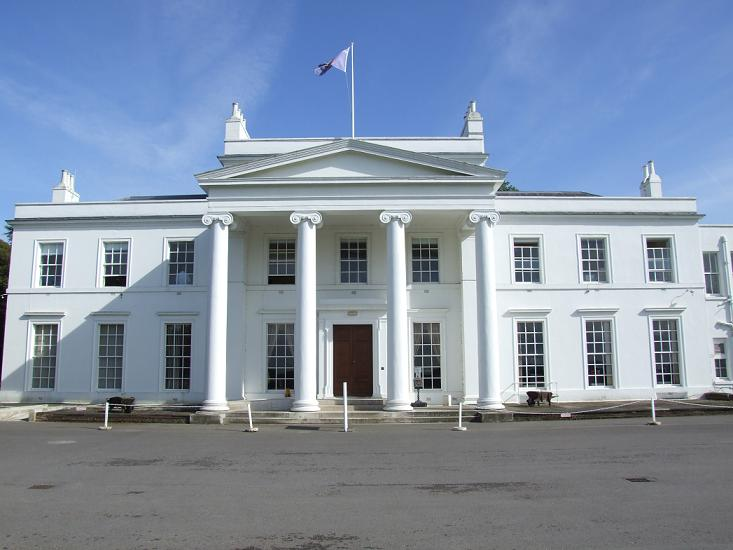
The 'White House' at Sulhamstead where the Thames Valley Police Museum is housed.

Sulhamstead's immediate neighbours toward its northern border, the A4 road, are the much more populous Theale, which has the nearest railway station and shops, and Ufton Nervet. Across this road is Englefield which has five clusters of homes. The greatest of these is linear, on Sulhamstead Hill Road from the top of the hill by Ufton Church down 1 mile (1.6 km) to the water meadows by the River Kennet and the A4 Road. Three further developed points are Sulhamstead Abbots, Whitehouse Green and Sulhamstead Bannister. Finally, Burghfield Common village is in the far south, which is in the remainder of the parish of Burghfield.

Sulhamstead Abbots Church, St Mary's, being to the south, is the active parish church. Sulhamstead Bannister forms the narrowly buffered halves: "Upper End" and "Lower End". Upper End is between Wokefield and Grazeley, although this has since been absorbed into Wokefield civil parish. The core of its village was around the old demolished church, where the inventor Samuel Morland's father was once the vicar. Before 1782, Sulhamstead consisted of two parishes, Sulhamstead Abbots and Sulhamstead Bannister, approximate to the boundaries of the manors of the same name before the medieval period.

== History ==
A Congregational church was built in 1881 in place of an older chapel. The inclosure of the two parishes of Sulhamstead Abbots and Sulhamstead Bannister was made by an act of Parliament, which was effective in 1817. Grazeley was a tithing in the parish of Sulhamstead Abbots which contained 519 acres (2.10 km^{2}). In 1854, when the manorial estate of Grazeley was advertised for sale, it was inclosed in a ring fence and apparently included the whole tithing.

Between 2013 and 2015, eight gold coins from a single treasure hoard were discovered at an undisclosed location near Sulhamstead. The coins are estimated as having been buried between 20 and 30 BC. Six of these coins are quarter staters, similar to some others found in Berkshire and Wiltshire. The remaining two are believed to have originated from North West France. The coins were subsequently displayed in the West Berkshire Museum.

On 15 August 2019, Sulhamstead was the location of the killing of Andrew Harper, a police officer of the Thames Valley Police Roads Policing Unit, who was responding to reports of a local burglary.

== Landmarks ==
=== Sulhamstead House ===
Sulhamstead House, commonly known as the White House, was the manor house of Sulhamstead Abbots. It was built by Daniel May, son of the Basingstoke brewer, Charles May, in 1744, becoming the home to his sister's descendants, the Thoyts family. The house was largely rebuilt in 1800 for William Thoyts, the High Sheriff of Berkshire. It was the childhood home of his great granddaughter, Berkshire historian and palaeographer, Emma Elizabeth Thoyts (1860–1949). Its refurbishment was paid for in 1910 by William G Watson, who was created a baronet of Sulhamstead). The baronetcy is extinct. In 1949, the house became the headquarters of the Berkshire Constabulary. Since their merger into Thames Valley Police, it has functioned as that force's training centre and museum. It is a Grade II listed building. The Sulhamstead estate is owned by the Astor family.

=== Folly Farm ===
This was built around a small timber-framed cottage dating to around 1650, which was gradually enlarged into a farm house and now survives as a small wing of the house. The house was transformed in 1906 by the Arts and Crafts architect Edwin Lutyens into a country house for H. H. Cochrane. It was extended, by Lutyens, for Zachary Merton, six years later. It is one of Lutyens' best-known house designs. Lutyens collaborated with Gertrude Jekyll to make the diverse, multi-level garden. Folly Farm is a Grade I listed building, as it is an exceptional example of Arts and Craft architecture.

=== Other buildings ===
The church of St Mary's (formerly St Bartholomew's) dates from the 13th century and is a Grade I listed building. The active village hall for Sulhamstead and Ufton Nervet is halfway down the road Sulhamstead Hill, built in 1927. Sulhamstead Lock, Tyle Mill and Tyle Mill Lock on the Kennet & Avon Canal have a wharf, lock and swing bridge. The singer-songwriter Kate Bush lived in a large canalside home for several years until 2004.

== Omer's Gully ==
Omer's Gully Wood is a 3.6-hectare (8.9-acre) wood that is bordered to the north-west corner of Burghfield Common. It is mostly owned by Englefield (Manor) Estate, with the remainder owned by the West Berkshire Council. The woodland has historically been well coppiced for firewood. 86 different plant species and 46 different birds have been found and it is a recorded habitat for mammals including foxes, deer, badgers, squirrels and rabbits. This woodland links up with other woodlands by Omers Brook, such as Clayhill Copse, which lies to the north east and is part of a larger natural woodland covered habitat.

== Notable people ==
- Florence Nagle (1894–1988), racehorse and dog breeder.
- Kate Bush (b.1958), singer-songwriter, lived in Sulhamstead from the 1990s to 2004.
- Keith Floyd (1943–2009), chef and restaurateur, born in Sulhamstead.

== Demography ==
2011 Published Statistics: Population, home ownership and extracts from Physical Environment, surveyed in 2005
Output area	Homes owned outright	Owned with a loan	Socially rented	Privately rented	Other	km^{2} roads	km^{2} water	km^{2} domestic gardens	Usual residents	km^{2}
Civil parish	134	210	144	73	14	0.193	0.221	0.299	1471	7.08
