= List of family seats of Irish nobility =

This is an incomplete index of the current and historical principal family seats of clans, peers and landed gentry families in Ireland. Most of the houses belonged to the Old English and Anglo-Irish aristocracy, and many of those located in the present Republic of Ireland were abandoned, sold or destroyed following the Irish War of Independence and Irish Civil War of the early 1920s.

== List of family seats of Irish Peers ==
Primary title	Family seat	City townhouse
Duke of Abercorn	Baronscourt, County Tyrone	Corner of York Street and St Stephen's Green
Duke of Leinster	Maynooth Castle, County Kildare; Carton House, Maynooth; Kilkea Castle, County Kildare	Leinster House; 13 Dominick Street
Marquess Conyngham	Slane Castle	
Marquess of Donegall	Belfast Castle, County Antrim; Dunbrody House, County Wexford	
Marquess of Downshire	Clifton Castle, North Yorkshire	
Marquess of Ely	Loftus Hall, County Wexford Rathfarnham Castle	Ely House, Ely Place
Marquess of Londonderry	Mount Stewart, County Down	
Marquess of Sligo	Westport House, County Mayo	
Marquess of Waterford	Curraghmore, County Waterford	Tyrone House
Earl of Aldborough	Belan Lodge, Moone, County Kildare; Stratford Lodge, County Wicklow; Mountneil House, County Carlow	Aldborough House, Dublin; Stratford House, London
Earl of Antrim	Glenarm Castle, County Antrim	Antrim House, Merrion Square
Earl of Bandon	Castle Bernard, County Offaly	
Earl of Bantry	Bantry House, County Cork	
Earl of Barrymore	Fota House, County Cork	
Earl of Bective	Headfort House	Bective House, Smithfield; Bective House, Parnell Square
Earl of Bellomont	Bellamont House, County Cavan	15 Temple Street
Earl Belmore	Castle Coole, County Fermanagh	
Earl of Belvedere	Belvedere House, County Westmeath	Belvedere House
Earl of Bessborough	Stansted Park, West Sussex	5 Henrietta Street
Earl of Charlemont	Marino House	Charlemont House
Earl of Charleville	Charleville Castle	1 Great Denmark Street
Earl of Clancarty	Garbally Court, County Galway	
Earl of Clare	Mountshannon House, County Limerick	
Earl of Clonmell	Bishopscourt, County Kildare; Eathorpe Hall, Warwickshire	Clonmell House, 17 Harcourt Street
Earl of Courtown	Courtown House, County Wexford	Ormond Quay
Earl of Desart	Desart Court, County Kilkenny	
Earl of Drogheda	Moore Abbey, County Kildare	Drogheda House, North Earl Street
Earl of Dunraven and Mount-Earl	Kilgobbin House; Adare Manor, County Limerick	
Earl of Enniskillen	Florence Court, County Fermanagh	
Earl Erne		4 Great Denmark Street
Earl of Fingall	Killeen Castle, Dunsany, County Meath	5 Great Denmark Street
Earl of Glandore	Ardfert Abbey, County Kerry	
Earl of Gosford	Gosford Castle, County Armagh	
Earl of Granard	Castleforbes, Newtown Forbes, County Longford	
Earl of Howth	Howth Castle, Fingal	
Earl of Kenmare	Killarney House, County Kerry	Kenmare House, North Great George's Street
Earl of Kilmorey	Mourne Park, County Down	
Earl of Kingston	Mitchelstown Castle, County Cork King House, Boyle, County Roscommon	
Earl of Listowel	Convamore House, County Cork	
Earl of Mayo	Palmerstown House, County Kildare	
Earl of Meath	Kilruddery House, County Wicklow	Ardee House, Ardee Street
Earl of Milltown	Russborough House, County Wicklow	
Earl of Mornington	Dangan Castle, County Meath	Mornington House
Earl Mountbatten of Burma	Classiebawn Castle, County Sligo	Clonbrock, County Galway
Earl Mount Cashell	Moore Park, County Cork; The Barne Estate, Clonmel, County Tipperary	
Earl of Norbury		3 Great Denmark Street
Earl of Portarlington	Emo Court, County Laois	
Earl of Roden	Tollymore Park, County Down	
Earl of Roscommon		
Earl of Rosse	Birr Castle, County Offaly	
Earl of Shannon	Castlemartyr House, County Cork	
Earl of Thomond	Dromoland Castle	5 Henrietta Street
Earl of Tyrconnell	Donegal Castle, County Donegal	
Earl of Tyrone	Tyrone House, Dublin	
Earl of Westmeath	Clonyn Castle, County Westmeath	
Viscount Ashbrook	Castle Durrow, County Laois	
Viscount Baltinglass	San Antonia House, County Wicklow	
Viscount Bangor	Castle Ward, County Down	
Viscount Barnewall	Turvey House	
Viscount Boyne	Stackallan House	
Viscount Charlemont	Roxborough Castle, County Tyrone	
Viscount Doneraile	Doneraile Court, County Cork	Doneraile House, 45 Kildare Street
Viscount FitzWilliam	Merrion Castle, County Dublin	
Viscount Gormanston	Gormanston Castle, County Meath	
Viscount Gough	St. Helen's, Booterstown, Dublin	
Viscount Hawarden	Dundrum House, County Tipperary	
Viscount Langford	Summerhill House, County Meath; Mount Campbell, County Leitrim; Langford Lodge, County Antrim	Langford House, Mary Street; Granby Row
Viscount Lifford	Meenglass House, County Donegal	
Viscount Lorton	Rockingham Estate, County Roscommon	
Viscount Massereene	Antrim Castle, County Antrim	
Viscount Powerscourt	Powerscourt House, County Wicklow	
Viscount de Vesci	Abbeyleix House, County Laois	
Baron Annaly	Luttrellstown Castle, Dublin	
Baron Barry of Santry	Santry Court, County Dublin	
Baron Bellew	Barmeath Castle, County Louth	
Baron Blayney	Blayney Castle, County Monaghan	
Baron Castlemaine	Moydrum Castle, County Westmeath	
Baron Carew	Donadea House, County Kildare	
Baron Clonbrock	Clonbrock Castle, County Galway	
Baron Cloncurry	Lyons Demesne, County Kildare	
Baron Crofton	Mote House, County Roscommon	
Baron Dunalley	Kilboy House, County Tipperary	
Baron of Dunsany	Dunsany Castle, County Meath	
Baron Hartland	Strokestown Park, County Roscommon	
Baron Inchiquin	Dromoland Castle, County Clare	
Baron Kingston	Rockingham, County Roscommon	
Baron Monteagle of Brandon	Mount Trenchard House, County Kerry	
Baron Muskerry	Springfield Castle, County Limerick	
Baron Rathdonnell	Lisnavagh House, County Carlow	
Baron Talbot de Malahide	Malahide Castle, Dublin	
Baron Trimlestown	Trimlestown, County Meath	
Baron Ventry	Burnham House, Dingle, County Kerry	

== Family seats of clans, baronets and gentry in Ireland ==
Family name or title	Family seat	City townhouse
Babington family	Creevagh House, County Londonderry; Greenfort House, County Donegal	
Bland family	Derryquin Castle, County Kerry	
Blunden baronets	Castle Blunden, County Kilkenny	
Burke baronets	Glinsk Castle, County Galway	
Chapman baronets	Killua Castle, County Westmeath	
Colthurst baronets	Blarney Castle, County Cork	
Cooper family	Markree Castle, County Sligo	
Cotter baronets	Rockforest, County Cork	
Denny family	Tralee Castle, County Kerry	
Drought family	Droughtville, County Offaly; Lettybrook, County Offaly; Whigsborough, County Offaly	
Ennis baronets	Ballinahown Court, County Westmeath	
Esmonde baronets	Ballynastragh, County Wexford	
Godfrey baronets	Bushfield House, County Kerry	
Gore-Booth baronets	Lissadell House, County Sligo	
Guinness family	Ashford Castle, County Mayo	
Leslie clan	Castle Leslie, County Monaghan	
Levinge baronets	Knockdrin Castle, County Westmeath	
Lynch-Blosse baronets	Athavallie House, County Mayo	
Mac Aodhagáin clan	Redwood Castle, County Tipperary	
MacNamara clan	Knappogue Castle, County Clare	
Musgrave baronets	Tourin House, County Waterford	
Nugent baronets	Ballinlough Castle, County Westmeath	
Osborne baronets (of Ballentaylor and Ballylemon)	Newtown Anner House, County Tipperary	
O'Brien baronets (Boris-in-Ossory)	Lohort Castle, County Cork	Merrion Square
Ó Cianáin family	Ardrass House, County Kildare	
O'Conor Don	Clonalis House, County Roscommon	
O'Dea clan	O'Dea Castle, County Clare	
O'Doherty family	Carrickabraghy Castle, County Donegal	
O'Donnell of Tyrconnell	Donegal Castle, County Donegal	
O'Donoghue clan	Ross Castle, County Kerry	
O'Donovan clan	Castle Donovan, County Cork	
O'Farrelly family	Drumlane Abbey, County Cavan	
O'Farrell family	Longford, County Longford	
O'Flaherty clan	Aughnanure Castle, County Galway	
O'Grady family	Kilballyowen, County Limerick	
O'Higgins family	Ballynary, County Sligo	
O'Reilly clan	Cloughoughter Castle, County Cavan	
Piers baronets	Tristernagh Abbey, County Westmeath	
Richardson family	Richhill Castle, County Armagh	
Richardson-Bunbury baronets	Augher Castle, County Tyrone	
Spring family	Killagha Abbey, County Kerry	
St George baronets	Tyrone House, County Galway	
Staples baronets	Lissan House, County Tyrone	
Stronge baronets	Tynan Abbey, County Armagh	
Tuite baronets	Sonnagh Castle, County Westmeath	
Warren baronets	Warren's Court, County Cork	

== See also ==
- List of family seats of English nobility
- List of family seats of Scottish nobility
- List of family seats of Welsh nobility
- Destruction of Irish country houses (1919–1923)
- Sale of Irish country house contents
