= Tyle Mill =

Coordinates: 51°25′9″N 1°6′2″W

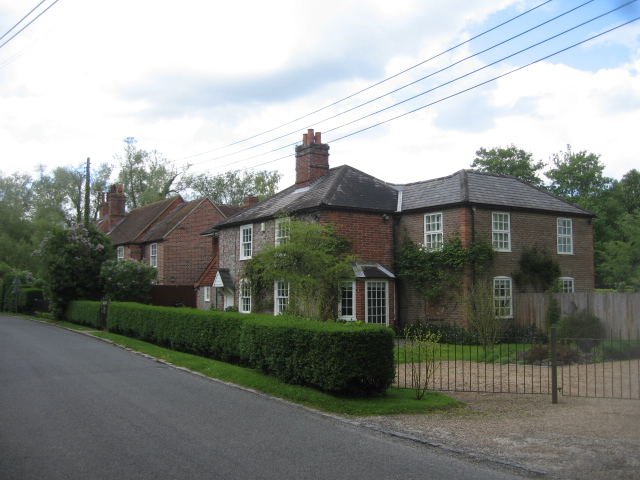
Tyle Mill cottages

Tyle Mill is a mill on the River Kennet near Sulhamstead, Berkshire, England. The mill originally produced flour; a fire in 1914 burned down the buildings and the rebuilt mill became a sawmill. In 1936 it was acquired by George Clemens Usher, director of Abedare Cables of South Africa Limited, and became a private house which was owned by him for decades.

Tyle Mill Lock on the Kennet Navigation is near the mill.
