= Family seat =

Principal country residence of an upper-class family across multiple generations

A family seat, sometimes just called seat, is the principal residence of the landed gentry and aristocracy. The residence usually denotes the social, economic, political, or historic connection of the family within a given area. Some families took their dynasty name from their family seat (Habsburg, Hohenzollern, and Windsor), or named their family seat after their own dynasty's name. The term family seat was first recorded in the 11th century Domesday Book where it was listed as the word caput. The term continues to be used in the British Isles today. A clan seat refers to the seat of the chief of a Scottish clan.

== Examples ==
- List of family seats of English nobility
- List of family seats of Irish nobility
- List of family seats of Scottish nobility
- List of family seats of Welsh nobility
