= Sulhamstead Lock =

Berkshire, England water lock

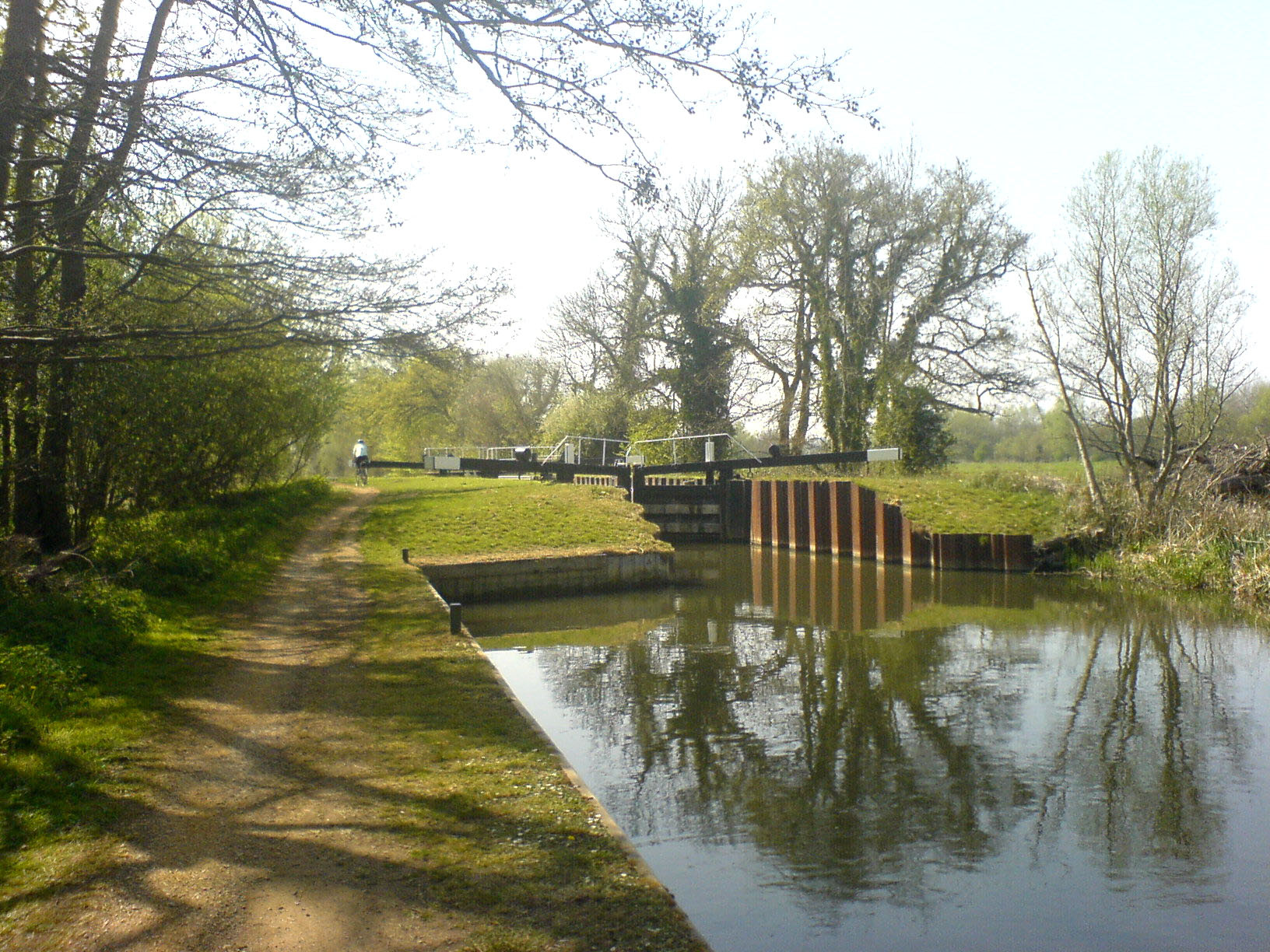
- Interactive map of Sulhamstead Lock
- 51°25′29″N 1°05′05″W
- Waterway: River Kennet
- Country: England
- County: Berkshire
- Maintained by: Canal & River Trust
- Operation: Manual
- First built: 1718–1723
- Latest built: 1966
- Fall: 4 ft 1 in (1.24 m)
- Distance to River Thames: 6 mi 5 furlongs (11 km)

Sulhamstead Lock is a lock on the River Kennet to the east of Sulhamstead in the English county of Berkshire.

Sulhamstead Lock was built between 1718 and 1723 under the supervision of the engineer John Hore of Newbury, and this stretch of the river is now administered by the Canal & River Trust as part of the Kennet Navigation. It has a change in level of 4 ft 1 in (1.24 m). The lock is 6 mi 5 furlongs (11 km) from the confluence with the River Thames.

The lock was rebuilt in 1966 by a collaboration involving staff from British Waterways and volunteer labour.

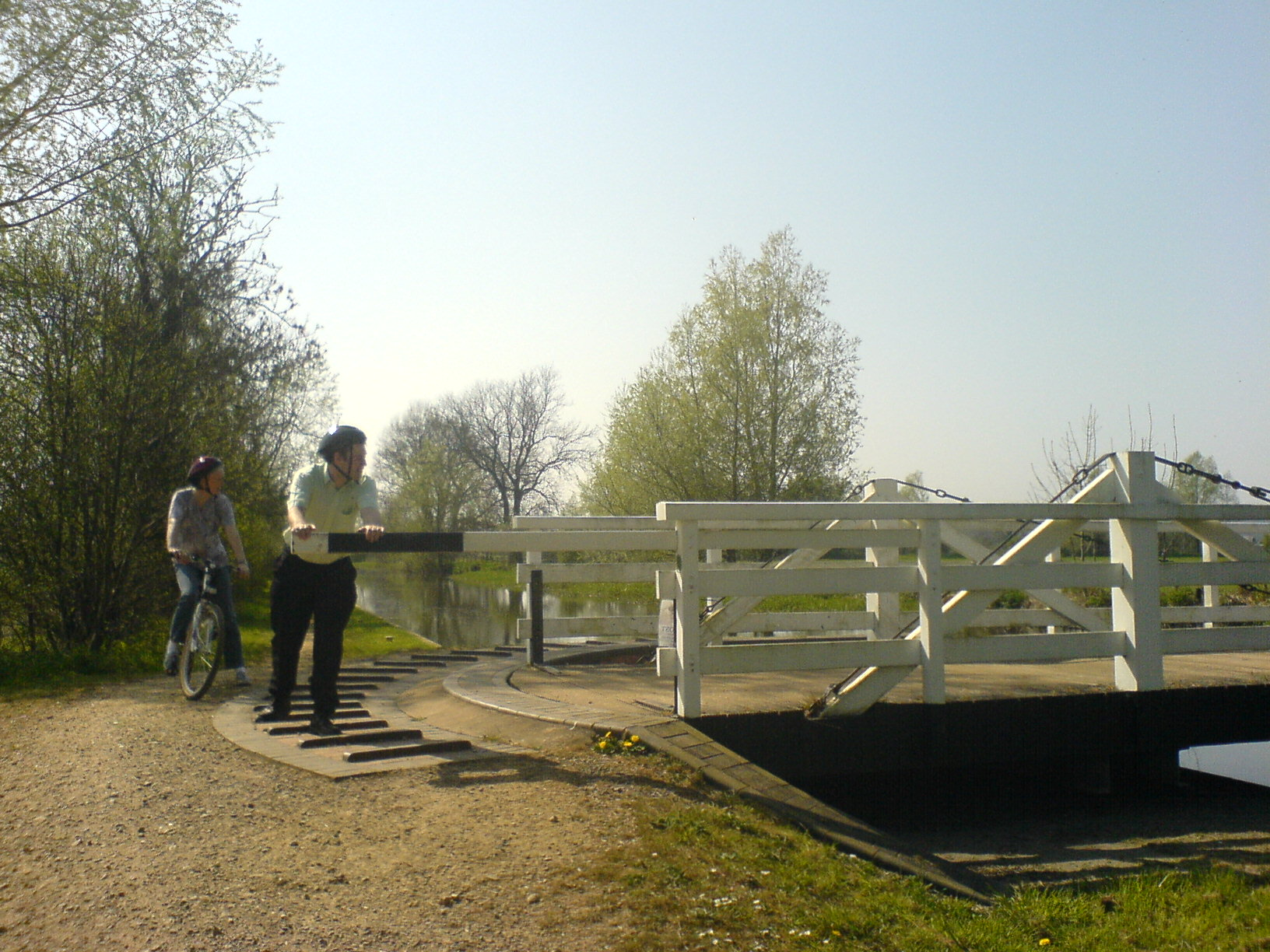
Sulhamstead Manually Operated Swing Bridge

== See also ==
- Locks on the Kennet and Avon Canal

Next lock upstream	River Kennet / Kennet and Avon Canal	Next lock downstream
Tyle Mill Lock	Sulhamstead Lock; Grid reference: SU637698	Sheffield Lock
