= Richard Perkins (scientist) =

Richard W. Perkins is a former scientist at the Hanford Site and the Pacific Northwest National Laboratory at Richland, Washington state.

His research included study of nuclear reactors and their effect on their environment, study of the ash from the eruption of Mount St. Helens, and Operation "Star Wars." He also worked with the first Moon rocks. Although too young to join, he joined the U.S navy to fight in WW2. He learned to use SONAR as part of his training in the navy. He was a member of the Church of Jesus Christ of Latter-day Saints. Perkins died December 29, 2016, at home at the age of 90.
