= Great Bidlake Manor =

Historic manor in Devon, England

Coordinates: 50.6780°N 4.1319°W

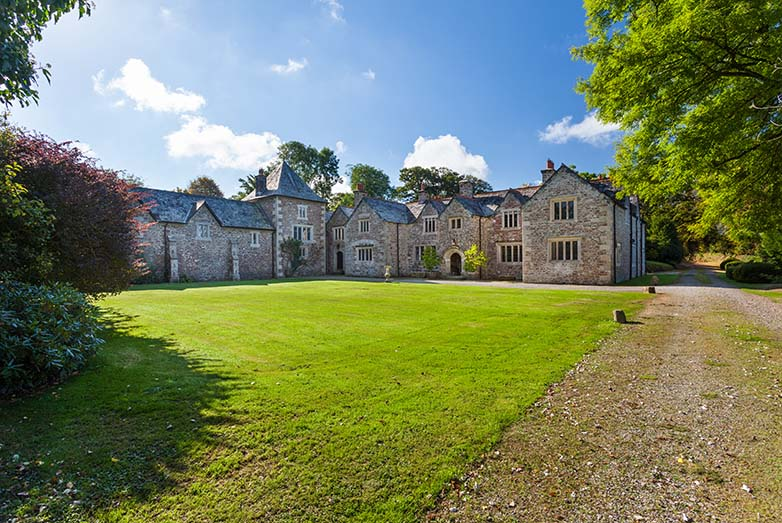
Great Bidlake Manor in 2018

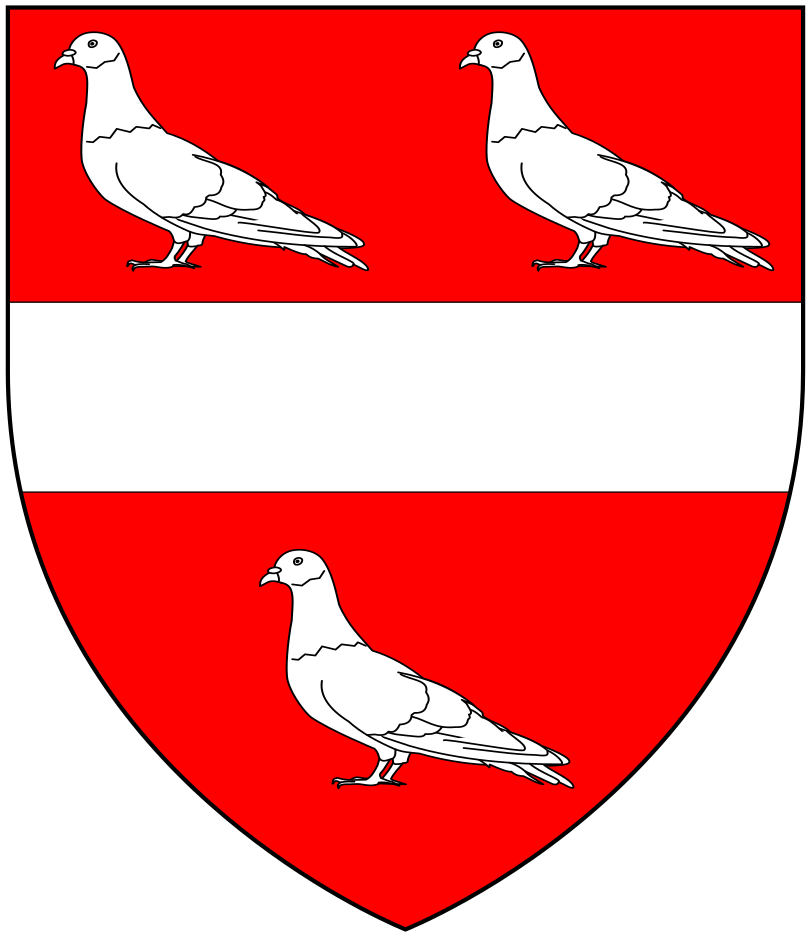
Bidlake family coat of arms

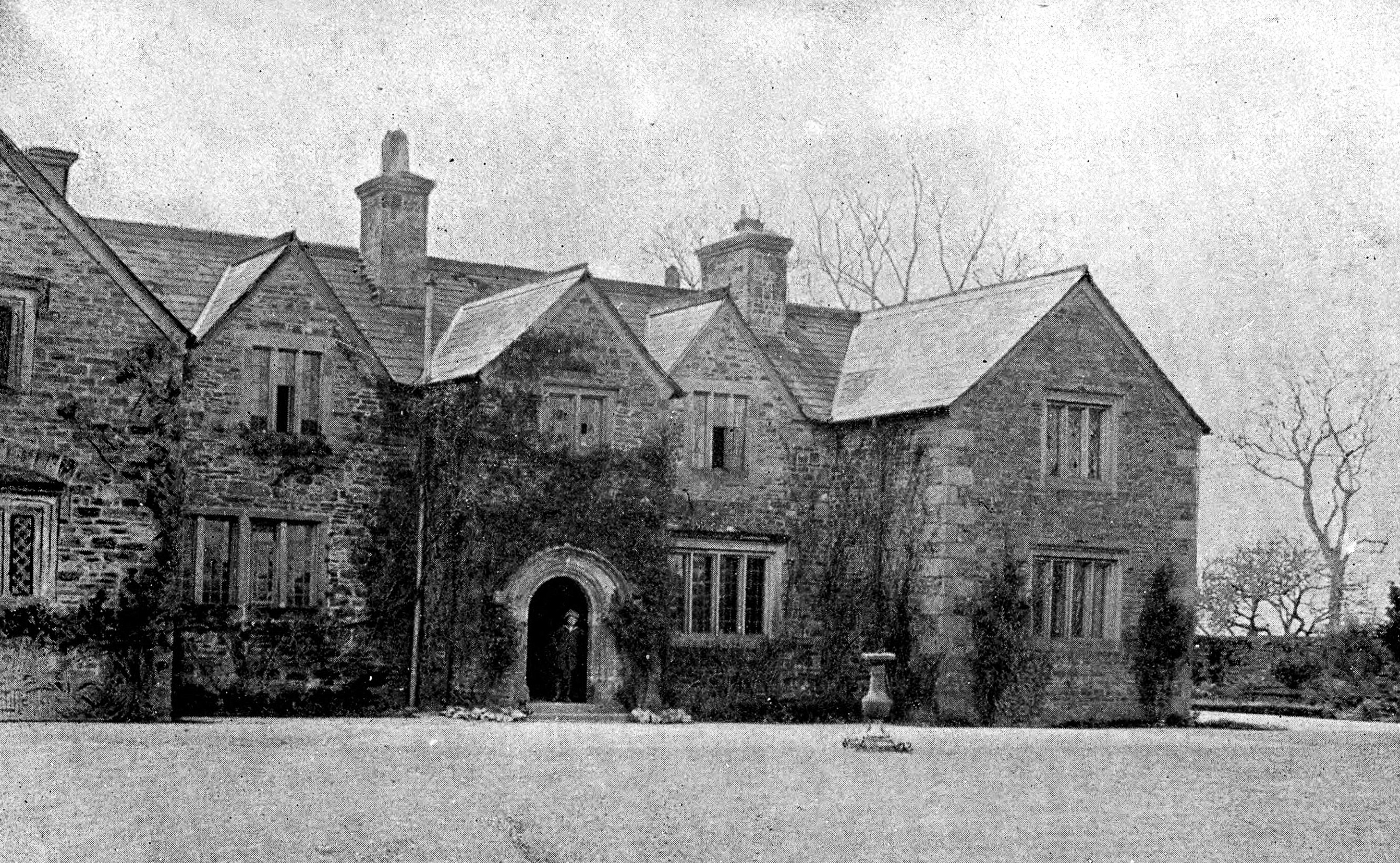
Bidlake in the early 20th century

Great Bidlake Manor is a manor house in the parish of Bridestowe on the north western edge of Dartmoor in the county of Devon, England. It has been listed Grade II* on the National Heritage List for England since November 1951.

It predominately dates from the 16th century though it has earlier origins, and despite extensive restoration in the 19th century and 21st century, its Elizabethan form is clear.

It has been the ancestral seat of the Bidlake family from the 13th century and, other than for a period of 68 years, has been owned by the family since then. The Bidlake family crest is described as "a cock holding in the beak a trefoil, all proper" and the family motto is "Virtute non astutia" (By excellence, not by cunning).

A deed dated 1268 marks the purchase of the Bidlake lands by Ralph la Riche de la Combe from Warren de Siccaville. After this his descendants took the name "Bidlake" which has been spelled many different ways over the centuries (Bydelacke, Bydlayke, Byddelake, Bidlocke, Bydlak, Bydelake, Bidlack and Bedlacke). A reference to Bydelak appears in a document of 1238 and the place-name derives either from a personal name, Bidda, with lacu meaning a small stream, or Byde may have been the name of the stream itself.

Bidlake Mill, once part of the Bidlake estate, is also mentioned in the original deed of 1268 and is scheduled as an Ancient Monument (of National importance) and is Grade II listed.

A description of the house in the time of Thomas Bidlake (1461–1531) mentions "the great parlour with its large chimneyplace, the Entry and Porch, and a room or 2 beyond that, and those with chambers over them, were already built and fully furnished". The fact that at this early date the house had chimneys and 1st floor rooms suggest its importance.

In the front wall of the house there is a reused mullion head with the date AD1594 and the initials "AB". In 2011 a total of 119 samples was taken from the timbers of the house and elsewhere and analysed in a report commissioned by English Heritage. Timbers from the breakfast room ceiling were dated to 1574, and from the adjacent hall to 1599.

Henry Bidlake (c.1612–1659), known to the family as "The Royalist", married Philippa Kelly, daughter of William Kelly of Kelly House, Devon, in 1633. On 2 July 1643 during the English Civil War he was made a captain of horse under Colonel Sir Thomas Hele and received orders to "seize horses, arms and furniture belonging to persons disaffected to this Majesty's Service". Charles I reputedly stayed at Great Bidlake on 30 July 1644.

In 1645 Henry took part in the siege of Pendennis Castle near Falmouth in Cornwall from where Queen Henrietta and Charles, Prince of Wales (the future King Charles II), escaped to France. A copy of the surrender articles of Pendennis Castle dated 18 August 1645 is amongst the Bidlake family papers in the Devon Record Office.

Sabine Baring-Gould's chapter on the Bidlakes of Bidlake in his book Devonshire Characters and Strange Events recounts several incidents from the life of Henry Bidlake including how hiding in a grandfather clock saved him from Oliver Cromwell's soldiers after the Battle of Torrington. Henry was heavily fined for his actions against parliament and significant parts of the Bidlake estate had to be sold off. Henry died in 1659, a few months before Charles returned from exile.

Christopher Bidlake (1661–1740) is the progenitor of the Bidlake/Bidlack family in America. He sailed to Ipswich, Massachusetts before 1692. He had a seat assigned to him in the meeting house in 1700, when his name was spelt Bedlock.

It was known as "Wester Bidlake" or simply "Bidlake" until Rev. John Henry Bidlake Wollocombe (who owned the estate between 1903 and his death in 1931) decided to call the house "Great Bidlake" and the name of a smaller house nearby was changed from "Easter Bidlake" to "Little Bidlake".

In the First World War, the farm at Great Bidlake was farmed entirely by women, a radical and controversial idea. Marlborough House School relocated from Kent to Great Bidlake between 1940 and 1945. In the large threshing barn on the estate the pupils created a mural of Noah's Ark that remains to this day.

Frederick Thomas Bidlake, a notable promoter and administrator of British road bicycle racing during the early 20th century and in whose memory the annual Bidlake Memorial Prize was instituted, was due to retire to Great Bidlake in 1933 but was involved in a collision with a car while riding down Barnett Hill north of London and died three weeks later.

In 2015, having undergone many years of extensive restoration, Great Bidlake was again under the ownership and stewardship of the Bidlake family and is available as a holiday let.

A collection of documents relating to Great Bidlake and the Bidlake family are held in the Devon Record Office.
