= Ufton Nervet =

Coordinates: 51.403°N 1.088°W

- Village and civil parish
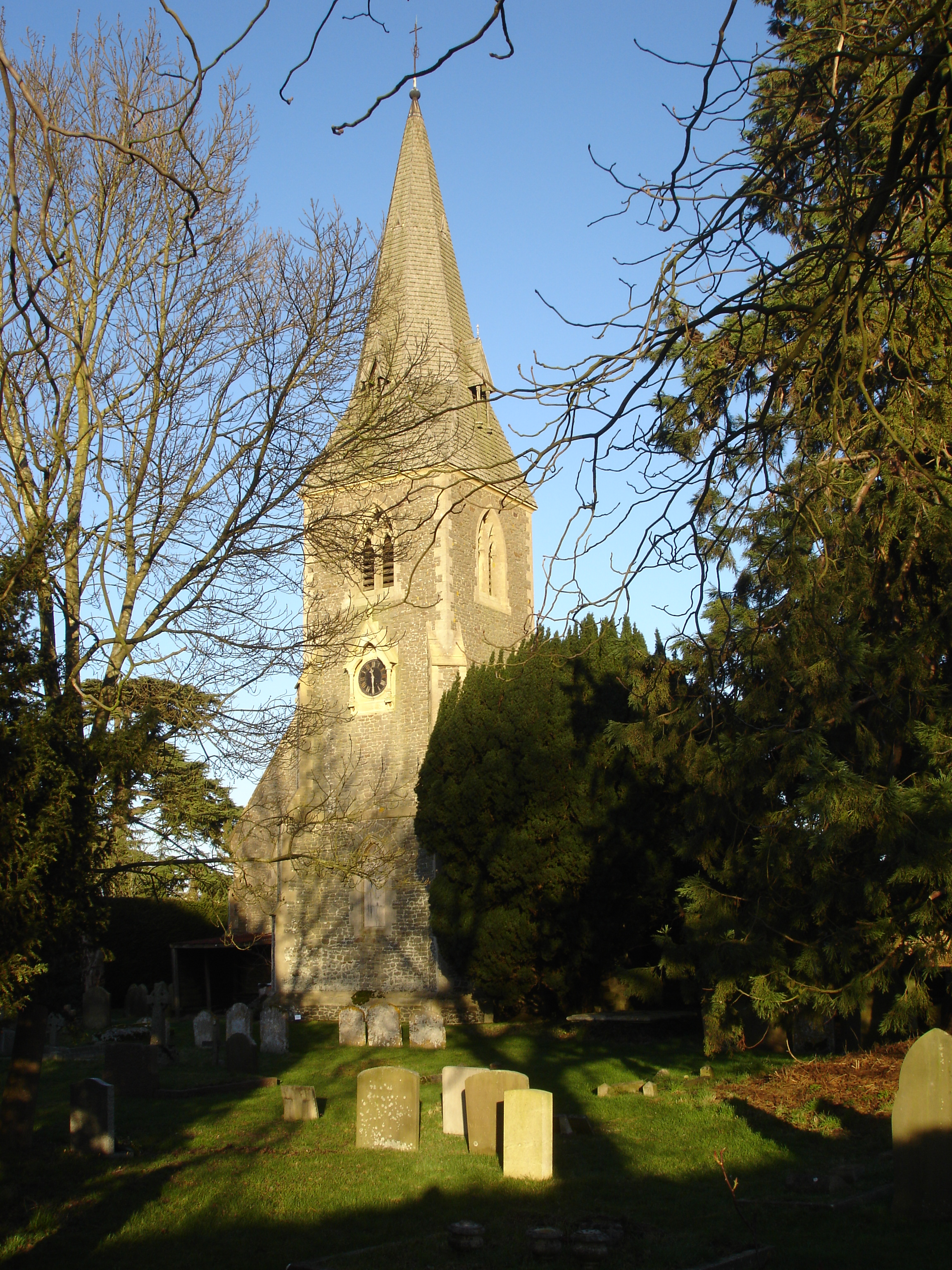
- The Spire, former parish church of St Peter

- Location within Berkshire
- Area: 6.48 km^{2} (2.50 sq mi)
- Population: 296 (2011 census)
  - Density: 46/km^{2} (120/sq mi)
- OS grid reference: SU6367
- Civil parish: Ufton Nervet
- Unitary authority: West Berkshire
- Ceremonial county: Berkshire
- Region: South East
- Country: England
- Sovereign state: United Kingdom
- Post town: Reading
- Postcode district: RG7
- Dialling code: 0118
- Police: Thames Valley
- Fire: Royal Berkshire
- Ambulance: South Central
- UK Parliament: Wokingham
- Website: Sulhamstead and Ufton Nervet

Ufton Nervet is a village and civil parish in West Berkshire, England centred 6 miles (10 km) west southwest of the large town of Reading and 7 miles east of Thatcham. Ufton Nervet has an elected civil parish council.

== Toponymy ==
"Ufton" is derived from the Old English Uffa-tūn = "Uffa's farmstead"; the Domesday Book of 1086 records it as Offetune.

== Geography ==
Ufton Nervet is a strip parish about 4.5 miles (7.2 km) long and up to 1 mile (1.6 km) wide, running roughly north-northwest – south-southeast between the Kennet valley and the crest of low hills in its south. It is bounded to the north by the A4 road, to the south by a minor road linking Burghfield and Tadley, and to the west and east by a mixture of field boundaries and minor roads. It includes a section of the River Kennet, the Kennet Navigation and the railway between Reading and Taunton.

Ufton Nervet village is a nucleated village close to the parish's eastern boundary, less than a mile from Burghfield Common and Sulhamstead. Two minor roads link the village with the A4, crossing the canal and the railway line in the valley bottom. Both lanes cross the canal by swing bridges. The larger, Tyle Mill Road, passes through part of Sulhamstead and crosses the railway by a bridge. The smaller, Ufton Lane, passes through Ufton Green and used to cross the railway by a level crossing, replaced by a bridge in December 2016. Other lanes link the village with Burghfield Common, Sulhamstead Abbots and Mortimer. Its direct link with Padworth to the west is a footpath past Ufton Court; the only road links with Padworth are circuitous ones via the southern or northern edges of the parish.

== History ==
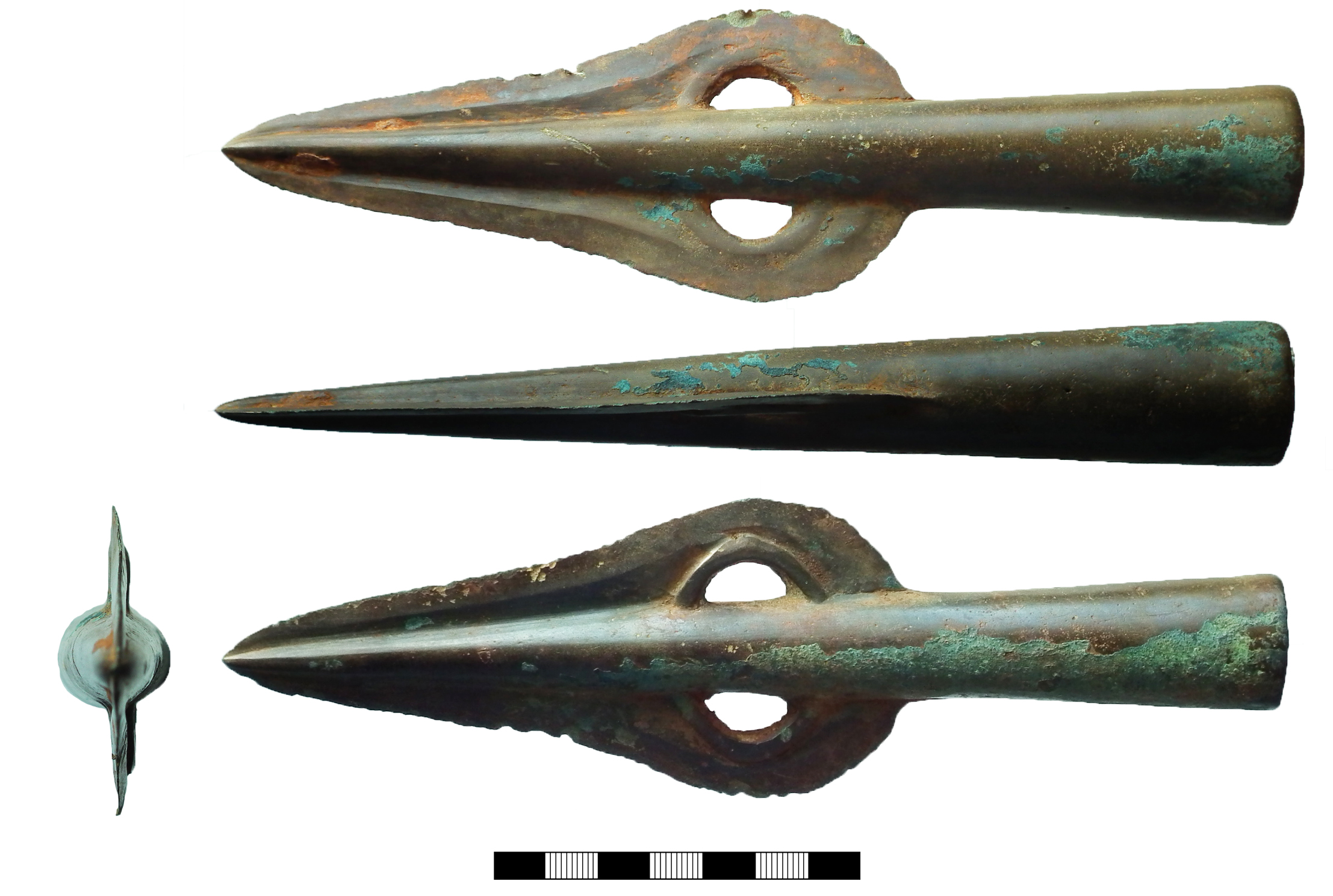
A Bronze Age spearhead, found in Ufton Nervet in 2007 and dated to c. 1100 – c. 900 BCE

=== Archaeology ===
Excavation of a site at Ufton Green found a number of scattered Mesolithic stone artefacts. They are interpreted as evidence of stone-working to make tools or weapons.

=== Manors ===
Three manors have existed in this area: Ufton Robert, Ufton Nervet and Ufton Pole. The Domesday Book records the first two.

The original Ufton Nervet, also called Ufton Richard, was about 0.7 miles (1.1 km) northwest of the current village, at the current site of Ufton Green. It had its own parish church of St John the Baptist, the ruined west wall of which survives and is a scheduled monument. The place was named after Richard Neyrvut, later corrupted to Nervet, who held the manor in the 13th century.

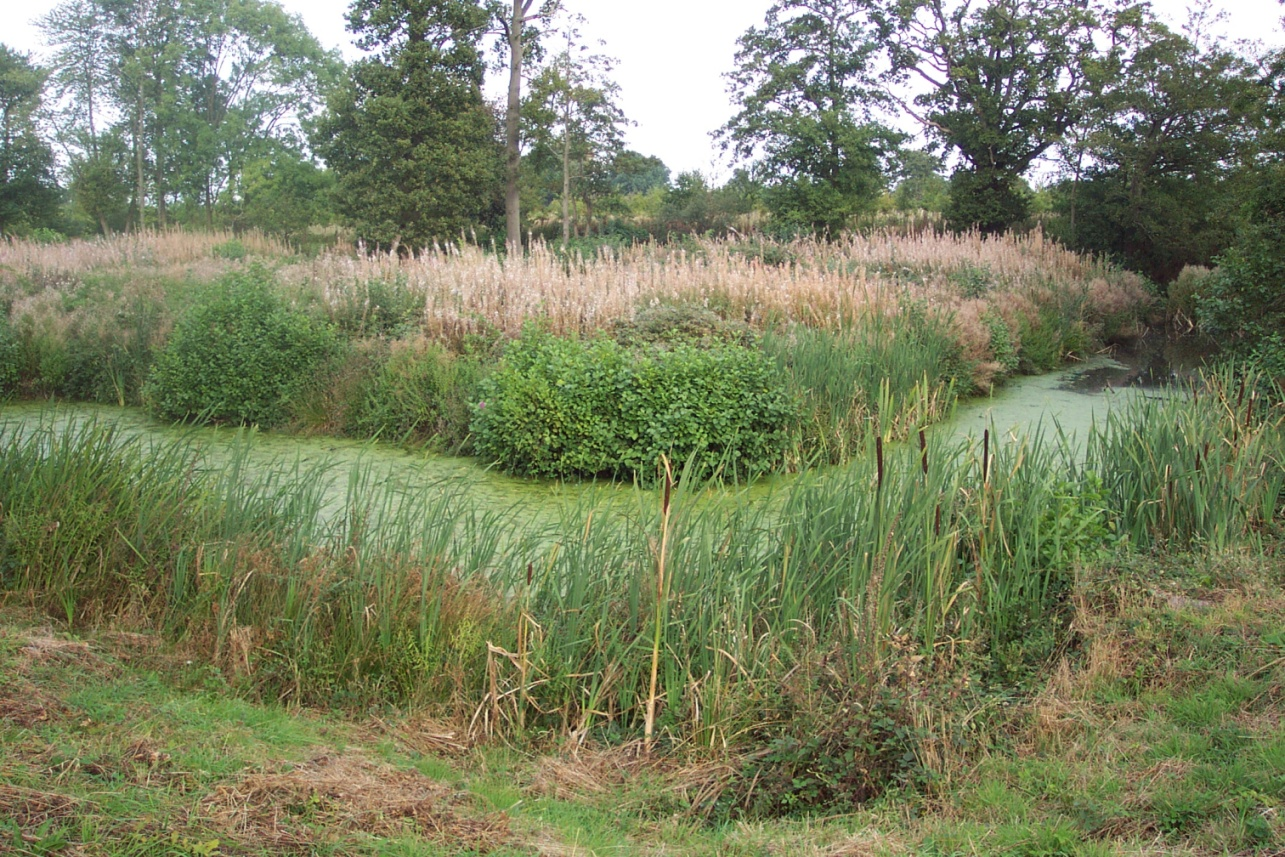
Moat of the former Ufton Robert manor house

Ufton Robert manor house was just west of the current village. Its moat and a set of three medieval fishponds survive and are also a scheduled monument. An artificial stream, controlled by a set of sluices, fed the moat and ponds. Excavations in the 19th century found bridge piles, a gateway and other foundations.

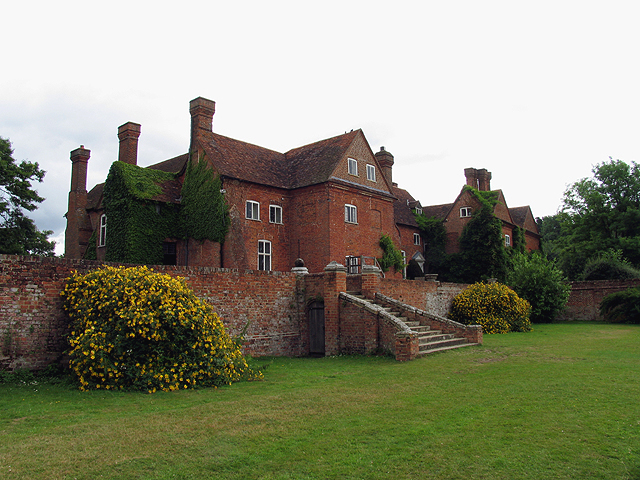
Ufton Court

The Perkyns family held the manor from about 1411. When they bought the manor of Ufton Pole in 1560 they merged the two manors and moved the main residence to Ufton Pole. This is now Ufton Court, a large Elizabethan manor house about 0.6 miles (1 km) southwest of the village. The house was built in about 1568, altered in the 17th and 18th centuries, restored in 1838 and is now a Grade I listed building.

In 1434–35 the parishes of Ufton Nervet and Ufton Robert were merged and Ufton Robert's parish church of St Peter was made the church of the merged parish. Although the original parish of Ufton Nervet had ceased to exist, this eventually became the name of the current village and parish. After the merger, Ufton Robert's parish church of St John the Baptist fell into decay, but its west wall survived by being adopted as the dividing wall between two cottages. In 1886 the cottages were demolished, re-exposing the west wall which now stands isolated in a pasture.

=== Former parish church, The Spire ===
In 1720 Oriel College, Oxford, bought the advowson of Ufton Nervet. Some eminent fellows of the college went on to serve as rectors of the parish, including Henry Beeke (1789-1819, botanist and creator of income tax), James Fraser (1860-1870, future Bishop of Manchester), and Thomas Brooking Cornish (1878-1906, former headmaster of the King's School, Macclesfield).

The Church of England parish church of Saint Peter was built in 1862 on the site of an earlier church. It is a Gothic Revival rendition of 14th-century Decorated Gothic. The walls are predominantly rag-stone with ashlar dressings. It has a chancel, north chapel (used as an organ chamber), nave of three bays, west tower with tall octagonal shingled spire, and south porch. In front of the porch is a mature yew tree.

The church has been redundant since the 1990s, and the building now operates as a community centre and Scout venue under the name The Spire. The ecclesiastical parish church is today that of St Mary's Sulhamstead Abbots and Bannister with Ufton Nervet, located to the east of Ufton Nervet.

The Spire contains church monuments salvaged from the medieval church. They include one to Richard Perkins (died 1560) with Corinthian columns, one to Francis and Anna Perkyns (died 1615–16 and 1635) with recumbent effigies and a brass to William and Constantia Smith (died 1627 and 1610). The Spire has stained glass windows from two London makers: Charles Clutterbuck and Lavers and Barraud.

== Transport ==
The River Kennet flows through the north of the parish. Between 1718 and 1723 it was made navigable by digging a series of cuts controlled by locks. One 3-mile (5 km) cut starts about 1 mile (1.6 km) downstream from Aldermaston and ends at Ufton Bridge, where it was controlled by Ufton Lock. The lock gates have now been removed but the lock chamber survives. Between 1794 and 1810 the Kennet and Avon Canal was built from Newbury to Bath. The Kennet Navigation is now managed as part of the canal.

The Berkshire section of the Berks and Hants Railway from Reading to Hungerford was built through the north of the parish and opened in 1847. The nearest station is Aldermaston, 3.5 miles (5.6 km) by road.

=== Rail crash ===
The Ufton Nervet crash took place in the parish on 6 November 2004. Seven people were killed and 70 injured when the 17:35 1C92 from London Paddington to Plymouth was partially derailed by colliding with a stationary car on the level crossing, before subsequently passing over a set of points for the Down Goods Loop at Towney, causing a major derailment. The inquest concluded that the car driver, who was killed in the collision, committed suicide.

Road deaths at the crossing after the major crash in 2004 have followed in 2009, 2010, 2012 and 2014, bringing the total number of fatalities to eleven.

On 18 April 2016, work began on constructing a single-carriageway bridge over the railway, at a cost of £7 million. It was completed and opened on 16 December 2016.

== Sources ==
- Page, W.H.; Ditchfield, P.H., eds. (1923). A History of the County of Berkshire. Victoria County History. Vol. 3. assisted by John Hautenville Cope. London: The St Katherine Press. pp. 437–444.
- Pevsner, Nikolaus (1966). Berkshire. The Buildings of England. Harmondsworth: Penguin Books. p. 246.
- Sharp, Mary (1892). The History of Ufton Court (PDF). London: Elliot Stock.
