= Francis Gosling =

English banker and alderman (1719–1768)

- Born: December 8, 1719; London, England
- Died: 1768 (aged 48–49); London, England
- Occupations: Banker and Alderman
- Known for: Partner in Goslings Bank
- Spouse: Elizabeth née Midwinter (m. 1742)

Sir Francis Gosling (1719–1768) was a partner in Goslings Bank, later Goslings and Sharpe, one of the banks merged into Barclays Bank in 1896. He was an Alderman of the City of London.

== Early life ==
Francis was born in London on 8 December 1719, the son of Robert Gosling (1684–1741) and Elizabeth née Douce (1692–1729). Robert Gosling was a stationer and bookseller at the Middle Temple Gate.

== Career ==
He was apprenticed to his father and worked as a bookseller and printer from before 1741 to 1757. In 1742 Francis became a partner in a bank founded by Henry Pinckney, a goldsmith banker c1650 and changed the name to Goslings Bank, continuing to trade under the sign of three squirrels at what became No 19 Fleet Street, London.

He was elected Alderman of the ward of Farringdon without in 1756; was Sheriff of London and Middlesex in 1758. He was knighted by George III on 28 October 1760 when the Lord Mayor and Aldermen waited upon the newly proclaimed king at Saville House. Sir Francis was the next in rotation for election to Lord Mayor of London in 1766 but declined due to his ill-health, Sir Robert Kite was elected in his place.

== Family ==
On 12 November 1742, in Gray's Inn Chapel, Francis married Elizabeth née Midwinter (1724–1806), a daughter of the late Edward Midwinter (1680–1736), printer and bookseller. Consent to her marriage was given by John Osborn and John Atkinson as testamentary guardians, though she lived with Samuel Richardson (1684–1761) and was pictured with him and his family by Francis Hayman.
