= Ufton Court =

Country house in Southern England

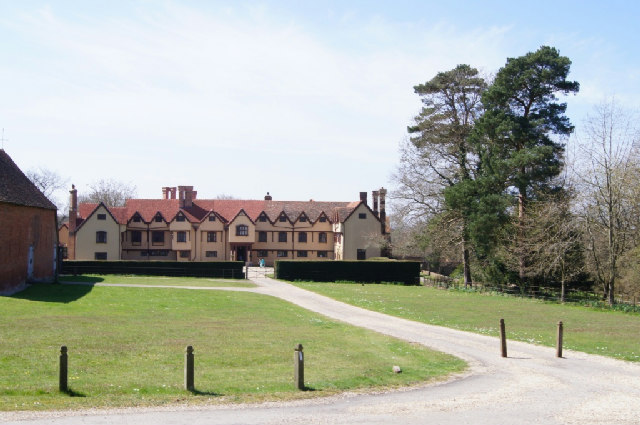
- Ufton Court

- Location within Berkshire

General information
- Architectural style: Elizabethan mansion
- Location: Ufton Nervet, Berkshire, United Kingdom
- Coordinates: 51.3962°N 1.1016°W
- Completed: 1474 / 1576 & 1616 (modifications)

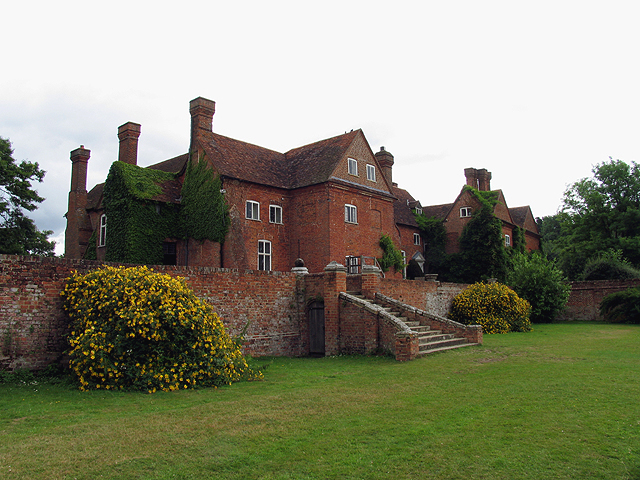
The rear of Ufton Court at Ufton Nervet.

Ufton Court is a manor house in the civil parish of Ufton Nervet, in the county of Berkshire, England. It is run by children's experiential education charity The Ufton Court Educational Trust, and also operates as a wedding and corporate event venue.

== Architecture ==
Historic England describe Ufton architecturally as:

Late C15, circa 1568, altered and partly refaced in late C17, further altered in C18, and whole restored in circa 1838 with some later alterations. Rendered timber frame with red brick refacing to rear, some brick additions, and old tile roof, in 2 ranges to left. Large irregular E-plan with central projecting gabled 2 storey porch and flanking projecting gabled wings. 2½ storeys. Entrance front: each floor jettied with moulded bressumers and brackets, and gabled eaves dormers with 3-light leaded casements, barge boards, and lead water spouts between with flanges inscribed 1664 FP.

The great hall and the screens passage (complete with the original 'pantry and buttery' doors) date from 1474. Lady Elizabeth Marvyn modified and extended the house in 1568, with the installation of a "pendant ceiling" in the original great hall. Two carved beams which she had installed in the Green Room are thought to be older and may have been brought from her former residence nearby.

Lady Marvyn was a prominent Roman Catholic, and the house is noted for its priest holes where recusant Catholics could hide priests. An east wing and a Catholic panel was added in 1616.

The house was further altered in the early eighteenth century.

== History ==
=== Late Medieval ===
A small medieval manor named Ufton Pole originally stood on the site, belonging to Francis Lovell. Lovell was created the 1st Viscount Lovell by Edward IV, after being a ward to the latter as a child. Lovell became a friend of Richard III, with both of their wives being first-cousins. With the death of Richard III in 1485, Lovell rebelled against the new king, Henry VII and had his lands, including Ufton Pole, confiscated by the Crown, who now possessed Ufton.

=== Tudor and Stuart ===
Henry VIII granted Ufton Pole Manor to Sir Richard Weston, a Groom of the Chamber, in 1510.

In 1568, the house was bought by Lady Marvyn, the widow of Richard Perkins of nearby estate on Ufton Green. She considerably altered and enlarged the house over the next eight years and renamed it 'Ufton Court'. She eventually left the house to her first husband's nephew, Francis Perkins. It remained in this family until 1769.

The Perkins were persecuted for their Catholic beliefs. They had to pay fines for not attending Church of England services at the parish church and could be subjected to raids at any time by local magistrates looking for priests, hidden in tiny secret rooms. In 1599, during the second raid on Ufton, Sir Francis Knollys discovered at least one priest hole containing much gold plate, but the priests were not in residence.

=== Georgian ===
In 1715, Francis Perkins of Ufton Court married Arabella Fermor, the daughter of Henry Fermor of Tusmore in Oxfordshire.

Before the marriage, painters and poets celebrated her charms and her beauty, for she was the belle of London society. She is remembered today as the inspiration for Alexander Pope's 'The Rape of the Lock,' a poem telling how Lord Petre stole a lock of her hair and caused a great scandal. Arabella was humiliated and accepted Perkins' offer of marriage in order to live quietly in the country instead. Tradition asserts that the great hall and western half of Ufton Court were refashioned for the lady's arrival, and this seems to fit with the date of the architecture and interior décor there. Bonnie Prince Charlie is supposed to have secretly visited the couple during the Jacobite rising of 1745. They had six children together, but they all died childless and the house gradually fell into a state of disrepair.

=== Victorian times ===
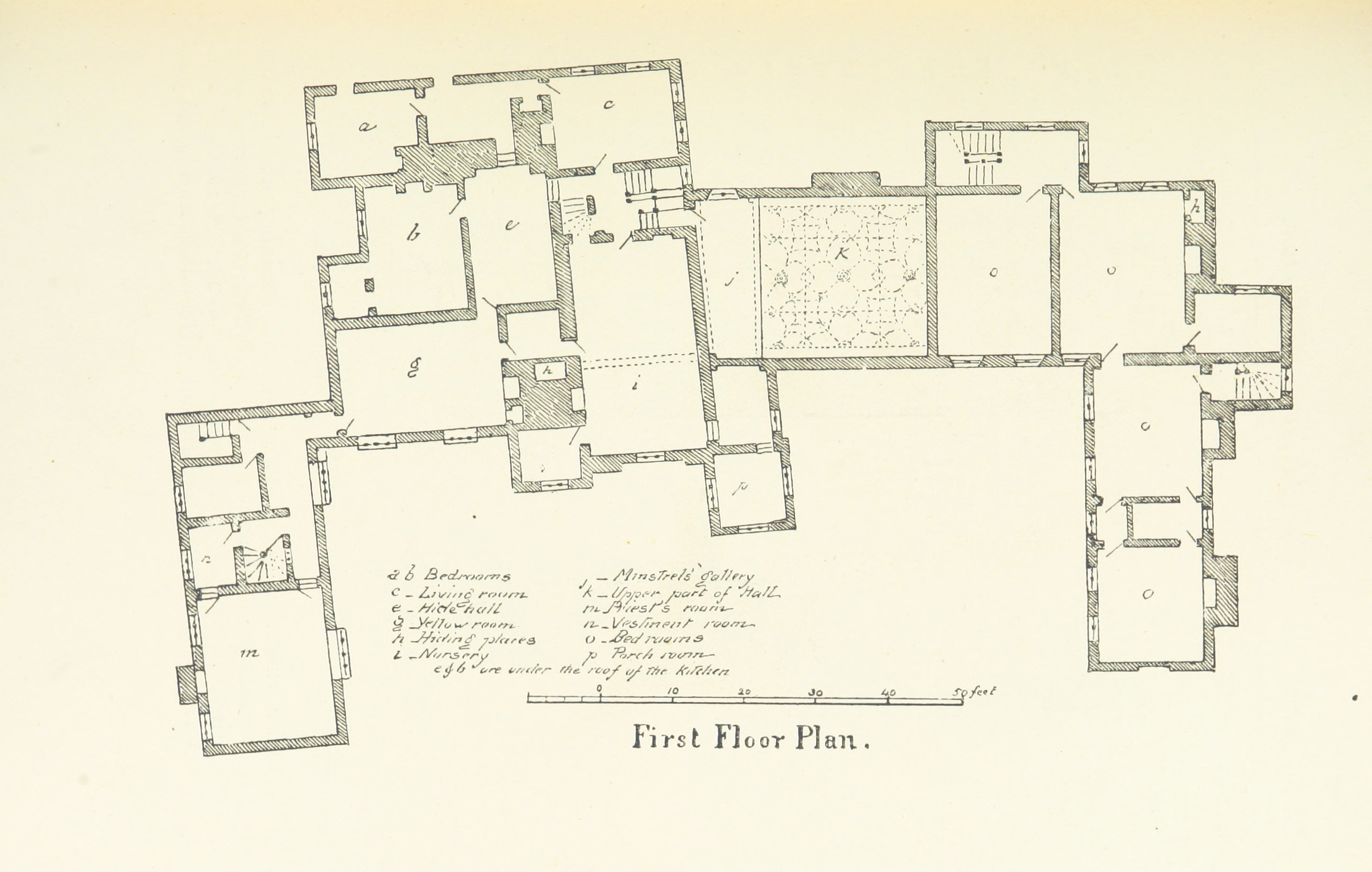
Floor plan

During its sale in 1837, Ufton Court was described as 'unfit for a gentleman's residence.' It was bought by Richard Benyon De Beauvoir of the adjoining estate at Englefield. He repaired the house and converted it into tenements for his estate workers.

Over the next hundred years, various tenants lived in the house: mostly notably Mary Sharp, a local historian who wrote a detailed history of the place. Mr (later Sir) Henry Benyon also lived there himself before inheriting Englefield House, restoring the house as a gentleman's residence once more and replanting the garden.

== Educational Centre ==
Although still owned by the Benyons, Ufton Court is now the home of the Ufton Court Educational Trust. This charity provides opportunities for children and young people to explore the historical and environmental world through hands-on experiences. They host both day visits and residential visits. Many of the rooms are now dormitories and children are encouraged to treat the house as their own. Historical experiences range from studies of the Stone Age to the Elizabethan. The site includes a Tudor garden and small Saxon/Medieval/Tudor farm with pigs, goats and chickens to look after. The grounds include a recreated Viking Village, a Saxon Mead Hall, Multiple outdoor and covered fire circles, a Roman Settlement, Saxon/Viking ship; as well as the 'Ufton Adventure' woodland centre based around residential cabin accommodation.

== The Ufton Dole ==
During Lent every year, the lord of the manor (currently Lord Benyon) distributes bread and sheets from a window in the Great Hall of Ufton Court to the villagers of Ufton Nervet and Padworth.

Elizabeth Marvyn left the money for the Ufton Dole in her will of 1581, reportedly to thank the villagers for helping her return home after she became lost in the local woods. A curse is said to have been placed on any lord of the manor who breaks the tradition.

During the COVID-19 lockdown in 2020 one loaf was passed through the window in order to ensure the custom's continuity. This makes it the country's second longest continuously running dole after the Royal Maundy.
