= Openwork =

Artistic decoration using holes in solid materials

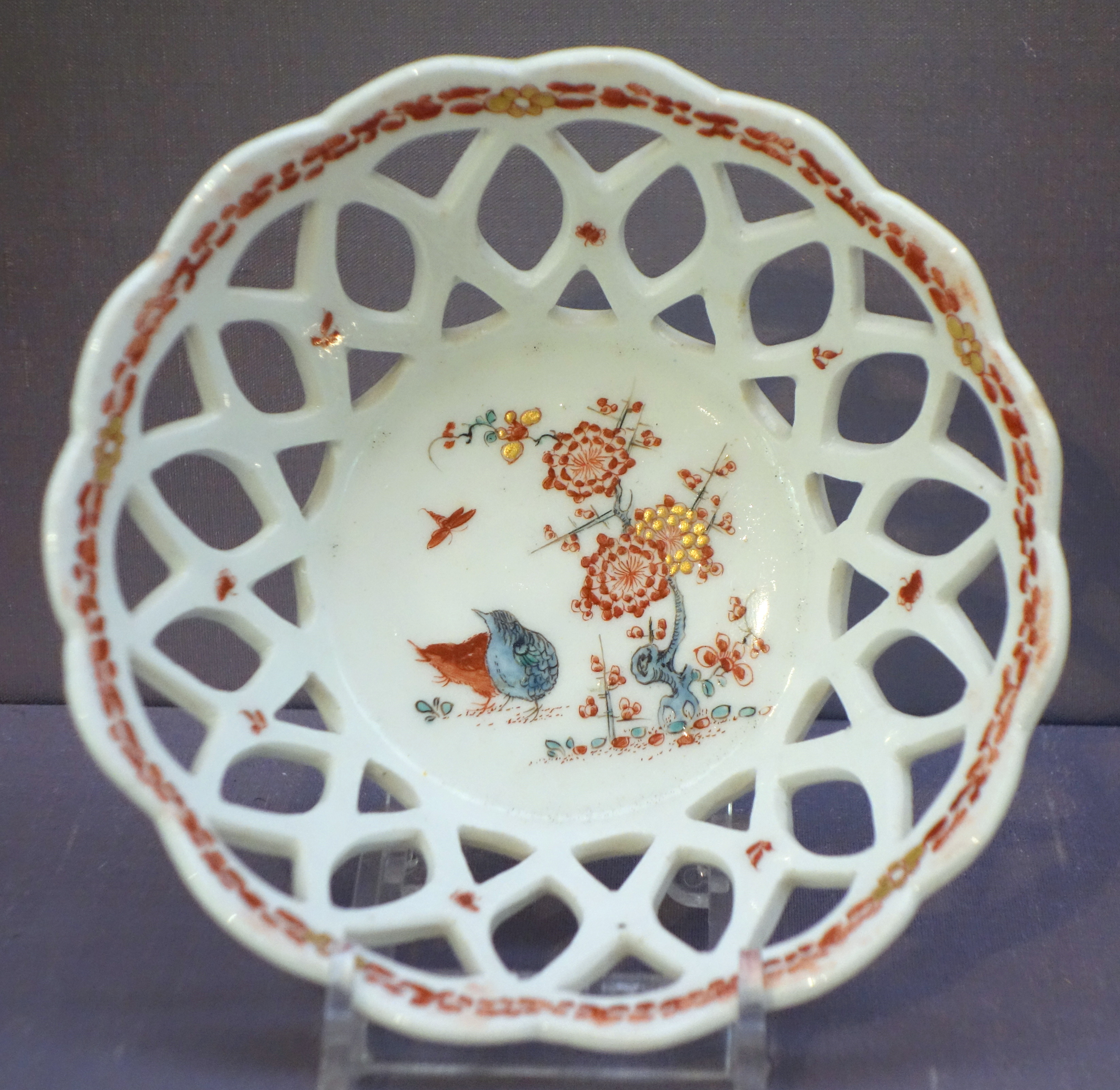
Openwork basket, English Bow porcelain, c. 1754–1755

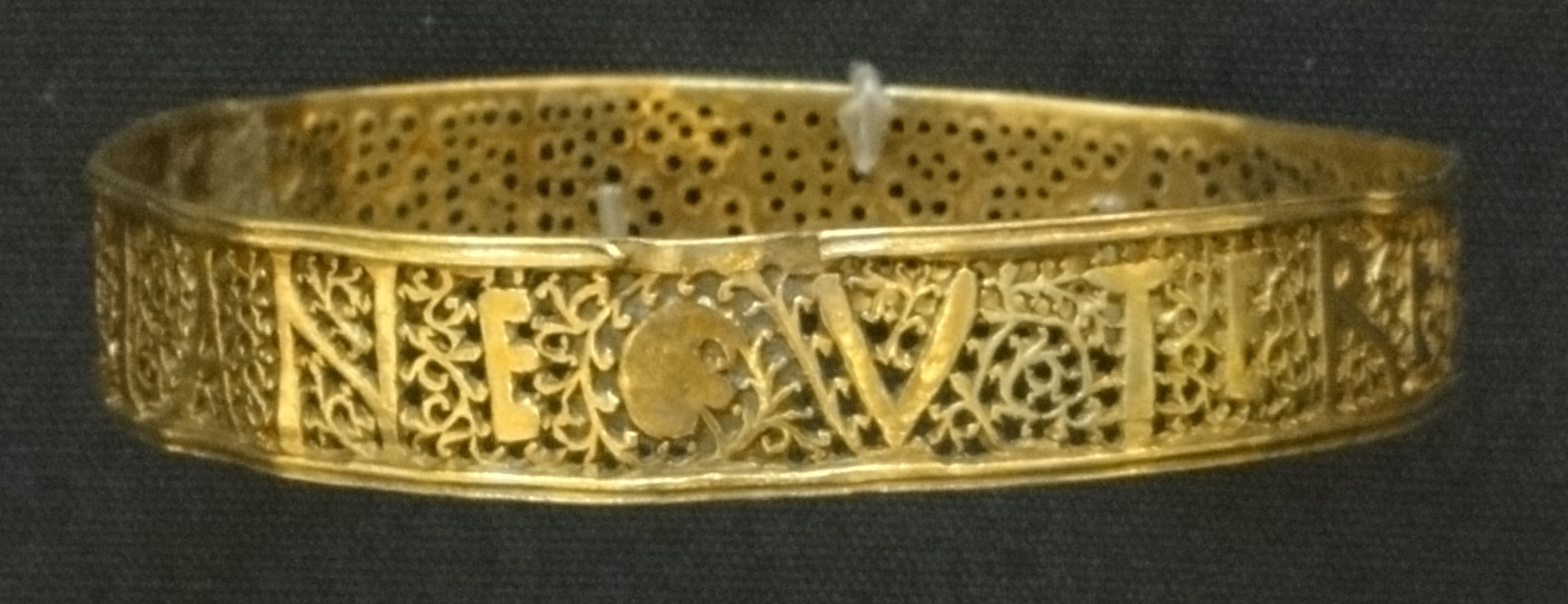
Ancient Roman gold bracelet from the Hoxne Hoard. JULIANE is spelled out in opus interrasile openwork.

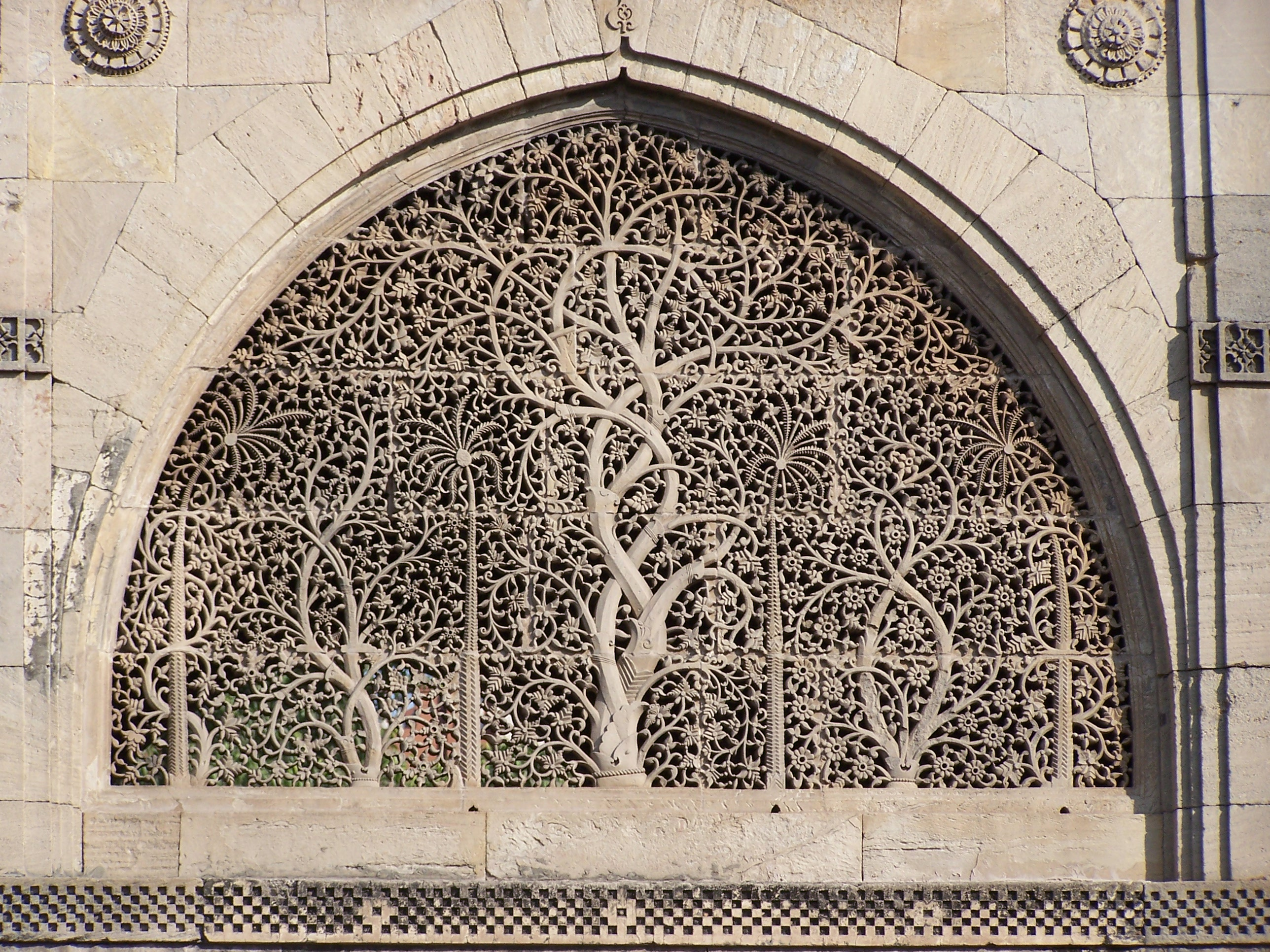
Intricate jalis from the Sidi Saiyyed mosque in Ahmedabad, India. From the inside

In art history, architecture, and related fields, openwork or open-work is any decorative technique that creates holes, piercings, or gaps through a solid material such as metal, wood, stone, pottery, cloth, leather, or ivory. Such techniques have been very widely used in a great number of cultures.

The term is rather flexible, and used both for additive techniques that build up the design, as for example most large features in architecture, and those that take a plain material and make cuts or holes in it. Equally techniques such as casting using moulds create the whole design in a single stage, and are common in openwork. Though much openwork relies for its effect on the viewer seeing right through the object, some pieces place a different material behind the openwork as a background.

== Varieties ==
Techniques or styles that normally use openwork include all the family of lace and cutwork types in textiles, including broderie anglaise and many others. Fretwork in wood is used for various types of objects. There has always been great use of openwork in jewellery, not least to save on expensive materials and weight. For example, opus interrasile is a type of decoration used in Ancient Roman and Byzantine jewellery, piercing thin strips of gold with punches. Other techniques used casting with moulds, or built up the design with wire or small strips of metal. Essentially flat objects are straightforward to cast using moulds of clay or other materials, and this technique was known in ancient China since before the Shang dynasty of c. 1600 to 1046 BC. On a larger scale in metal, wrought iron and cast iron decoration more often than not have involved openwork.

Scythian metalwork, which was typically worn on the person, or at least carried about by wagon, uses openwork heavily, probably partly to save weight. Sukashibori (roughly translating to "see-through work") is the Japanese term covering a number of openwork techniques, which have been very popular in Japanese art.

In ceramics, if objects such as sieves are excluded (openwork bases for these existed in the West from classical times), decorative openwork long remained mainly a feature of East Asian ceramics, with Korean ceramics especially fond of the technique from an early date. Frequently, these ceramics are double walled allowing the solid inner surface to still hold liquid.

There was little use of it in European ceramics before the 18th century, when designs, mostly using lattice panels, were popular in rococo ceramic "baskets", and later in English silver trays. Openwork sections can be made either by cutting into a conventional solid body before firing, or by building up using strips of clay, the latter often used when loose wickerwork is being imitated. In glass openwork is rather less common, but the spectacular Ancient Roman cage cups use it for a decorative outer layer.

Some types of objects naturally suit or even require openwork, which allows a flow of air through screens, censers or incense burners, pomanders, sprinklers, ventilation grilles and panels, and various parts of heating systems. For exterior screens openwork designs allow looking out, but not looking in. For gates and other types of screens, security is required, but visibility may also be wanted.

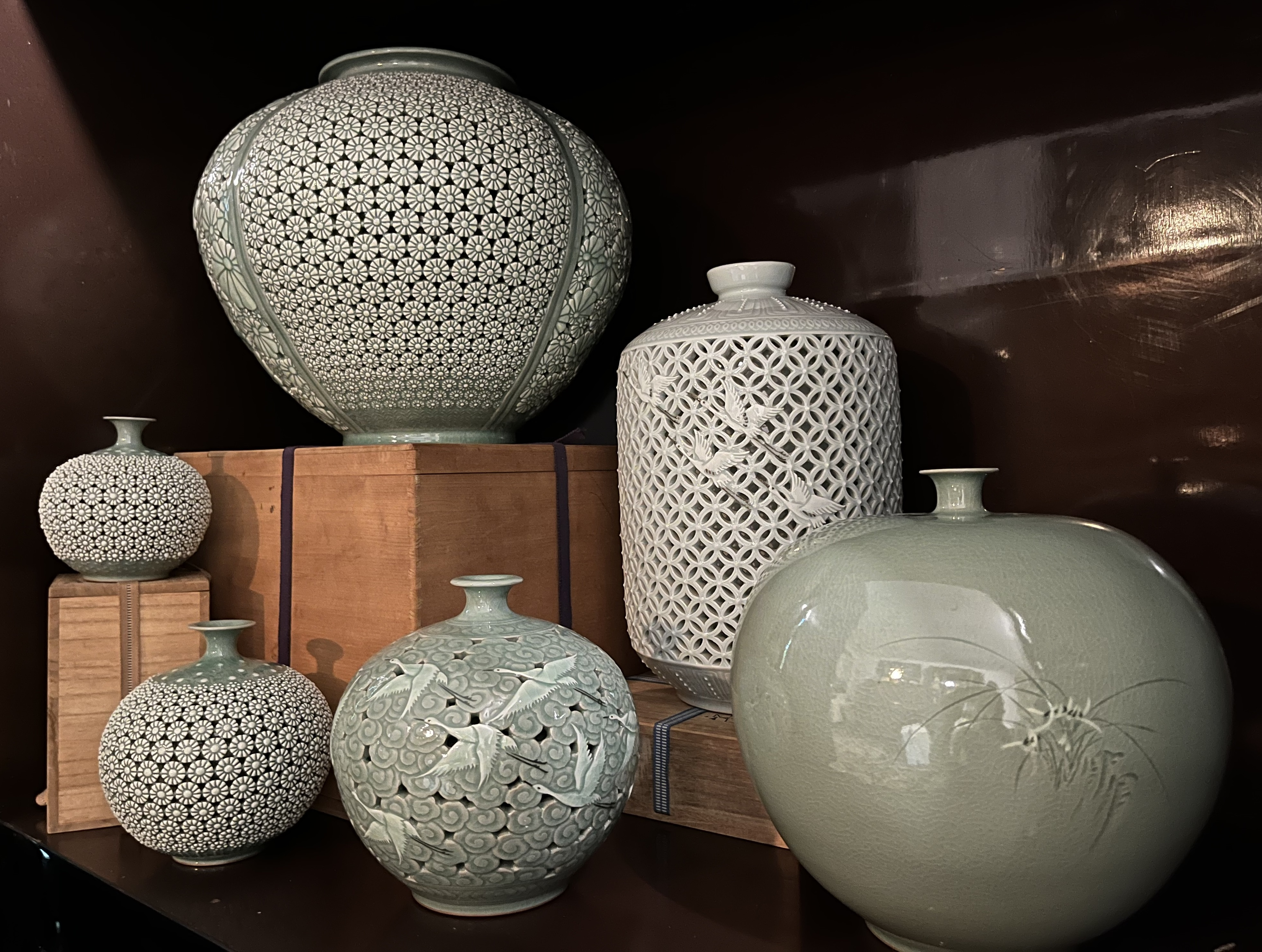
Collection of mostly double-open work celadon vases including moon jars

== Double-openwork and triple-openwork ==
The terms double-openwork and triple-openwork, also called reticulated, are typically associated with ceramic pieces that are created with two or three walls. Korean ceramicist Kim Se-yong produces openwork pieces.

== Architecture ==
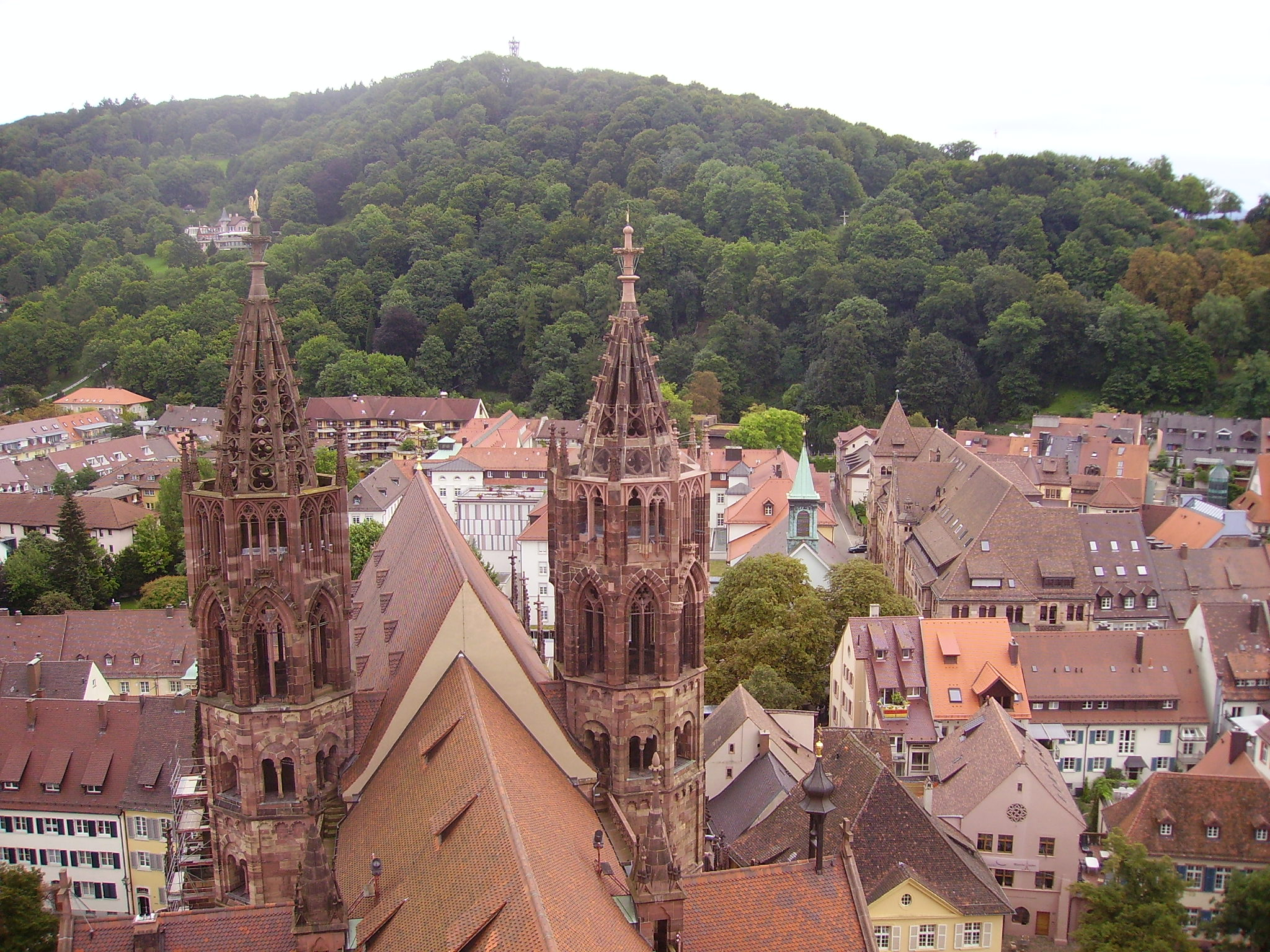
The secondary spires at Freiburg Minster

In architecture openwork takes many forms, including tracery, balustrades and parapets, as well as screens of many kinds. A variety of screen types especially common in the Islamic world include stone jali and equivalents in wood such as mashrabiya. Belfries and bell towers normally include open or semi-open elements to allow the sound to be heard at a distance, and these are often turned to decorative use. In Gothic architecture some entire spires are openwork. The later of the two spires on the West Front of Chartres Cathedral is very largely openwork. As well as stone and wood the range of materials includes brick, which may be used for windows, normally unglazed, and screens. Constructions such as the Eiffel Tower in Paris are also described as openwork. Here an openwork structure was crucial for the engineering, reducing not only weight but wind resistance.

Beginning with the early fourteenth-century spire at Freiburg Minster, in which the pierced stonework was held together by iron cramps, the openwork spire, according to Robert Bork, represents a "radical but logical extension of the Gothic tendency towards skeletal structure." The 18 openwork spires of Antoni Gaudi's Sagrada Família in Barcelona represent an outgrowth of this Gothic tendency. Designed and begun by Gaudi in 1884, they remained incomplete into the 21st century.

== Gallery ==
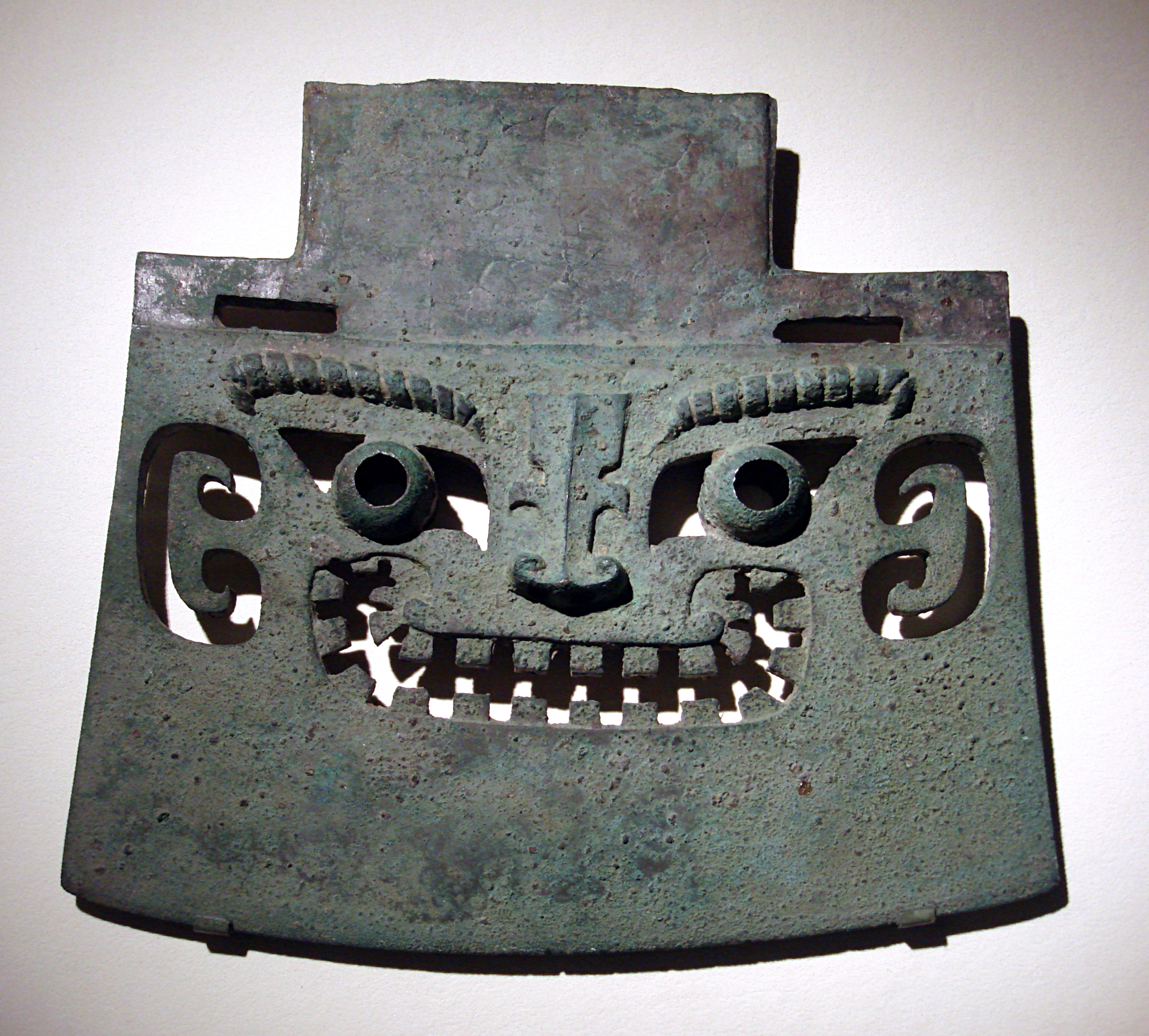
Chinese bronze axe head, Shang dynasty

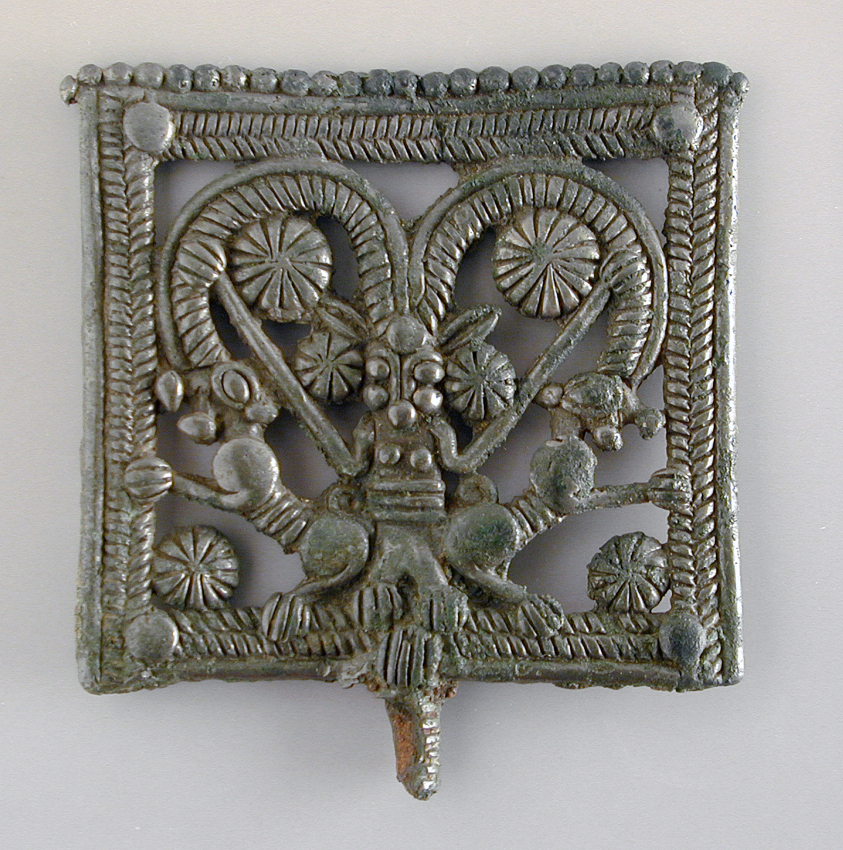
Cast Luristan bronze openwork pinhead, Iran, circa 1000–650 BC

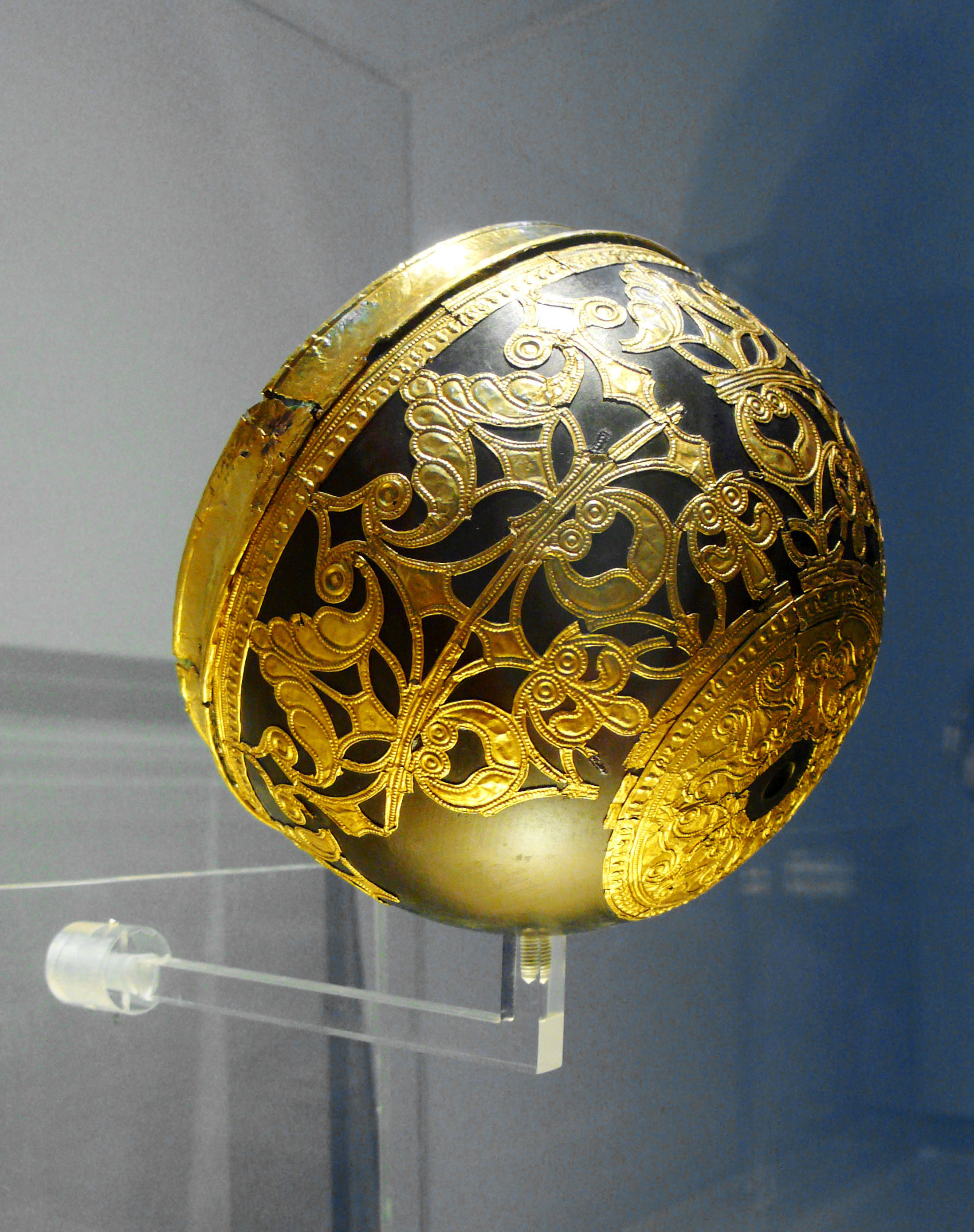
Celtic ornamental gold mounts, about 420 BC

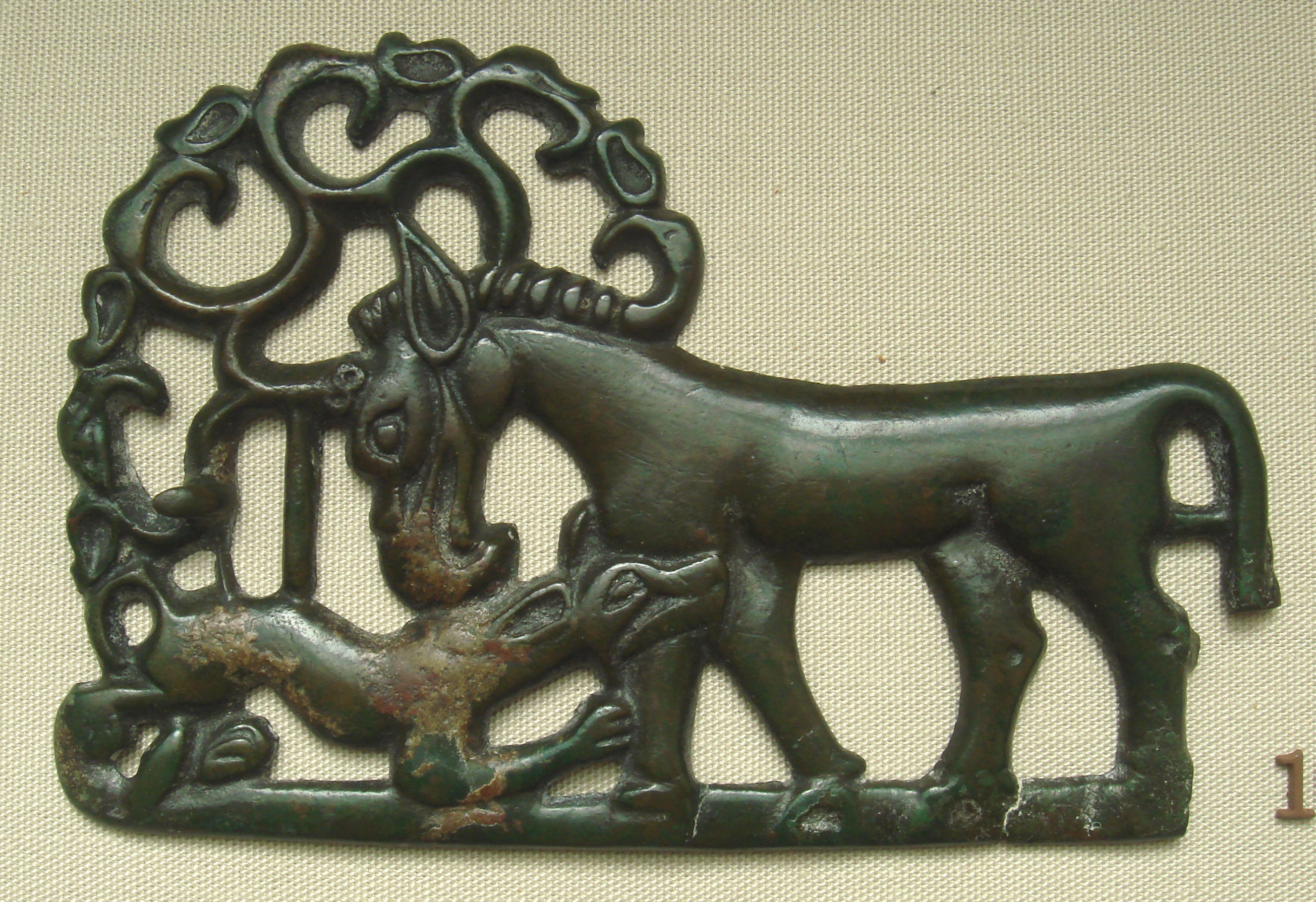
Bronze Ordos culture plaque, from the eastern end of Scythian art, 4th century BC; a deer attacked by a wolf

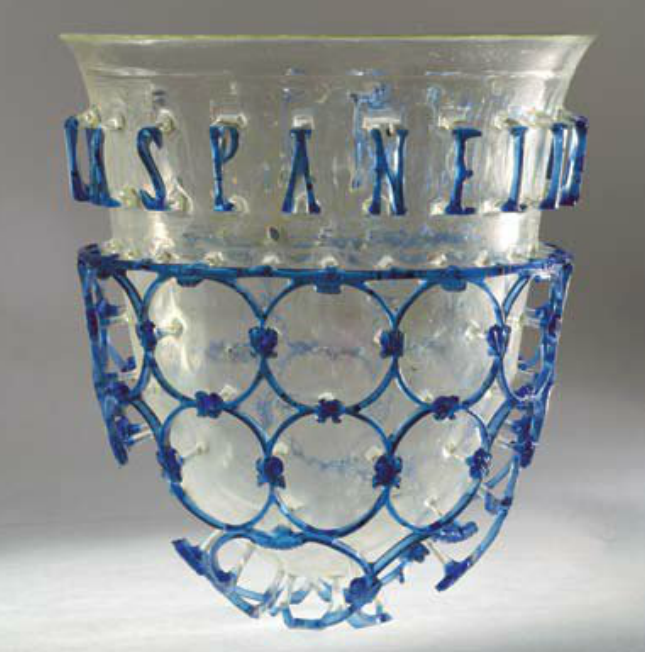
4th-century Roman glass cage cup found in Montenegro

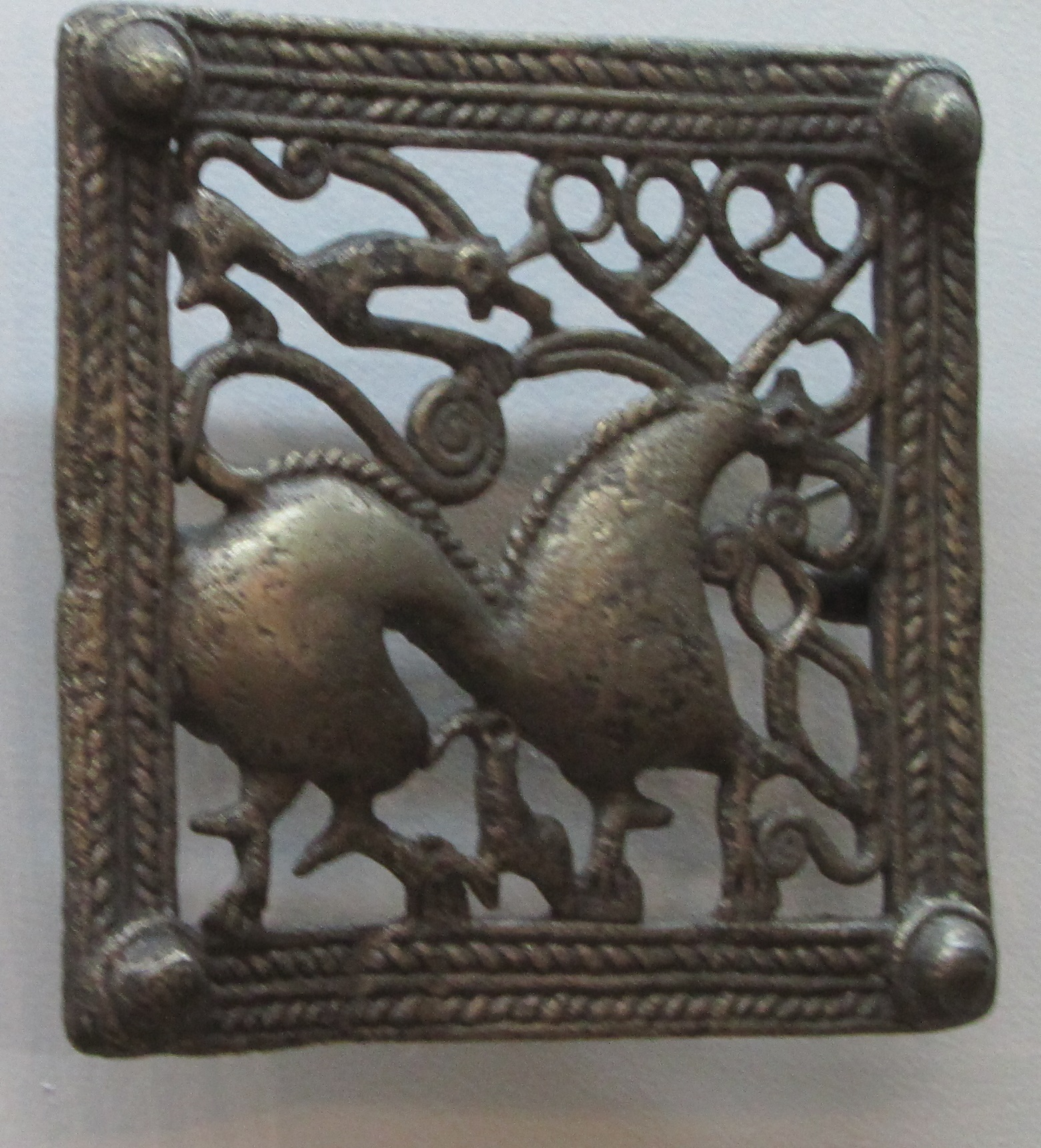
Bronze buckle, Georgian, 1st to 4th century AD

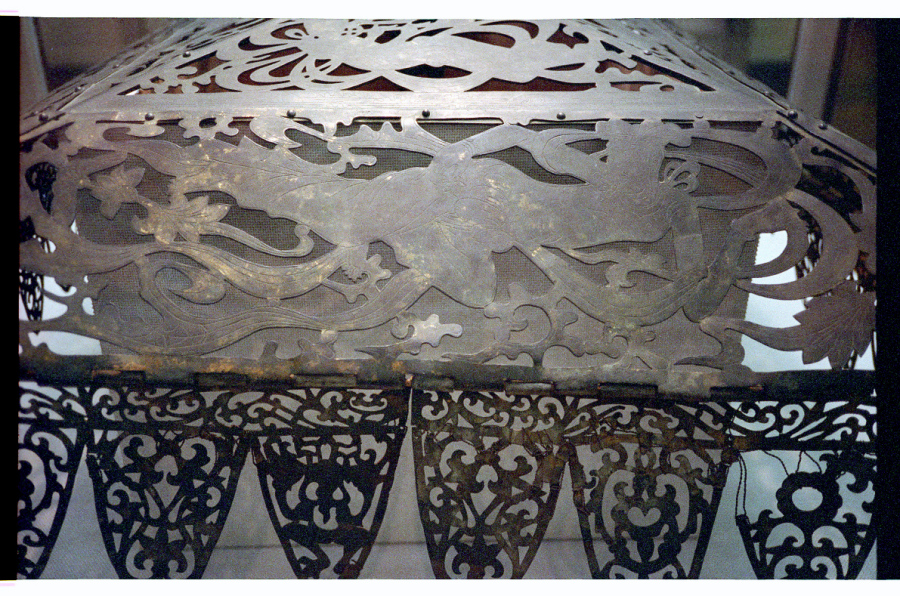
Japanese canopy ritual banner, gilt-bronze, 7th century

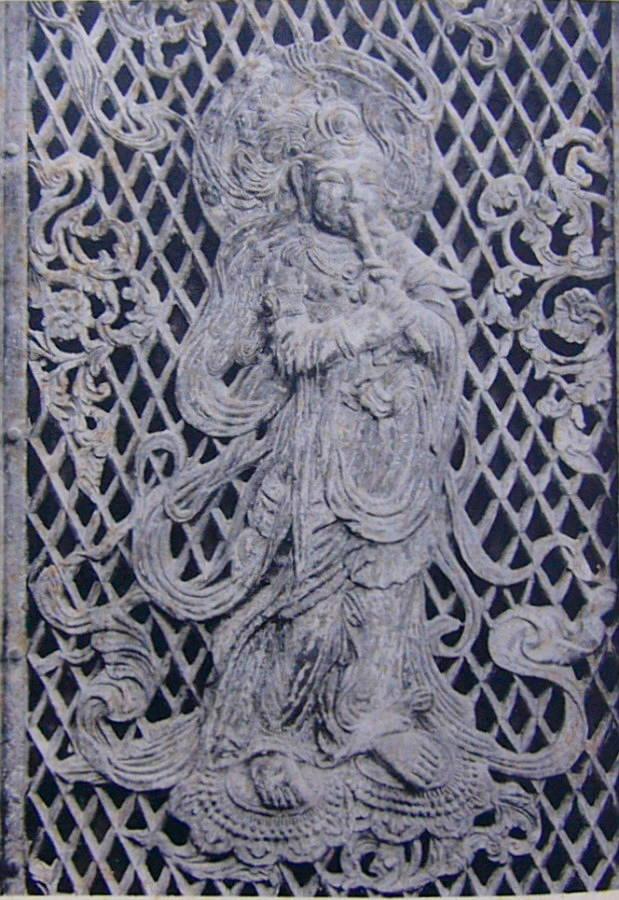
Tōdai-ji, 8th century

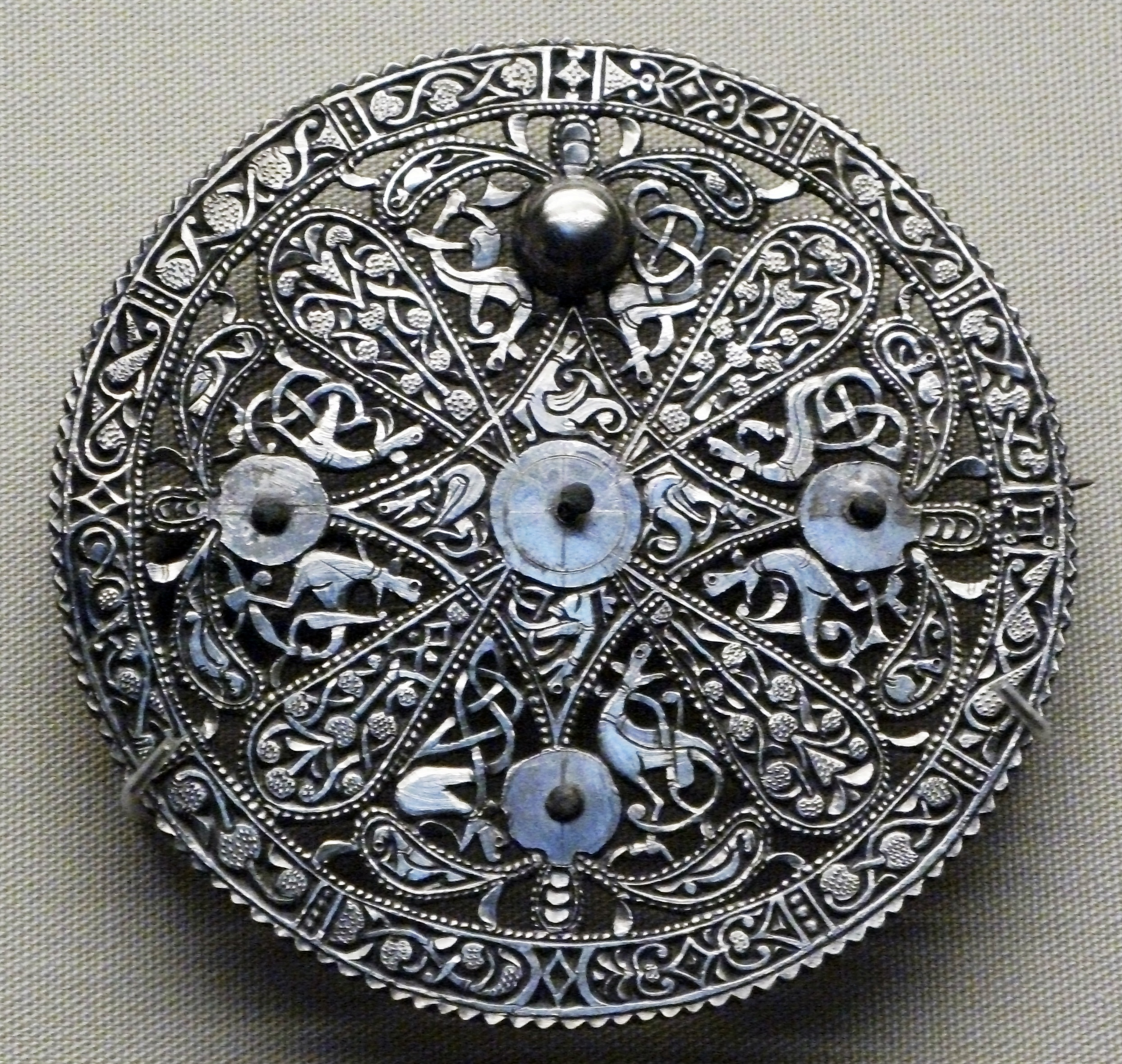
Anglo-Saxon brooch from the Pentney Hoard

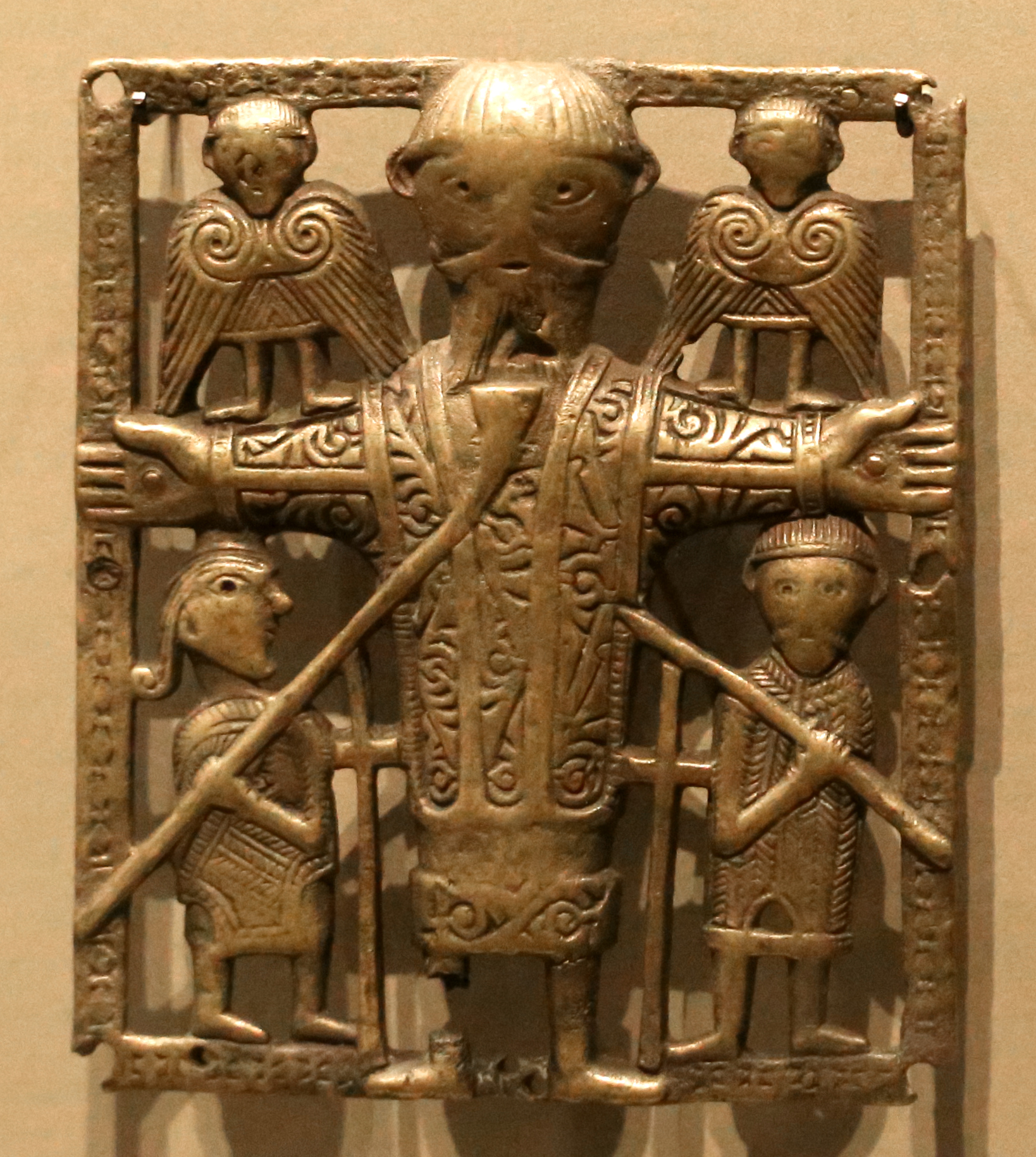
The Clonmacnoise Crucifixion Plaque, Irish, 10th century

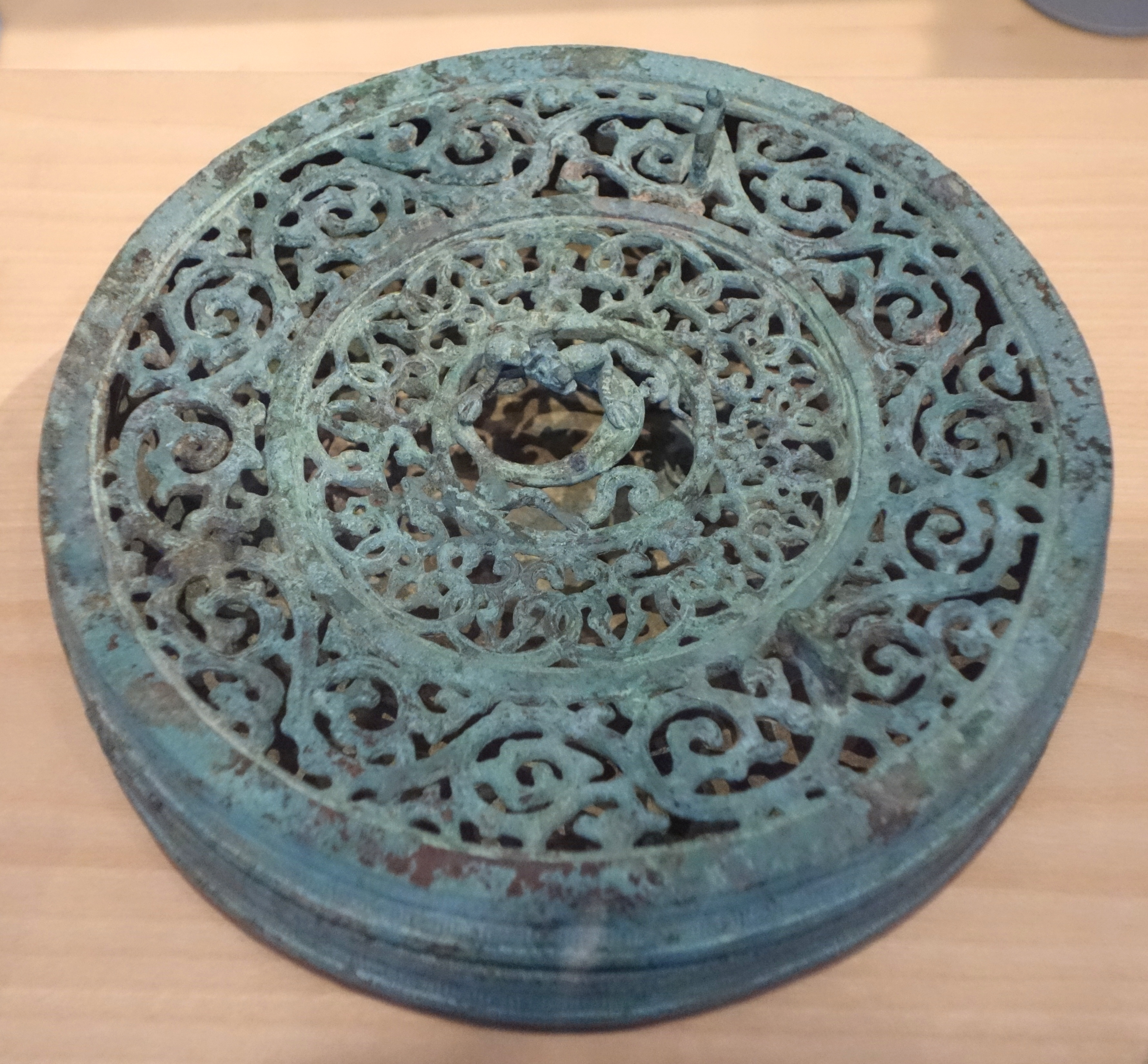
Fragrance box with openwork lid, Korea, Goryeo dynasty, 11th–12th century, bronze

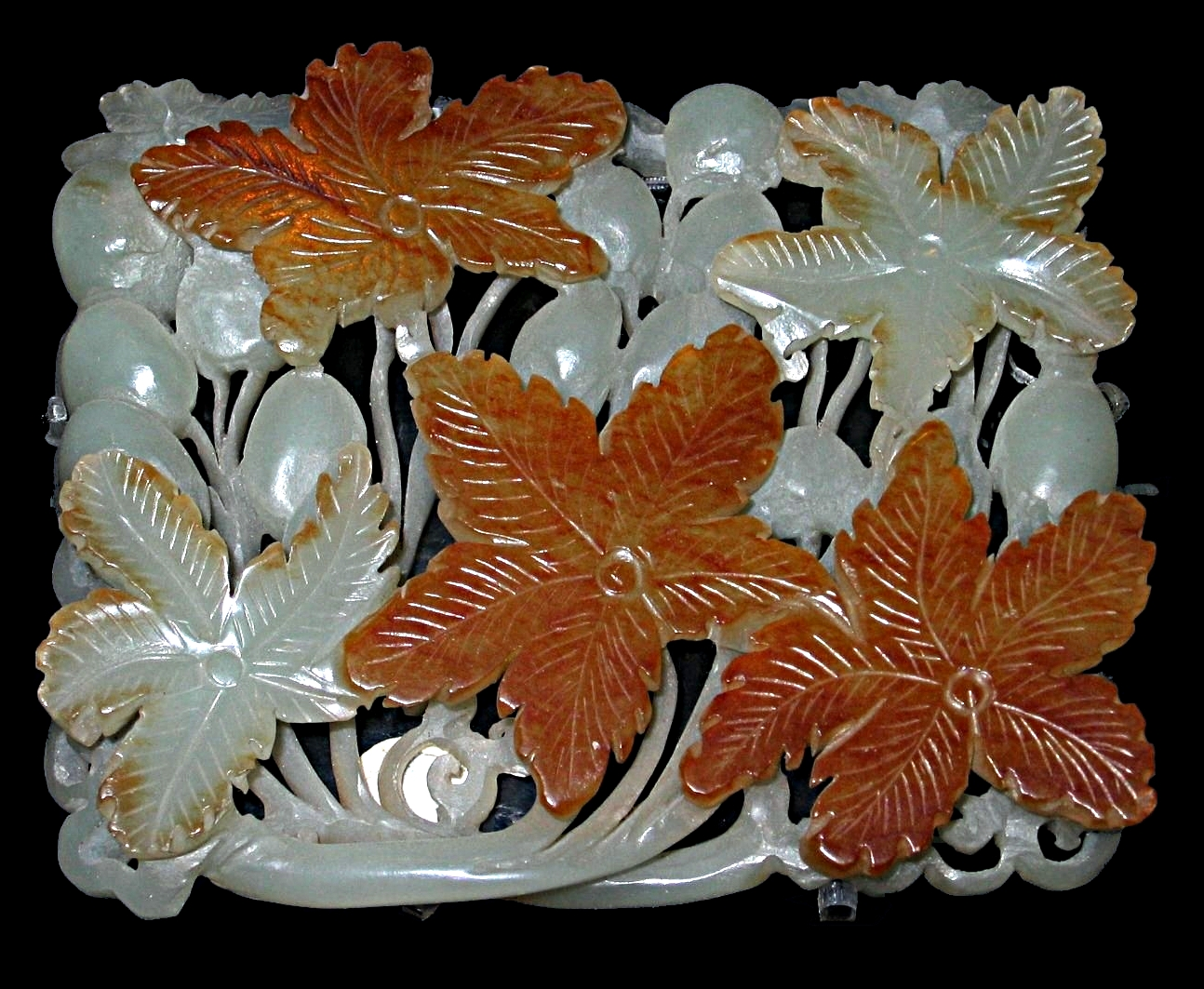
Chinese jade ornament with vines, Jin dynasty

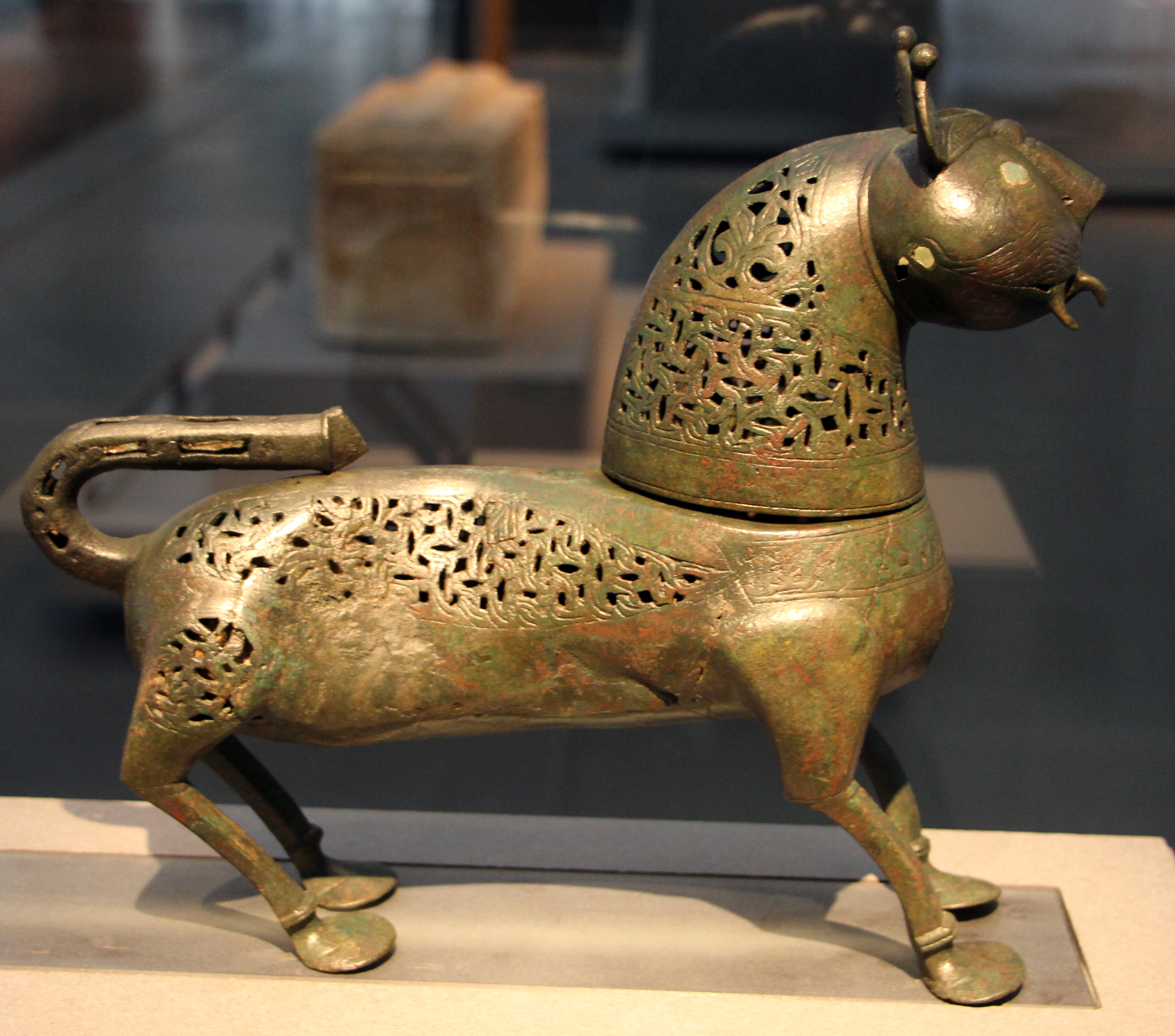
Persian incense burner, c. 11th century

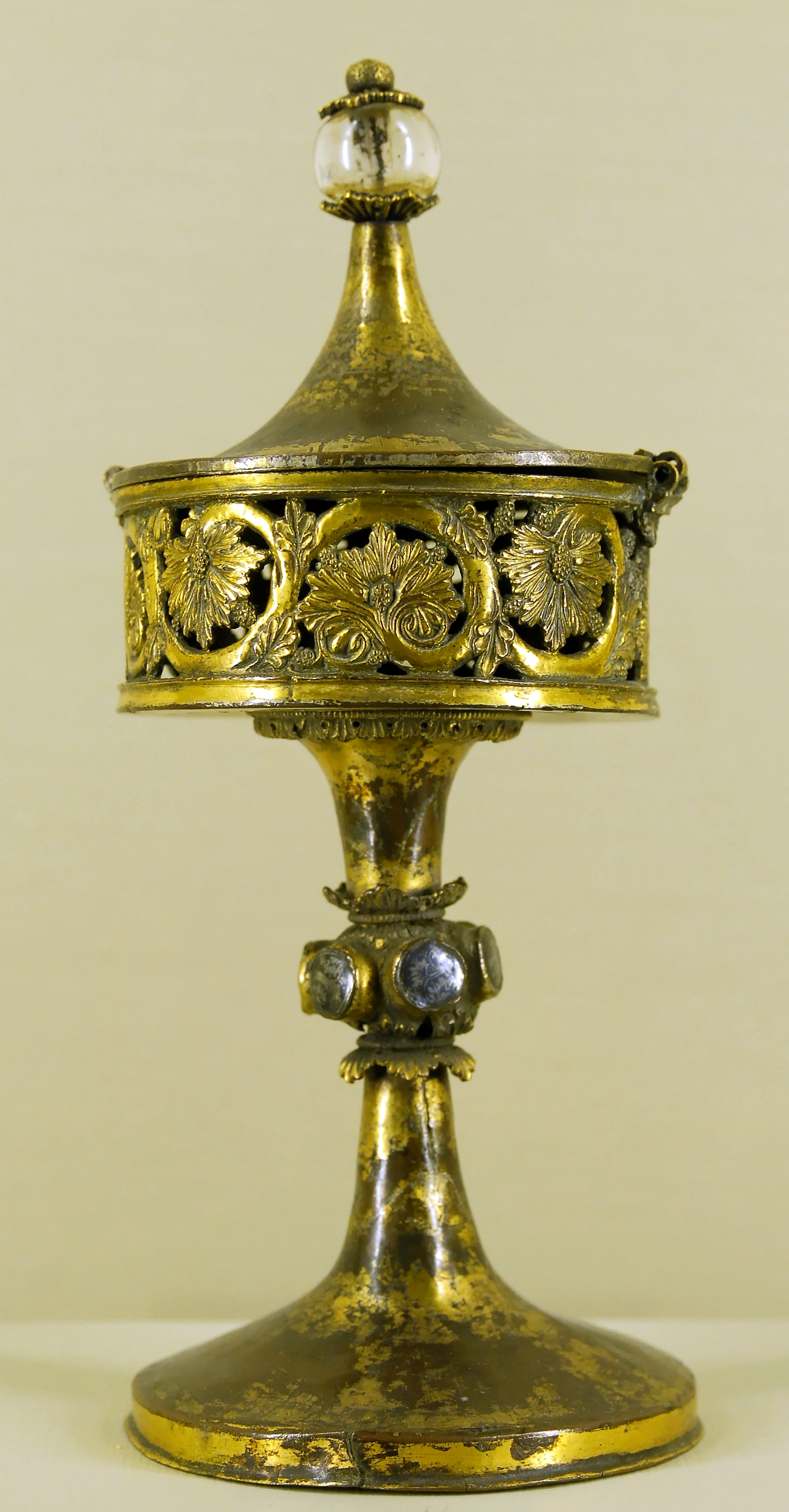
French pyx, 1220–1240

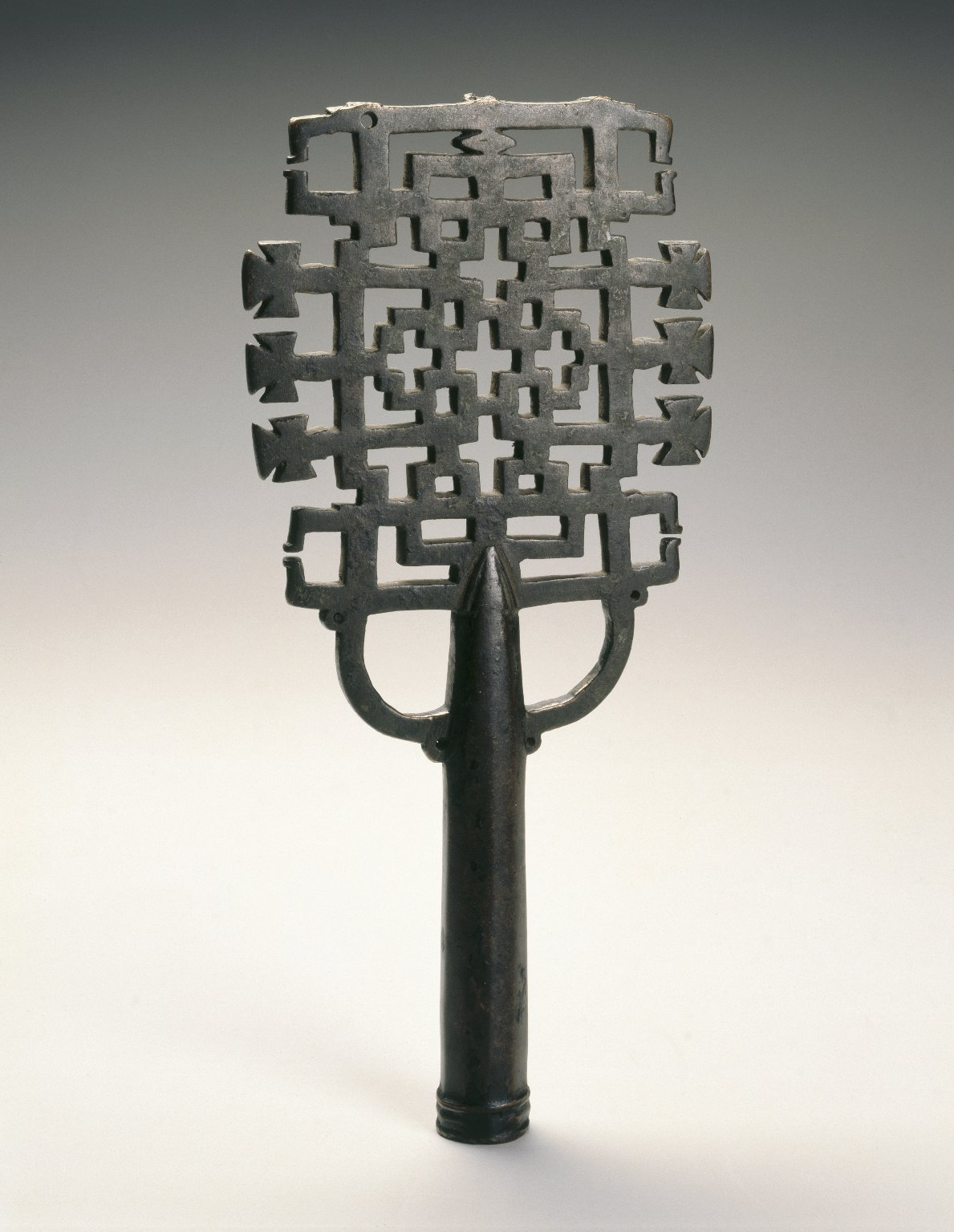
Head of an Ethiopian processional cross, 13th or 14th century

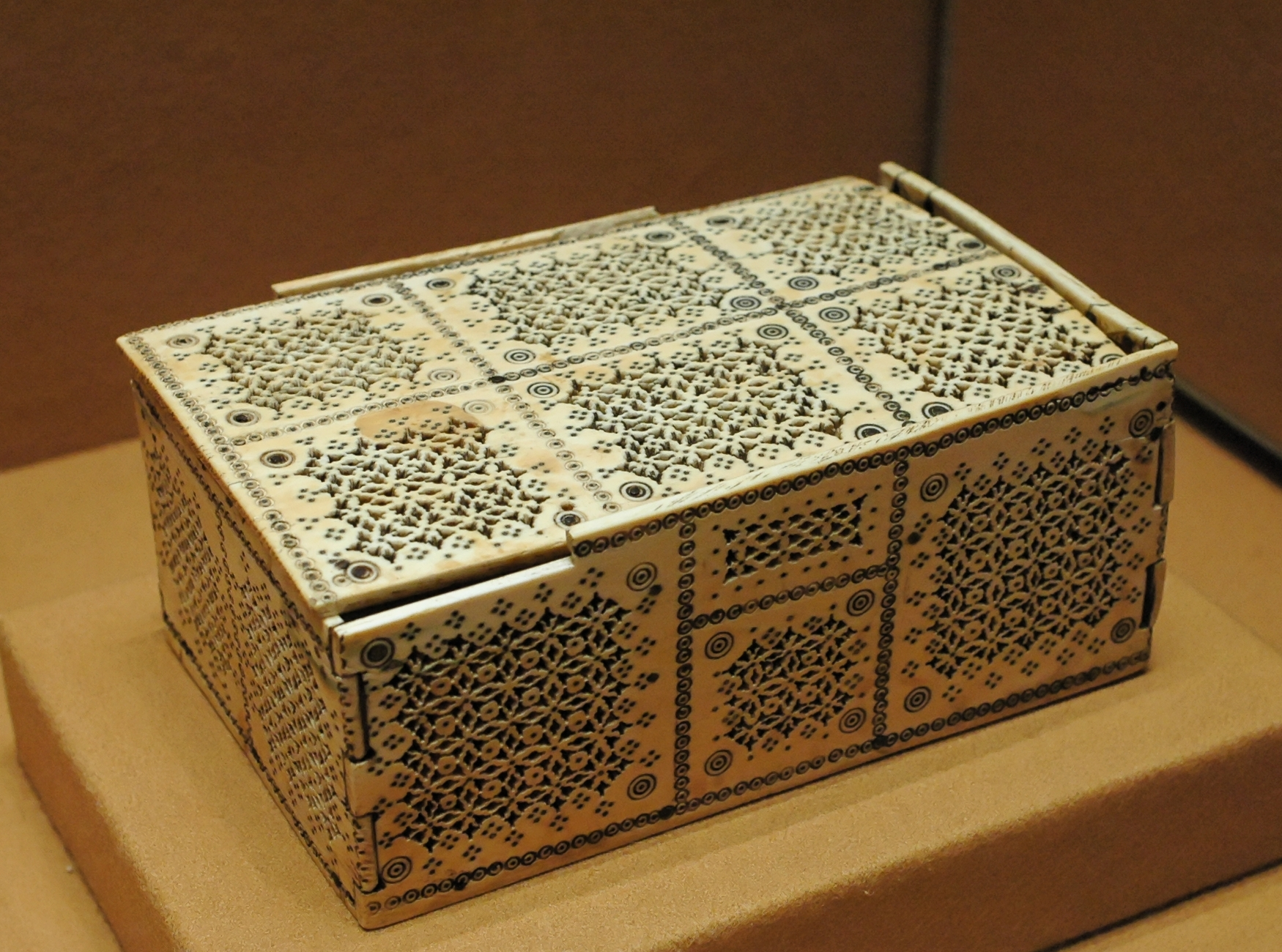
Ivory casket, Islamic Spain or Egypt, 13th or 14th century

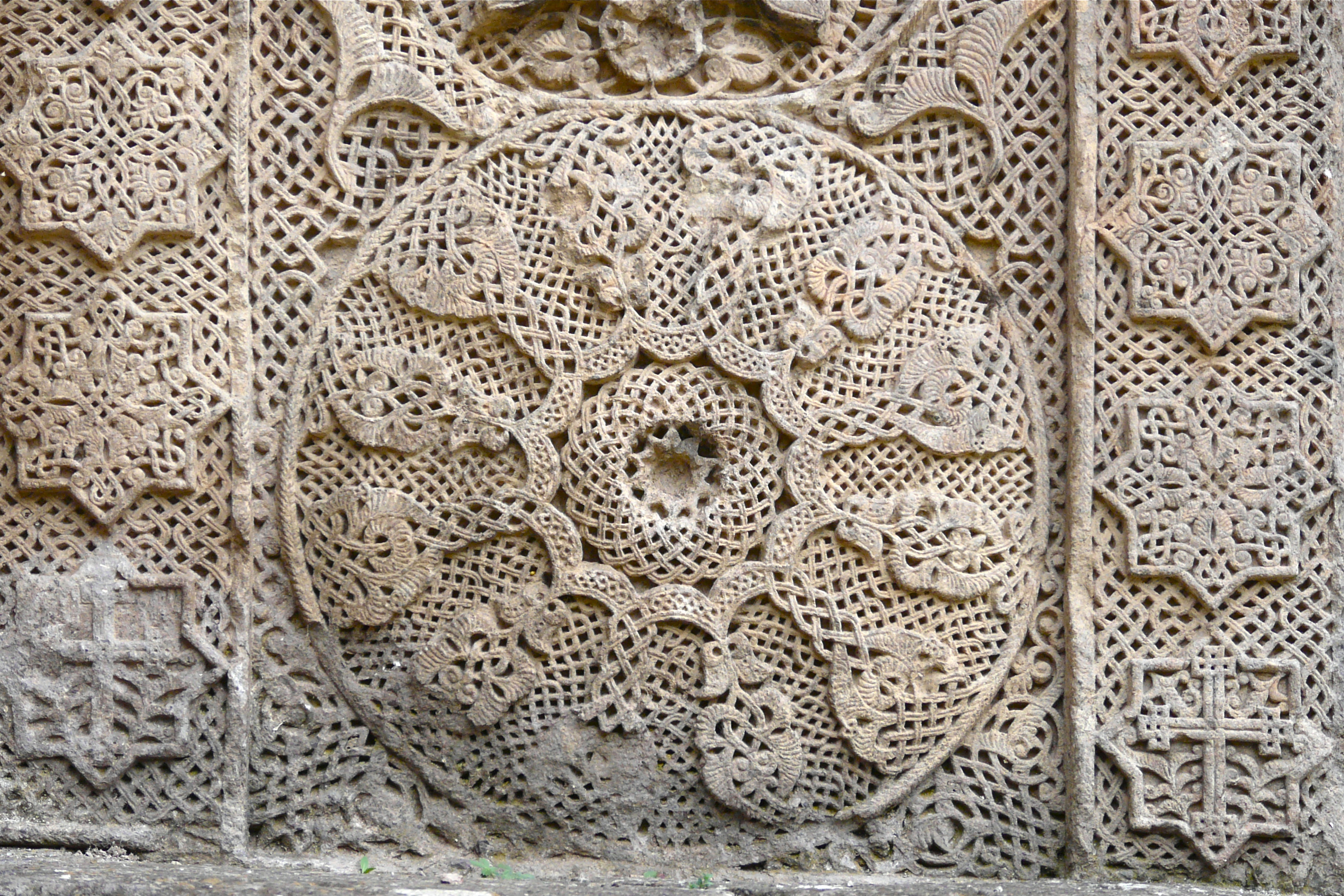
Detail of Armenian khachkar at Goshavank, 1291. The decoration does not cut right through the slab, so this is strictly relief giving the impression of openwork.

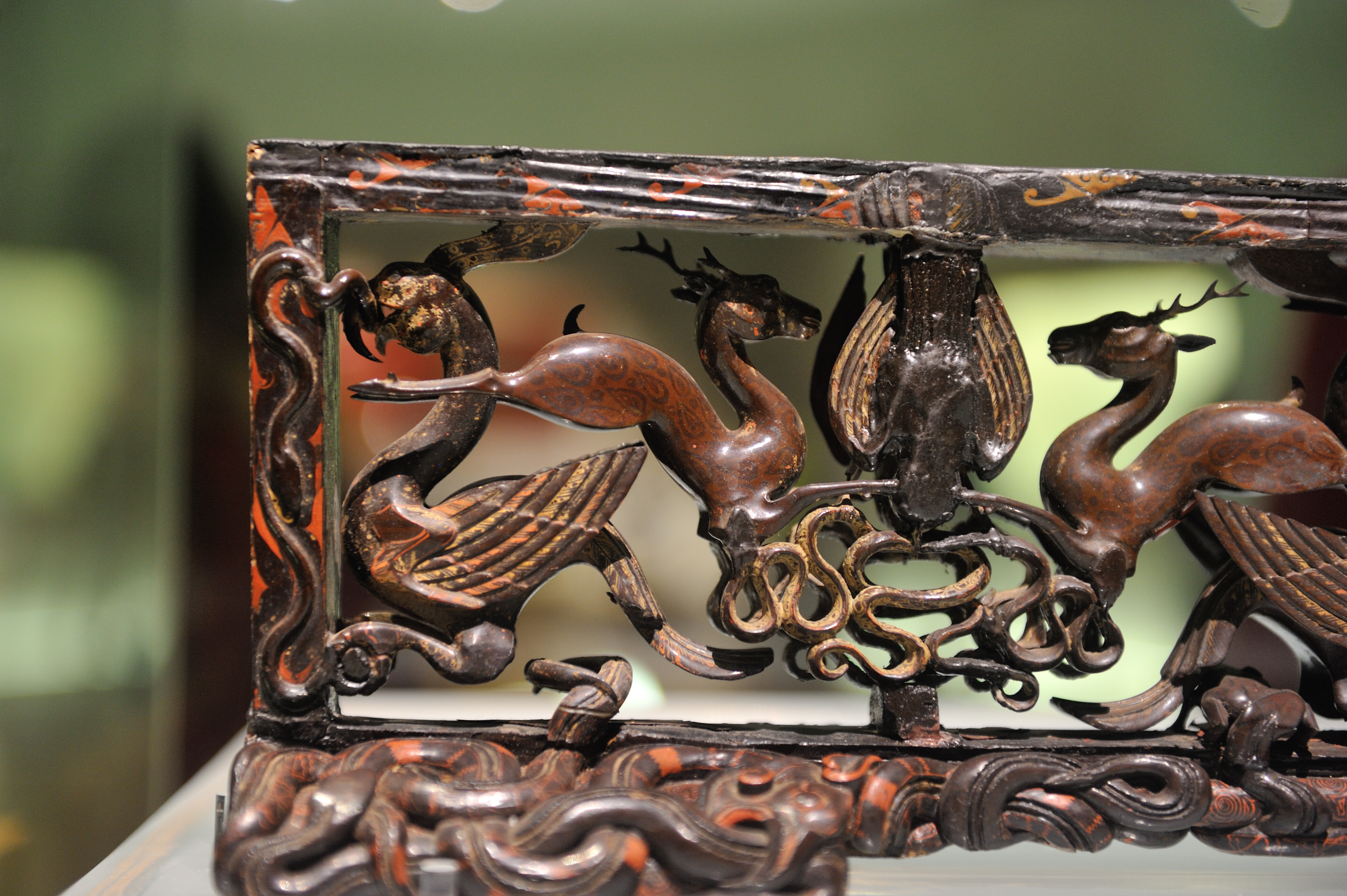
Chinese wood and lacquer screen

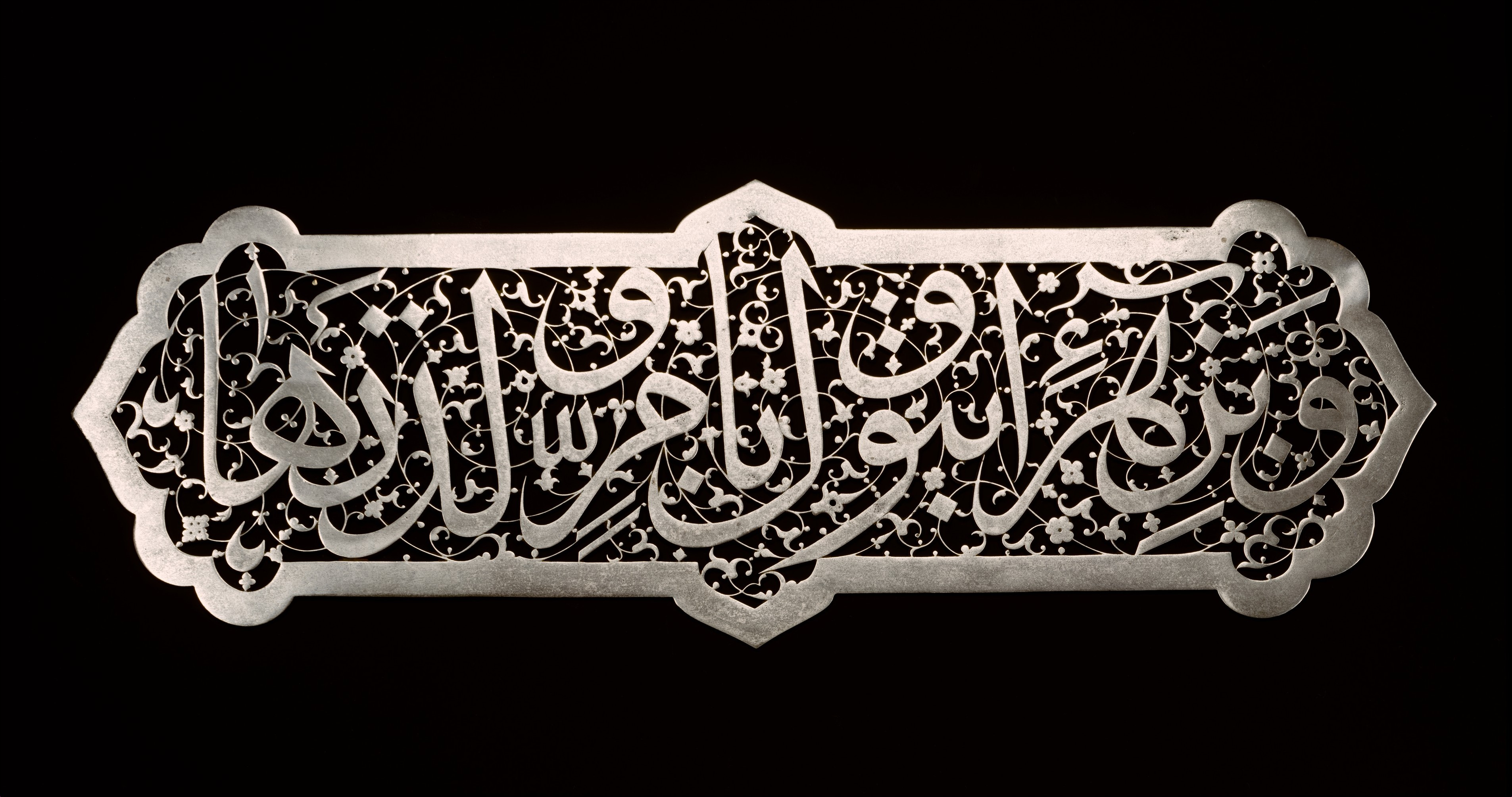
Steel plaque from Iran. One of a set of 8, probably for fixing to wood, perhaps in a royal tomb, 17th century

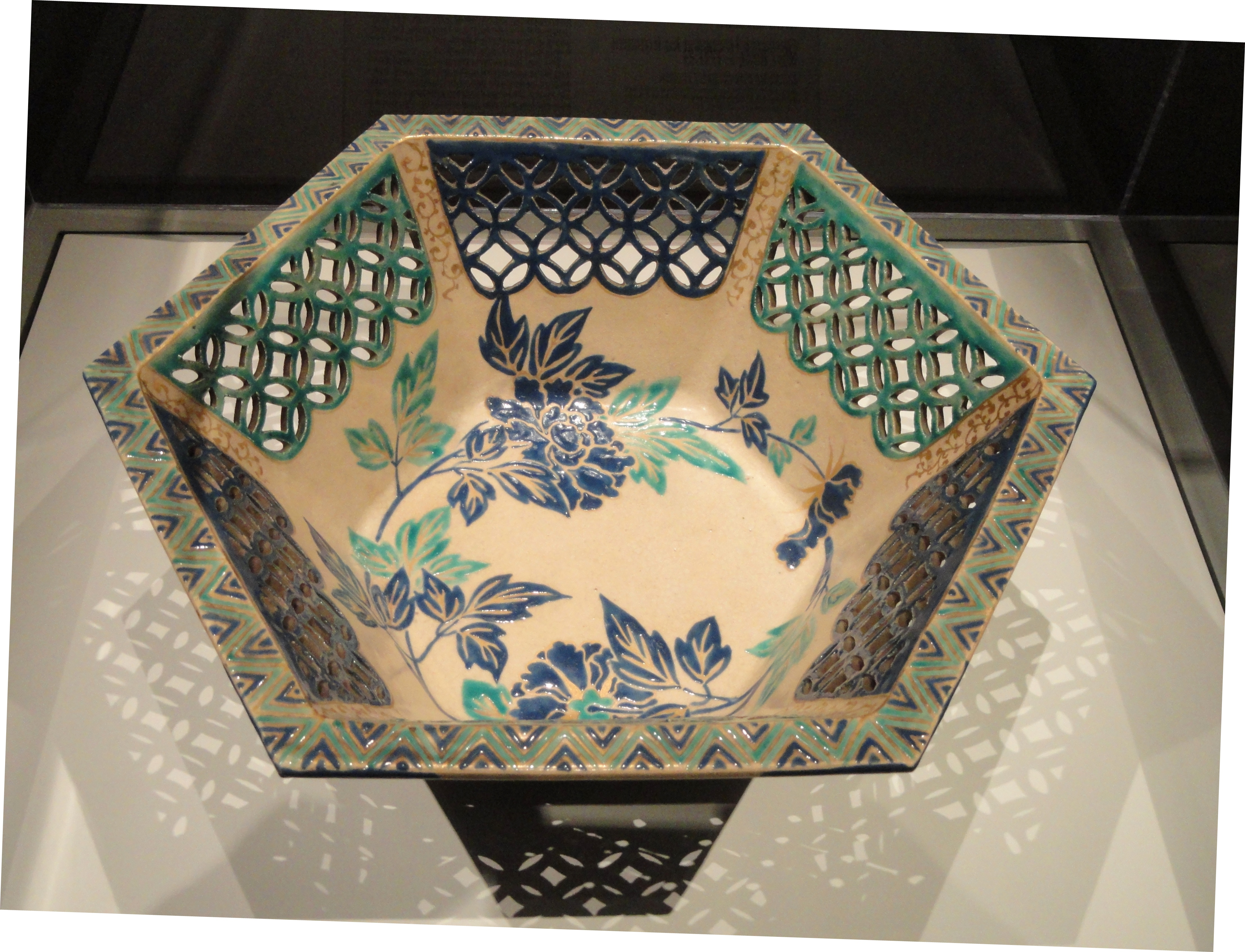
Openwork Hexagonal Ko-Kiyomizu Ware Bowl, c. 1731–1752, Japan, artist unknown, stoneware with overglaze enamels

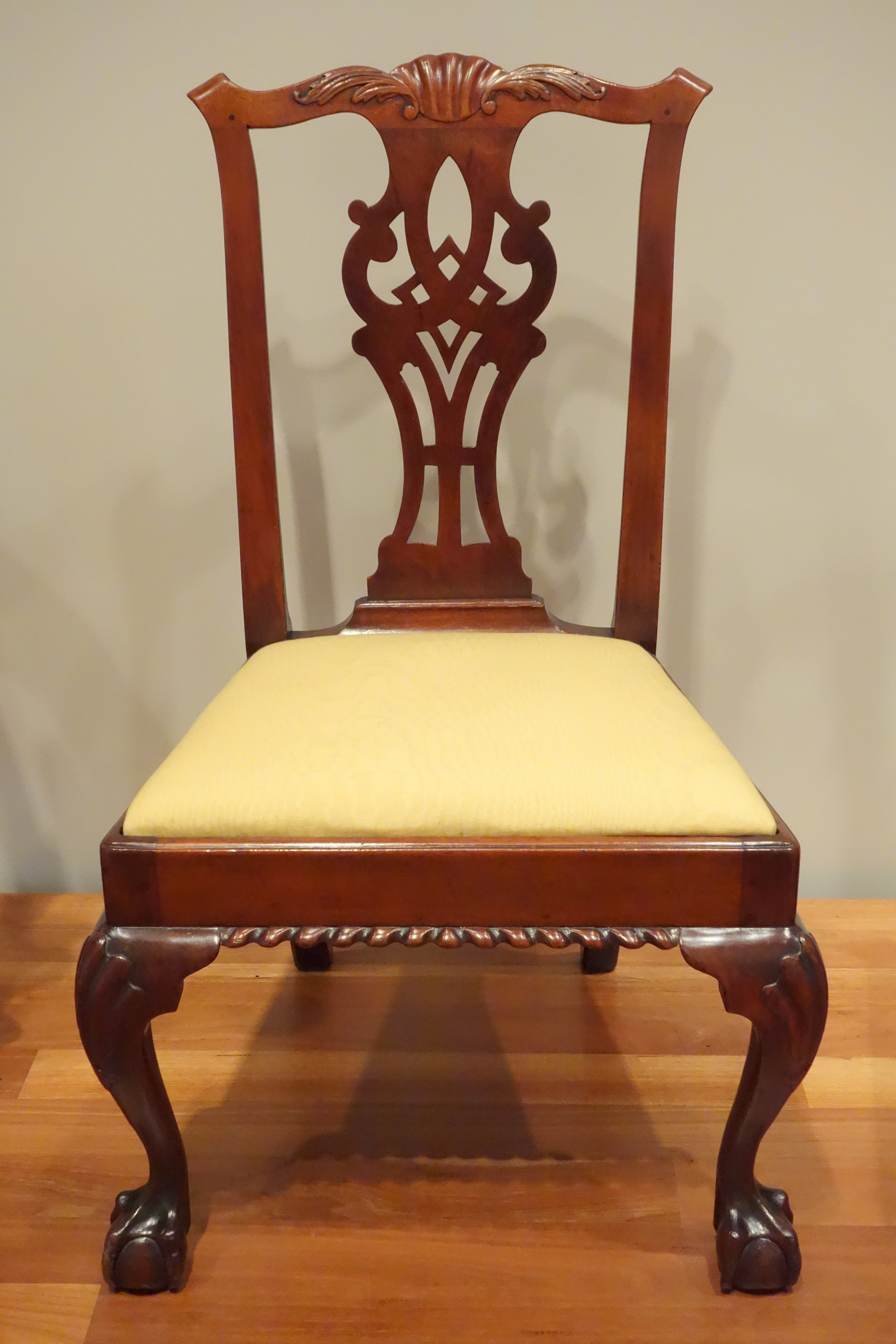
American chair, 1760–80, to a design by Thomas Chippendale

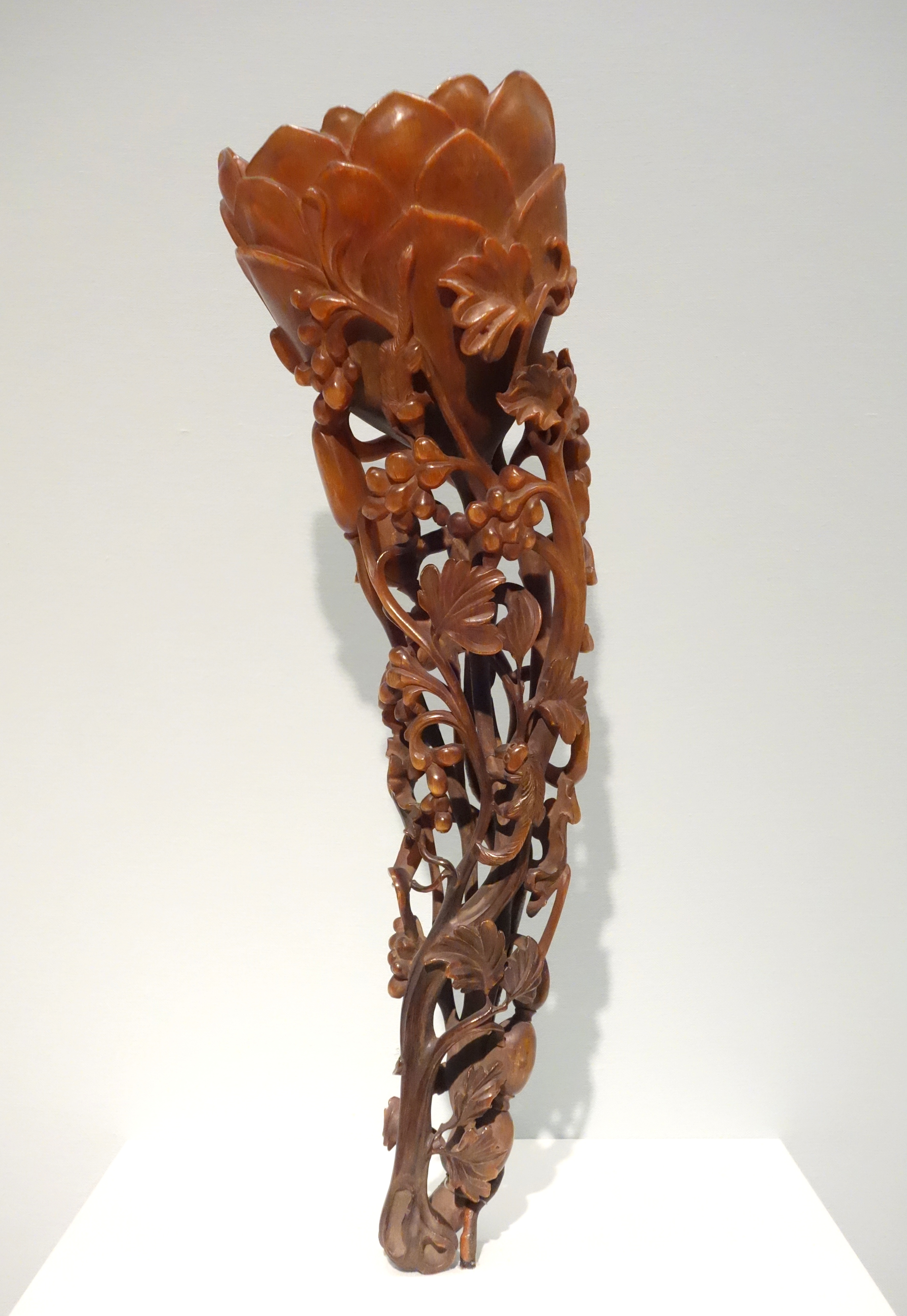
Lotus-shaped cup with openwork handle, China, probably 19th century AD, rhinoceros horn

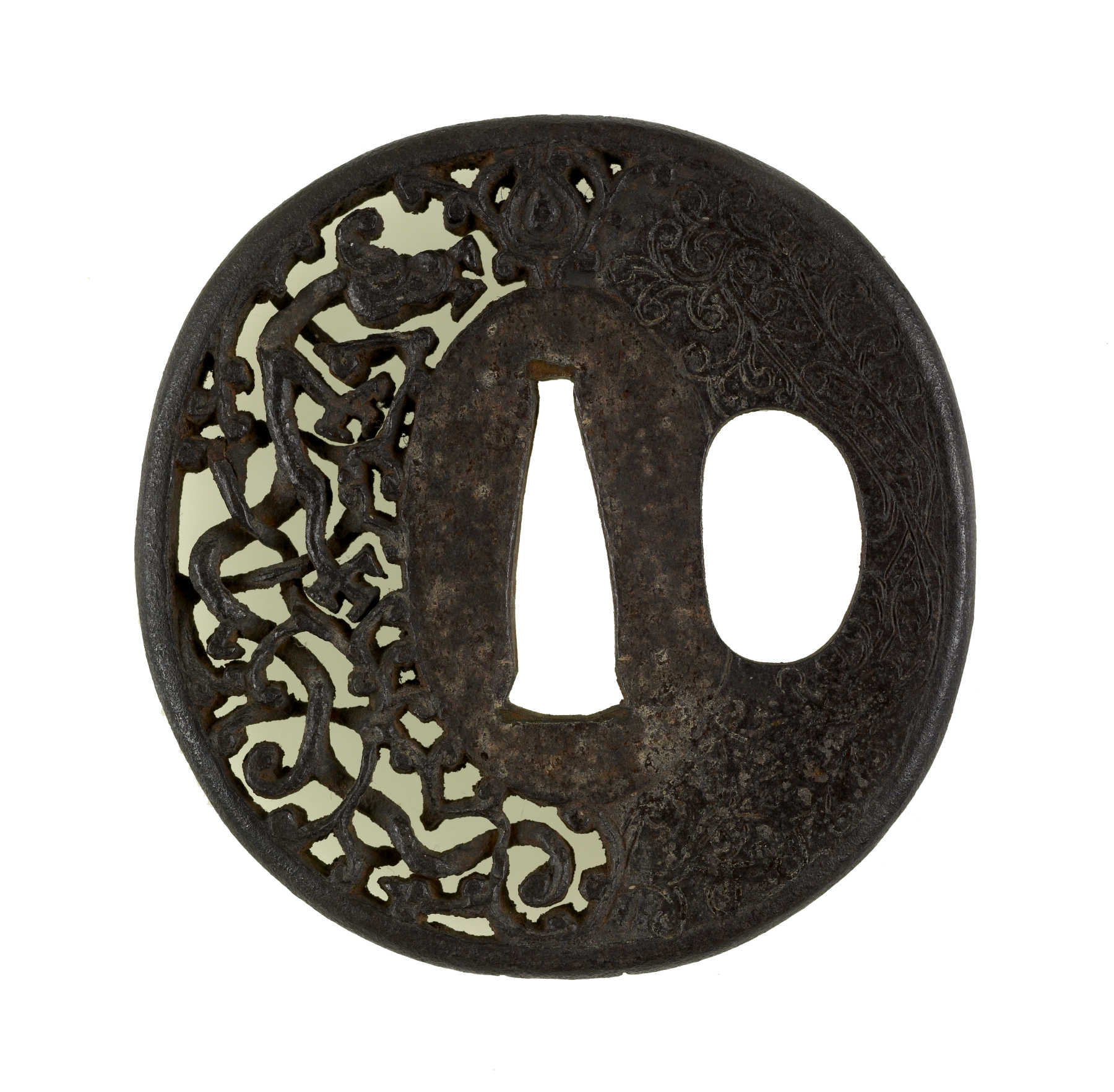
Japanese tsuba, early 19th century

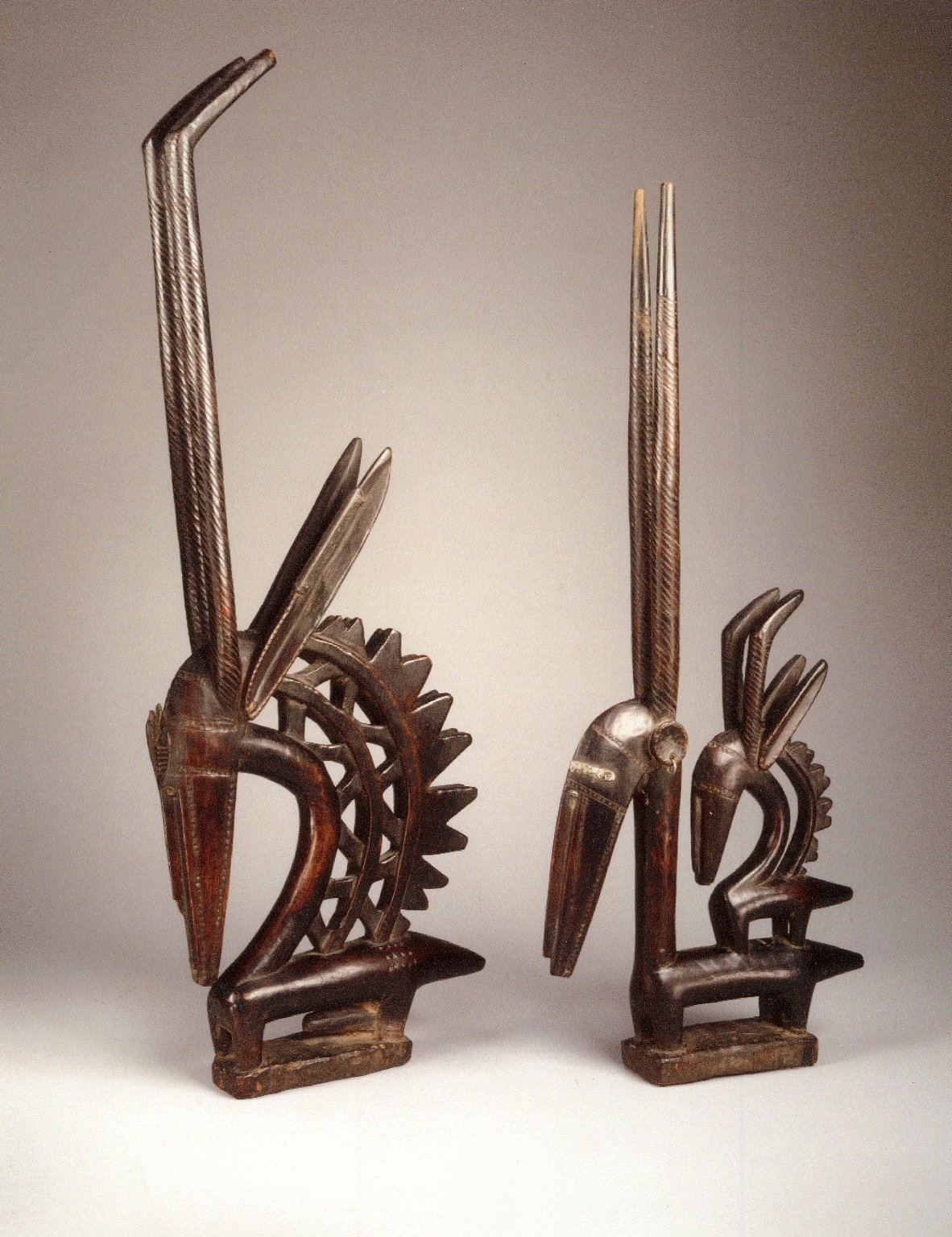
African dancer's headpiece, wood

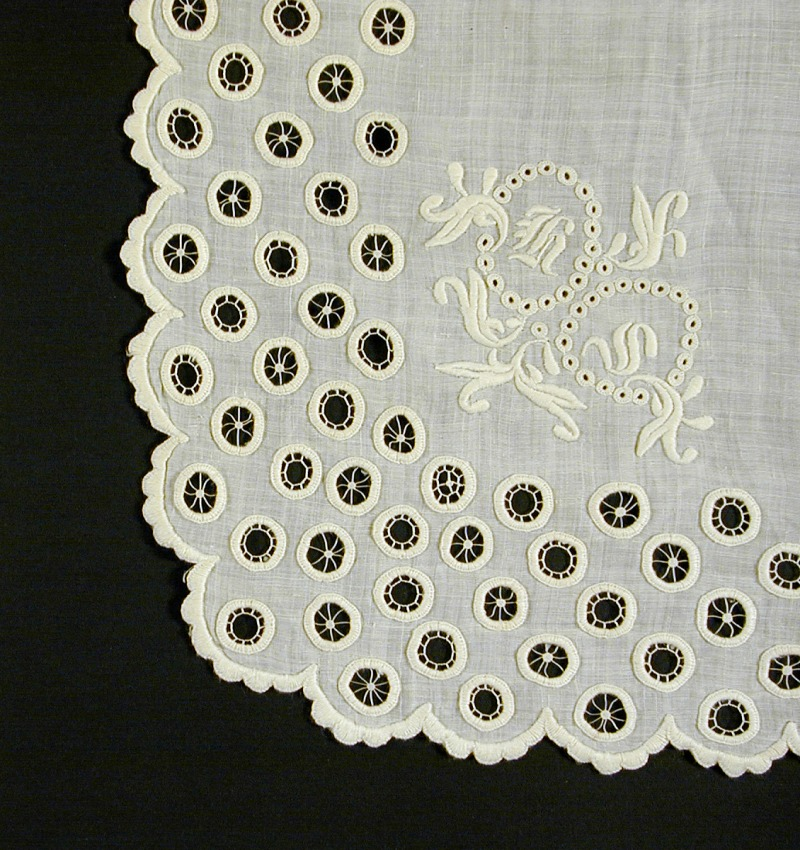
Detail of handkerchief in button-hole embroidery. Germany or Switzerland, 19th century.

=== Architecture gallery ===
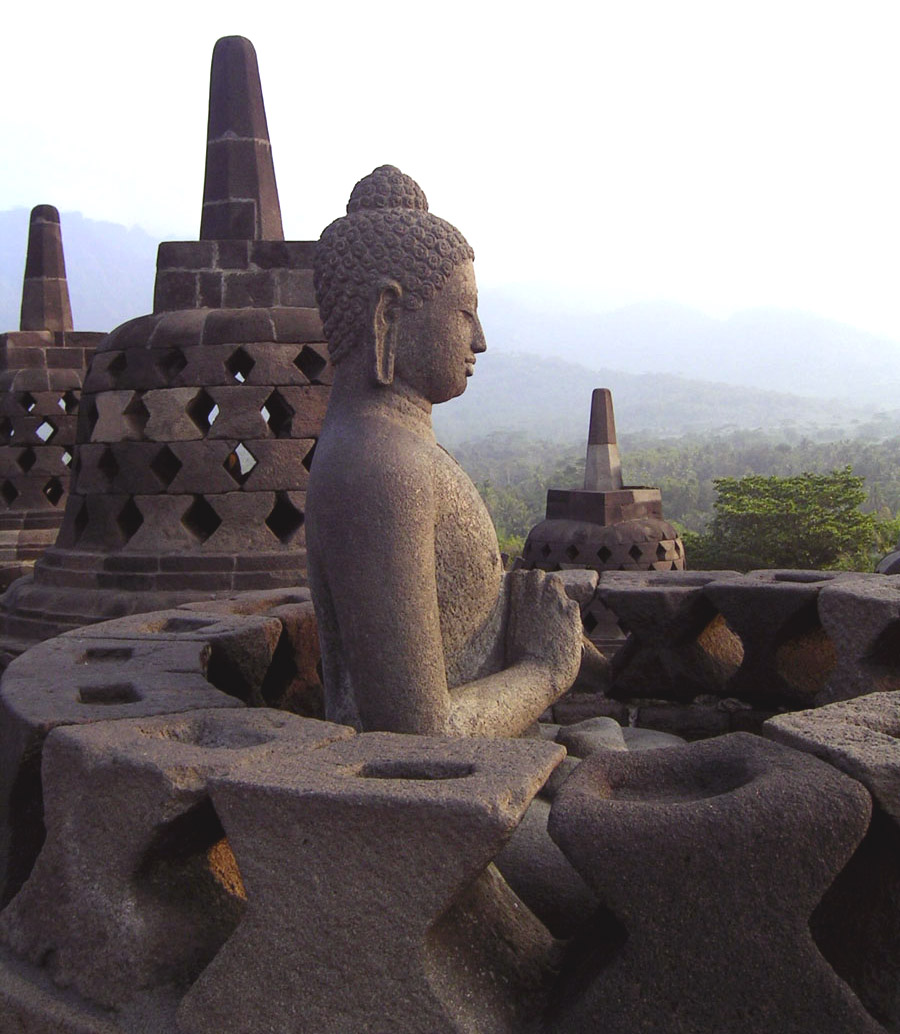
At Borobudor hundreds of Buddha statues sit inside openwork stupas; here the nearest is partly deconstructed

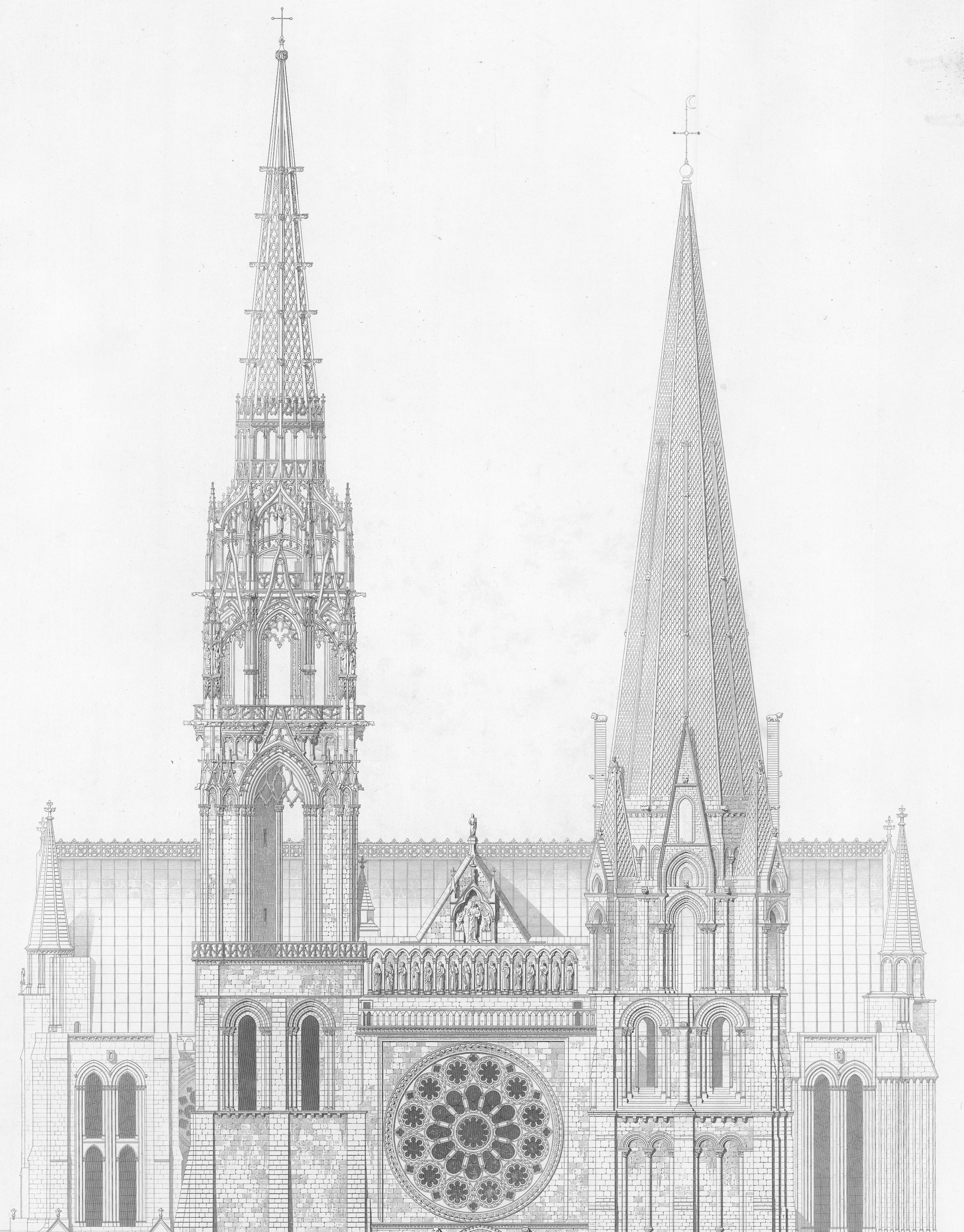
West front of Chartres Cathedral. The tower on the left is largely openwork

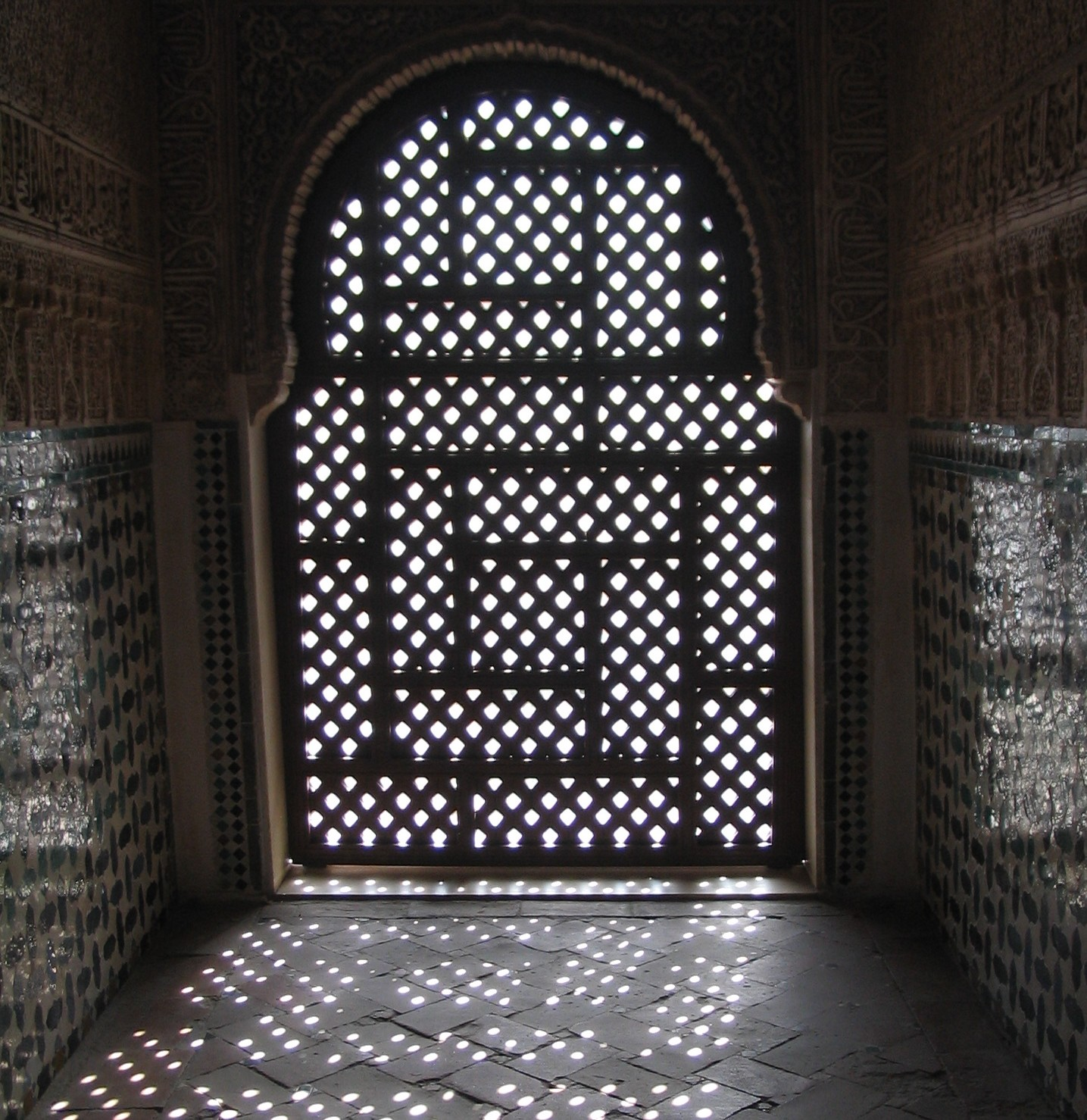
Window in the Alhambra

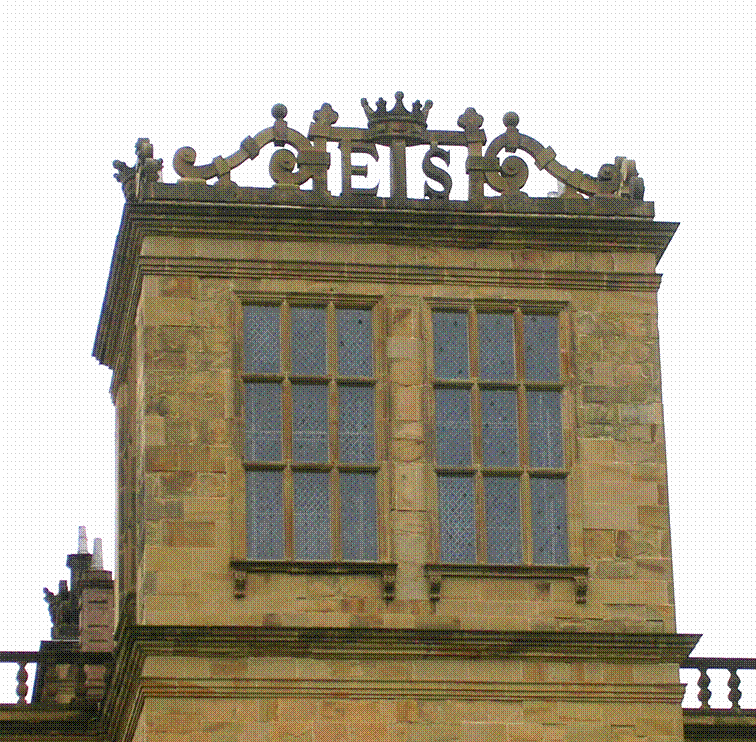
Hardwick Hall, England, 1590s

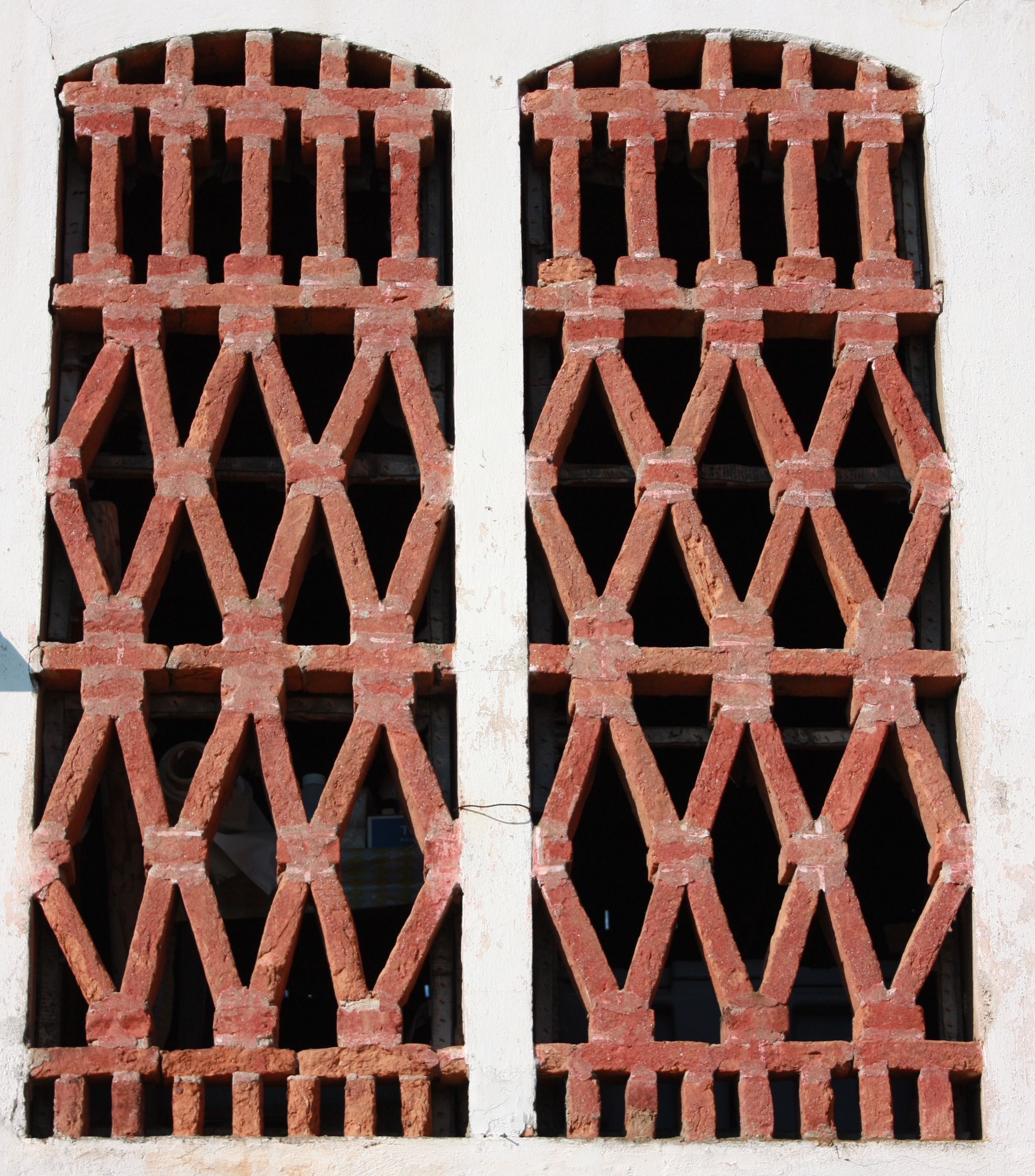
Brick windows on an Austrian barn

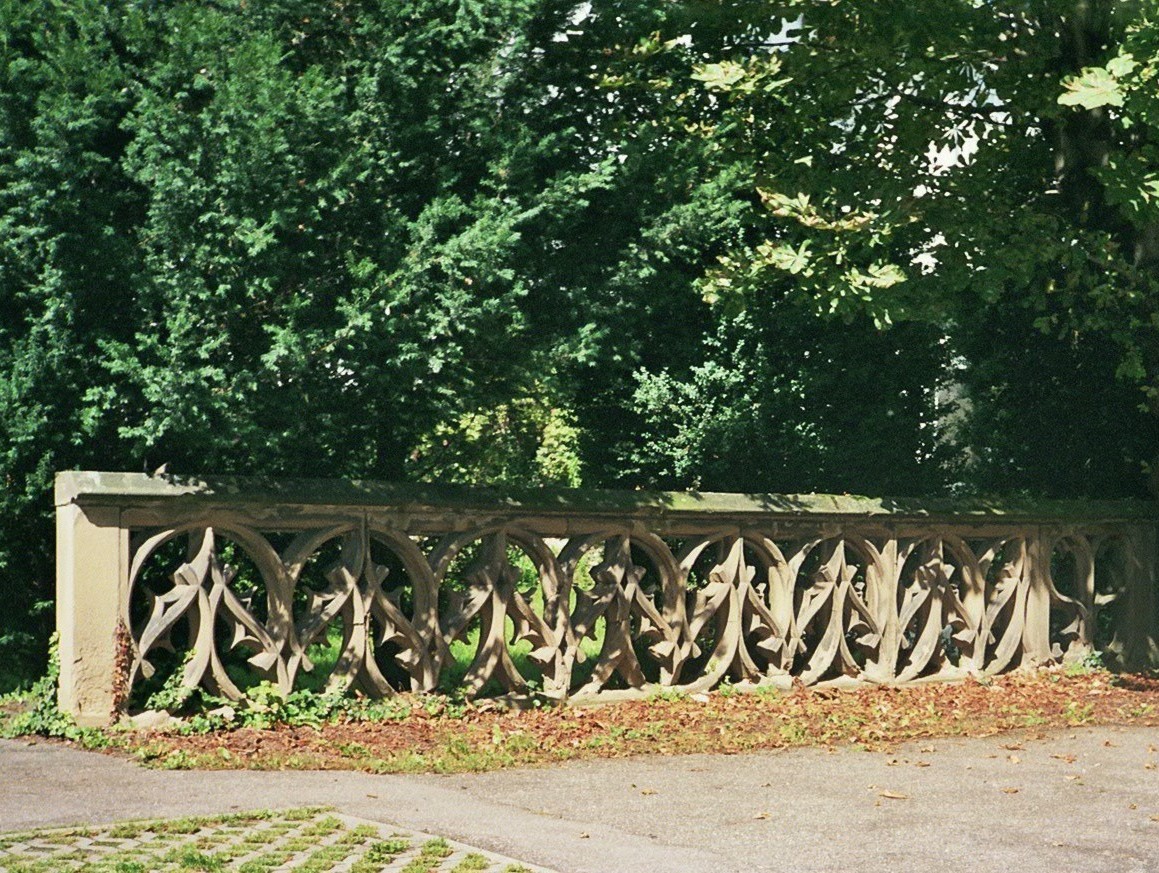
Gothic Revival balustrade in Germany

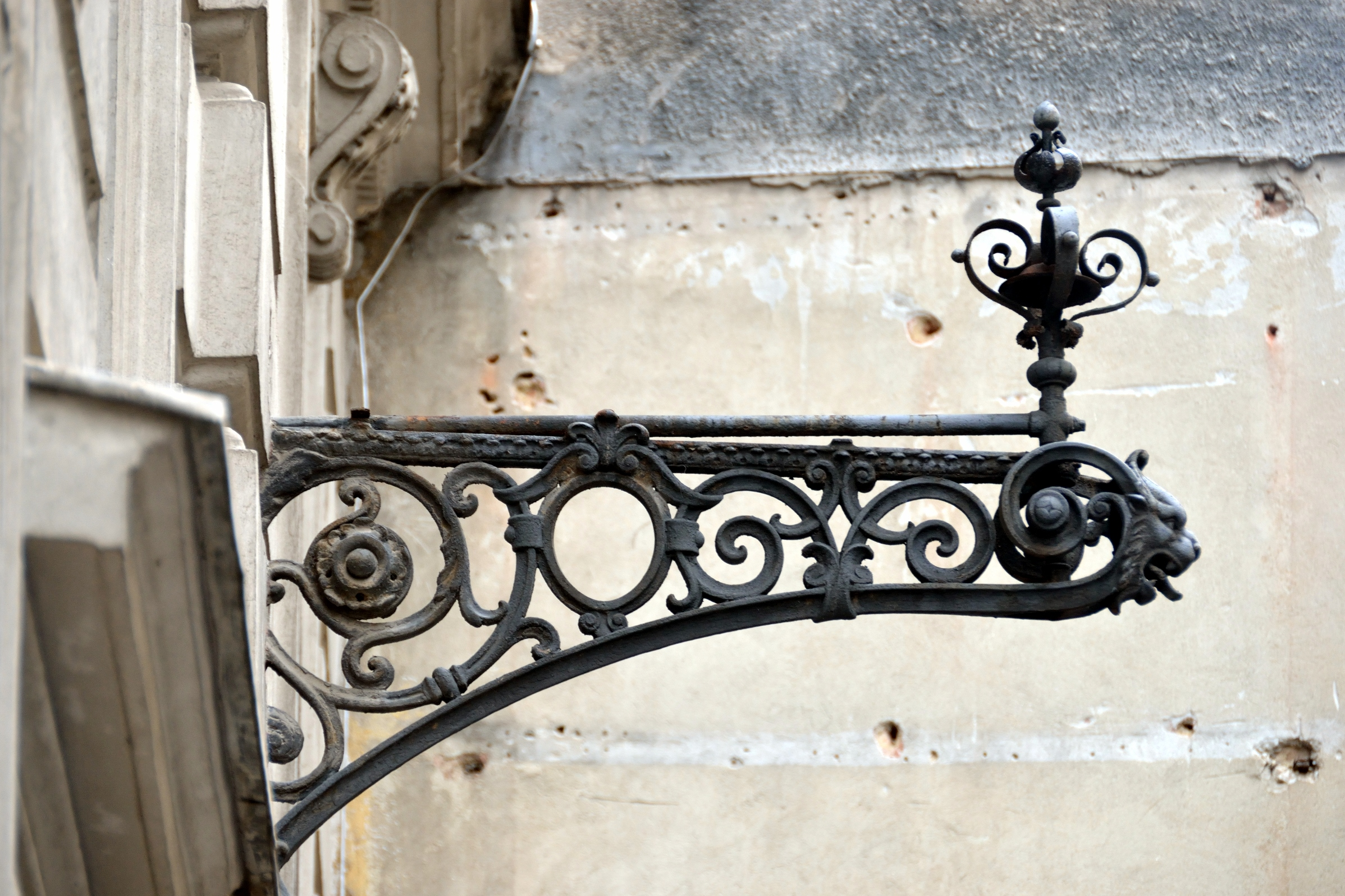
Cast iron bracket for a gas lamp, Vienna

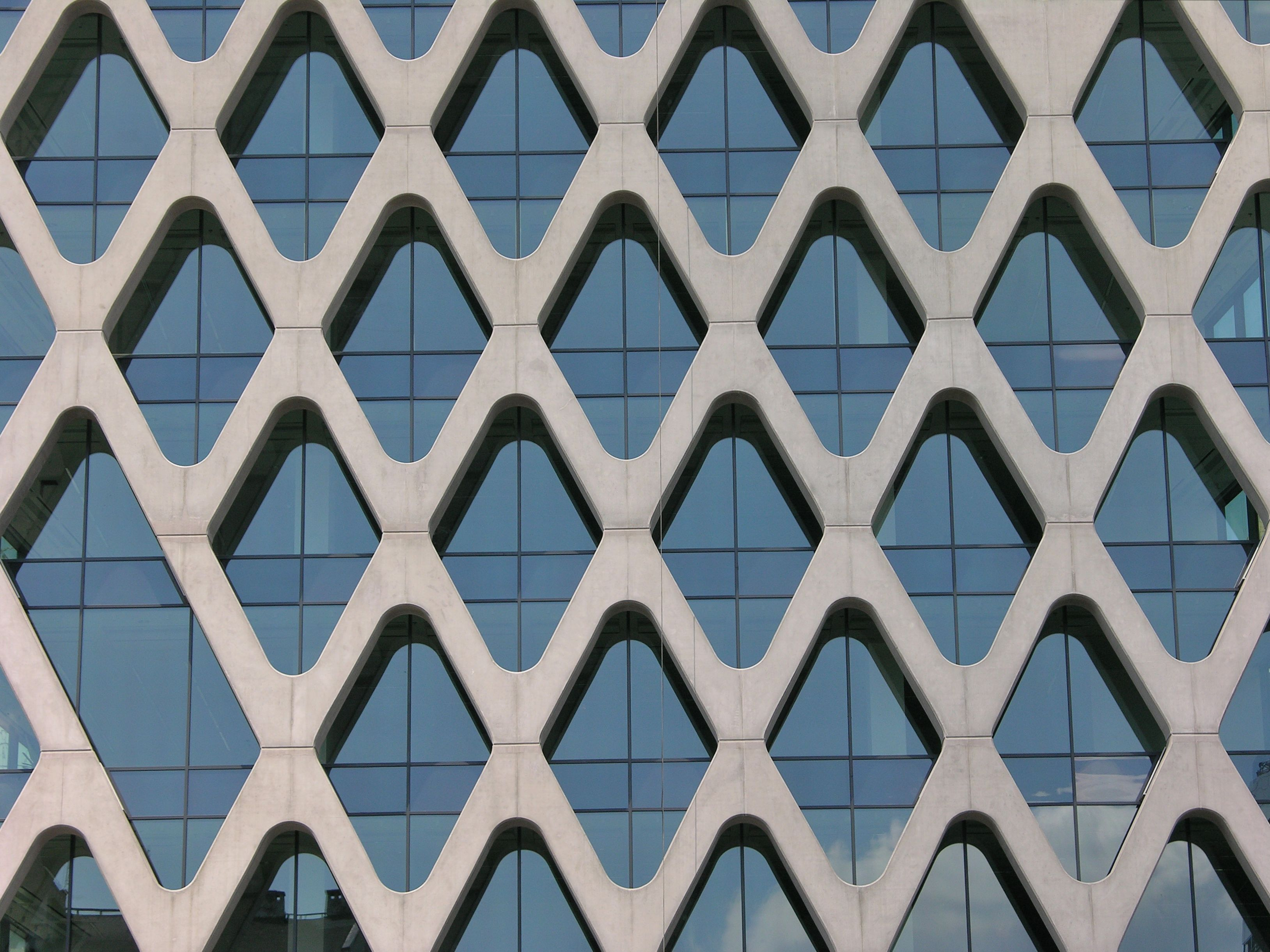
Opernwork fasade of Prosta Tower, Warsaw

== See also ==
- Open-work charm
