= Sukashibori =

Japanese term for openwork

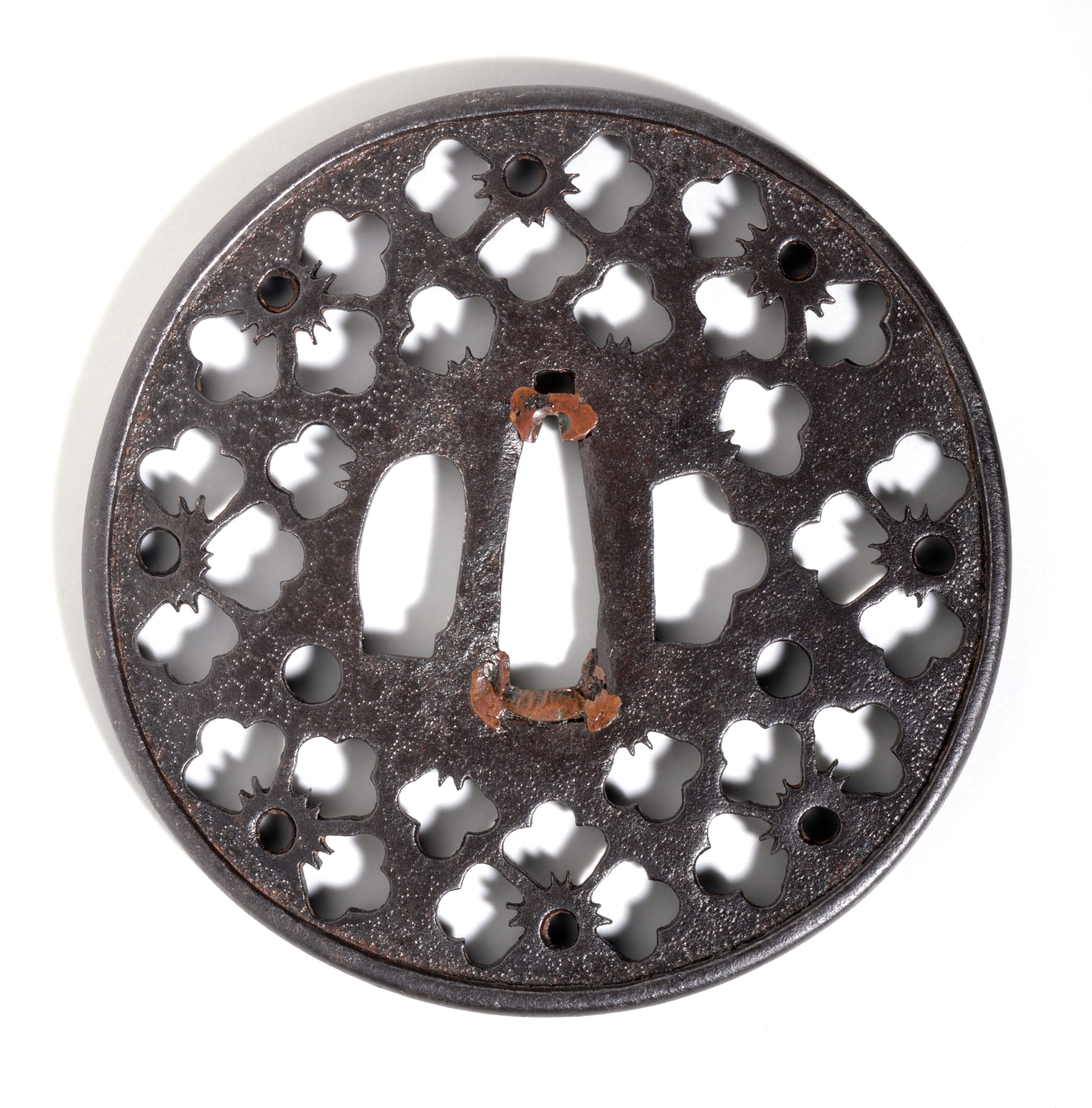
Openwork or sukashibori tsuba or sword guard

Sukashibori (透彫(すかしぼり)) is the Japanese term for openwork or pierced work, using various techniques in metalworking and other media, in which the foreground design is left intact, while background areas are cut away and removed (or the converse may be performed). The resulting piece becomes see-through (sukashi) and hence the name.

Traditional artisans worked on piece of cast metal (or hammered metal) such as bronze as medium. In traditional metalworking (chōkin, 彫金), the carving tools they used were the piercing burin (sukashi-tagane, 透かし鏨) and scroll saw (tsurubiki-noko(?), 弦引鋸).

The type where the foreground pattern is preserved and the background removed is called ji-sukashi (地透し), and the reverse is called moyō-sukashi (文様透し).

In Buddhist art, foliage scrollwork (唐草模様, karakusa-moyō) or lotus motif is often used The result is an Arabesque-like or lacework-like design. They are featured in the depiction of the kōhai or "rear glow" (the halo or nimbus behind Buddhist statues) as well as the tiara-like headpieces crowning their heads. Other prominent uses are in ritual objects such as keman (pendent ornaments), keko (華籠, "flower basket"), and kōro (香炉, incense burners). Examples of tsuba (hilt-guard) of the Japanese sword often use sukashibori work.

The word is also applied when used for other material, such as wood; for example, the transom (ranma) may be done in sukashibori work.

== See also ==
- Opus interrasile
- Openwork
- Fretwork
