= Opus interrasile =

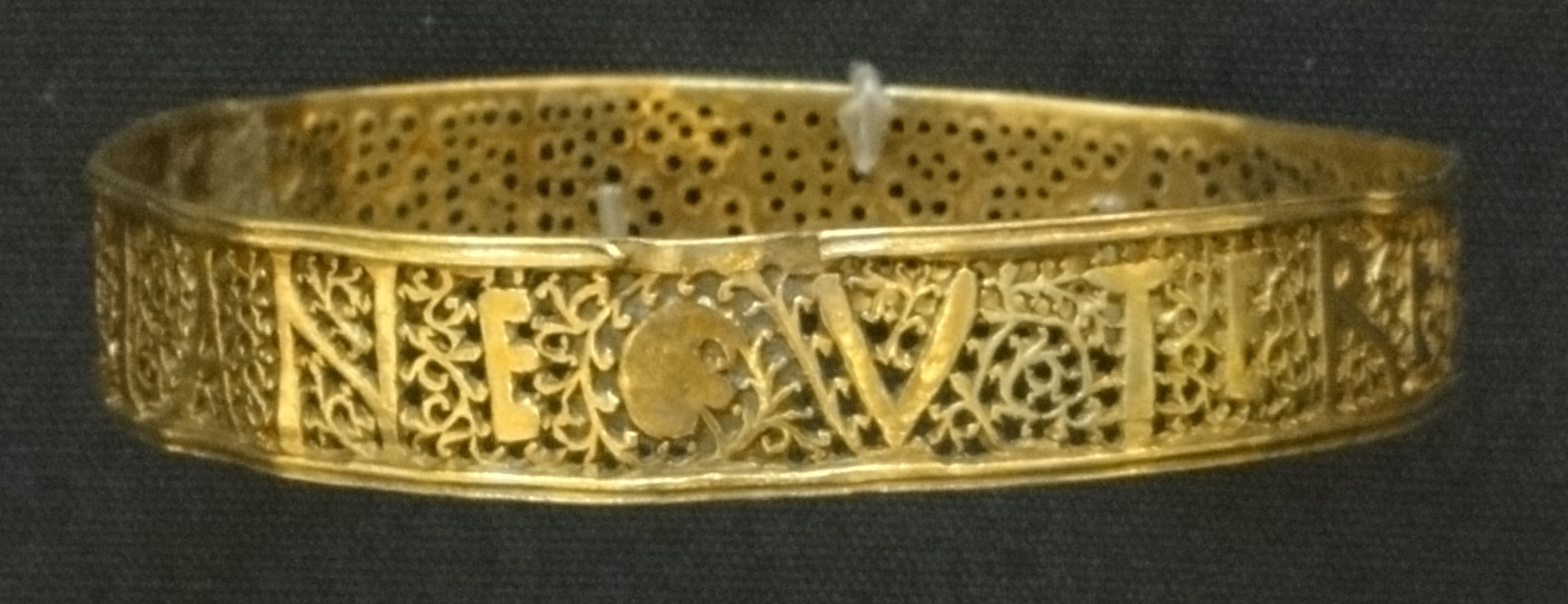
Ancient Roman gold bracelet from the Hoxne Hoard, found in Britain and buried after 407 AD. The name JULIANE is spelled out.

Opus interrasile, lit. 'work shaved or scraped in-between' is a pierced openwork metalworking technique found from the 3rd century AD, and remaining popular in Byzantine jewellery. It was developed and popularized in Rome, where metalworkers used it to make arabesques and other similar designs. The technique involves punching holes in metal to simulate lattice patterns, openwork gold jewelry, and so on. Patterns were often drawn on the metal, and then various tools used to remove the desired pieces.

The technique may be referred more generically to as openwork or pierced work. The equivalent technique in Japan is called sukashibori, and is found in Buddhist art.
