= Piers (name) =

Piers is an old English given name and surname, and has the same origins as Peter. Its meaning is 'rock, stone'.

== People with the given name ==
- Piers Adam (born 1964), British businessman
- Piers Adams (born 1963), British recorder player
- Piers Akerman (born 1950), Australian journalist, conservative commentator and columnist
- Piers Anthony (born 1934), Anglo-American fantasy/science fiction author known for his Xanth series of novels
- Piers Baker (born 1962), British cartoonist
- Piers Baron (born 1983), English musician
- Piers Bengough (1929–2005), British Army officer
- Piers Benn (born 1962), British philosopher
- Piers Bishop (born 1956), British artist
- Piers Bizony (born 1959), Science journalist
- Piers Blaikie (born 1942), British geographer
- Piers Bohl (1865–1921), Latvian mathematician
- Piers Brendon (born 1940), British writer
- Piers Butler, 8th Earl of Ormond (c. 1467 – 1539)
- Piers Claughton (1814–1884), British Anglican bishop, Archdeacon of London and Chaplain-General of Her Majesty's Forces
- Piers Coleman, British physicist
- Piers Corbyn (born 1947), British weather forecaster, climate change denier and conspiracy theorist
- Piers Courage (1942–1970), English racing driver
- Piers Crosby (1590–1646), Irish soldier
- Piers Dixon (1928–2017), British Conservative politician
- Piers Dutton (died 1545), British politician
- Pier Gerlofs Donia (c. 1480 – 1520), Frisian rebel leader and pirate
- Piers Maxwell Dudley-Bateman (1947–2015), Australian landscape painter
- Piers Edgecumbe (c. 1609 – 1667), English politician
- Piers Edgcumbe, 5th Earl of Mount Edgcumbe (1865–1944), British soldier
- Piers Faccini (born 1970), English singer and painter
- Piers Flint-Shipman (1962–1984), English actor
- Piers Gaveston, 1st Earl of Cornwall (c. 1284 – 1312), a favourite of King Edward II of England
- Piers Gilliver (born 1994), British wheelchair fencer
- Piers Gough (born 1946), British architect
- Piers Haggard (1939–2023), British television and film director
- Piers Lane (born 1958), Australian concert pianist
- Piers Mackesy (1924–2014), British military historian
- Piers McDonald (born 1955), Canadian politician and trade unionist
- Piers Merchant (1951–2009), British politician
- Piers Morgan (born 1965), British broadcaster and former tabloid newspaper editor
- Piers Nash (born 1969), British/Canadian/American scientist.
- Piers Paul Read (born 1941), English novelist, historian and biographer
- Piers Sellers (1955–2016), Anglo-American meteorologist and NASA astronaut
- Piers Torday (born 1974), British children's writer
- Piers Wenger (born 1972), British television producer

== Surname ==
- Piers baronets, two baronetcies created for persons with the surname Piers
- Constance Piers (1866–1939), Canadian journalist, poet, editor
- Dennis Piers (1929–2005), South African cricketer
- Desmond Piers (1913–2005), Royal Canadian Navy rear-admiral
- Harry Piers (1870–1940), Canadian historian
- Henry Piers (1568–1623), Anglo-Irish Member of Parliament, administrator and writer
- Sir Henry Piers, 1st Baronet (1629–1691), Anglo-Irish soldier and antiquarian
- John Piers (1522/3–1594), Archbishop of York
- Sir John Piers, 6th Baronet (1772–1845), Irish rake and duellist
- Julie Piers (born 1962), American golfer
- Sarah Piers (died 1719), English literary patron, political commentator and poet
- William Piers (bishop) (c. 1580 – 1670), British Anglican bishop and Vice-Chancellor of Oxford University
- William Piers (constable) (c. 1510 – 1603), constable of Carrickfergus

Fictional characters include:

- The title character of Piers Plowman, a Middle English allegorical narrative poem by William Langland
- Piers is a main character of Game Boy Advance JRPG Golden Sun: The Lost Age
- Piers, one of the Gym Leaders in Pokémon Sword and Shield
- Piers Nivans is the name of a BSAA soldier from the video game Resident Evil 6

== See also ==
- Pier (given name)
- Pierse, a surname and given name
