= Corp Naomh =

9th or 10th century Irish bell shrine

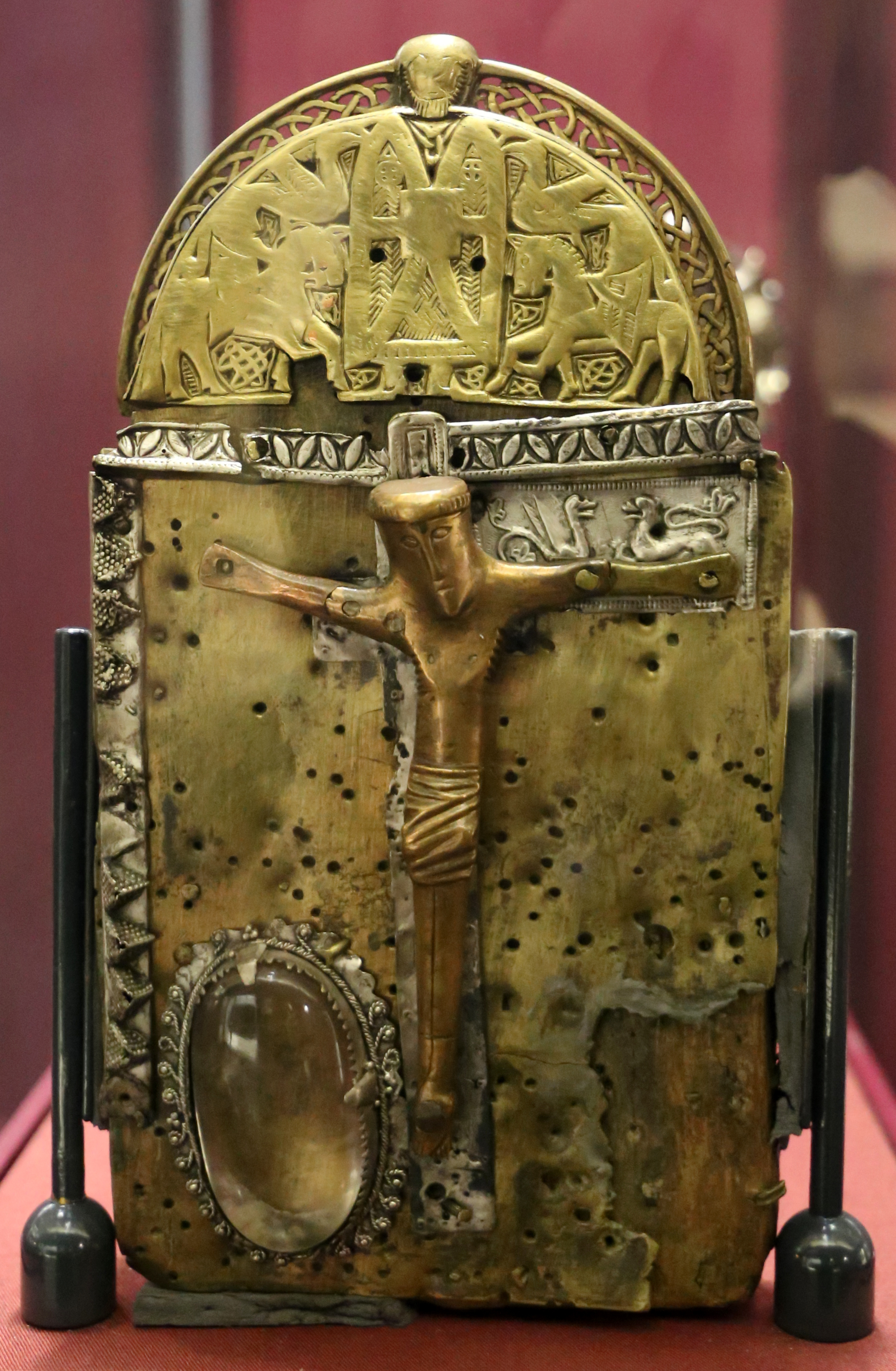
- Front panels of the shrine
- Material: Wood, silver, bronze, rock crystal, niello. Brass and silver nails.
- Size: Height: 23 cm (9.1 in); Width: 12 cm (4.7 in)
- Created: 9th or 10th century; Refurbished in the 15th century
- Period/culture: Early Medieval, Insular
- Discovered: Before 1682; Templecross, County Westmeath, Ireland
- Present location: National Museum of Ireland, Dublin
- Identification: NMI 1887:145

The Corp Naomh (Irish pronunciation: [kɔɾˠpˠ n̪ˠiːvˠ], lit. 'Holy or Sacred Body') is an Irish bell shrine made in the 9th or 10th century to enclose a now-lost hand-bell, which probably dated to c. 600 to 900 AD and belonged to an early Irish saint. The shrine was rediscovered sometime before 1682 at Tristernagh Abbey, near Templecross, County Westmeath. The shrine is 23 cm (9.1 in) high and 12 cm (4.7 in) wide. It was heavily refurbished and added to during a second phase of embellishment in the 15th century, and now consists of cast and sheet bronze plates mounted on a wooden core decorated with silver, niello and rock crystal. It is severely damaged with extensive losses and wear across almost all of its parts, and when discovered a block of wood had been substituted for the bell itself. The remaining elements are considered of high historical and artistic value by archaeologists and art historians.

Sections from its original, early Medieval phase include the cross on the reverse and the ornate semi-circular cap, which shows a bearded cleric holding a book. He is surrounded by horsemen above whom are large birds seemingly about to take flight. It was extensively refurbished in the 15th (and possibly 16th) centuries when the central bronze crucifix, the griffin and lion panel, the stamped border panels and the backing plate were added. The badly damaged crucifix and large enamel stud on the front date from at least the 15th century.

The shrine's medieval provenance is incomplete. It was probably held by hereditary keepers after the dissolution of Tristernagh Abbey in 1536 until it passed into the possession of the Anglo-Irish owners of the site. The Corp Naomh was first exhibited in 1853 by the Royal Irish Academy (RIA) and was transferred to the National Museum of Ireland in 1887.

== Discovery and provenance ==
The Corp Naomh was rediscovered sometime before 1682 on the grounds of the now ruined Tristernagh Abbey in Templecross, County Westmeath, founded c. 1200 as an Augustinian priory. It is first mentioned and described in Henry Piers' Chorographical Description of the County of Westmeath (written 1682, published 1770). Piers (1629–1691) was an MP, antiquarian and the owner of the land on which the abbey was located. Although recognising the object as a reliquary, Piers assumed it to have been a container for a small manuscript. When finally opened it was found to contain a block of wood, which is now presumed by archaeologists to have been a substitute for a saint's hand-bell, and was presumably left in place to prevent the metal's inward collapse.

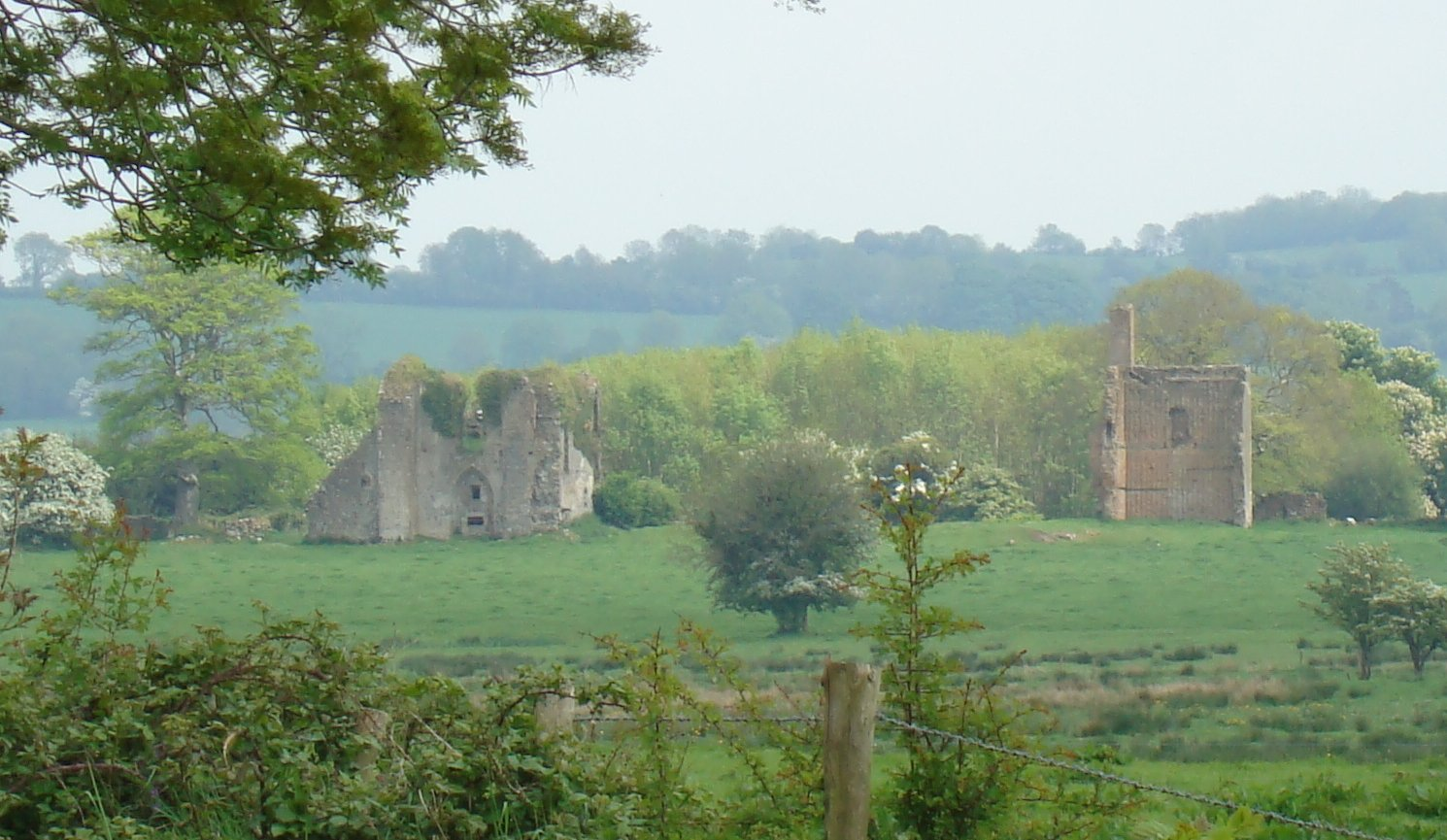
Ruins of Tristernagh Abbey

The shrine's cap and crest date to the 11th or 12th centuries; the crucifixion and other parts of the main face are 15th-century additions. Although its early medieval provenance is unknown, it is generally accepted that the early modern additions were completed at Tristernagh, where it was located when brought to the attention of Piers. Historians consider it probable that the priory invested in upgrading the shrine to redeem and re-establish itself after it faced charges of treason in 1468 "for joining with Irish enemies and English rebels in raiding and burning the town of Taghmon and in destroying many of the king's loyal subjects".

Little is known of its early modern provenance. It was probably held by hereditary keepers after the 1536 dissolution of the abbey. Piers received the shrine at Tristernagh from an unidentified man he described as "a certain gentleman, a great zealot of the Romish Church". Cautious not to damage the structure, he did not open the shrine (it was first opened in the late 19th century), but suspected that it contained "a bible of the smaller volume" (ie a "pocket bible" or pocket gospel book). He wrote that "whether it have anything hidden within it, is known I believe to no man living, but it ... is held to this day in great veneration by all of the Romanish persuasion that live hereabout". Piers recorded that the shrine had an on-going tradition of use for swearing oaths, and noted that it was held in reverence and was of such "peculiar solemnity" that any man who "delivered falsehoods ... is sure to be visited in some dreadful manner".

The Corp Naomh was first exhibited at the Irish Industrial Exhibition world's fair held in Cork in 1852, where it was shown alongside recently discovered Insular artworks such as the Cathach, Saint Manchan's Shrine and the Cross of Cong. It was acquired c. 1868 for £21 by the Royal Irish Academy (RIA) from Messrs. Hodges Figgis & Co. of Grafton Street, Dublin, before it was bequeathed in 1887 to the National Museum of Ireland.

== Function ==
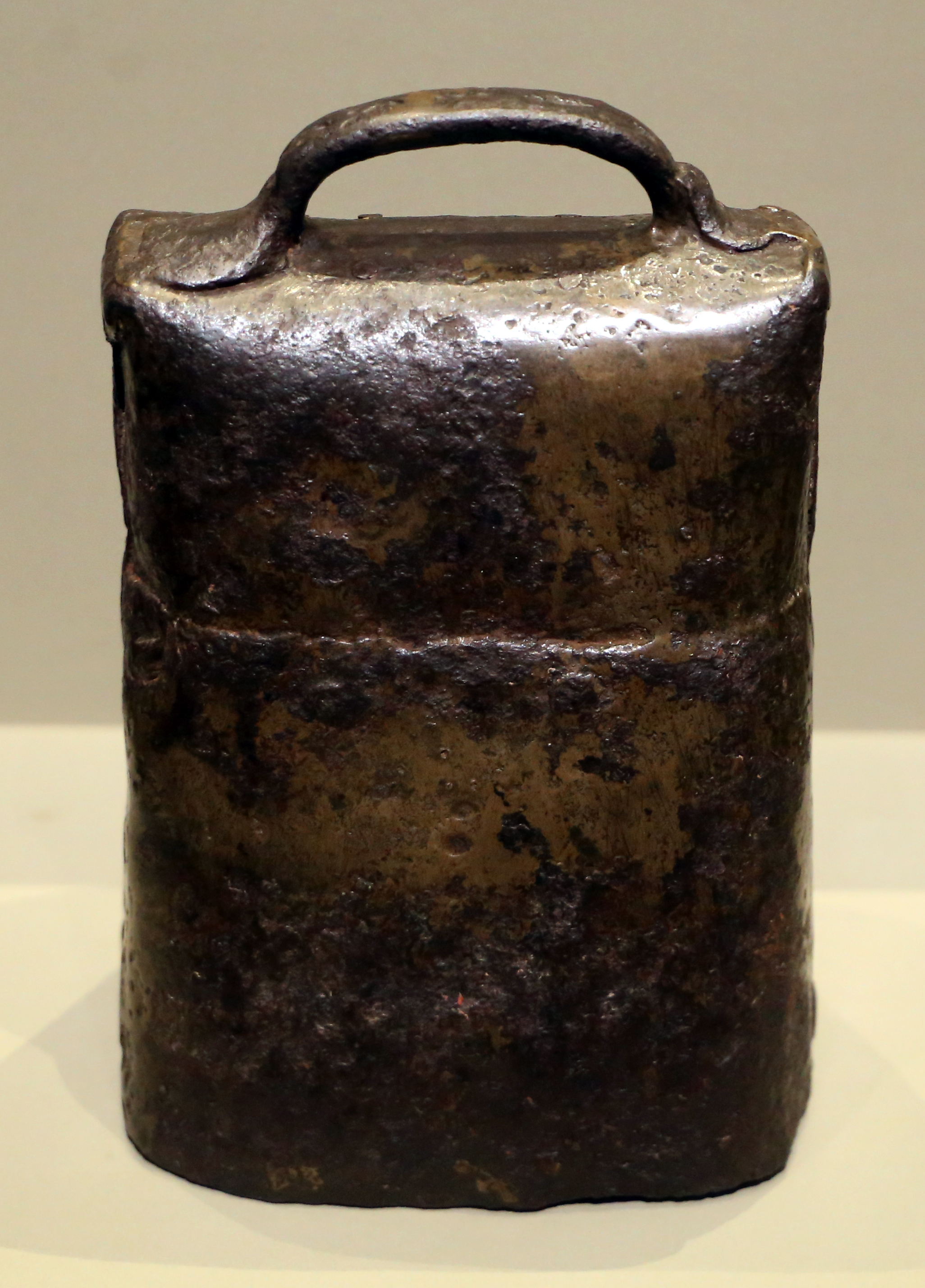
St. Patrick's bell, c. 500; enshrined c. 1100

Hand-bells were primarily used in early Medieval Ireland to call monks to prayer, and over time those associated with a saint became insignia of clerical office. By 1100 the more important bells from the 600–900 period were treated as relics, having the perceived ability to heal sickness, secure oaths or grant fortune. A few were preserved in the late 11th and early 12th centuries, during a period when the enshrinement of relics by the highest-ranking metalworkers was at its height. Like Cumdachs (book-shaped reliquaries) and house-shaped shrines, bell-shrines are essentially metal containers. Most embellished bell coverings, including the Corp Naomh, follow the general shape of a tubular hand-bell and are capped with a semicircular crest outlining the shape of a handle.

The "Corp Naomh" title is modern and translates from Irish as the "sacred (or holy) body". The wording is based on the large central figure of Jesus on the cross. At 23 cm (9.1 in) high, the shrine is around the size of a pocket bible and until the mid-19th century was assumed to be a container for a manuscript. Its shape and size fall within the archeologist Cormac Bourke's "Class 1" classification of hand-bells; that is bells produced between 600 and 900 of iron coated with bronze, largely in the west-midlands of Ireland.

== Description ==
The shrine is 23 cm (9.1 in) high and 12 cm (4.7 in) wide. It consists of a bronze sheet and cast metal protruding mounts attached to a slim wooden core. The semi-circular cap and crest at the top and the nielloed bronze cross on the main body of the reverse date from the 9th or 10th century. The stamped side-border panels are 15th-century, and the crucifixion and oval crystal on the front are possibly 16th-century.

=== Cap and crest ===
The semicircular cap is 12 cm (4.7 in) high. It consists of a hollow bronze casting decorated front and back with human and animal figures, with an openwork crest running along its upper border. The front side contains a bearded cleric surrounded by horsemen and birds, and the reverse shows two confronted animals and foliate coils. Although the reverse was once as decorated as the front, it is now severely damaged and has significant losses. The shape of the reverse echoes that of the front, but contains an extra border between the crest and figurative panels, composed of hatched bands. It contains a series of much thinner confronted animals with hind legs extending forwards. The crest is of bronze and decorated on both sides with three-loop running-knot interlace patterns in openwork and lined at the top with a plain-ridge upper-border.

==== Cleric ====
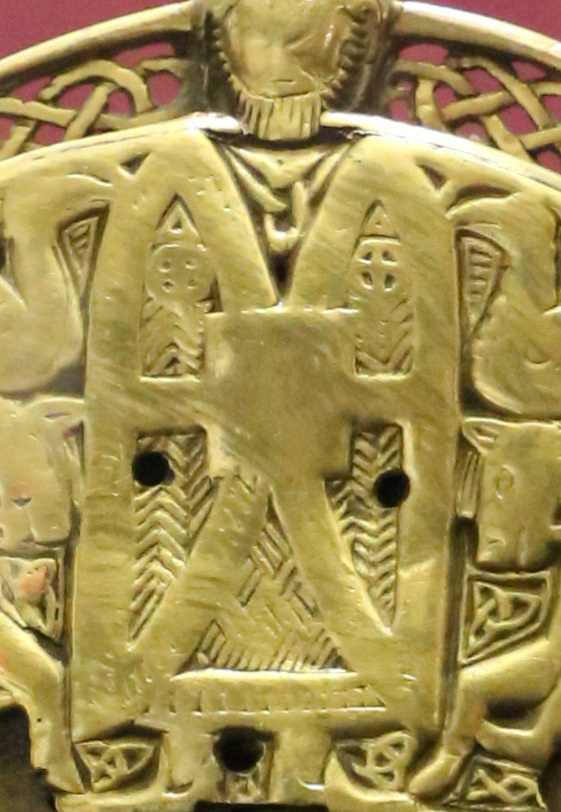
Detail of the cleric with riders, horses and birds to his left and right. The crest's interlaced patterns can be seen at the top.

The cap is dominated by a central figure standing in full profile. His body reaches the full-length of the cap and the top is within the crest and the back of his head protrudes into the reverse. He is assumed to be an ecclesiastic based on his clothing, the fact he is holding a book, and that he is partially bald – a contemporary short-hand for indicating clerics or monks. Given his similarities to the figures on the 11th-century Soiscél Molaisse reliquary, several scholars have suggested that he is one of the Four Evangelists. The figure is in low relief and poor condition: his face is badly worn and his lower body contains three large puncture holes from later rivets. The remaining discernable facial features include his mouth and nose, one eye, and his beard. He wears a full-length and according to Bourke a "wing-like" tunic or cloak rendered with cross hatching on enamel and niello, and an undergarment with similar borders at the lower hem. Raised diagonal bands divide the robe into four sections, between which are decorative panels containing incised (marked with cuts) herringbone, basket-weaved hatched and chevron patterns. His shoes have pointed toes, high tongues and elaborate ankles; a triquetra knot design is placed above each foot. The pattern between his legs was probably a ring-knot but is now punctured by a rivet hole.

His shoulders have circular ornaments and cross hatchings resembling early versions of the Orthodox cross. The 19th-century historian William Frazer described these and their "equal-rayed limbs" as an example of the then "popular and universally worn" Patrick's Cross type, which he said were "distinctive emblems of Christian teaching ... [that were a] recognised badge of those who possessed rank in the Celtic churches". Other early works containing similar designs include figures on a stone cross from Meigle, Scotland, and the 12th-century Irish Saint Manchan's Shrine. Above the circular ornaments are triangular shapes, possibly representing Celtic brooches.

==== Horsemen and birds ====
The four panels surrounding the cleric show mirroring scenes of riders and their horses placed below large birds, all of whom are in profile and face towards the cleric. The riders and horses are in low relief, and designed in the so-called "Kells style" found on riding figures in earlier or contemporary illuminated manuscripts, high crosses, carved pillars and Insular metalwork. The type is named after folios 58 and 255 from the Book of Kells, and figures on the "Market" high cross at Kells abbey.

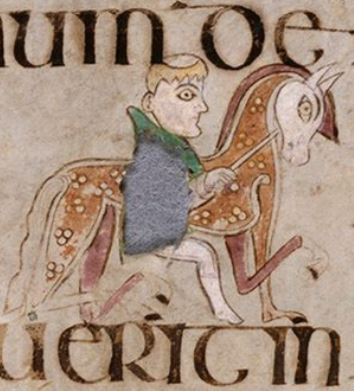
Horseman in folio 255 verso (Luke), Book of Kells, 9th century

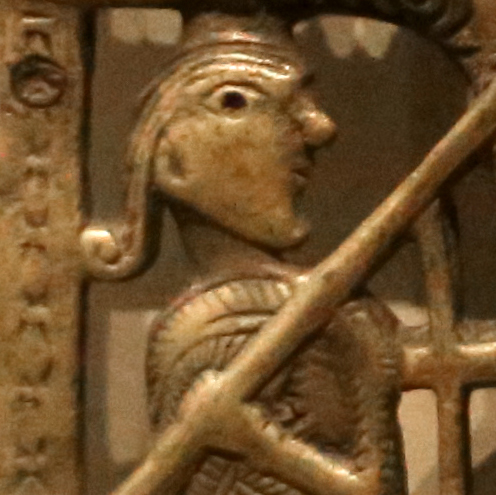
Figure presumed to be Longinus on the Clonmacnoise Crucifixion Plaque, c. 1090–1110

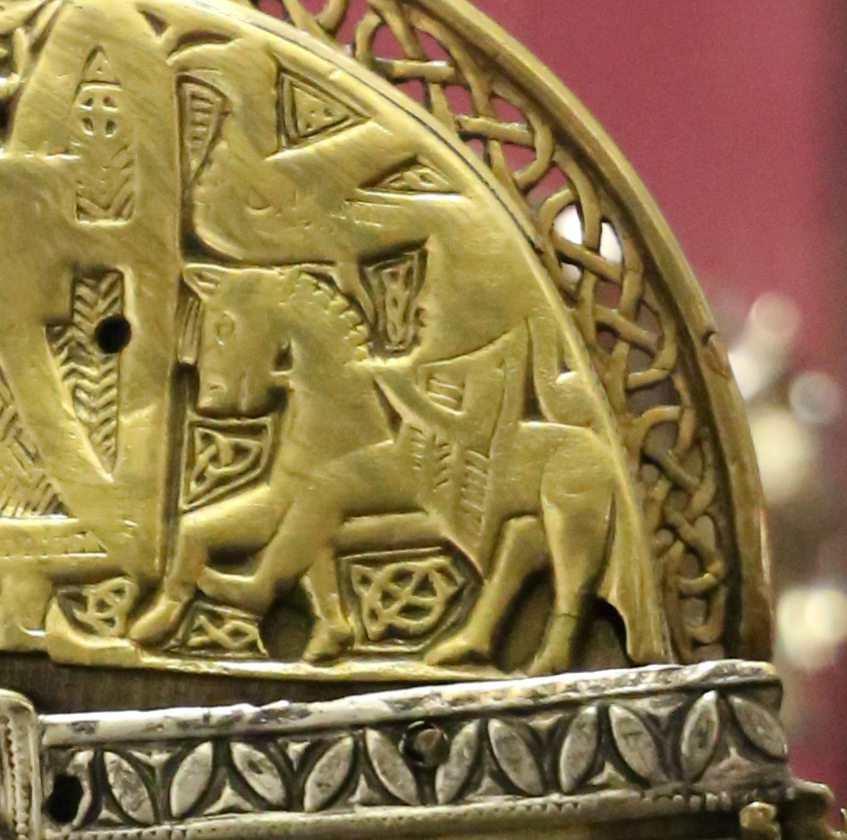
Rider and bird on the right-hand side of the Corp Naommh's cap

In all examples, the horse is small enough to be a pony, has a long and thick mane, a downwards-looking head and eyes, and a long, wide tail. The hind legs are positioned low underneath its body, with forelegs extended forwards as if about to gallop. In this tradition, the riders' hands are placed inside their cloaks, and they sit low on their horses, although their legs are thrown forward below the horse's knees rather than above its shoulders. In some instances, including the miniature in folio 255 verso of the Book of Kells, figures on late-10th-century Clonmacnoise Crucifixion Plaque, and warriors on the 11th-century shrine of the Stowe Missal, the riders have short fringes and a bald crown. Here and in most later examples their hair is longer and dramatically curls upwards at the back.

Unusually, the riders in the Corp Naomh wear beards, which are unusually long and pointed for Insular art. Two oversized birds perch on the horses heads and necks. They have small curved beaks and long (but truncated by the frame) wings poised to take flight. Based on contemporary iconography, Frazer speculates that they represent the martyrdom of the cleric they are facing towards. Like the riders' cloaks, the birds' wings are marked with diagonal ribs and herringbone patterns.

=== Front plate ===
==== Crucifixion ====
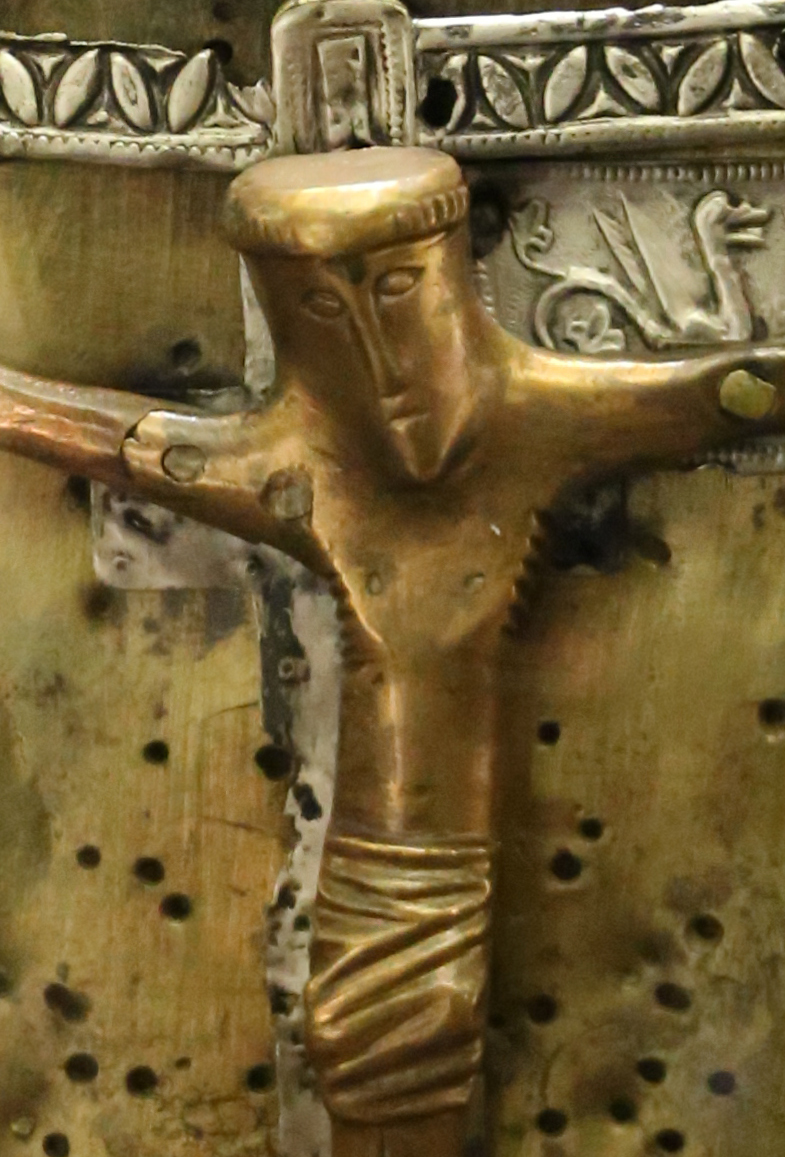
Christ with closed eyes and drooping head

The bronze figure of Jesus and the silver cross were both added in the 15th century but are now badly damaged. The figure is naked except for a horizontally drawn loincloth. He is obviously dead: his eyes are closed, his head droops to the right, the body is rigid, his ribs are extended, and the chest is flat. He has thick flat-topped hair formed from a cap-like moulding with vertical groves to indicate hair strands. The elements of his head and face are incised into the bronze and are in good condition, although his ears are missing. His chest is outlined by a differentiated surface, his ribs and nipples are represented by impressions, and his navel by a deep-cut incision. His legs are crossed and lined with incisions to indicate toes.

The hands were at some point lost and replaced with crudely described rods. The horizontal design above his head is badly damaged and may have once been either a crown or a band of hair. The surrounding plating is 10th-century but is mostly lost. Equally the bronze backing, also 10th-century, is severely damaged especially on the lower right-hand side.

==== Confronted animals ====
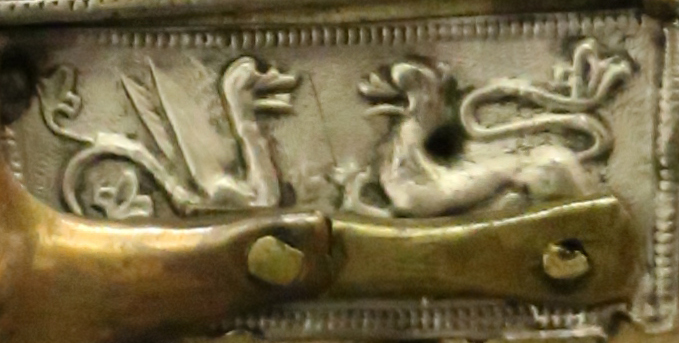
Opposing griffin and lion above Jesus' left arm

The embossed silver panel above Christ's left arm shows a dragon or griffin and a lion confronting each other in symmetrical poses. Their hindlegs are extended as if about to attack each other. Attacking griffins and lions became a common motif in 15th-century Irish art, notably on the Dunvegan Cup which contains a 1493 engraving whose similarity to those on the Corp Naomh have been used to date the latter additions to the main panel.

Examples from this period are so similar that some art historians suggest they were copied from or based on a single die-stamp. The art historian Susanne McNab speculates that the Corp Naomh design comes from the same stamp as the 14th-century additions to the Cathach's shrine. The remnants of other, but lost, embossed plates survive, including a strip of dotted tetrahedra (triangular pyramidal shapes) along the left margin. A badly damaged floral pattern runs along the top border.

=== Reverse plate ===
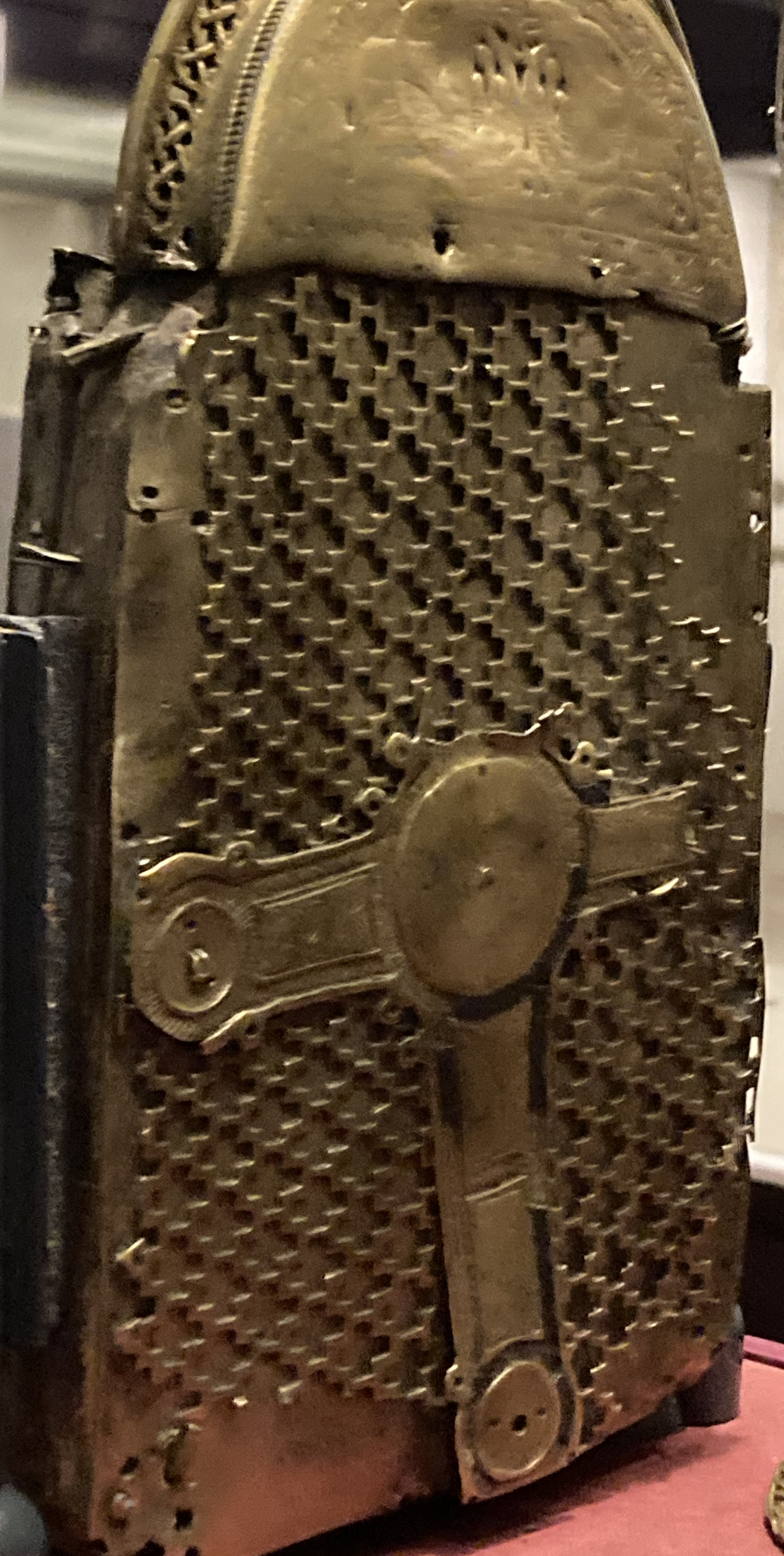
The shrine's reverse

The back plate is made from bronze and dominated by a grid of interlinked equal-sized openwork crosses. Its badly damaged upper-side panels are stepped so that the plate is narrower at the top than at the base. The crosses are positioned on a separate plate and are similar to those on the Soiscél Molaisse, the Shrine of Miosach (both 11th-century), and other contemporary Irish relic containers.

The crosses date to roughly the initial 9th- or 10th-century phase, but may have been produced slightly later independently. A full-length but now incomplete cross is riveted to the openwork plate. Both its upper shaft and the end of its left arm are missing, although the remaining traces indicate that they matched, in length and width, the corresponding sections of the cross on the front. Each arm is positioned within a band of interlace, and the lower shaft is within fields of interlace. In turn, the interlace is lined with niello, most of which is lost; only traces of inset silver wires remain.

=== Leather case ===
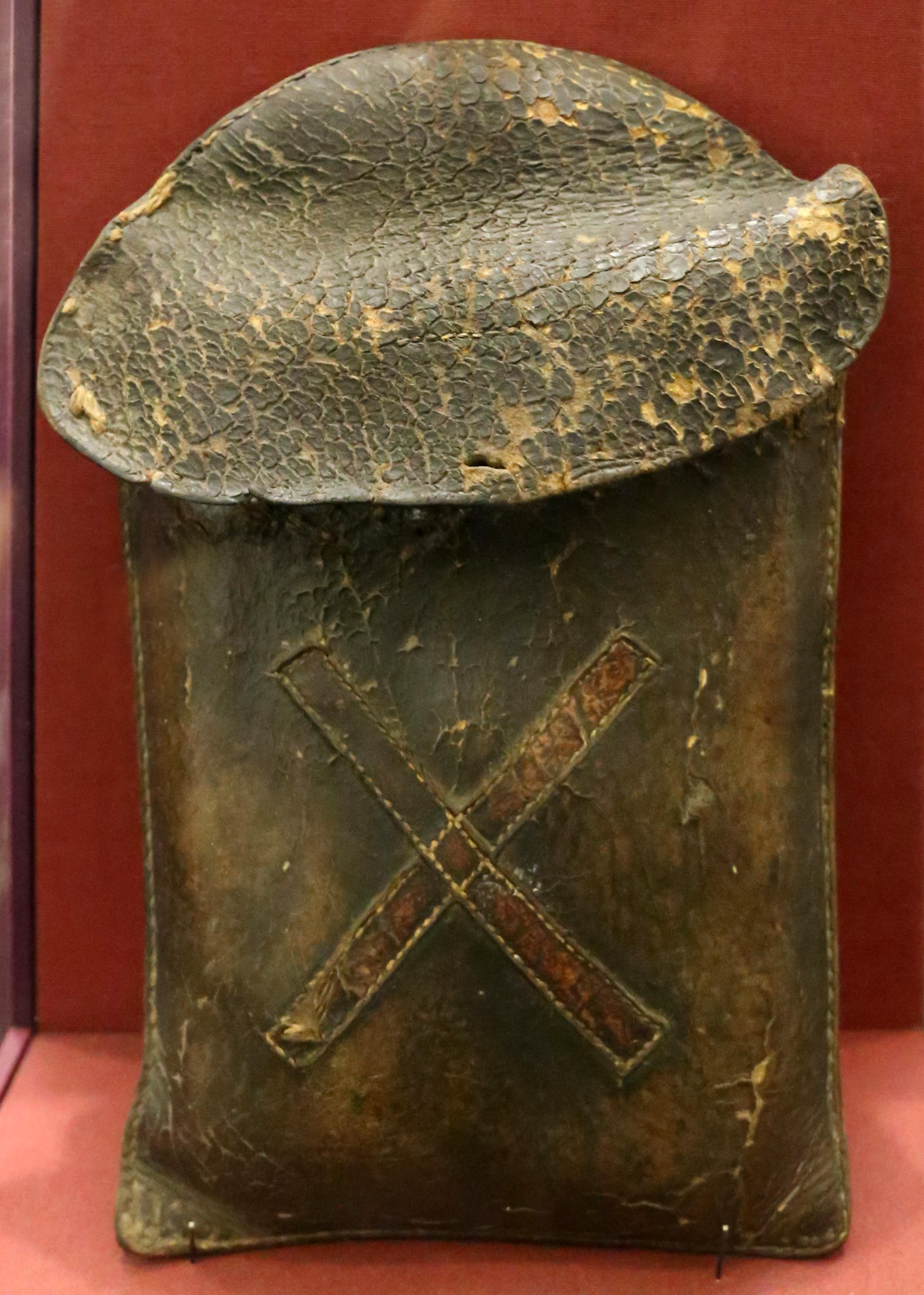
The leather case

An undated portable leather case (French: polaire) was also acquired by the RIA in 1887. It consists of three pieces edge-sewn together: rectangular front and backs ends, and an oval flap which corresponds in shape to the shrine's cap and thus the bell's handle. The flap has rows of holes larger than those for the stitches attaching the case's three main components, indicating that the case was once sewn shut, so that, according to Bourke "the Corp Naomh could be used but not seen". The diagonal cross on the case's front consists of two overlapping leather straps sewn onto the case. Although it cannot be dated on stylistic grounds, the case is generally assumed to be post-medieval.

== Sources ==
- Betham, William. Irish Antiquarian Researches, 1826. Republished by Palala Press in 2015.
- Bourke, Cormac. The Early Medieval Hand-bells of Ireland and Britain. Dublin: Wordwell, 2020. ISBN 978-0901777881
- Bourke, Cormac. "Bell-Shrines". In: Moss, Rachel. Medieval c. 400—c. 1600. "Art and Architecture of Ireland" series. London: Yale University Press, 2014. ISBN 978-0-3001-7919-4
- Bourke, Cormac. "Early Irish Hand-Bells". The Journal of the Royal Society of Antiquaries of Ireland, volume 110, 1980. JSTOR 25508775
- Coffey, George. Guide to the Celtic Antiquities of the Christian Period Preserved in the National Museum, Dublin. Royal Irish Academy Collection; Hodges & Figgis, 1910.
- Crawford, Henry. "A Descriptive List of Irish Shrines and Reliquaries. Part I". Journal of the Royal Society of Antiquaries of Ireland, sixth series, volume 13, No. 1, 30 June 1923. JSTOR 25513282
- De Paor, Marie. "The Viking Impact". In: Treasures of Early Irish Art, 1500 B.C. to 1500 A.D.. NY: Metropolitan Museum of Art, 1977. ISBN 978-0870991646
- Frazer, William. "On "Patrick's Crosses": Stone, Bronze and Gold". Journal of the Royal Society of Antiquaries of Ireland, fifth series, volume 9, No. 1, 31 March 1899
- Henry, Françoise. Irish Art during the Viking Invasions (800–1020 A.D.). London: Methuen & Co, 1967
- Johnson, Ruth. "A descriptive account of the decoration on the early medieval shrine known as the Corp Naomh". In: Condit, Tom; Corlett, Christiaan (eds). Above & Beyond: Essays in Memory of Leo Swan. Dublin: Wordwell, 2005. ISBN 978-1869857868
- Jones, Thomas Dillon. Record of the Great Industrial Exhibition, 1853. Dublin: J. Falconer, 1854
- McNab, Susanne. Celtic Antecedents to the Treatment of the Human Figure in Early Irish Art. In: Hourihane, Colum (ed). "From Ireland Coming: Irish Art from the Early Christian to the Late Gothic Period and Its European Context". Princeton University Press, 2001. ISBN 978-0691088242
- Moss, Rachel. Making and Meaning in Insular Art: Proceedings of the Fifth International Conference on Insular Art. Dublin: Four Courts Press, 2007. ISBN 978-1851829866
- Ó Floinn, Raghnall; Wallace, Patrick. Treasures of the National Museum of Ireland: Irish Antiquities. Dublin: National Museum of Ireland, 2002. ISBN 978-0717128297
- Overbey, Karen. Sacral Geographies: Saints, Shrines and Territory in Medieval Ireland. Turnhout: Brepols, 2012. ISBN 978-2503527673
- Piers, Henry. "A Chorographical Description of the County of West-Meath (1682)". Meath: Meath Archaeological and Historical Society, 1981. ISBN 978-0950033242
