= Ballynacargy =

Village in County Westmeath, Ireland

Ballynacargy Baile na Carraige
- Village
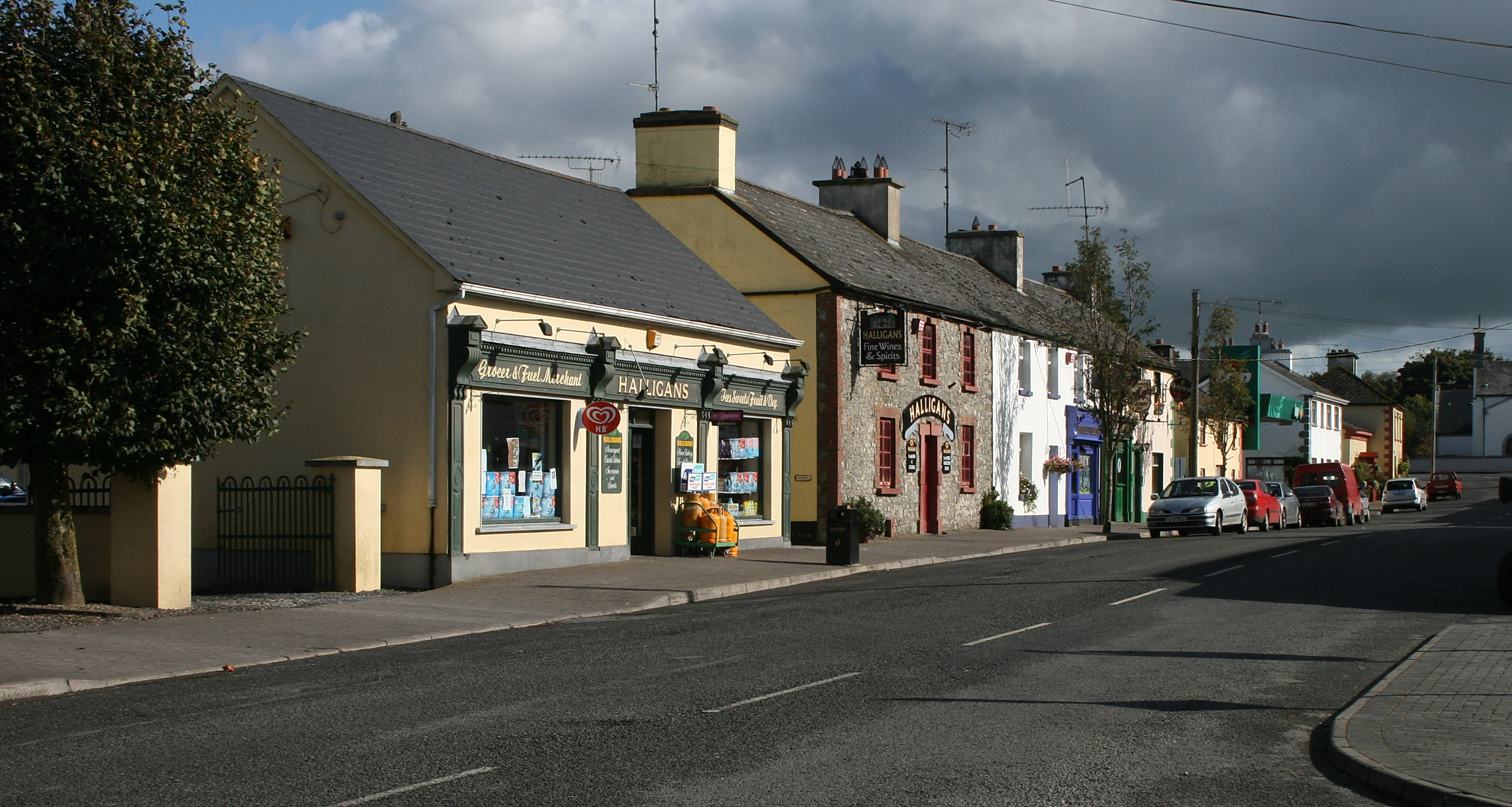
- Ballynacargy's main street

- Location in Ireland
- Coordinates: 53°34′58″N 7°32′14″W
- Country: Ireland
- Province: Leinster
- County: County Westmeath

Government
  - Dáil Éireann: Longford–Westmeath

Area
  - Total: 0.372 km^{2} (0.144 sq mi)

Population (2016)
  - Total: 277
  - Density: 745/km^{2} (1,930/sq mi)
- Time zone: UTC+0 (WET)
  - Summer (DST): UTC-1 (IST (WEST))

Ballynacargy, or Ballinacarrigy, (Irish: Baile na Carraige) is a small village in County Westmeath, Ireland. 15 km north-west of Mullingar, it is on the Royal Canal and the R393 road.

== Transport ==
Bus Éireann route 448 provides a link to Mullingar on Fridays only departing Ballynacargy late morning and returning from Mullingar early afternoon. The is also a Local Link bus service to/from Mullingar on Thursdays.

The nearest railway station is Mullingar railway station approximately 15 kilometres distant.

The last official commercial navigation of the canal took place in 1955.

== History ==
Ballynacargy is thought to have been largely established in the mid-18th century by the Malone family of Baronstown, who intended to create a linen industry in the area. While the linen trade failed to thrive, the village gained a harbour on the Royal Canal which opened in 1817, and developed as a market serving the surrounding district. However, the origins of the village go back much further, and its immediate area includes some of the most important historical and archaeological sites in Westmeath. The first recorded reference dates from 1537 after the dissolution of the nearby monastery at Tristernagh Abbey.

=== Kilbixy ===
It is thought that the village of Ballynacargy initially grew as a result of the decline of nearby Kilbixy, an important town in Meath 500 years ago.

Kilbixy (from the Irish Cill Bigsighe) developed around an early Christian church reputedly founded by Saint Bigseach, a handmaiden of Saint Brigid whose feast day was celebrated on 28 June and 4 October. A castle was built here by Walter de Lacy in 1192, following which a Norman settlement grew up and was granted Borough rights. Kilbixy was said to have once had twelve burgesses and a mayor, along with the castle, church, a market and a dock on the shore of Lough Iron, but declined and was deserted during the 15th century after being repeatedly attacked and burned, first in 1430 by Owen O'Neill, King of Tyrone, and then by the locally powerful Geoghegan family. By the 17th century only a few ruins remained of the former town. Despite the town's disappearance, the parish still bears the name of Kilbixy.

The Church of Ireland parish church, dedicated to St Bigseach, is located within the former area of Kilbixy town itself, in Baronstown Demesne townland to the north of Ballynacargy village. It was built, probably on the same site as Kilbixy's original church, in 1798 to the designs of James Wyatt, one of the greatest architects of the time: the area around it remains one of the best-preserved examples of a deserted medieval borough in Ireland. In 1980 a 7th-century stone was discovered in the circular churchyard, showing it to have been a very early foundation. The 1798 church was funded by The 1st Baron Sunderlin, and is a good example of a church of the period sited to provide a picturesque landscape view from the local big house. Lord Sunderlin also built a large mausoleum next to the church: Sunderlin's brother, the celebrated Shakespearean scholar Edmond Malone, is also buried there. In the 19th century, St Bigseach's churchyard still remained a favoured place of interment for local Catholic families, as well as Anglicans. There is a holy well, Tobar Bigsighe ("the well of Bigseach") nearby.

=== Templecross ===
Northeast of the village in the townland of Tristernagh Demesne are the ruins of Templecross Church, from where the ruins of Tristernagh Abbey are visible. Templecross is probably late-medieval in date, with a west tower built in c. 1575. Within the church is the tomb of the landowner Henry Piers (1568–1623), who after embracing Catholicism and travelling widely in Europe, restored the Abbey buildings and church: at the tomb's foot was a memorial to Gerald Farrell and his wife Elizabeth, who had been foster parents of Sir Henry Piers, 1st Baronet. By the late 17th century the building had been converted to a Protestant church, as the main church at Kilbixy was then derelict. Templecross churchyard contains a number of historic monuments: there are several to 19th-century Catholic priests who served Ballinacargy, including the Rev. John Cantwell, PP, who was well known locally for his work with the poor and his promotion of education. The base of an early stone cross is also located in the churchyard. A lane known locally as Bóithrín na marbh ("little road of the dead") once ran from the north side of the churchyard to Ballynacroghy or Gallowstown townland.

=== Tristernagh Abbey ===
The house of Augustinian canons, also known as the Priory of Kilbixy, was founded in 1192 by Geoffrey de Constantine. Attached to the monastery was a leper hospital, a rarity at that time. The priory achieved some fame from its establishment until 1536 when the commissioners of the English King Henry VIII ransacked and destroyed it.

== Notable people ==
- Joe Dolan (1939–2007), Irish entertainer, recording artiste, and pop singer.
- Michael Duggan (1827–1888), emigrated to Argentina in 1859 and made a vast fortune as a sheep farmer: at the time of his death he was thought to be the richest Irishman in the world.
- Anthony Malone (1700–1776), the main local landowner and also an eminent lawyer and politician. He was the uncle of Lord Sunderlin and his brother Edmund.
- Willie Penrose (b.1956), politician and member of Dáil Éireann from 1992 to 2020 as a representative of the Labour Party.
- Robert Troy (b.1982), politician and Member of Dáil Éireann since 2011 as a representative of the Fianna Fáil party.

== See also ==
- List of towns and villages in Ireland
