= Henry Piers =

Anglo-Irish landowner and politician

Henry Piers, Esq (1568–1623), also spelled Henry Pierce or Perse, was an Anglo-Irish landowner and Member of Parliament who owned the estate of Tristernagh Abbey in the early 17th century.

== Life ==
He was the only son of William Piers, a Yorkshireman who had been granted land in Ireland by Elizabeth I in return for military and other services. His mother was Ann Holt, of Holt Castle, Wrexham, on the north Welsh borders. Henry married Jane Jones, daughter of Thomas Jones, Archbishop of Dublin and Margaret Purdon, and had eight children. He served as the secretary to Lord Deputy Chichester and represented the potwalloper constituency of Baltimore in the 1613 Irish Parliament. In addition to his father's estates at Tristernagh he also acquired plantation land in Cavan.

Henry Piers converted to Catholicism in his late 20s, after "conversing with many of the Romish church" according to a family memoir (which also claimed he did so "against the advice of his wife"). Piers was particularly influenced by his strong friendship with neighbouring "Old English" families who had retained the Catholic faith. He subsequently travelled on the Continent for some 8 years and on his return converted a number of his children, one of whom, Thomas Piers, was said to have become a Franciscan friar. He also wrote a book describing his travels, the manuscript of which eventually came to Sir James Ware, whose sister married into the Piers family. The manuscript was recently rediscovered and has proved an important source of information on the Irish laity in Europe during the time of the Nine Years' War.

Henry Piers was buried in a tomb in the now-ruined chapel of Templecross, which stands at the gates to Tristernagh demesne. An altar monument bearing the Piers arms and a Latin inscription still exists in the ruins; the inscription commemorates Henry Piers as a "hospitable native" of "renowned piety" who repaired Tristernagh Abbey. A translation and drawing of the inscription are given in James Woods' Annals of Westmeath.

== Family ==
Piers was succeeded in his estates by his eldest son, who was later knighted, becoming Sir William Piers. Henry's grandson Sir Henry Piers, a soldier and notable antiquarian, was created a baronet in 1661, founding the Piers baronets of Tristernagh. One of his descendants was Sir John Piers, who was involved in a notorious adultery case in 1807, and was the subject of a poem by John Betjeman.

Political offices
Preceded by John Bingley	Chief Secretary for Ireland; 1605–1616	Succeeded by Henry Holcroft
