= Robert Ware =

Robert Ware (23 October 1639 – 7 April 1697) was a historian and forger of historical documents, which he applied to Protestant polemics.

Ware was born in Dublin, the son of historian Sir James Ware and his wife Elizabeth Newman. Nothing is known of his education, and his father in London likely educated him. On his father's death in 1666, he inherited a large collection of historical manuscripts, which he eventually sold to Henry Hyde, 2nd Earl of Clarendon in 1686. While the manuscripts were in his possession, he added a large number of fabricated documents to them. This put him at odds with Roman Catholic interests in Ireland, and he went into exile in England during the reign of King James II of England.

On 24 December 1666, Robert married Elizabeth, the daughter of his cousin Sir Henry Piers, 1st Baronet and Mary Jones. He died in 1697 (1696 old style), survived by one son.

Ware's invented documents misled historians of the Protestant Reformation for centuries afterwards; Thomas Edward Bridgett finally exposed him in 1890, but it was not until the 20th century that historians could sort out the implications of his findings.
