= Sir John Piers, 6th Baronet =

Irish Baronet

Sir John Bennett Piers, 6th Baronet of Tristernagh Abbey (1772 – 22 July 1845), was an Anglo-Irish baronet. He is primarily remembered for his involvement in the Cloncurry case, an adultery scandal that took place in the early 19th century. Additionally, he is known for being the subject of an early poem by John Betjeman titled Sir John Piers.

== Life ==
Piers came from a long-established Anglo-Irish gentry family, known for their residence at Tristernagh Abbey in County Westmeath. The family were descended from William Piers, who had been granted the Abbey lands by Elizabeth I. Sir Henry Piers, William's great-grandson, was later granted a baronetcy in 1661. By the time of his descendant Sir John Piers, the Abbey had been demolished and incorporated into a house which had itself fallen into disrepair, and which was allegedly the inspiration for Maria Edgeworth's Castle Rackrent.

Sir John was the eldest son of Sir Pigott William Piers, 5th Baronet, and his wife Elizabeth Smythe, and succeeded to his father's title and estates in 1798. He first married Mary Pratt, the daughter of Rev. Joseph Pratt of Cabra, in August 1796; she died in 1798. Piers later gained a reputation as a rakehell, duelist, and gambler. In 1803, he met Elizabeth Denny, an actress at Astley's theatre in Dublin, and set up a household with her. The couple had seven children: Henrietta, Henry, John Edward, William Stapleton, George, Louisa, and Florence, born between 1803 and 1819.

== The Cloncurry scandal ==
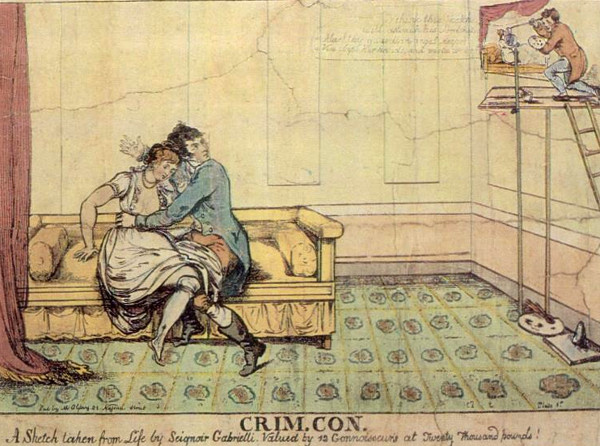
Crim. Con, an 1807-8 satirical print referencing the Cloncurry scandal and court case. Piers and Lady Cloncurry are observed by the painter Gabrielli. The caption notes that the "sketch [...] has been valued at Twenty Thousand pounds!", in reference to the huge damages awarded to Lord Cloncurry.

Piers gained public notoriety after an 1807 "criminal conversation" trial. He was seen with Elizabeth Georgiana, Lady Cloncurry, the wife of an old school friend (and creditor), Lord Cloncurry, and it later emerged they had been conducting an affair. Moreover, it was established that Piers had seduced Lady Cloncurry as part of a bet: if he succeeded, a sum of money would be deposited in his bank account by a person whose identity was never revealed. The evidence included letters in which he addressed Lady Cloncurry, sensationally by the standards of the time, as his "beloved Eliza", and referred to her husband as a "poor tame wretch".

Piers did not attend the trial, having fled to the Isle of Man, and Lord Cloncurry was awarded the enormous sum of £20,000 in damages, the joint largest recorded award ever in a criminal conversation case. Lady Cloncurry was sent home to her father, General Charles Morgan, and divorced by her husband in 1811 (each of them subsequently remarried). The scandal was of great interest to the media of the time, particularly in view of what was regarded as the "humorous" circumstances of the discovery. The "preoccupied" couple had been observed by an Italian mural-painter, Gaspare Gabrielli, who was working in the same room at the Cloncurrys' country house, Lyons Demesne, on a ladder.

== The Isle of Man ==
Piers and his partner Miss Denny took a house in Braddan and became active in island society. He was not, however, necessarily able to avoid his old ways, as he is recorded as appearing before the Deemster along with two others (Major-General Stapleton and Captain Edwards) after they started a fight while part of a theatre audience. He was also recorded, a matter of months after the trial, as fighting a duel with a John Meredith Esq. over a bet made at dinner; Meredith fired early, missing Piers, who "advanced towards him, and ordered him to go down to his knees and beg, for pardon and life". Meredith was later shot dead in another duel by a Mr Boyes or Boyce, one of Piers' seconds. Hannah Bullock, who in 1816 published the History of the Isle of Man, commented that from the arrival of Piers and his associates "peace spread her wings, and for many months was heard of no more [...] I am not exaggerating when I assert that every evening closed upon a quarrel". In 1810, it was reported that Piers, still a figure of public interest, had finally shot himself after having "debauched the daughter of a respectable clergyman", but the reports were evidently exaggerated.

It was claimed that Piers and Miss Denny - subsequently Lady Piers - were married in May 1815, while still living on the Isle of Man. The marriage was held privately at their home: according to Piers this was because his mother disapproved of the relationship, and he wanted to have the opportunity of explaining the circumstances to her before making the marriage public. This caused problems as there was no evidence of the special licence of the Bishop of Sodor and Man, by authority of which the marriage was supposed to have been solemnized, so that the marriage might not have been legal under Manx law. Lady Piers later testified that "I am quite certain that [Piers] intended to solemnize a legal and valid marriage, as he frequently expressed to me an anxious wish that I might have issue which would inherit his estates". The couple's youngest daughters, Louisa and Florence, took action against Piers' heir, his brother Henry Samuel Piers, to recover the money they claimed due to them as John Piers' legitimate children (Piers' sons were born before the 1815 marriage). They succeeded in their claim to legitimacy, and the case (Piers v Piers) remains the leading case in English law on the presumption of marriage.

After spending several years on the Isle of Man, Piers returned to Tristernagh, where a house was built for him surrounded by a high wall to keep out his creditors. Despite this construction, he was eventually forced to pay the damages in the Cloncurry suit, with great reluctance.

== Later years ==
Piers was in court once more in 1830, when Richard Malone Esq. accused him of provoking a breach of the peace. It was claimed that Piers had fired his gun in the prosecutor's demesne "as an intentional insult" and that Piers had also written a "most severe and offensive letter" to Malone following an argument between Malone's gamekeeper and his son John. The court held that, despite his actions, Piers had not been intending to provoke Malone into fighting a duel.

Piers and his family eventually moved to Saint-Omer in France, where they lived on the small income obtainable from his estates. Piers died in 1845 and is buried in Saint-Omer. He was succeeded as baronet by his brother, but the affair had been disastrous for the family's fortunes: by the 1850s, Tristernagh was said to be "in a frightful state of delapidation, and the family estates much encumbered".

== Poem ==
One of John Betjeman's earliest published poems, first printed in the Westmeath Examiner, was titled Sir John Piers, and reimagines the scandal. Part I, The Fete Champetre, describes a fashionable picnic attended by Lord and Lady Cloncurry and Piers, "the handsomest blade in the County Westmeath"; Part II, The Attempt, is spoken by Piers to Lady Cloncurry; Part III, The Exile, describes the baronet in disgrace on the Isle of Man; and IV, The Return, is again spoken by Piers as he plans the building of his walls at Tristernagh. Part V, Tristernagh Today, is a present-day supernatural coda in which the narrator encounters something unpleasant near Tristernagh churchyard. Betjeman adopts a humorous style, parodying nineteenth-century verse forms, through much of the poem.

Betjeman also participated in a 1978 documentary on the crim. con. case, The Bold Bad Baronet, produced for BBC Northern Ireland and presented by Frank Delaney. Delaney developed the theory that Sir John Piers' partner in the "diabolical wager", who was never identified, had likely been Lord Cloncurry himself, who owned land adjacent to Piers' demesne on the shores of Lough Iron. Delaney surmised that Cloncurry had bet that Piers could not seduce Lady Cloncurry, in the knowledge that even if he lost the bet he could take Piers to court. Much of the Tristernagh estate was later bought by Cloncurry.

Baronetage of Ireland
Preceded by Pigott William Piers	Baronet (of Tristernagh Abbey); 1798–1845	Succeeded by Henry Samuel Piers
