= Pier (given name) =

Pier is a given name, a form of Peter, which may refer to:

== Pre-20th century ==
- Pier Jacopo Alari Bonacolsi (c. 1460–1528), Italian sculptor
- Pier Luigi de Borgia, 1st duke of Gandía (c. 1460–1491), Valencian noble
- Pier Luigi Carafa (1581–1655), Italian cardinal
- Pier Paolo Crescenzi (1572–1645), Italian Catholic cardinal
- Pier Gerlofs Donia (c. 1480–1520), West Frisian warrior, pirate and rebel
- Pier Luigi Farnese, Duke of Parma (1503–1547), first Duke of Parma, Piacenza and Castro
- Pier Leone Ghezzi (1674–1755), Italian Rococo painter and caricaturist
- Pier Leoni (died 1128), Roman consul
- Pier Francesco Mazzucchelli (1573–1626), Italian painter and draughtsman
- Pier Antonio Micheli (1679–1737), Italian botanist and Catholic priest
- Pier Francesco Mola (1612–1666), Italian painter
- Pier Francesco Orsini (1523–1583), Italian military leader and patron of the arts
- Pier Maria Pennacchi 1464–before 1515), Italian painter
- Pier Francesco Tosi (c.1653–1732), Italian castrato singer, composer, and writer on music
- Pier Paolo Vergerio the Elder (1370–1444 or 1445), Italian humanist, statesman and canon lawyer
- Pier Paolo Vergerio (c. 1498–1565), Italian religious reformer

== Later ==
- Pier Angeli (1932–1971), Italian actress
- Pier Luigi Bersani (born 1951), Italian politician
- Pier Paolo Bianchi (born 1952), Italian former Grand Prix motorcycle road racing world champion
- Pier Ferdinando Casini (born 1955), Italian politician
- Pier Giacomo Castiglioni (1913–1968), Italian architect and designer
- Pier Luigi Cherubino (born 1971), Spanish former footballer
- Pier Giorgio Frassati (1901–1925), Italian Catholic social activist canonised by the Catholic Church
- Pier Gonella (born 1977), Italian guitarist
- Pier Giacomo Grampa (born 1936), Italian bishop in Switzerland
- Pier Morten (born 1959), Canadian judoka and wrestler
- Pier Luigi Nervi (1891–1979), Italian engineer
- Pier Carlo Padoan (born 1950), Italian economist and Minister of Economy and Finances
- Pier Pander (1864–1919), Dutch sculptor and designer of medals
- Pier Antonio Panzeri (born 1955), Italian politician and MEP
- Pier Paolo Pasolini (1922–1975), Italian writer, film director and poet
- Pier Giorgio Perotto (1930–2002), Italian electrical engineer and inventor
- Pier Ruggero Piccio (1880–1965), Italian World War I flying ace and founding Chief of Staff of the Italian Air Force
- Pier Giacomo Pisoni (1928–1991), Italian historian, paleographer and archivist
- Pier Luigi Pizzi (born 1930), Italian opera director, set designer, and costume designer
- Pier Antonio Quarantotti Gambini (1910–1965), Italian writer and journalist
- Pier Andrea Saccardo (1845–1920), Italian botanist and mycologist
- Pier Vittorio Tondelli (1955–1991), Italian writer
- Pier Tol (born 1958), Dutch footballer
- Pier Vellinga (born 1950), Dutch climatologist

== See also ==
- Piers (name)
