= Charles Morgan (East India Company officer) =

- Born: 1744; Caernarfonshire
- Died: 21 March 1818 (aged 73–74); London
- Military career
- Allegiance: United Kingdom
- Branch: Bengal Army
- Service years: 1763–1799
- Rank: Lieutenant-general
- Commands: Commander-in-Chief, India

Lieutenant-General Charles Morgan (1744 – 21 March 1818) was an East India Company officer who served as Commander-in-Chief, India.

== Military career ==
Brought up in Caernarfon, the youngest son of Nathaniel Morgan of Warton Wythe Morgan was for many years a senior officer of the Bengal establishment. He officiated as Commander-in-Chief, India from 1797 to 1798 at the time that Zaman Shah threatened to invade the Northern Provinces.

He died at Portland Place in London in 1818. There is a monument dedicated to him in St John's Wood Church, near Lord's Cricket Ground, in London.

== Family ==
He married Hannah Wagstaff, eldest daughter of William Wagstaff of Manchester, an apothecary, and his wife Mary Taylor of Salford. Of their children, the best known is Elizabeth Georgiana, the youngest daughter, who in 1803 married Valentine Lawless, 2nd Baron Cloncurry. They had two children, but in 1811 her husband divorced her on the grounds of her adultery with Sir John Piers, 6th Baronet, following a particularly scandalous lawsuit for criminal conversation. She returned to live with her father for some years. After his death, she moved to Italy, where she remarried the Rev John Sandford, the absentee vicar of Nynehead, Somerset in 1819. By him, she had a daughter Anna, Lady Metheun. She died in 1857.

Military offices
| Preceded by Sir Robert Abercromby | Commander-in-Chief, India; 1797–1798 | Succeeded by Sir Alured Clarke |
