= Tristernagh Abbey =

Ruined Augustinian friary in Westmeath, Ireland

Coordinates: 53°35′56″N 7°28′46″W

- Mainistir Thriostarnaí
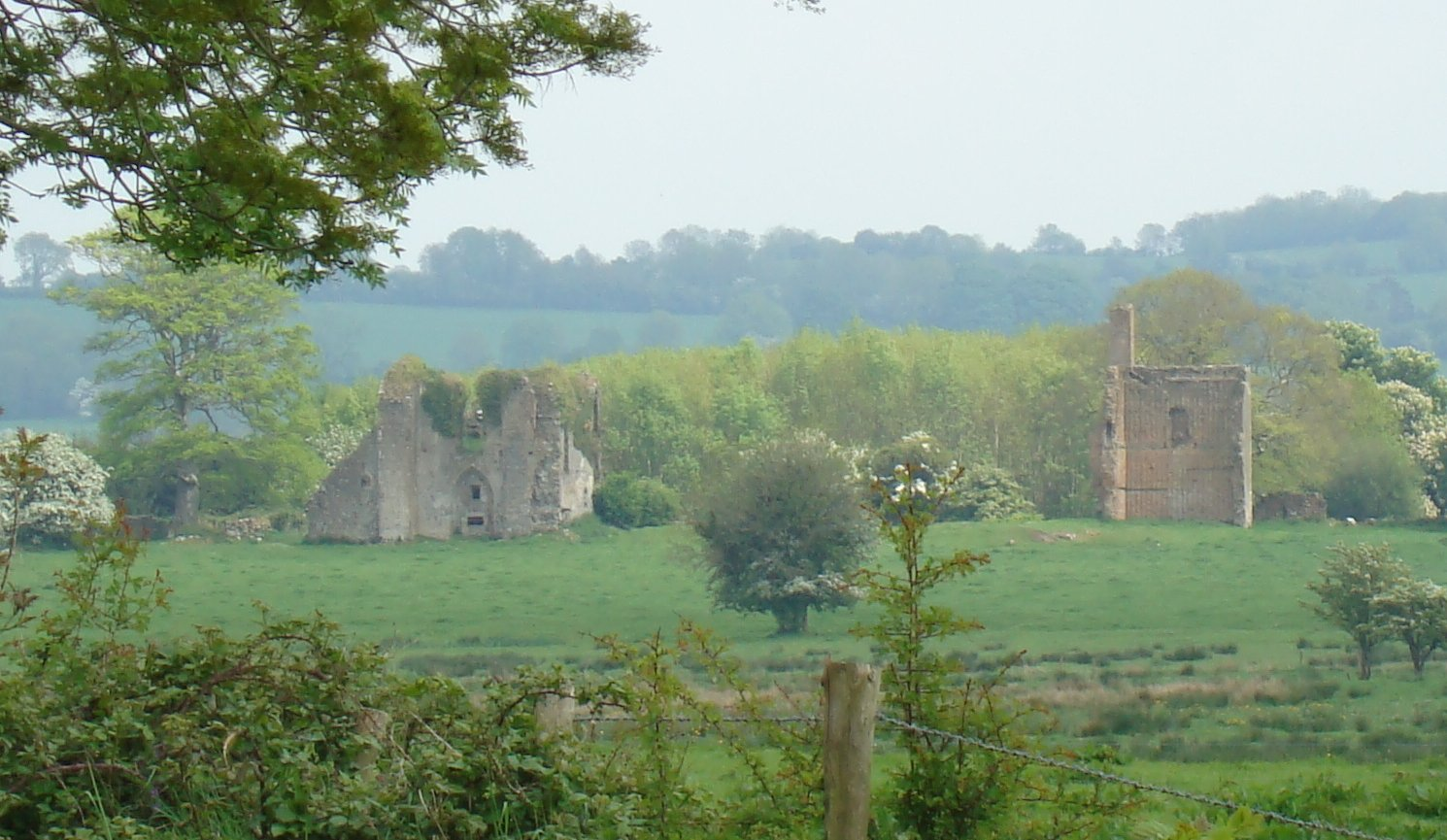
- The remaining ruins of Tristernagh Abbey (left), and part of the Georgian house built on the site (right).
- Interactive map of Tristernagh Abbey

Monastery information
- Order: Augustinian
- Established: c. 1190
- Disestablished: 30 November 1539
- Dedication: The Blessed Virgin Mary

People
- Founder: Geoffrey de Costentin

Tristernagh Abbey (Irish: Mainistir Thriostarnaí, IPA: ˈmˠanʲəʃtʲəɾʲˈhɾʲɪsˠt̪ˠəɾˠn̪ˠiː), also known as the Priory of Kilbixy or Kilbisky, Tristernagh Priory, or the priory of the Blessed Virgin Mary of Tristernagh, is a ruined Augustinian monastery in the townland of Tristernagh in the barony of Kilbixy in County Westmeath, Ireland. It is situated on the shores of Lough Iron, about 3 kilometres (1.9 mi) north east of the village of Ballynacargy.

The name "Tristernagh" comes from the Irish triostarnach, "place of thorns".

== History ==
The priory was founded in c. 1190 by Geoffrey de Costentin and was dedicated to Mary, mother of Jesus. Geoffrey, a Norman settler, had been granted the land by Walter de Lacy, Lord of Meath. There was already an important early church nearby at Kilbixy, dedicated to St Bigseach, which Geoffrey de Costentin subsequently granted to Ralph de Petit, the Archdeacon of Meath.

The first prior on record was named Henry, possibly a relative of the founder. Several of the Bishops of Ardagh and Meath were benefactors of the priory during its history. The final prior was Edmund Nugent, Bishop of Kilmore. In 1536 the abbey was ransacked by the commissioners of King Henry VIII and closed down; Nugent was pensioned off with a payment of £26 13s. 6d, with smaller pensions given to five canons, and the Abbey land was subsequently granted to William Piers by Elizabeth I. There was formerly a tradition in Kilbixy parish that at the time of the Reformation the Friars had removed the Abbey bells and thrown them into Lough Iron. The last prior willfully surrendered to crown forces on 30 November 1539.

=== Later history ===
According to a memorial inscription in the ruined church of Templecross nearby, the Abbey was repaired by William Piers' son Henry Piers, who converted to Catholicism in later life. It is also possible that the monastery was returned to religious use during the Confederate period, as there was a disagreement in 1646 between Thomas Dease and the Papal Nuncio Rinuccini over an appointment to it.

The ruins of the abbey were described as still very substantial in 1682 by their then-owner Sir Henry Piers, but were largely pulled down by one of his descendants, Sir Pigott Piers, in 1783 in an act later described, by topographer James Norris Brewer as "an outrage [...] the name of Tristernagh should never be mentioned without an expression of contempt [...] towards that of Sir Pigott William Piers". That year, Piers incorporated some of the demolished Abbey's building materials into a Gothic Revival house, Tristernagh House, which by the early 19th century was in a state of severe dilapidation and which was supposedly the inspiration for Maria Edgeworth's Castle Rackrent. Locally it was widely believed that the clearing of the old monastery graveyard in 1783 had brought ruin on the family. Piers' son had a new house constructed around half a kilometer to the north-west, and little now remains of either the abbey or the succeeding house on the site.

== O'Doherty's Bush ==
In the late 17th century a local tradition was recorded by Sir Henry Piers that a force of 600 men under O'Doherty, the Lord of Inishowen, had camped in the grounds of the Abbey before being defeated and mostly slain under its walls. It has been suggested that the story referred to Cahir O' Doherty's father Sir Shane O'Doherty, who is known to have been sent to the area from the army of Hugh Roe O'Donnell subsequent to the Battle of Curlew Pass in 1599. A thornbush (still in existence in 1837) and hillock in Tristernagh Demesne were pointed out by locals as the site of O'Doherty's encampment; and "O'Doherty's Bush" was shown on the 19th century Ordnance Survey sheet for Kilbixy parish.

== Baronetcy ==
The Piers Baronets, of Tristernagh Abbey is an extant peerage in the Baronetage of Ireland.

== See also ==
- List of abbeys and priories in Ireland (County Westmeath)
- Kilbixy (civil parish)
