= James Ware (historian) =

Irish historian (1594-1666)

Sir James Ware
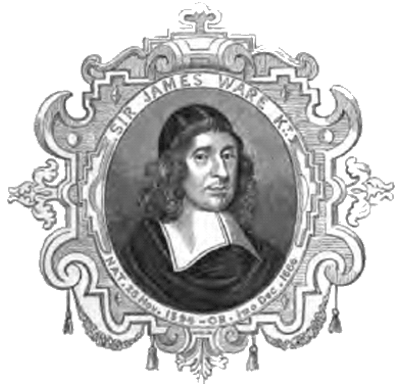

Member of Parliament for Dublin University
- In office 1661–1666 – 1634–1641

Privy Council of Ireland
- In office 1660–1666

Auditor General
- In office 1660–1666

Personal details
- Born: 26 November 1594 Dublin, Ireland
- Died: 1 December 1666 (aged 72) Dublin, Ireland
- Resting place: St Werburgh's Church, Dublin
- Spouse: Elizabeth Newman
- Parents: Sir James Ware (1568–1632) (father); Mary Briden (mother)
- Education: Trinity College Dublin
- Known for: historian

Sir James Ware (26 November 1594 – 1 December 1666) was an Anglo-Irish historian.

== Personal details ==
Born at Castle Street, Dublin on 26 November 1594, James Ware was the eldest son of Sir James Ware (1568–1632) and Mary Bryden, daughter of Ambrose Bryden of Bury St. Edmunds. Originally from Yorkshire, his father came to Ireland in 1588 as secretary to the Lord Deputy of Ireland, Sir William FitzWilliam, was knighted by James I, elected to the Irish House of Commons for Mallow in 1613, and served as auditor of Trinity College Dublin He also had a younger brother Joseph, Dean of Elphin from 1642 to 1648, while his sister Martha married Sir William Piers and was the mother of Sir Henry Piers, 1st Baronet, who shared his uncle's antiquarian interests.

In 1620, he married Elizabeth Newman, and they had ten children together, only two of whom outlived their father, his eldest son James (1622–1689) and the fifth, Robert (1639–1696). The others included Roger (1624–1642), Mary (1625–1651), Rose (1627–1649), who married Richard Lambart, 2nd Earl of Cavan ("the mad Earl"), Elizabeth (1629–1649), John (1631–1650), Ann (1633–1650), Arthur (1637–1640) and Joseph (1643–1644).

== Career ==
Ware entered Trinity College Dublin in October 1611, where he became interested in Irish history and began assembling a collection of Irish manuscripts. He also made transcriptions from works held in other collections, including that of his close friend James Ussher (1581–1656), Primate of Ireland from 1625 to 1656. During the early 1620s, he assisted his father in collating the findings of the 1622 Royal Commission, which provided a critical appraisal of the state of affairs in Ireland. His work caught the attention of Richard Boyle, 1st Earl of Cork, who employed him to research his own family history, part of Cork's dynastic ambitions to place the Boyles on the same level as some of the more established families in Ireland.

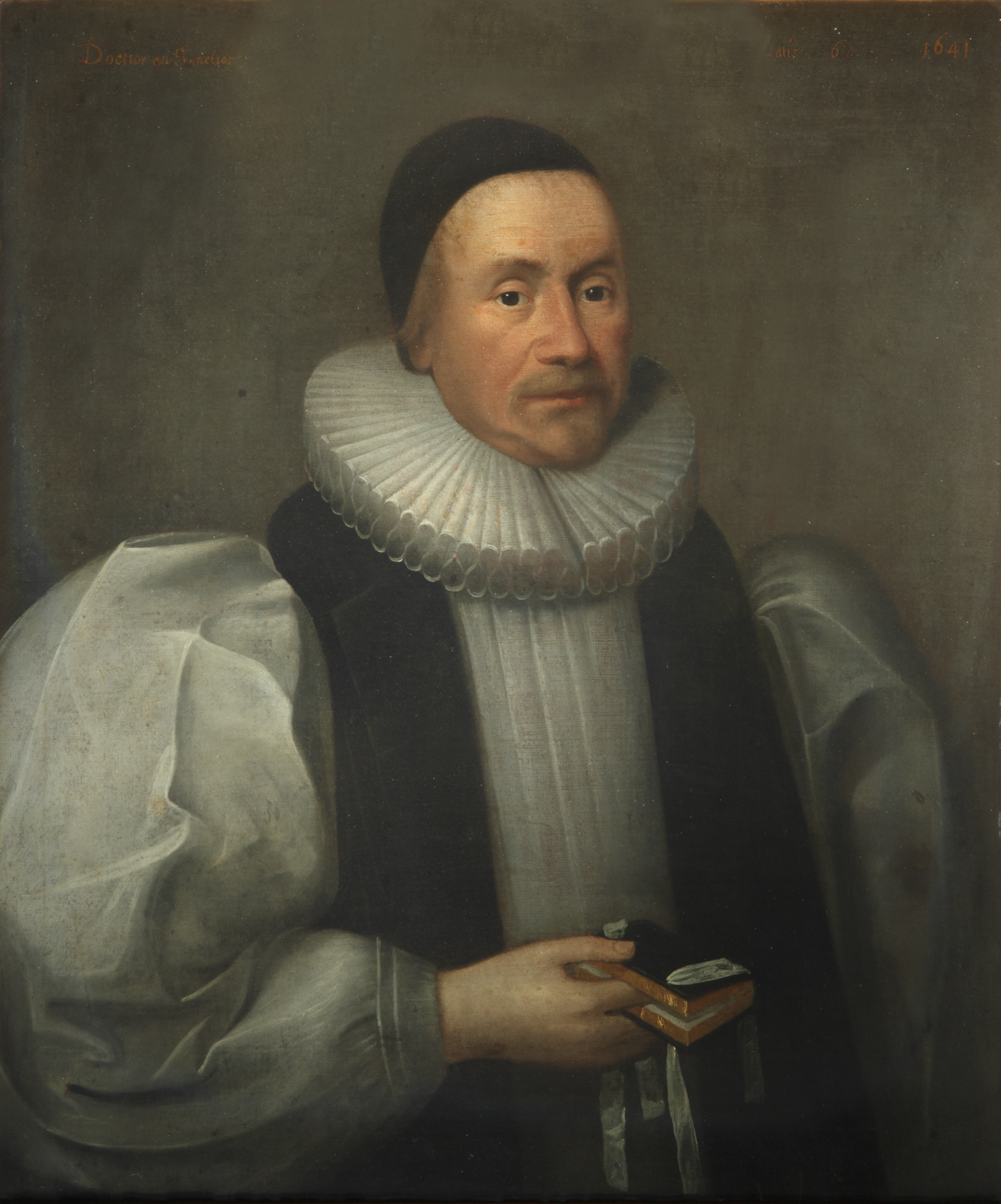
Ware's close friend and fellow scholar, James Ussher (1581–1656), Primate of Ireland from 1625 to 1656

His experience with the Commission meant that in 1629, he was commissioned by Lords Justices Cork and Adam Loftus, 1st Viscount Loftus to attend Charles I in London to discuss the financial crisis facing the Irish government. The success of this visit resulted in his knighthood in Christ Church Cathedral, Dublin on 28 February 1630, and he inherited the post of Auditor General when his father died in 1632.

Following the appointment of Sir Thomas Wentworth, 1st Earl of Strafford as Lord Deputy of Ireland, Ware's political fortunes continued on an upward curve. He was elected Member of Parliament for Dublin University in 1634 thanks to Wentworth's endorsement. He accompanied the lord deputy to Connacht as part of the government's attempts to extend its policy regarding plantations of Ireland. His knowledge and ownership of medieval Irish manuscripts was central in this regard, where he brought with him Irish annals to enable Wentworth to prove royal claims to land in Connacht. In 1638, he obtained, with Sir Philip Perceval, the monopoly of granting licenses for the sale of ale and brandy, a lucrative deal that was no doubt a reward for his efforts in making the Irish administration more efficient.

One of the few English government officials who earned Wentworth's respect, in September 1640, he was elevated to the Irish Privy Council and also elected to the Parliament of Ireland. When Wentworth was impeached by the Parliament of England and subsequently executed in May 1641, he managed to avoid prosecution of his close associates, which included John Bramhall, bishop of Derry, Sir George Radcliffe, Lord Chancellor Richard Bolton and Gerard Lowther, Chief Justice of the Irish Common Pleas.

Assessing Ware's political conduct under the dichotomous governments of Lords Justice Loftus and Cork (1629–1632) and Lord Deputy Wentworth (1632–1641) is not necessarily straightforward. But ultimately, he was a royalist in the truest sense in that he did not necessarily share the same political views, or at least approve of Wentworth's style of governing (especially in regard to reforms for the Church of Ireland). Nevertheless, he was prepared to follow instructions if it meant benefiting the king's interest in Ireland.

== The Crisis of the 1640s and Exile ==
Ware remained firm to the royalist cause during the Irish Confederate Wars, which were part of the conflict known as the Wars of the Three Kingdoms, consuming much of Ireland and Britain during the 1640s. He was a strong supporter of James Butler, 1st Duke of Ormonde. In 1644, he was sent to Oxford to advise Charles I of developments in Ireland. In his free time, he studied in the Bodleian Library and was awarded a doctor of civil law from the University of Oxford in recognition of his scholarly achievements. While travelling back to Ireland in January 1646, he was captured by Parliamentarian forces and imprisoned in the Tower of London until October, when he was released and returned to Dublin. However, when Ormond surrendered the city to the new Parliamentarian governor Colonel Michael Jones in June 1647, Ware and Richard Ormond were sent to England as hostages to ensure compliance with the terms.

Ware was expelled in 1649 on account of his royalist sympathies and the threat he posed to the Cromwellian regime in Ireland. He departed Ireland in April 1649, staying primarily at the Protestant stronghold of Caen, where Ormonde's influential wife, Elizabeth Butler, was living with her family. In October 1650, Ware obtained a licence to move to London, thanks to the intervention of Ussher, on condition that he refrained from engaging in politics. He would stay in the English capital until at least 1658, during which time he revived scholarly research and established intimate friendships with many of the leading English historians and antiquarians such as John Selden, Sir William Dugdale, and Sir Roger Twysden.

== Restoration ==
The 1660 Stuart Restoration saw Ware resume his position as auditor general, which had been stripped from him by the Cromwellian regime. He was re-elected as MP for the University of Dublin at the Irish parliament of 1661–1666 and continued to be an active member of the privy council. More significantly, he was appointed one of the commissioners for the Irish land settlement – a lucrative position and reward for his unwavering loyalty to the Crown and Ormond during the 1640s. He remained on close terms with the duke, who frequently visited him for consultations at his home in Castle Street. He died there on 1 December 1666, aged seventy-two, and was buried in St Werburgh's Church, Dublin. In 1879 the curate, Rev. J. H. McMahon, sought to solicit subscriptions to erect a mural table by way of paying tribute to "Ware’s vast merits as a reliable writer of Irish history, and as a real credit to Ireland, and to Dublin, his native city". Though McMahon's attempts proved futile, it nevertheless served as a reminder of Ware's enduring legacy and esteem with which he was held two hundred years later.

== Legacy ==
His son Robert struggled with epilepsy in his youth but showed a keen interest in history and sought to emulate his father, who bequeathed him his valuable manuscripts, to which Robert added forgeries in the blank pages. Using his father's reputation to enhance his own, he recorded "imaginary conversations and plots, unhappily bedevilling sixteenth-century Irish ecclesiastical history for over 300 years". The sectarian insertions left a partial stain on Sir James Ware's reputation – whose research deliberately refrained from making highly sensitive religious comments – and the forgeries were not discovered for another two hundred years, when, in the late nineteenth century, Thomas E. Bridgett revealed irregularities in Sir James Ware's manuscripts.

Robert was not alone in distorting Sir James Ware's research for political and religious gain. Walter Harris, who married Robert's granddaughter, also used Ware's work for anti-Catholic purposes. His translation of Ware's works in 1739 entitled, The Whole Works of James Ware Concerning Ireland revised and Improved, "sought to resume Ussher's discussion of the antiquity of the Church of Ireland by imposing upon Ware's comparatively innocuous text the appearance of a study of Protestant lineage among its author's civilised antiquity". Harris's alterations were significant. "Just as Robert deceived his readers by claiming his forgeries were genuine because they came from his father’s manuscripts, Harris misled his audience by including material that had no connection with James’ investigations."

In 1686, Robert sold his father's manuscripts to Henry Hyde, 2nd Earl of Clarendon, who then passed them on to James Brydges, 1st Duke of Chandos (1674–1744). Repeated attempts were made to purchase Ware's prized manuscripts, notably by Archbishop William King of Dublin and the famous satirist Jonathan Swift, Dean of St Patrick's Cathedral Dublin. However, they were unsuccessful. Though the manuscripts were later sold and dispersed, a large part of Ware's collection was fortunately preserved. Following an auction of Chandos's library in 1747, several of Ware's manuscripts were purchased by Richard Rawlinson, who subsequently deposited them in the Bodleian Library in 1755. Another large collection was donated to the British Museum (now British Library) in 1765 thanks to Jeremiah Milles, Dean of Exeter, who was executor for his cousin, the noted manuscript collector and Bishop of Ossory, Richard Pococke.

== Bibliography ==
=== Ecclesiastical Works ===
Ware's first book, published in 1626, was Archiepiscoporum Cassiliensium & Tuamensium Vitae, an impressive introduction into historical research which traced the archbishop of Cashel and Tuam from the twelfth to seventeenth century. To this, he appended a catalogue of the Cistercian abbeys in Ireland that had been founded between 1139 and 1260. This was followed by De Praesulibus Lageniae in 1628. A well-informed and more detailed study, Ware's analysis of the bishops of Leinster included a thorough analysis of the prelates of Dublin, Kildare, Ferns, Leighlin, and Ossory. The episcopal catalogues were a remarkable achievement not only because they shed important light on Ireland's rich history but also because he fused Irish medieval manuscripts and state records to produce a reliable and detailed work. Among the notable sources he consulted for his work on the Leinster bishops included the Annals of Ulster, Annals of Connacht, Annals of John Clyn and Red Book of Ossory (to name but a few).

=== Secular Works ===
In 1633, he published one of his most famous works: The Historie of Ireland, collected by three learned authors. This included Edmund Campion's 'Historie of Ireland', Meredith Hanmer's 'Chronicle of Ireland' and, notably, the controversial tract by Edmund Spenser, 'A View of the State of Ireland'. Contrary to what the title claimed, Ware also included the short work of the fifteenth-century chronicler, Henry Marlborough, whose 'Chronicle of Ireland' began in 1285 and thus suitably complemented Hanmer's work, which ended in 1284. The work has received widespread attention from Irish historians for Ware's subtle editing of Spenser's political writings as well as its dedication to Lord Deputy Wentworth. His attempts to tone the text down was, as he admitted, an attempt to reflect the more peaceful times of the 1630s. At the same time it is hard to see the inclusion of the 'View' as nothing more than a reflection of political and colonial ambitions of the new government under Wentworth.

Ware's fourth work was arguably his best to date. De Scriptoribus Hiberniae, published in Dublin in 1639, was an exhaustive account of the writers of Ireland from the fourth to the seventeenth century. It was divided into two books: the first considered Irish authors, while the second provided information on 'foreign' writers commenting on Ireland. Rich in source material, one of the most striking features was Ware's ability to interconnect medieval Irish manuscripts with European printed works. The turmoil of the civil war in the 1640s, and his senior role under the government of James Butler meant it was to be his last published work for fifteen years.

Ware's first new book since the 1630s was De Hibernia et Antiquitatibus eius Disquisitones, published in London in 1654, and in a second edition in 1658. This was followed in 1656 by Opuscula Sancto Patricio Adscripta. The year 1664 saw the publication of Venerabilis Bedae Epistolae Duae and Rerum Hibernicarum Annales ab Anno Domini 1485 ad Annum 1558. In the following year, which saw the publication of De Praesulibus Hiberniae Commentarius, he began a brief though fruitful collaboration with Dubhaltach MacFhirbhisigh. It was later stated that "He always kept in his House an Irish Amanuensis to interpret and translate the Language for him, and at the Time of his Death one Dubley Firbisse served him in that Office."

== Sources ==
- Barnard, Toby (2008). Improving Ireland? Projectors, prophets and profiteers, 1641–1786. Dublin: Four Courts Press. ISBN 978-1-84682-055-7.
- Bridgett, Thomas E. (1891). "Robert Ware: Or, A rogue and his dupes". Blunders and Forgeries: Historical Essays. K. Paul, Trench, Trübner.
- Empey, Mark (2016). "A real credit to Ireland, and to Dublin: the scholarly achievements of Sir James Ware". In Miller, Kathleen; Gribben, Crawford (eds.). Dublin: Renaissance city of literature. Manchester University Press. ISBN 978-1526113269.
- Empey, Mark (2017). "Creating a usable past: James and Robert Ware". In Ford, Alan; Moffitt, Miriam; Empey, Mark (eds.). The Church of Ireland and its Past: History, Interpretation and Identity. Four Courts Press. ISBN 978-1846826375.
- Empey, Mark (2014). "The diary of Sir James Ware, 1623–66". Analecta Hibernica (45): 53–146. JSTOR 24589227.
- Ford, Alan (2007). James Ussher: Theology, History, and Politics in early-modern Ireland and England. Oxford: Oxford University Press.
- Ford, Alan (2005). "The Irish historical renaissance and the shaping of Protestant history". In McCafferty, John; Ford, Alan (eds.). The Origins of Sectarianism in Early Modern Ireland. Cambridge University Press.
- Hadfield, Andrew; Maley, Willy (1997). Edmund Spenser; A View of the State of Ireland. From the first printed edition (1633). Oxford University Press. ISBN 978-0631205340.
- Kelly, James; Lyons, Mary Ann (2014). The Proclamations of Ireland 1660–1820, Volume 1: Charles II, 1660–85. Dublin: Irish Manuscripts Commission. ISBN 9781906865184.
- Little, Patrick (2002). "The Geraldine ambitions of the first earl of Cork". Irish Historical Studies. 33 (130): 151–168. doi:10.1017/S0021121400015662. S2CID 163196737.
- MacCulloch, Diarmaid (2011). "Foxes, Firebrands, and Forgery: Robert Ware's Pollution of Reformation History". The Historical Journal. 54 (2): 307–346. doi:10.1017/S0018246X10000580. S2CID 162649706.
- Magennis, Eoin (1998). "A "beleaguered Protestant"? Walter Harris and the writing of Fiction unmasked". Eighteenth-Century Ireland. 12: 86–111. doi:10.3828/eci.1998.8. S2CID 256129781.
- Mahaffy, John Pentland (1903). An Epoch in Irish History: Trinity College Dublin: Its Foundation and Early Fortunes, 1591–1660. T Fisher Unwin.
- Meehan, Rev. Charles Patrick (2015) [1846]. The Confederation of Kilkenny. FB&C Ltd. ISBN 978-1331351603.
- O'Sullivan, William (1997). "A finding list of Sir James Ware's manuscripts". Proceedings of the Royal Irish Academy, Section C. 97 (2): 73. JSTOR 25516189.
- Treadwell, Victor (2006). The Irish Commission of 1622: An Investigation of the Irish Administration, 1615–1622, and Its Consequences, 1623–1624. Dublin: Irish Manuscripts Commission. ISBN 978-1-874-280-637.
- Williams, Mark (2010). "History, the Interregnum and the Exiled Irish". In Forest, Stephen Paul (ed.). Constructing the Past: Writing Irish History, 1600–1800. Boydell & Brewer. ISBN 9781843835738.
