= Clonmacnoise Crucifixion Plaque =

10th- or 11th-century Irish sculpture

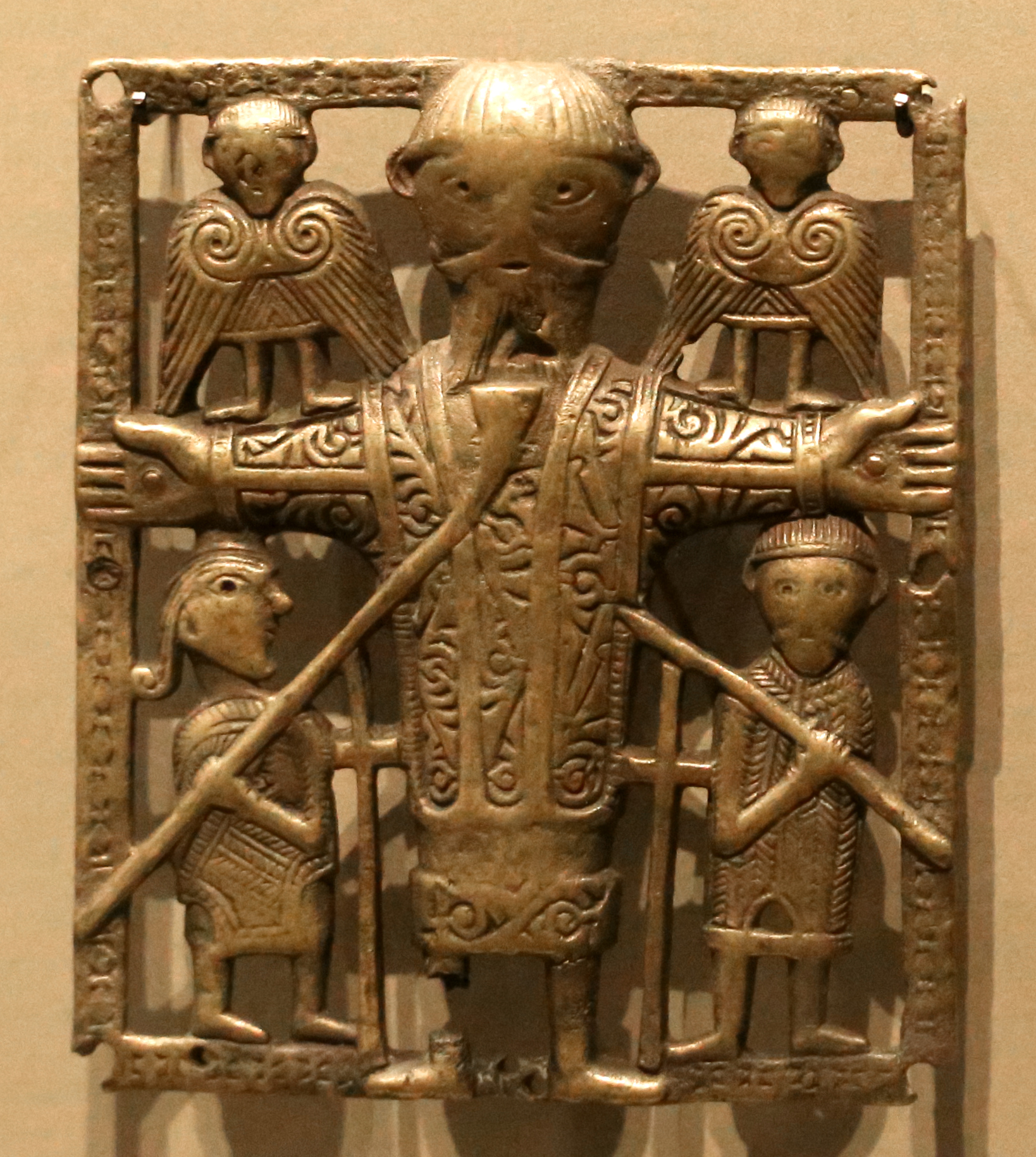
- Material: Bronze, gilt openwork, repoussé
- Size: Height: 8.0 cm (3.1 in) Width: 7.3 cm (2.9 in)
- Created: 10th century
- Period/culture: Early Medieval, Insular
- Place: Clonmacnoise monastery, County Offaly, Ireland
- Present location: National Museum of Ireland

The Clonmacnoise Crucifixion Plaque is a 10th century Irish gilt-bronze sculpture showing a disproportionately large, crucificified but still alive Christ, surrounded by two attendant angels in the upper quadrants and the Roman soldiers Stephaton (the sponge-bearer) and Longinus (the lance-bearer) in the lower quadrants.

The sculpture is 8.0 cm (3.1 in) in height and one of eight exant early medieval Irish crucifixion plaques, which after representations on high crosses, are the earliest surviving Irish representations of the Crucifixion. It's closely observed detail, especially around the figure's clothing, was described by the art historian Máire de Paor as the "most charming of the series". Its modern rediscovery and provenance is unknown. It was acquired by the National Museum of Ireland in 1935 and is on permanent display.

== Description ==
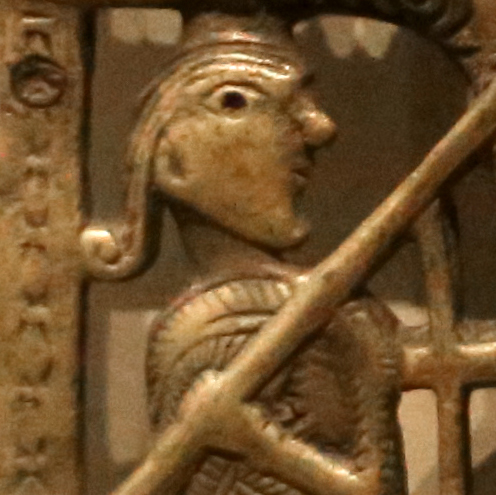
Detail of Stephaton

The Clonmacnoise Crucifixion Plaque is made from gilt-bronze and is hollow-cast (ie liquid bronze was poured into a mold). The outline of the figures was achieved via openwork, that is, by creating holes or gaps in the metal to produce the shapes. The frame is almost square with an outermost height of 8.0 cm (3.1 in) and width of 7.3 cm (2.9 in). The frame is decorated by a series of lozenges (diamond or rhombus-shaped patterns) separated by horizontal bars.

As with each of the eight surviving Crucifixion plaque, here Christ is depicted with open eyes, indicating that he is still alive. As is typical for the group, his head and outstretched arms are disproportionally large compared to the rest of his body. He wears an adorned chasuble (a liturgical vestment) that reaches to his knee and is divided laterally into three highly decorated vertical segments, under which is an elaborately decorated hem. He has rather stubby legs.

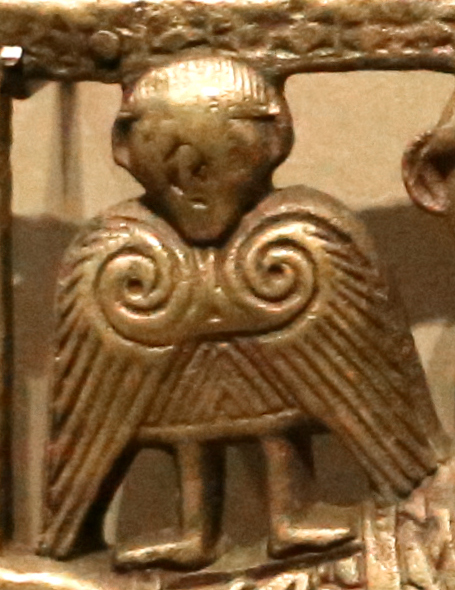
The angel on the left upper quadrant

Christ's arms are in low relief and adorned with bilateral patterns. He is smiling despite the nial wounds in his palms and chest, the latter of which are inflicted from spears thrust by the biblical soldier Stephaton (in the lower left quadrant) and Longinus (in the lower right quadrant). The angels standing on his arms have diagonally hatched wings that coil inwards to resolve in a pair of large spirals. Like Christ, the angel's feet turn outwards. These figures are in poorer condition than the central figure. on the lower left quadrant, Stephaton is shown in profile with feet turned towards Christ while stabbing him with a long spear. Stephaton wears a long garment, possibly of chain mail, and decorated with herringbone patterns. He is given a face with a short nose, a protruding chin, and a gaping mouth.

The figures are surrounded by a continuous rectangular frame on which Jesus, Stephaton and Longinus stand on its lower border. Because Christ is much larger than the frame, the cross is not visible.

== Function ==
Archaeologists believe that it was built as an attachment to a larger metal or wooden object, given that the reverse is flat and unadorned, and that it contains eight rivet-holes (only one rivet –or nail– remains) on the outer borders. It is unknown as to what the precise intention was; the plaques may have adorned book covers, crosses or altar frontals.

== Dating ==
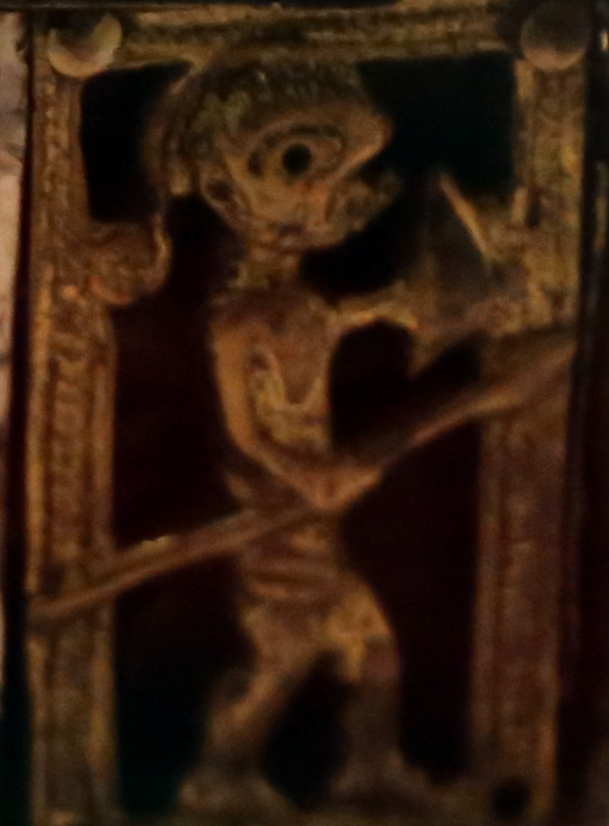
Detail of figures from the cumdach of the Stowe Missal

Archaeologists date the plaque to the mid-10th century as it shares several motifs with other objects securely dated to that period. In particular, it contains elements of the Viking Ringerike style. In addition, the representations of Stephaton and Longinus bear similarities to figures on the borders of the cumdach—a metal casing intended as a book shrine—built for the Stowe Missal and dated to c. 1045–1052. A warrior on one side of the Stowe cumdach holds a lance that merges into the left and right sides of the frame, as do both soldiers on the Clonmacnoise plaque. The Stowe warrior's hair curves in a distinctive manner around the back of his neck before merging with the frame, a visual motif near identical to the depiction of Stephaton in the Clonmacnoise plaque.

The art historian Peter Harbison grouped the plaque with a now lost example rediscovered in County Mayo, known only from a 19th-century drawing in watercolour, and suggested a single workshop based in the major artistic center at Clonmacnoise monastery.

Crists's depiction resembles an earlier Manks stone cross found on the Calf of Man island off the southwest coast of the Isle of Man. In that work, he also wears a moustache, forked beard and long hair, but is more similar (and closer in date) to Christ in the Rinnegan plaque, while bearing a resemblance to the cleric on the side panel of the 11th-century imagery added to the Soiscél Molaisse cumdach.

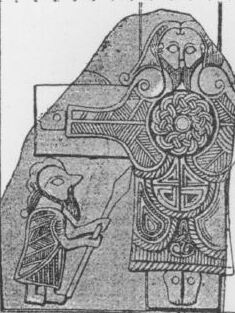
19th century drawing of the Calf of Man stone cross.

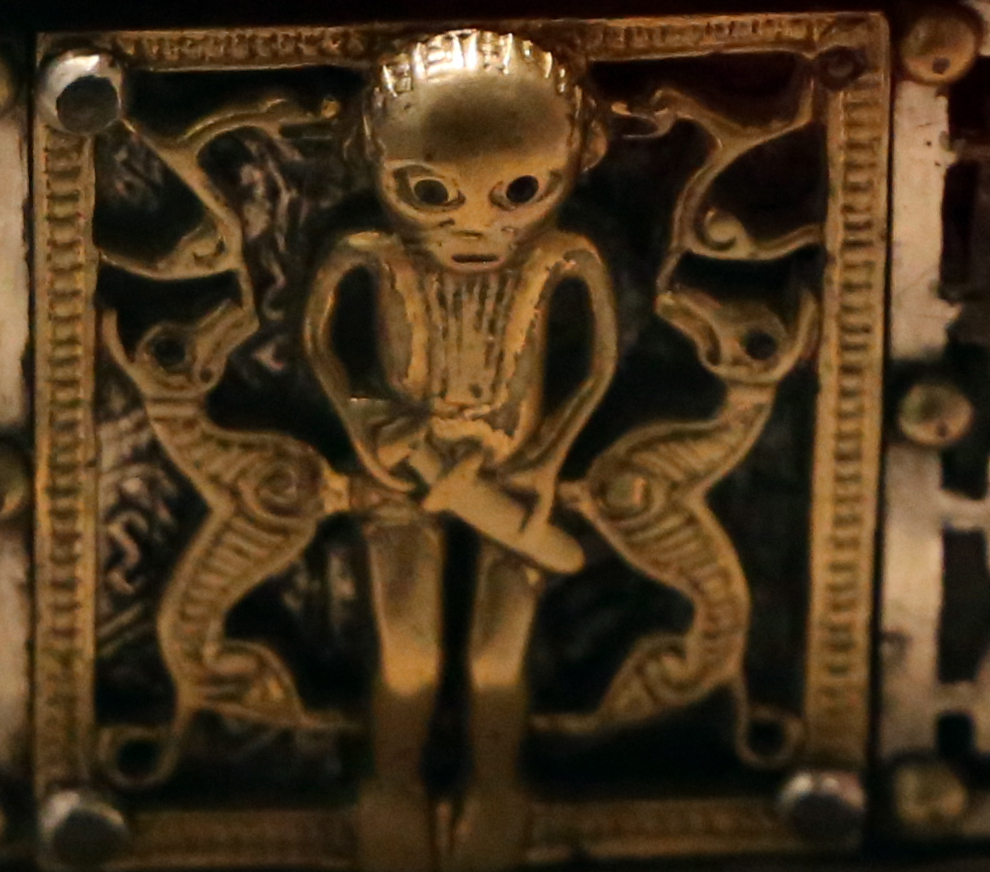
Detail from the Stowe Missal cumdach, mid-11th century

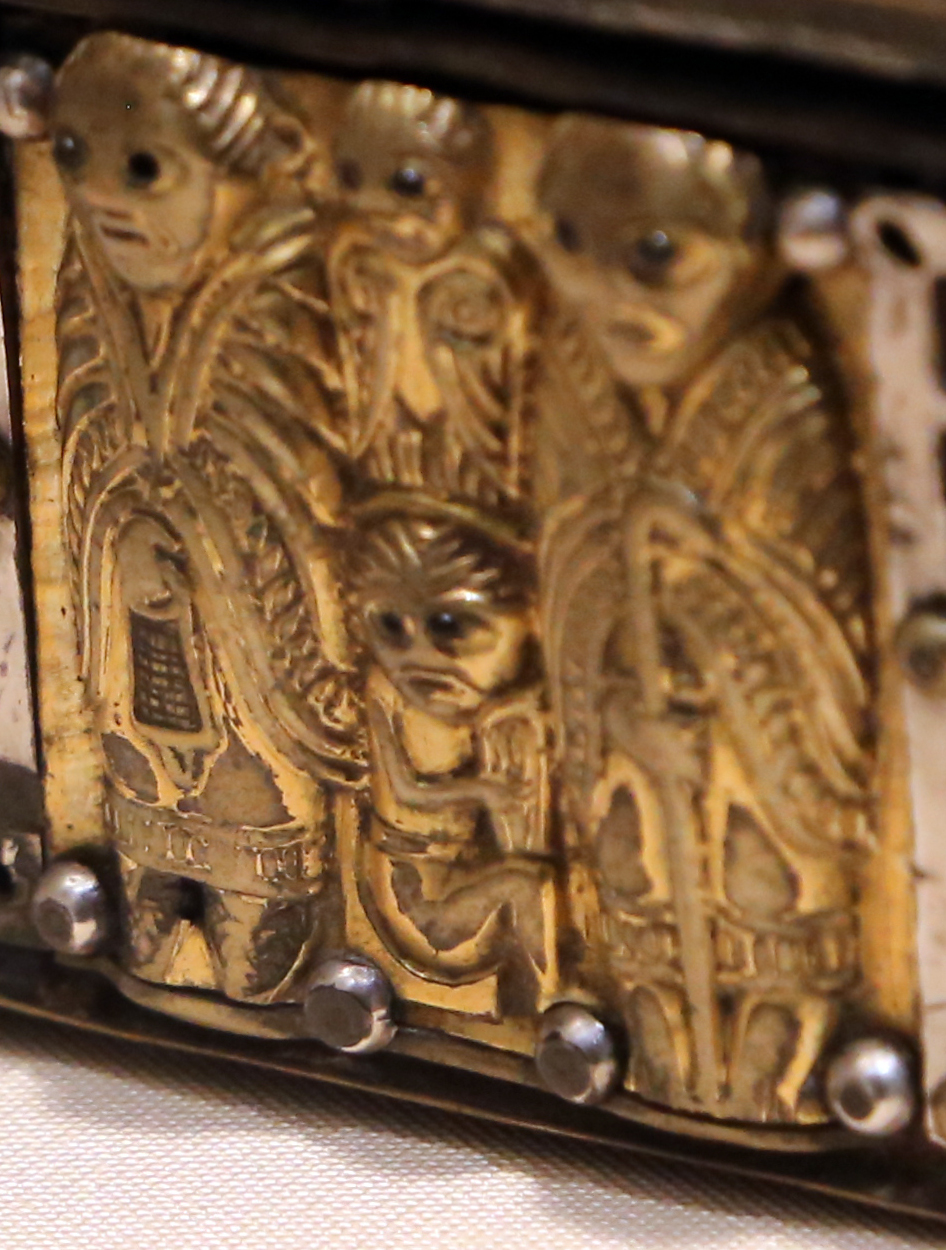
Detail from the Stowe Missal

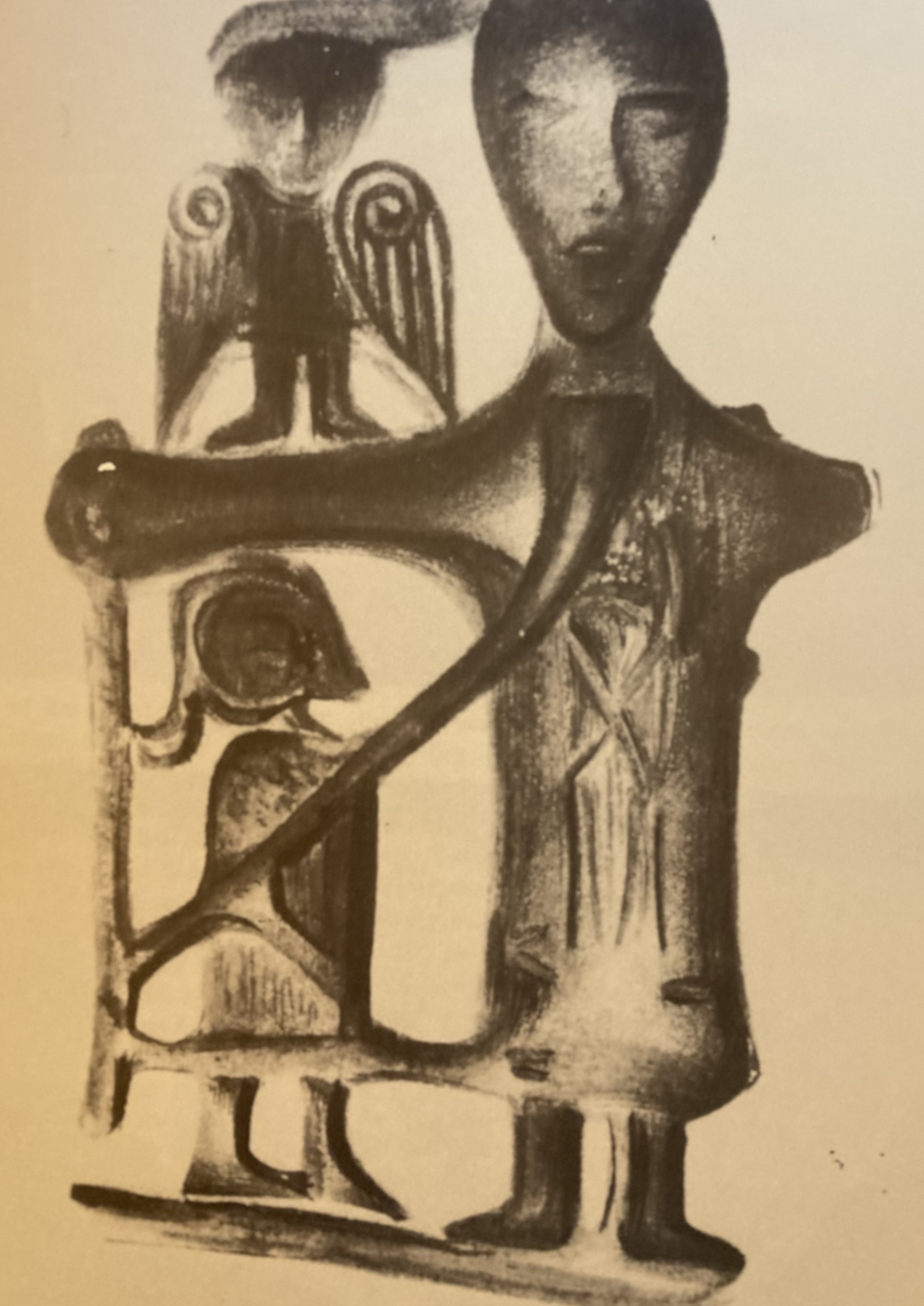
Watercolour of a fragment of the lost Mayo Crucifixion Plaque. 1830s. Assumed height: 8.5 cm (3.3 in)

== Sources ==
- Johnson, Ruth. "Irish Crucifixion Plaques: Viking Age or Romanesque?". The Journal of the Royal Society of Antiquaries of Ireland, volume 128, 1998. JSTOR 25549845
- Harbison, Peter. The Crucifixion in Irish Art. Columba Press, 2000. ISBN 978-1-8560-7278-6
- Harbison, Peter. "A lost crucifixion plaque of Clonmacnoise type found in County Mayo". ̄Irish Midland Studies: Essays in Commemoration of N.W. English. Athlone, 1980. ISBN 0-9503-4281-5
- Mitchell, G. Frank. "Foreign Influences and the Beginnings of Christian Art". In: Treasures of early Irish art, 1500 B.C. to 1500 A.D: From the collections of the National Museum of Ireland, Royal Irish Academy, Trinity College Dublin. NY: Metropolitan Museum of Art, 1977. ISBN 978-0-8709-9164-6
- Moss, Rachel. Medieval c. 400—c. 1600: Art and Architecture of Ireland. London: Yale University Press, 2014. ISBN 978-0-3001-7919-4
- Murray, Griffin. "Irish crucifixion plaques: a reassessment. In: Mullins, Juliet; Ni Ghradaigh, Jenifer (eds): Envisioning Christ on the Cross: Ireland and the Early Medieval West. University of Notre Dame: Thomas F.X. Noble, 2014
- de Paor, Máire. "An Openwork Crucifixion Plaque from Clonmacnoise". The Journal of the Royal Society of Antiquaries of Ireland, volume 84, no. 1, 1954. JSTOR 25509155
