= Piers baronets =

Baronetcy in the Baronetage of Ireland

There have been two baronetcies created for persons with the surname Piers, one in the Baronetage of Nova Scotia, now extinct, and one in the Baronetage of Ireland, extant as of 2018.

The Piers Baronetcy, of Stonepit in the County of Kent, was created in the Baronetage of Nova Scotia on 24 March 1638 for Thomas Piers. The title became dormant on the death of the third Baronet in 1720.

The Piers Baronetcy, of Tristernagh Abbey in the County of Westmeath, was created in the Baronetage of Ireland on 18 February 1661 for Sir Henry Piers, 1st Baronet. He was a descendant of William Piers, originally of Piers Hall, Yorkshire, who received a grant of Tristernagh Abbey, County Westmeath, by Elizabeth I in the late 1560s, and served as Governor of Carrickfergus and Seneschal of County Antrim. The sixth baronet, Sir John Bennett Piers, was involved in a notorious lawsuit in 1807 when he was found to have seduced Lady Cloncurry, the wife of a close friend.

== Piers baronets, of Stonepit (1638) ==
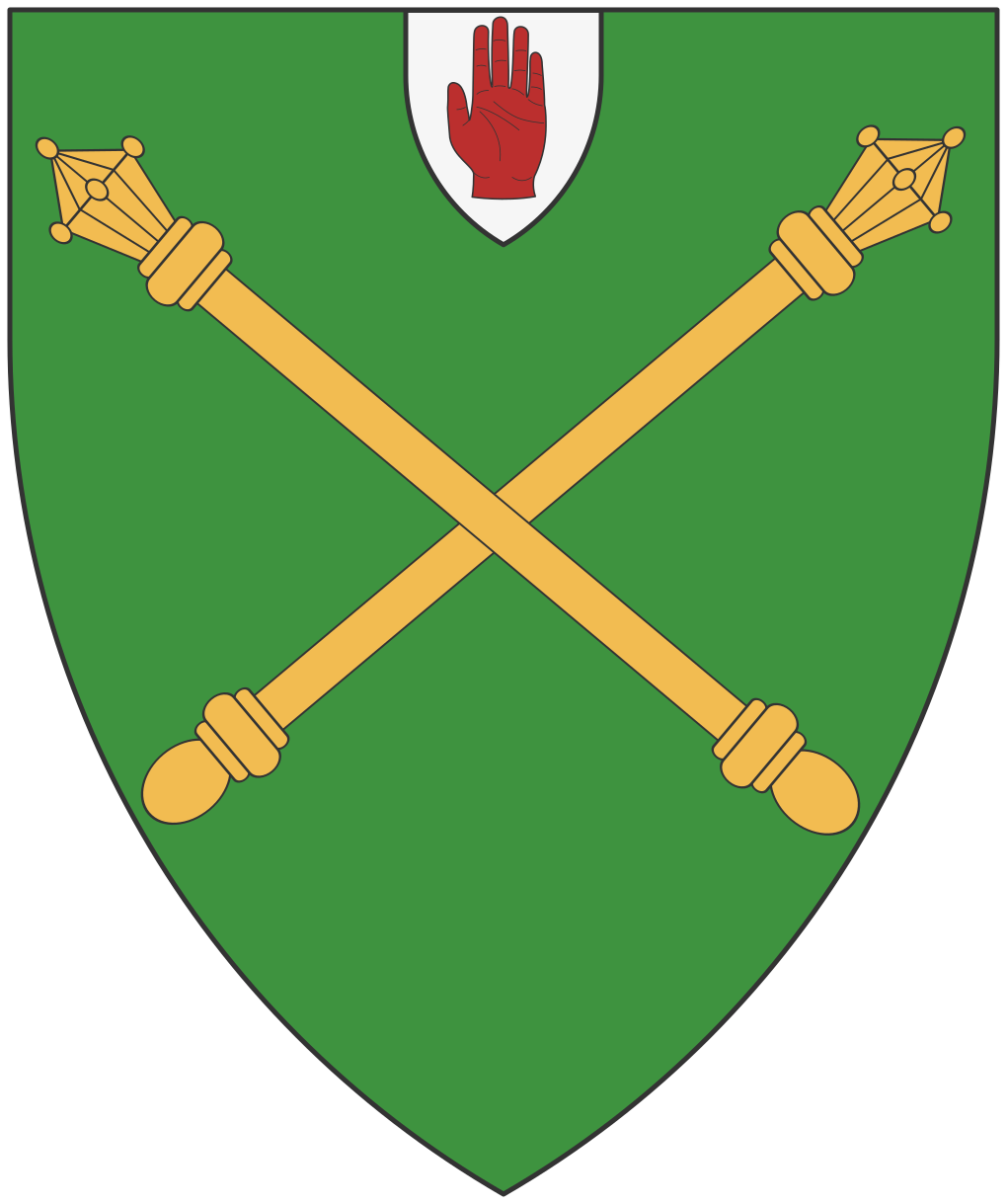
The coat of arms of the Piers of Stonepit, Baronets.

- Sir Thomas Piers, 1st Baronet (c. 1616–1680)
- Sir Thomas Piers, 2nd Baronet (c. 1643–1693)
- Sir George Piers, 3rd Baronet (1670–1720)

== Piers baronets, of Tristernagh Abbey (1661) ==
Escutcheon of the Piers baronets of Tristernagh Abbey

- Sir Henry Piers, 1st Baronet (c. 1628–1691)
- Sir William Piers, 2nd Baronet (c. 1653–1693)
- Sir Henry Piers, 3rd Baronet (1678–1733)
- Sir John Piers, 4th Baronet (died 1747)
- Sir Pigott William Piers, 5th Baronet (c. 1742–1798)
- Sir John Bennett Piers, 6th Baronet (c. 1775–1845 )
- Sir Henry Samuel Piers, 7th Baronet (1811–1850)
- Sir Eustace Fitz-Maurice Piers, 8th Baronet (1840–1913)
- Sir Charles Pigott Piers, 9th Baronet (1870–1945)
- Sir Charles Robert Fitzmaurice Piers, 10th Baronet (1903–1996)
- Sir James Desmond Piers, 11th Baronet (born 1947)
