= William Piers (constable) =

English constable (c. 1510 – 1603)

- Born: c. 1510; York, England
- Died: 1603
- Burial place: Carrickfergus, Northern Ireland
- Military career
- Allegiance: England
- Rank: Captain

William Piers (c. 1510 – 1603) was an English constable, who spent most of his life in Ireland. He was the first mayor and practical founder of Carrickfergus. He was noted in particular for his attempts to drive out the Scots from Ulster and the great lengths that he went to in attempting to enhance the power of local chiefs at the expense of the Scots. Granted Tristernagh Abbey as a reward for his military services, he made it into his family home from the late 1560s until his death in 1603.

== Early life ==
He came from a family whose seat was in Piers Hall near Ingleton in the county of York. He was the son of Richard Piers; his paternal grandfather was John Piers; his paternal great-grandfather was Gerald Piers. Nothing is known about his education.

He was described by a deposition in the high court of admiralty, dated 27 November 1555, as 'a tall burly man with a big, brown beard' who was captain of a ship given to him by James Fitzgerald, 13th Earl of Desmond.

== Career ==
Piers was recruited by the acting governor of Ireland, Thomas Radcliffe, Lord Fitzwalter, to participate in a naval expedition against the Scots in the North Channel and the Hebrides.

Piers and his partners in the enterprise were also contracted to carry out fishing in the River Bann, though this may have merely been a pretext for establishing a naval presence there. In the spring of 1558, Piers participated in a second maritime attack on the MacDonalds who were emigrating to Ulster.

In 1562, however, he developed diplomatic relations with James MacDonald after travelling to Kintyre to meet with him, but although he remained in contact with the MacDonalds for several years he would soon do all he could to limit the power of the Scots.

=== Ireland ===
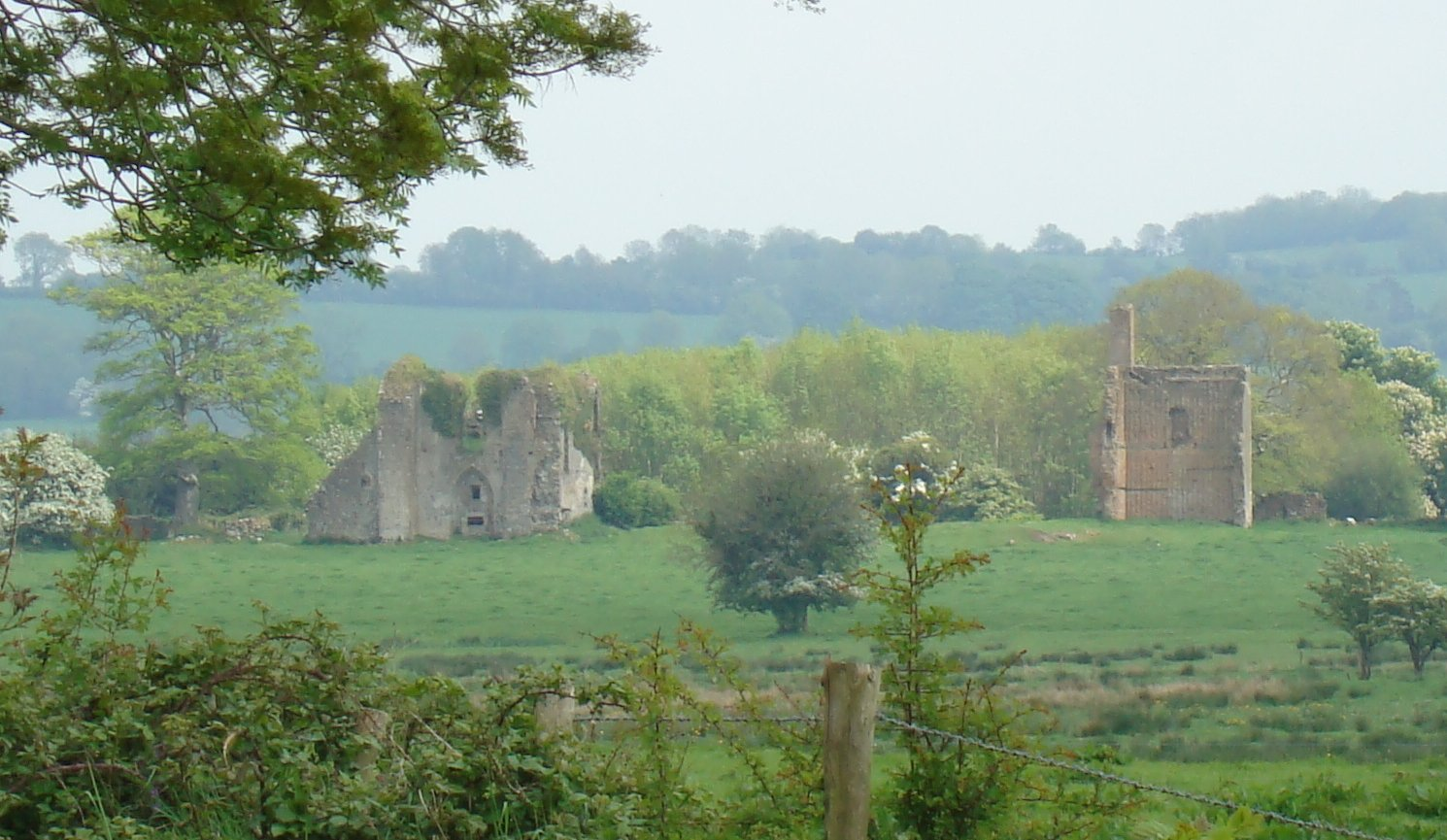
Tristernagh Abbey

Noted for saving Princess Elizabeth "from the rage and fury of her sister Queen Mary by conveying her privately away", in the 1560s he earned her favour after she became Queen Elizabeth, received considerable military rank, and was selected by her to go to Ireland in 1566.

For his services there, he was rewarded with a large land grant, including Tristernagh Abbey, which he made his family home.

In 1567, he received a reward of 1000 marks for bringing the head of Shane O'Neill, "pickled in a pipkin", to Sir Henry Sidney, to display on the gates of Dublin Castle, although it has been reported that Piers dug up Shane O'Neill's body and decapitated him. He was appointed governor of Carrickfergus, Seneschal of County Antrim in 1568.

After the death of Shane O'Neill, Piers proceeded to attempt to limit further Scottish incursions into the northeast and in the spring of 1569 suffered a defeat by 400 Scots in Clandeboye. He soon became Seneschal of Clandeboye, acting as the local representative of the crown and diplomatic intermediary between the central administration and local political leaders in the Irish community. He used his position to develop the commercial potential of Carrickfergus and from 1572 to 1573 he served as the city's mayor, strongly supported by influential local chiefs, such as Sir Brian McPhelim O'Neill, lord of Clandeboye.

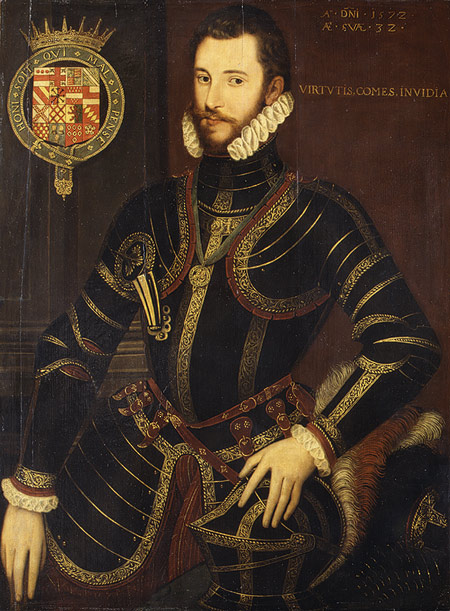
Walter Devereux, 1st Earl of Essex who failed to have Piers detained in 1574.

In 1574, he was arrested by Walter Devereux, 1st Earl of Essex who accused him of passing military intelligence to Sir Brian McPhelim O'Neill. Essex ordered Piers's arrest and detention in Carrickfergus Castle in December. But Piers was freed and was subsequently reappointed to the constableship of Carrickfergus in 1575. Sir Brian McPhelim O'Neill, on the contrary, was executed by Essex for treason.

Piers developed an interest in plantation projects in the northeast in the 1570s. In 1578, he was documented as sending proposals to the central London government to exploit the Ards peninsula and to create an incorporated company which would control the trade of the coast from Strangford to Sligo and gain control of the area by leasing the land to local chiefs, effectively banishing the Scots from Ulster. His commercial interests proved fruitless as well as his political attempts to make an agreement with Turlough Luineach, with royal support from the queen and the privy council to banish the Scots from Ulster in summer of 1580. Piers met strong opposition from Arthur Grey, 14th Baron Grey de Wilton who eventually prevented the proposals from being approved. Politically, this was a humiliating defeat for Piers and marked the decline of his power and status in Clandeboye.

== Later life ==
He retired to Tristernagh in 1582 and his health gradually declined, reported as losing the mobility of his legs in 1593. He did, however, return to England for a visit in 1591. Despite his withdrawal, he remained interested in the cause for the banishment of the Scots from Ulster and submitted proposals to weaken the power of Hugh O'Neill, 2nd Earl of Tyrone and attempted to increase the power of local chiefs lesser as barons, but again his proposals were rejected.

== Personal life ==
Piers married Ann Holt, of Holt Castle, County of Chester. He had one son, Henry, and two daughters, Mary and Anne. His nephew, William Piers, was a subsequent mayor of Carrickfergus. One of his descendants, his great-grandson, Sir Henry Piers, 1st Baronet (c. 1628–1691), established the Piers Baronets of Tristernagh Abbey in 1661. This lineage is still existent today.

Piers died in 1603 and was buried at Carrickfergus.
