= Lough Iron =

Lake on the River Inny, Ireland

Coordinates: 53°36′25″N 7°28′30″W

Designations

Ramsar Wetland
- Designated: 7 June 1996
- Reference no.: 850

Lough Iron (/lɒx ˈaɪərn/, lokh IERN; Irish: Loch Iarainn) is a small lake on the River Inny, in County Westmeath, Ireland.

== Description ==
A long and narrow lake, about 4 km (2.5 mi) in length, it lies downstream from Lough Derravaragh, close to Lough Owel. It is a renowned bird and wildlife sanctuary, and also known for its coarse fishing. The level of the lake has dropped dramatically since the 1960s due to drainage of the Inny; this has led to the development of freshwater marshes on large areas of the lake bed.

Lough Iron is not easily accessible as there is no road close to the lake or public access. Taking a boat down the River Inny is the only option.

== History and etymology ==
Local landowner and antiquarian Sir Henry Piers, writing in the 1680s, described a traditional story of the lake's origin:

"Its name need not be Englished, but, as tradition goeth, it hath it on this occasion; it is said, that of old here was no lake at all [...] a country farmer passing near, chanced to drop his plow-irons, which he was carrying to the forge, into the brook; hence it got a name, which in the Irish tongue sounds, the Iron-brook; this name held still, when the water prevailed over the low ground, the name was altered to that of the Iron-lake. This story I confess looks somewhat oddly"

Despite his reservations, Piers added that "at the northern end of the lake, where the Inny runneth into it (as aforesaid) in a fair, calm and clear summer's day, you may be able to trace the old channel of the Inny, and plainly discern in eight or ten foot of water, the ancient banks the river had, on both sides thereof, before it overflowed and drowned all. Hereof I myself and many others, are witness."
