= Sir Henry Piers, 1st Baronet =

Anglo-Irish landowner and soldier

Sir Henry Piers 1st Baronet (1629–1691), of Tristernagh Abbey, County Westmeath, Ireland was an Anglo-Irish landowner, soldier, Member of Parliament, Sheriff of Counties Longford and Westmeath, Sheriff of St Johnstown, and an antiquarian.

== Biography ==
Piers was the son of Sir William Piers and Martha, daughter of Sir James Ware and Mary Bryden, and sister of the antiquarian Sir James Ware. He was the grandson of Henry Piers and great-grandson of the English naval officer William Piers, who had been granted Tristernagh Abbey by Elizabeth I of England as a reward for military and other services in Ireland.

Piers served as a military officer in the 1640s, commanding a company in Colonel Castle's Regiment. He held the office of Sheriff of Counties Longford and Westmeath in 1657–1658. He was dubbed a knight by Henry Cromwell at Dublin Castle on 30 November 1658 (an honour that passed into oblivion with the Restoration in May 1660). He was Member of Parliament (MP) for Counties Longford and Westmeath in the Third Protectorate Parliament of 1659.

After the Restoration he was created a baronet on 18 February 1661. He was MP for St Johnstown, County Longford between 1661 and 1666 and held the office of High Sheriff of Westmeath in 1663.

== Works ==
Piers, whose mother was sister of the antiquarian Sir James Ware, is remembered largely for his Chorographical Description of the County of Westmeath written in 1682 and finally published in 1770. The Description contains many interesting historical details, such as an account of the ruins of Tristernagh Abbey (which were demolished in 1783 by Sir Henry's descendant, Pigott William Piers) and remains an important source of history of the area.

== Family ==
Around 1653 Piers married Mary Jones, daughter of Dr. Henry Jones, Bishop of Meath, and his first wife Jane Cullum. He was succeeded as baronet by his son and heir William. They also had seven other sons and six daughters. His descendants included Sir John Piers and Sir Vere Hunt.

== Notes ==
Baronetage of Ireland
New creation	Baronet (of Tristernagh Abbey); 1661–1691	Succeeded by William Piers
