= 21st Irish Film & Television Awards =

Irish media awards, held in 2025

- Date: 14 February 2025
- Site: Dublin Royal Convention Centre
- Hosted by: Kevin McGahern

Highlights
- Best Film: Small Things like These
- Best Direction: Rich Peppiatt; Kneecap
- Best Actor: Cillian Murphy; Small Things like These
- Best Actress: Saoirse Ronan; The Outrun
- Most awards: Film: Kneecap (4); Television: Bad Sisters (3) / Say Nothing (3)
- Most nominations: Film: Kneecap (17); Television: Say Nothing (10)

Television coverage
- Channel: RTÉ

The 21st Irish Film & Television Academy Awards, also called the IFTA Film & Drama Awards 2025 took place on 14 February 2025. The ceremony was held at the Dublin Royal Convention Centre for the second consecutive time. The host for the ceremony was Kevin McGahern. It honoured Irish films and television drama released between 1 January 2024 and 31 December 2024.

The nominations were announced on 14 January 2025. In the film categories, musical comedy-drama Kneecap led the nominations with seventeen, followed by Small Things Like These with nine. In the television side, Disney+'s miniseries Say Nothing received the most nominations with ten, followed by Apple TV+ drama series Bad Sisters with eight.

Nominees for the Rising Star Award were announced on 29 January 2025. The recipient was North Irish actor Anthony Boyle. Irish actor Colm Meaney will be honoured with the Lifetime Achievement Award, in recognition of his "extraordinary contributions to cinema and television".

In regards of the nominations, Academy CEO Áine Moriarty said "The 2025 nominees shortlisted for Irish Academy Awards this year is an incredible showcase of skill and talent in front and behind the camera". She also commented that "There is absolutely no doubt that Irish talent is amongst the best in the world, delivering such high standards of acting, filmmaking, and storytelling. The Irish Academy is proud to showcase this industry’s great work and to reward their achievements."

== Winners and nominees ==
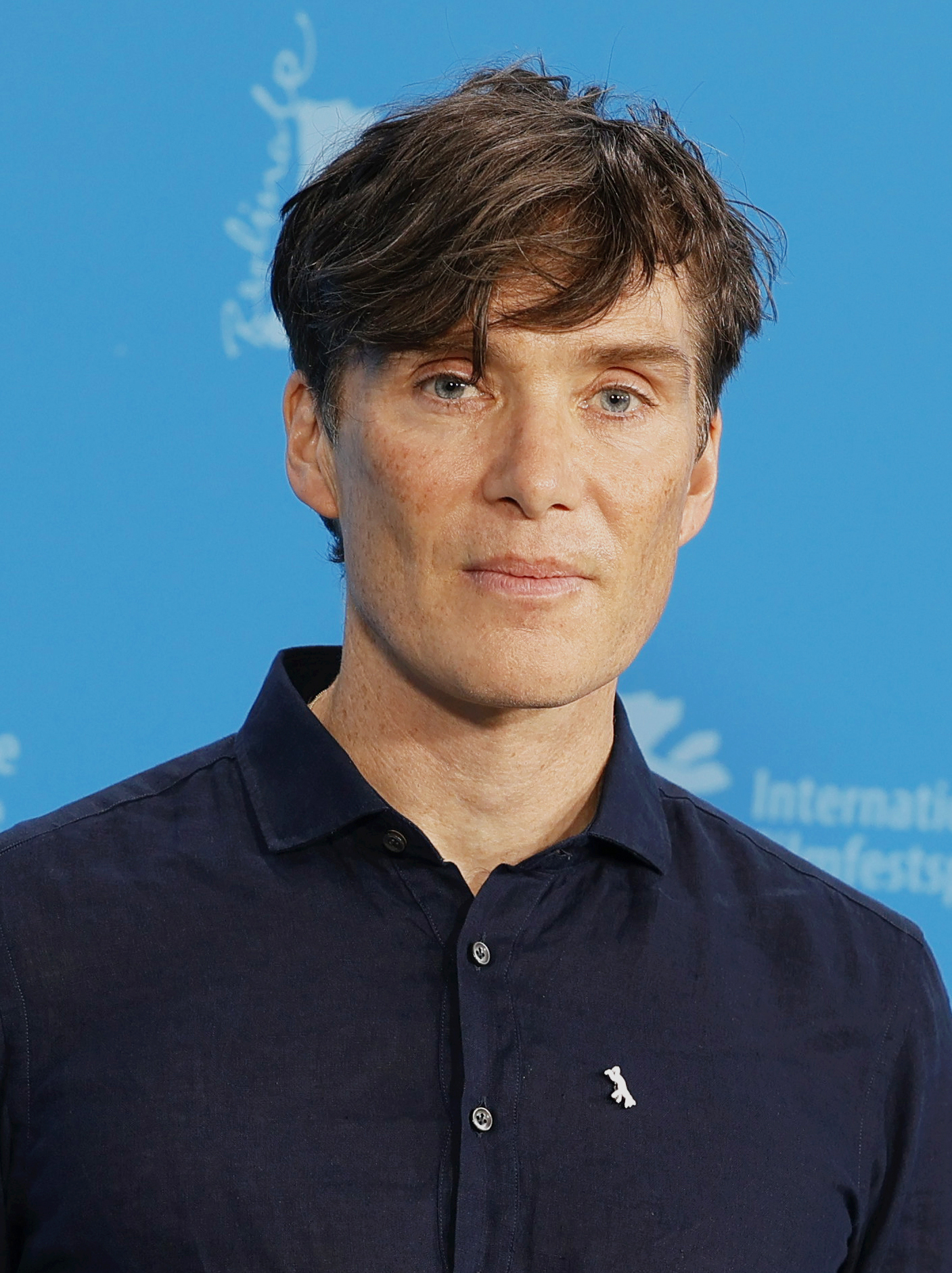
Cillian Murphy, Best Lead Actor winner

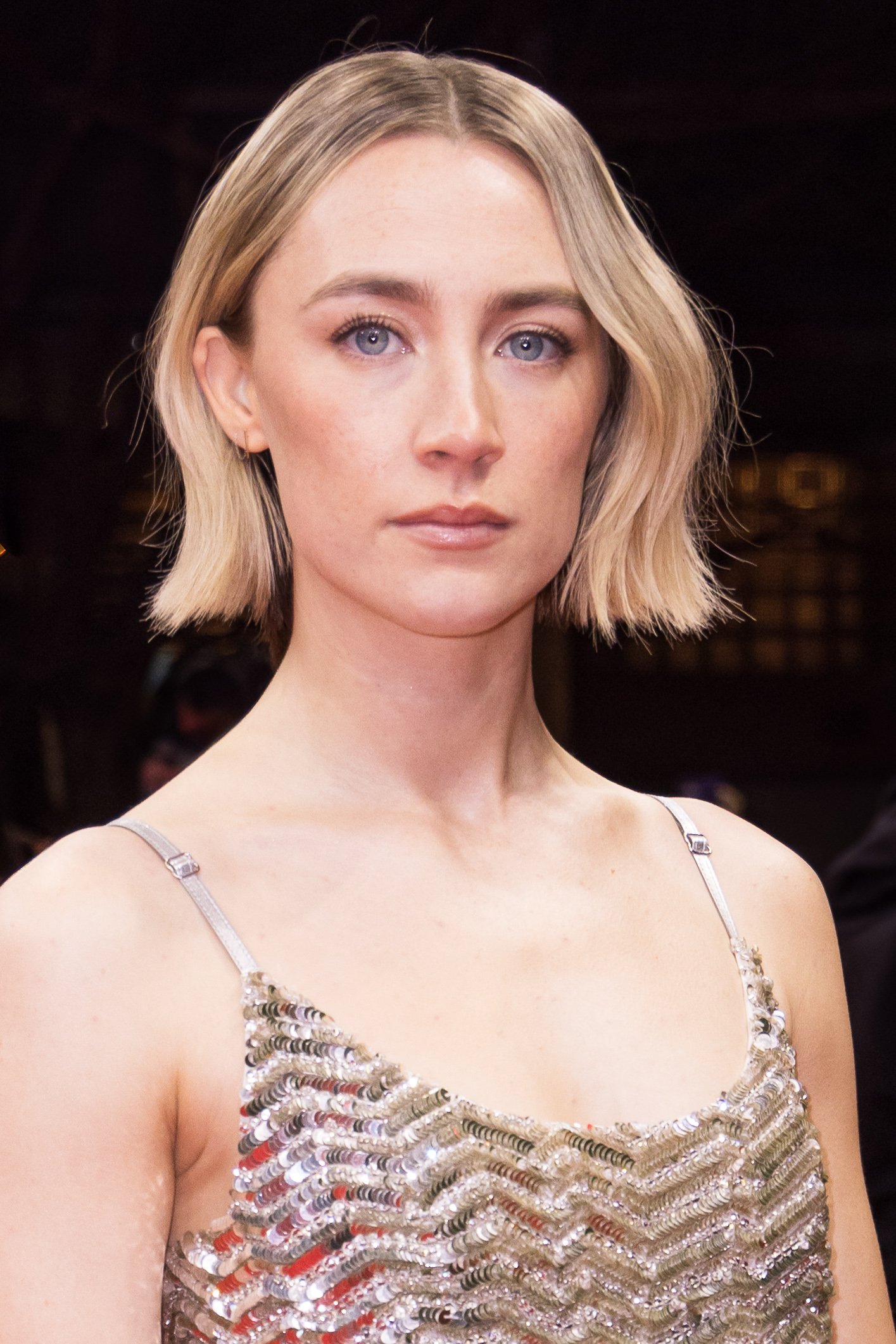
Saoirse Ronan, Best Lead Actress and Best Supporting Actress winner

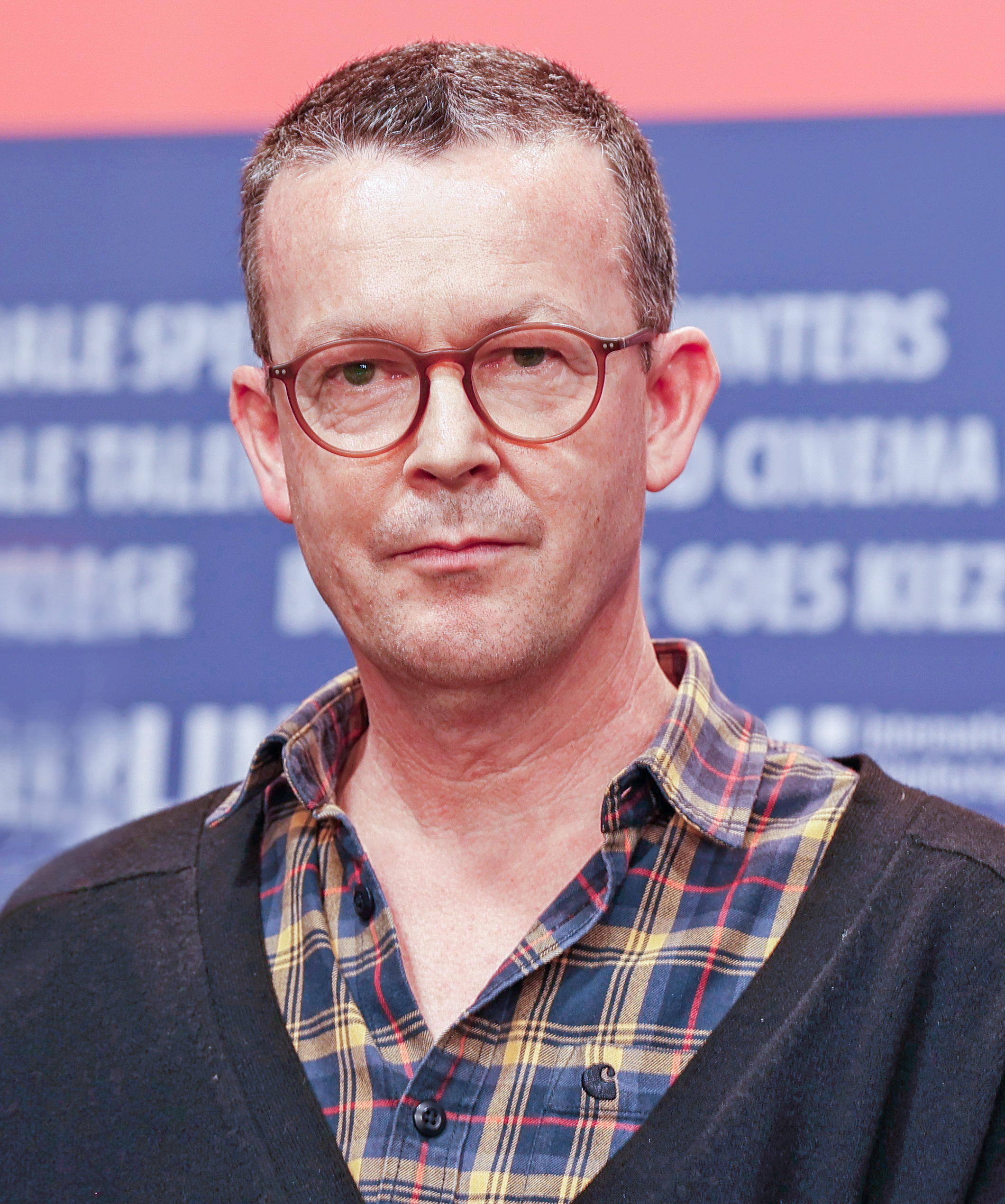
Enda Walsh, Best Film Script winner

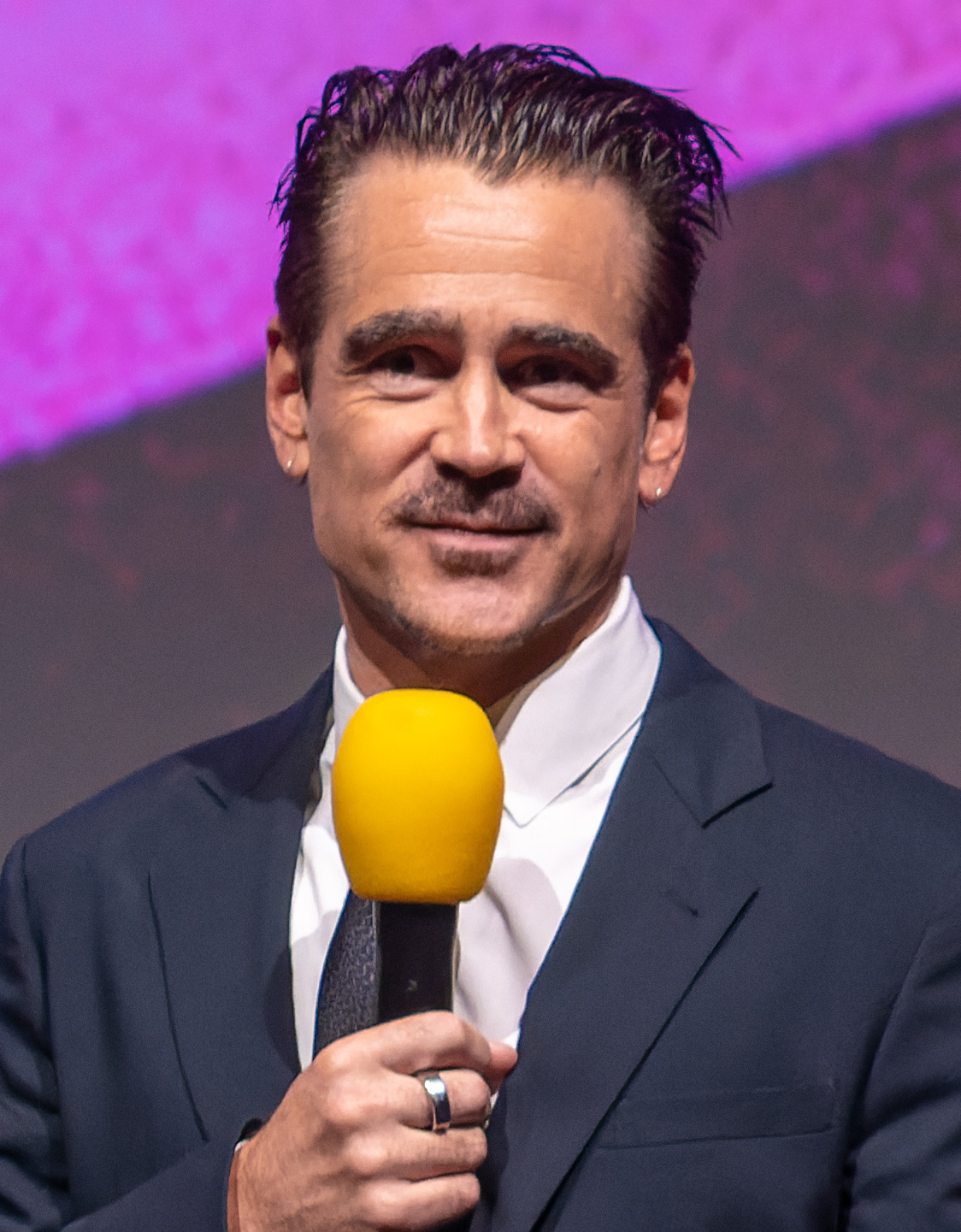
Colin Farrell, Best Lead Actor in Television winner

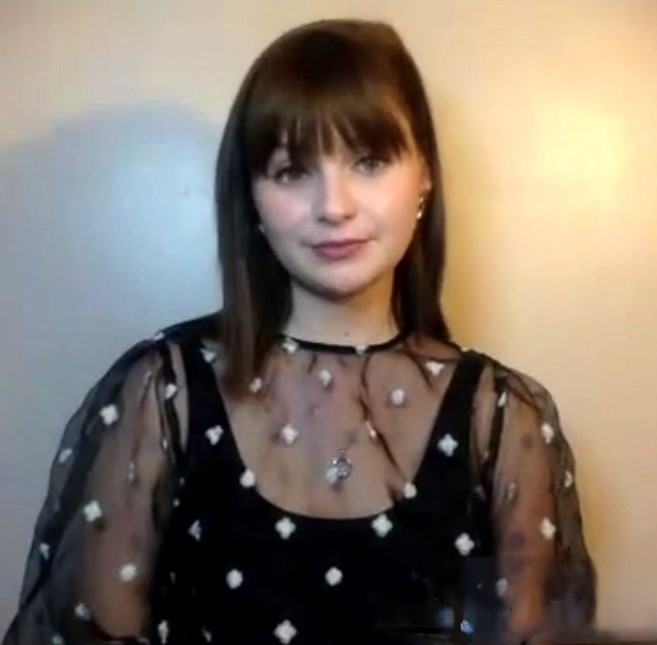
Lola Petticrew, Best Lead Actress in Television winner

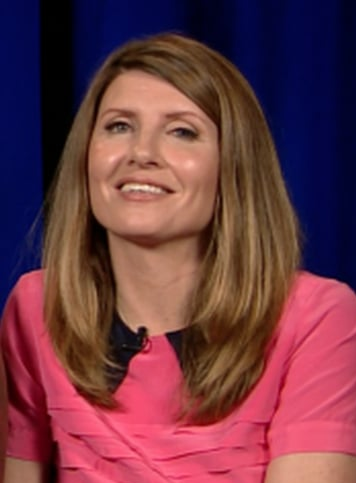
Sharon Horgan, Best Television Script winner

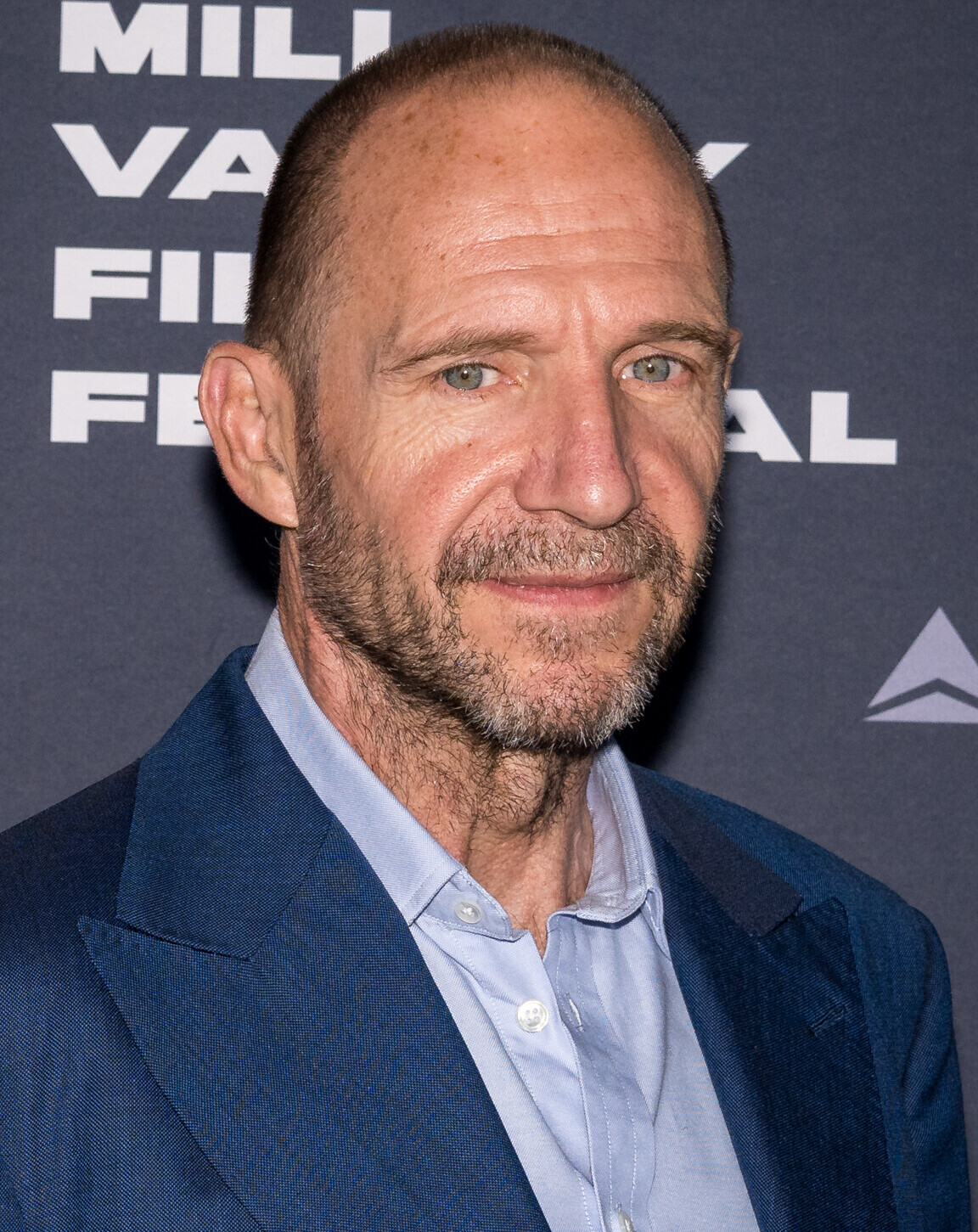
Ralph Fiennes, Best International Actor winner

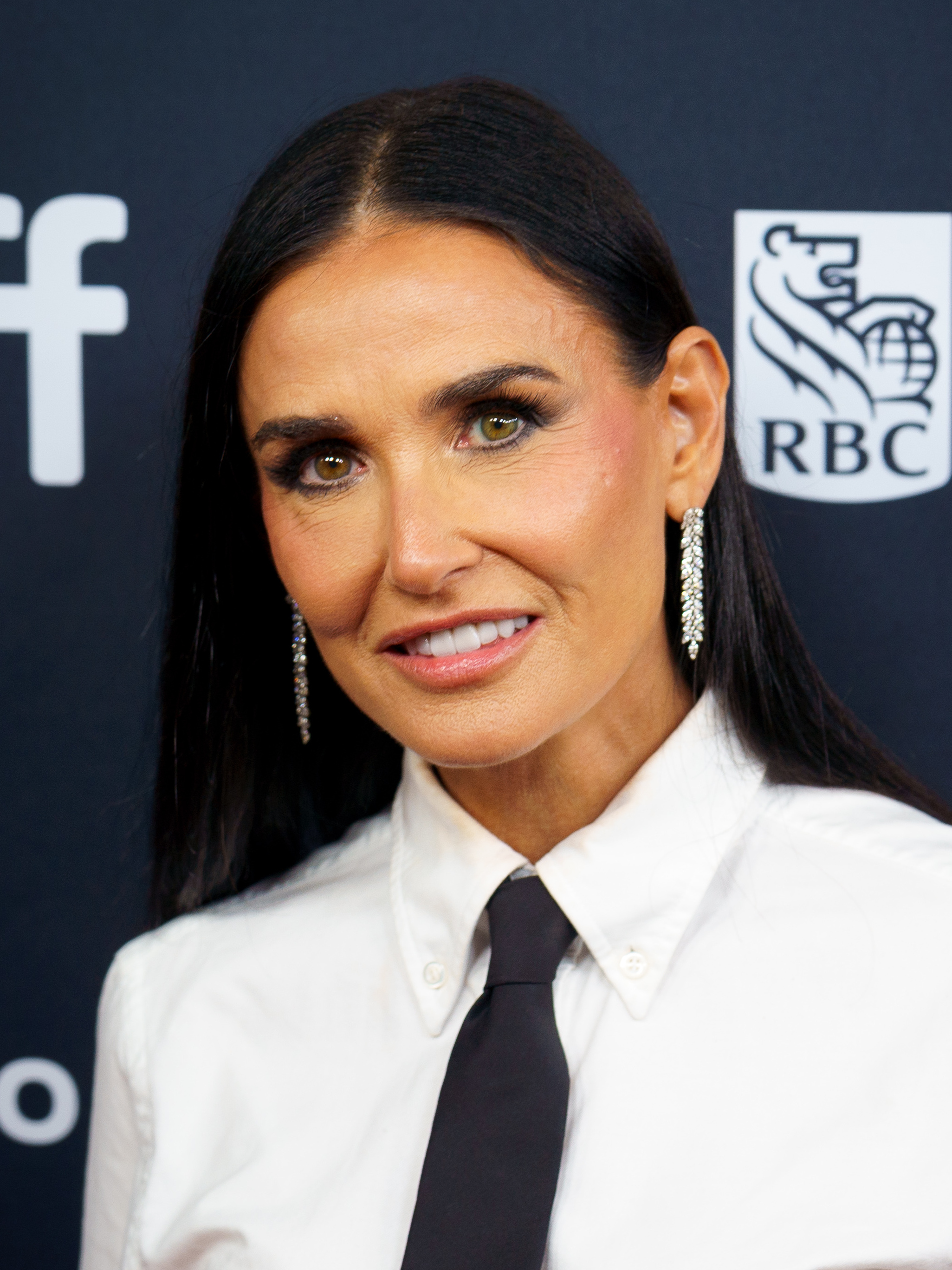
Demi Moore, Best International Actress winner

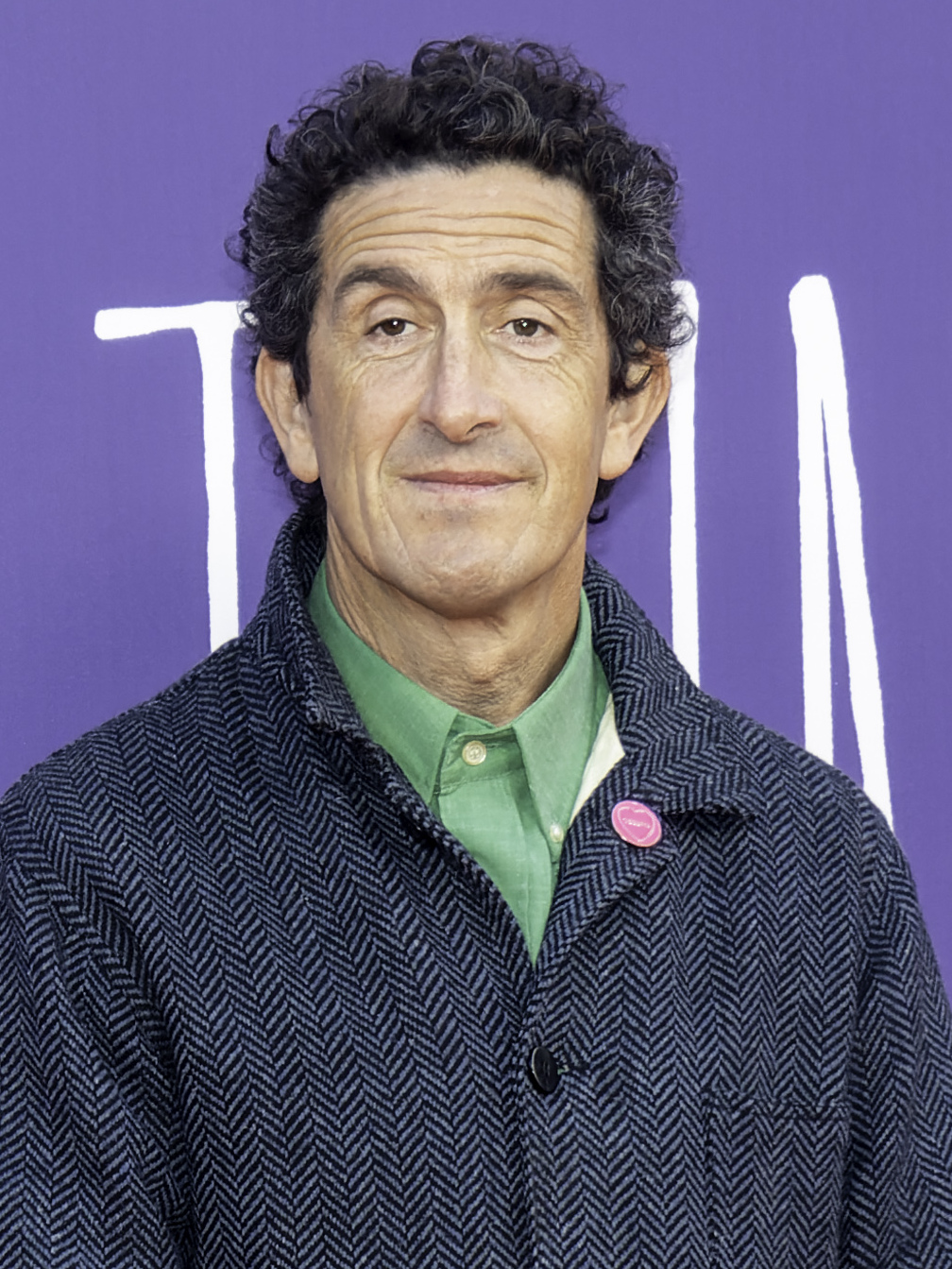
Robbie Ryan, Best Cinematography winner

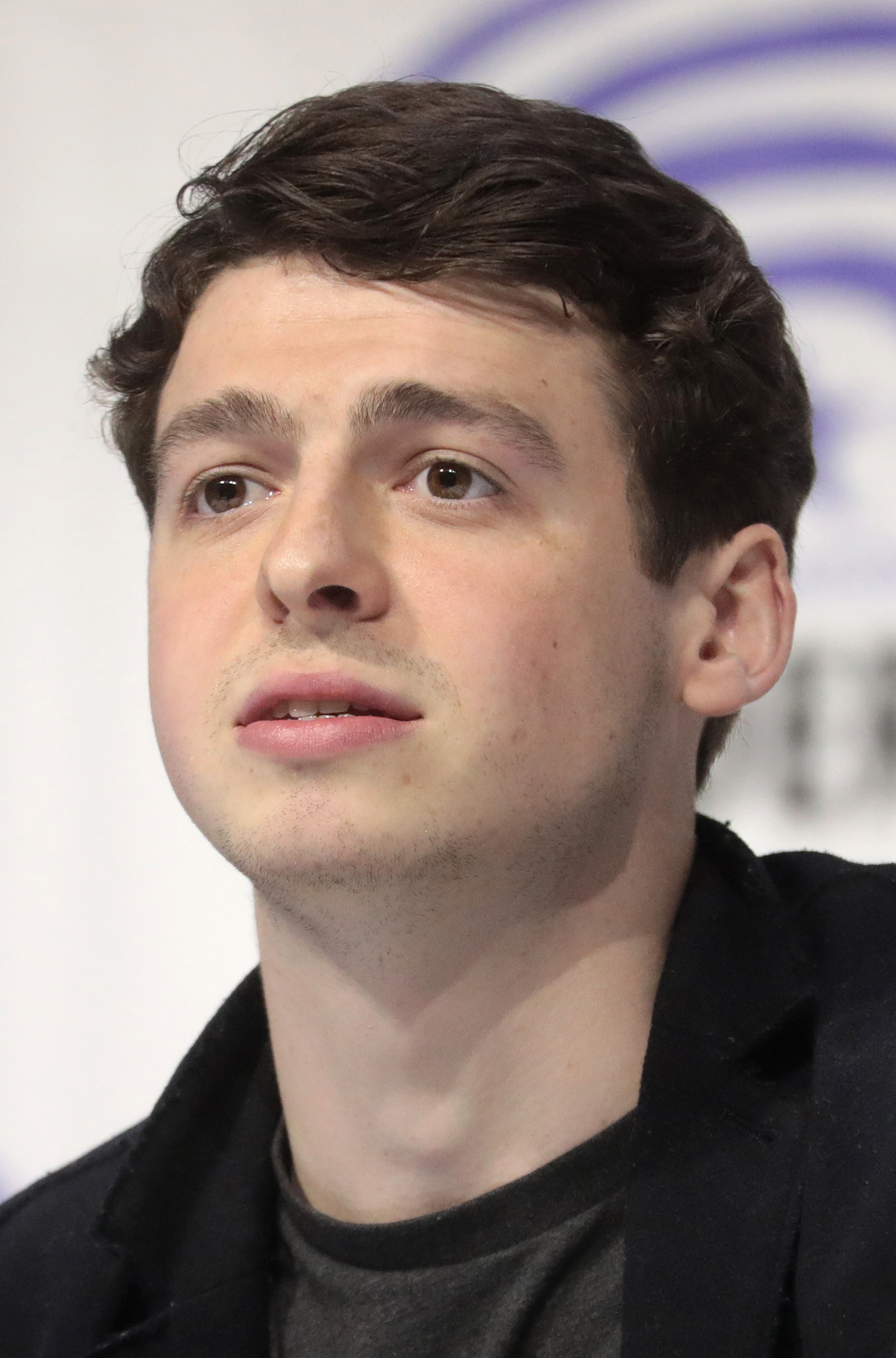
Anthony Boyle, Rising Star Award recipient

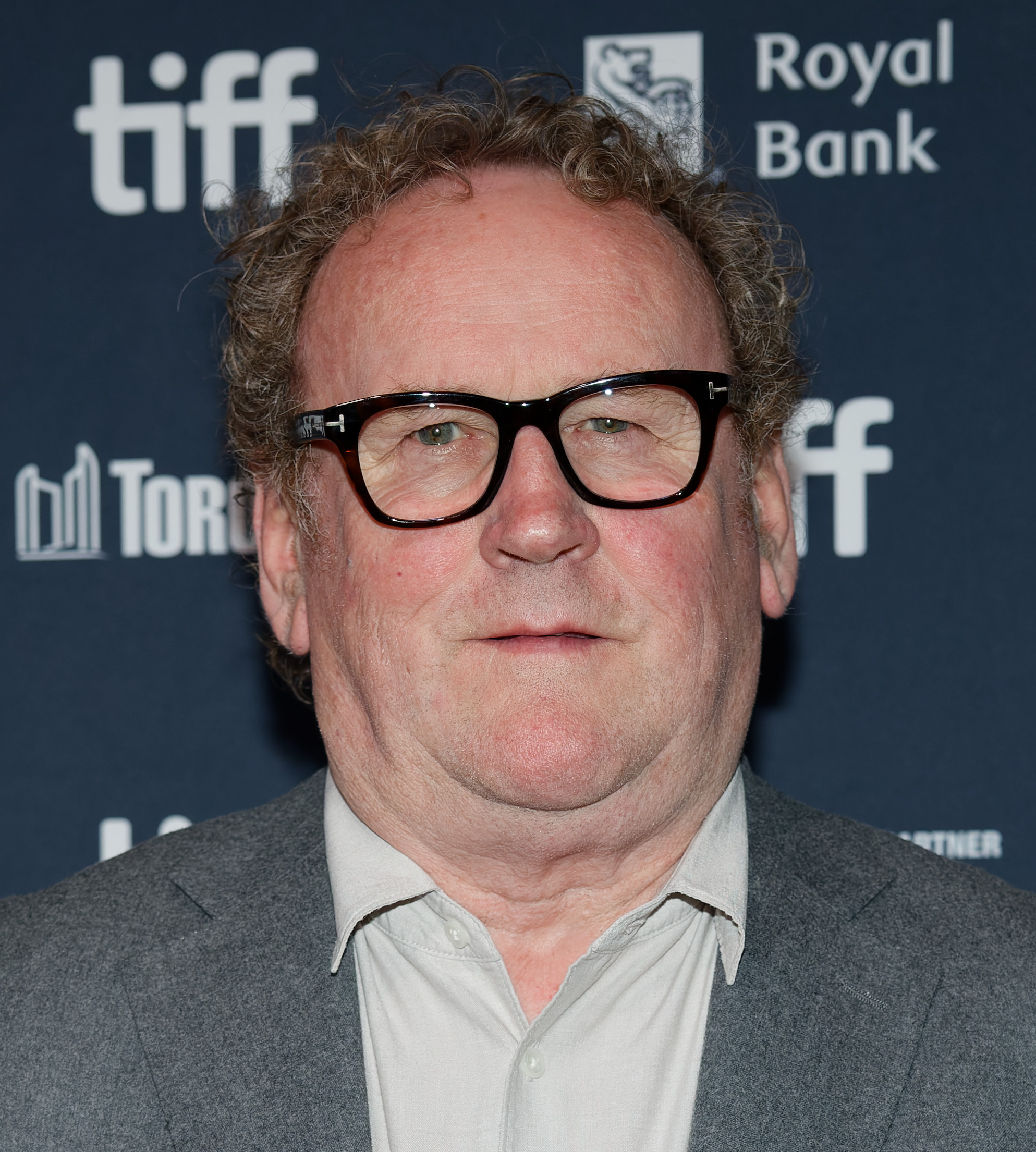
Colm Meaney, Lifetime Achievement Award recipient

=== Film ===
| Best Film | Best Director |
|---|---|
| Small Things Like These; Kathleen Is Here; King Frankie; Kneecap; Spilt Milk; The Apprentice | Rich Peppiatt – Kneecap; Eva Birthistle – Kathleen Is Here; John Crowley – We Live in Time; Brian Durnin – Spilt Milk; Damian McCarthy – Oddity; Christine Molloy, Joe Lawlor – Baltimore |
| Best Lead Actor | Best Lead Actress |
| Cillian Murphy – Small Things Like These as Bill Furlong; Peter Coonan – King Frankie as Frankie; Paul Mescal – Gladiator II as Lucius Verus Aurelius / "Hanno"; Naoise Ó Caireallain – Kneecap as himself; J.J. Ó Dochartaigh – Kneecap as himself; Liam Óg Ó hAnnaidh – Kneecap as himself | Saoirse Ronan – The Outrun as Rona; Carolyn Bracken – Oddity as Dani Odello-Timmis / Darcy Odello; Jessie Buckley – Wicked Little Letters as Rose Gooding; Hazel Doupe – Kathleen Is Here as Kathleen; Eileen Walsh – Small Things Like These as Eileen Furlong; Alisha Weir – Abigail as Abigail |
| Best Supporting Actor | Best Supporting Actress |
| Brían F. O'Byrne – Conclave as Monsignor Raymond O'Malley; Peter Coonan – Kathleen Is Here as Rory; Michael Fassbender – Kneecap as Arlo Ó Cairealláin; Barry Keoghan – Bird as Bug; Tom Vaughan-Lawlor – Baltimore as Dominic; Steve Wall – Oddity as Ivan | Saoirse Ronan – Blitz as Rita; Zara Devlin – Small Things Like These as Sarah; Clare Dunne – Kathleen Is Here as Dee; Fionnuala Flaherty – Kneecap as Caitlin; Simone Kirby – Kneecap as Dolores Ó Cairealláin; Jessica Reynolds – Kneecap as Georgia |
| Best Script | George Morrison Award for Best Feature Documentary |
| Small Things Like These – Enda Walsh; Kathleen Is Here – Eva Birthistle; Spilt Milk – Cara Loftus; Baltimore – Christine Molloy, Joe Lawlor; Kneecap – Rich Peppiatt; Abigail – Stephen Shields | The Flats – Alessandra Celesia; Face Down: The Disappearance of Thomas Niedermayer – Gerry Gregg; Don't Forget to Remember – Ross Killeen; Blue Road: The Edna O'Brien Story – Sinéad O'Shea; Mrs Robinson – Aoife Kelleher; Brendan Gleeson's Farewell to Hughes's – Ciarán Ó Maonaigh |
| Best Live Action Short Film | Best Animated Short Film |
| Clodagh – Portia A. Buckley; Farmers!? – Freddie Leyden; Room Taken – TJ O'Grady Peyton; Turnaround – Aisling Byrne; Two Mothers – Anna Rodgers; We Beg to Differ – Ruairi Bradley; Wife of the Future – Rory Hanrahan; Wrecker – Martina McGlynn | Dembaya – Borja Espana Guillot; Every Other Weekend – Margaret Rose; Homebird – Ewa Smyk; Nightpay – Rachel Fitzgerald |

=== Television ===
| Best Drama | Best Director |
|---|---|
| Bad Sisters (Apple TV+); Say Nothing (Disney+); The Dry (RTÉ One / ITVX); Bodkin (Netflix); Blue Lights (BBC One); Crá (TG4) | Dearbhla Walsh – Bad Sisters (Apple TV+); Paddy Breathnach – The Dry (RTÉ One / ITVX); Brian Kirk – The Day of the Jackal (Sky Atlantic / Peacock); Michael Lennox – Say Nothing (Disney+); Lisa Mulcahy – Sanctuary: A Witch's Tale (Sundance Now); Hannah Quinn – The Boy That Never Was (RTÉ) |
| Best Lead Actor | Best Lead Actress |
| Colin Farrell – The Penguin as Oswald "Oz" Cobb / The Penguin (HBO); Anthony Boyle – Say Nothing as Brendan Hughes (Disney+); Michael Fassbender – The Agency as Brandon Cunningham (Paramount+ with Showtime); Ciarán Hinds – The Dry as Tom Sheridan (RTÉ One / ITVX); Andrew Scott – Ripley as Tom Ripley (Netflix); Aidan Turner – Rivals as Declan O'Hara (Disney+) | Lola Petticrew – Say Nothing as Dolours Price (Disney+); Elaine Cassidy – Sanctuary: A Witch's Tale as Sarah Fenn (Sundance Now); Nicola Coughlan – Bridgerton as Penelope Bridgerton (Netflix); Siobhán Cullen – Bodkin as Dubheasa "Dove" Maloney (Netflix); Roisin Gallagher – The Dry as Shiv Sheridan (RTÉ One / ITVX); Sharon Horgan – Bad Sisters as Eva Garvey (Apple TV+) |
| Best Supporting Actor | Best Supporting Actress |
| Tom Vaughan-Lawlor – Say Nothing as older Brendan Hughes (Disney+); Anthony Boyle – Masters of the Air as Lieutenant Harry Crosby (Apple TV+); Liam Cunningham – 3 Body Problem as Thomas Wade (Netflix); Michael Smiley – Bad Sisters as Roger Muldoon (Apple TV+); Chris Walley – Bodkin as Sean O'Shea (Netflix); David Wilmot – Bodkin as Seamus Gallagher (Netflix) | Hazel Doupe – Say Nothing as Marian Price (Disney+); Siobhán Cullen – The Dry as Caroline Sheridan (RTÉ One / ITVX); Eve Hewson – Bad Sisters as Becka Garvey (Apple TV+); Ruth Negga – Presumed Innocent as Barbara Sabich (Apple TV+); Fiona Shaw – Bad Sisters as Angelica Muldoon (Apple TV+); Victoria Smurfit – Rivals as Maud O'Hara (Disney+) |
Best Script
Bad Sisters – Sharon Horgan (Apple TV+); Faithless – Baz Ashmawy (Virgin Media Television); The Day of the Jackal – Ronan Bennett (Sky Atlantic / Peacock); The Dry – Nancy Harris (RTÉ One / ITVX); Blue Lights – Adam Patterson, Declan Lawn (BBC One); Say Nothing – Kirsten Sheridan, Joshua Zetumer (Disney+)

=== International Film ===
Best International Film
Conclave; Anora; Dune: Part Two; The Brutalist; The Outrun; The Substance
| Best International Actor | Best International Actress |
| Ralph Fiennes – Conclave as Cardinal Thomas Lawrence; Adrien Brody – The Brutalist as László Tóth; Timothee Chalamet – A Complete Unknown as Bob Dylan; Kieran Culkin – A Real Pain as Benjamin "Benji" Kaplan; Sebastian Stan – The Apprentice as Donald Trump; Denzel Washington – Gladiator II as Macrinus | Demi Moore – The Substance as Elizabeth Sparkle; Cynthia Erivo – Wicked as Elphaba Thropp; Angelina Jolie – Maria as Maria Callas; Mikey Madison – Anora as Anora "Ani" Mikheeva; Florence Pugh – We Live in Time as Almut Brühl; Emily Watson – Small Things Like These as Sister Mary |

=== Craft & Technical (Film and Television) ===
| Best Casting | Best Cinematography |
|---|---|
| Kneecap – Carla Stronge; Baltimore – Emma Gunnery; Bodkin – Louise Kiely (Netflix); Say Nothing – Lucy Amos, Nina Gold (Disney+); Small Things Like These – Maureen Hughes | Bird – Robbie Ryan; Fréwaka – Narayan Van Maele; Kneecap – Ryan Kernaghan; Say Nothing – Stephen Murphy (Disney+); The Penguin – Darran Tiernan (HBO) |
| Best Costume Design | Best Production Design |
| Kneecap – Zjena Glamocanin; Abigail – Gwen Jeffares Hourie; House of the Dragon – Caroline McCall (HBO); Spilt Milk – Gwen Jeffares Hourie; Vikings: Valhalla – Susan O’Connor-Cave (Netflix) | Abigail – Susie Cullen; Bodkin – Paki Smith (Netflix); Kneecap – Nicola Moroney; The Tourist – Philip Murphy (Netflix); Vikings: Valhalla – Tom Conroy (Netflix) |
| Best Hair & Makeup | Best Editing |
| The Apprentice – Sandra Kelly, Tom McInerney; Abigail – Linda Gannon, Liz Byrne; Kneecap – Liz Boston; Small Things Like These – Lorraine Glynn, Lynn Johnston; Vikings: Valhalla – Joe Whelan, Tom McInerney (Netflix) | Kneecap – Julian Ulrichs & Chris Gill; Bad Sisters – Derek Holland (Apple TV+); Kathleen Is Here – Colin Campbell; Paddington in Peru – Úna Ní Dhonghaíle; Say Nothing – Edel McDonnell (Disney+) |
| Best Sound | Best Original Music |
| Oddity – Aza Hand, Hugo Parvery; Abigail – Hugh Fox; Blackshore – John "Bob" Brennan, Mark Henry, Fionan Higgins (RTÉ One); Kneecap – Aza Hand, Brendan Rehill, Chris Woodcock; Small Things Like These – Hugh Fox, Senjan Jansen | Fréwaka – Die Hexen; The Apprentice – David Holmes; The Dry – Sarah Lynch (RTÉ One / ITVX); The Magic Reindeer: Saving Santa's Sleigh – Eimear Noone, Craig Stuart Garfinkle; The Song Cycle – Ray Harman |
Best VFX
Shōgun – Ed Bruce, Andrew Barry (FX); 3 Body Problem – Ed Bruce, Liam Neville (Netflix); Bodkin – John Kennedy, Lisa Maher (Netflix); Sanctuary: A Witch's Tale – Dan Cullen (Sundance Now)

== Special ==
=== Rising Star ===
- Anthony Boyle (Actor — House of Guinness, Manhunt, Masters of the Air, Say Nothing, Tetris)
  - Aislinn Clarke (Director/Writer — The Devil's Doorway, Eye Exam, Fréwaka)
  - Clinton Liberty (Actor — Holding, House of the Dragon, Normal People, Red Election, Touchdown)
  - Alisha Weir (Actor — Abigail, Matilda the Musical, Wicked Little Letters)

=== Irish Academy Award for Lifetime Achievement ===
- Colm Meaney (for his extraordinary contributions to cinema and television)

== See also ==
- 2024 in Irish television
- 78th British Academy Film Awards
- 2025 British Academy Television Awards
