= Lyons Demesne =

Country estate in County Kildare, Ireland

- Location within Ireland

General information
- Location: Newcastle Demesne, County Kildare, Ireland
- Coordinates: 53°18′4″N 6°32′42″W
- Construction started: 1785
- Completed: 1797

Design and construction
- Architect: Oliver Grace
- Other designers: Gaspare Gabrielli (1805-08) -decoration of hall, music room and drawing room

Renovating team
- Architects: Richard Morrison (1802-05) - alterations and additions

Lyons Demesne, also Lyons Estate, is a country house and estate in Lyons Hill, County Kildare, Ireland. It is located near Newcastle Demesne and Celbridge, to the northeast of Tipperstown, 24.8 kilometres (15.4 mi) west of the city centre of Dublin. The Georgian house, completed in 1797 under architect Oliver Grace, is set in 600 acres (240 ha).

Historically, Lyons was the setting of a notable duel between Daniel O'Connell and John D'Esterre.

University College Dublin, Lyons Research Farm consists of a portion of the original Lyons Estate and is used by the School of Agriculture, Food Science and Veterinary Medicine for teaching and research activities.

== History ==
Michael Aylmer inherited the estate at the age of four in 1733 and became indebted to the banker Sir Nicholas Lawless (later Baron Cloncurry), eventually losing the house in 1796. Lawless commissioned architect Grace to build a "grand Georgian mansion" in 1785, and it was completed in 1797. His son, Valentine Lawless, 2nd Baron Cloncurry, continued the efforts between 1804 and 1810, developing the house further. In 1807 Lady Cloncurry was observed there by an Italian painter, Gaspare Gabrielli, who had been hired to paint the frescoes, committing adultery with a neighbour, Sir John Piers, 6th Baronet. As a result, her husband divorced her following an action for criminal conversation which aroused enormous public interest.

A duel took place at Lyons in 1815 subsequent to a speech made by O'Connell. He was challenged by John D'Esterre, a member of Dublin Corporation, who objected to O'Connell's description of 'Corpo' being a 'beggarly corporation'. The expectation was that D'Esterre would kill O'Connell. However, it was O'Connell who mortally wounded D'Esterre with a shot in the hip which lodged the bullet in D'Esterre's stomach.

Frederick Lawless, a brother of the writer, naturalist, and historian Emily Lawless, with whom she was very close, was the last heir to the estate, after their elder brother Valentine died without a male heir in 1928. But his occupancy was short-lived, as Frederick himself died on 18 July 1928, and the title was extinguished.

University College Dublin purchased the Lyons Estate in 1963, the purchase consisting of Lyons House and approximately 1,200 acres (490 ha). In the early 1990s, the university sold the house and half of the land, approximately 620 acres. It was later owned by Michael Smurfit. It was purchased by Ryanair businessman Tony Ryan in 1996 for £Ir3.5 million, who spent approximately £Ir80m/€100 million renovating it, and it was bequeathed to his sons upon his death.

The Ryan family put the house up for sale in 2009 for €90 million, cutting the price to €50 million in 2010, €32 million in 2012 and €30 million in 2013, but were unable to find a buyer.

The village part of the estate was sold to the Cliff Collection in 2016 and developed into a hotel called Cliff at Lyons. The restaurant Aimsir opened in 2019, and earned two Michelin stars.

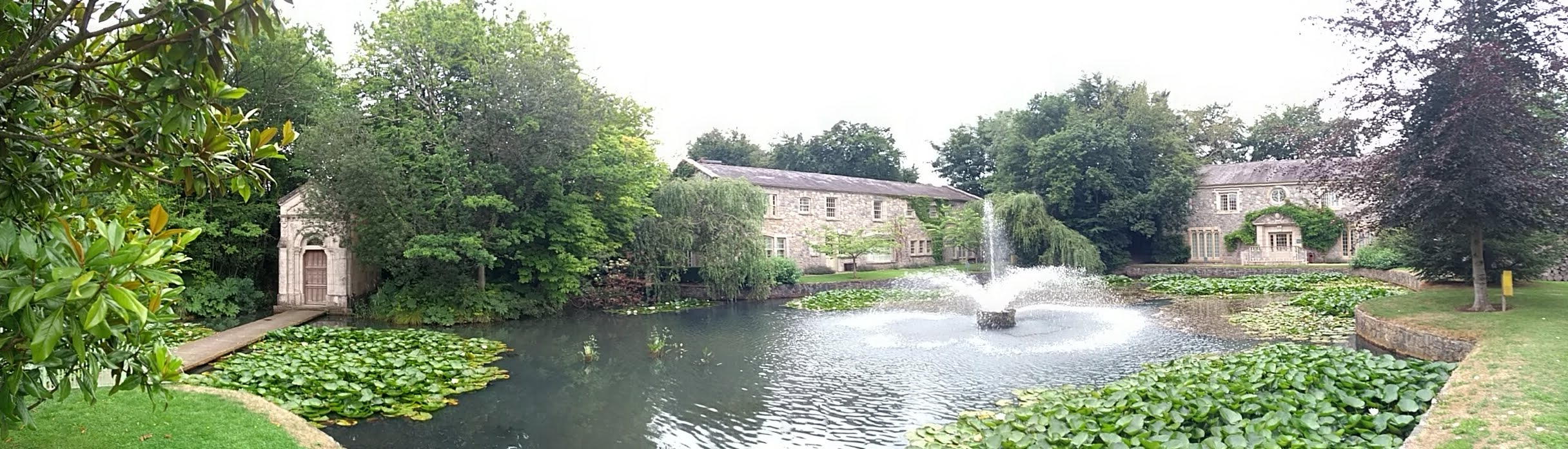
Part of the village of the Lyons Estate which has now been restored and turned into a hotel

== Architecture and fittings ==
Lyons Demesne, considered a "Georgian treasure", was completed between 1785 and 1797. Later, Valentine Lawless, 2nd Baron Cloncurry, spent £200,000 on renovation including frescoes by Gaspare Gabrielli and three shiploads of classical art imported from Italy. A fourth shipment was lost when it sank off Wicklow. Treasures which were successfully imported include three columns from the ruins of the Golden House of Nero in Rome, used in the portico, and a statue of Venus excavated at Ostia. Country Life, which regards Lyons as Ireland's most significant estate, says of it, "There are seven suites in the main house, a self contained guest wing with four bedrooms and staff quarters in the north wing." The house has its own private cinema, gymnasium, billiards room, helicopter landing pad, traditional Irish pub, wine cellar, and half Olympic-sized swimming pool. It is decorated in the Directoire style, of which there are few examples in Ireland.

== Grounds ==
The gardens of the estate were developed by Lawless between 1804 and 1810. There are an additional five lodges on the estate, a 22 acres (8.9 ha) spring-fed, stocked lake, stables, stud farm facilities and natural gallops. The University College Dublin Lyons Research Farm consists of a portion of the original Lyons Estate, having retained approximately 580 acres (230 ha), which are used by the School of Agriculture, Food Science and Veterinary Medicine for teaching and research activities.
