= Valentine Lawless, 2nd Baron Cloncurry =

Irish peer, politician and landowner

Valentine Brown Lawless, 2nd Baron Cloncurry (19 August 1773 – 28 October 1853), was an Irish peer, politician and landowner. In the 1790s he was an emissary in radical and reform circles in London for the Society of United Irishmen, and was twice detained on suspicion of sedition. He gained notoriety for his celebrated lawsuit for adultery against his former friend Sir John Piers, who had seduced Cloncurry's first wife, Elizabeth Georgiana Morgan. He took up residence at Lyons Hill, Ardclough, County Kildare and, commensurate with his status as an Anglo-Irish lord, appeared to reconcile to the Dublin authorities. Lawless served as a Viceregal advisor and eventually gained a British peerage, but it was not as an Ascendancy loyalist. He pressed the case for admitting Catholics to parliament and for ending the universal imposition of Church of Ireland tithes.

== Family and education ==
Lawless was born in Merrion Square in Dublin. His father, Nicholas Lawless, son of the Dublin merchant Robert Lawless, who Lawless recounts was "one of the many Irish Roman Catholics" who sought, in France, the "liberty to enjoy those privileges of property and talent from which they were debarred [under the Penal Laws] in their native land". He purchased an estate near Rouen; but finding that in France the Catholic Church "made invidious distinctions in the distribution of her honours among the faithful", not only returned to Ireland but conformed to the established Anglican communion. A successful wool merchant and banker, Nicholas Lawless was created a baronet in 1776 and elevated to the Irish peerage as Baron Cloncurry in 1789. Valentine's mother was Margaret Browne, only daughter and heiress of Valentine Browne of Mount Browne, County Limerick; she died in 1795. The family lived mainly at Maretimo House, Blackrock, Dublin, which Nicholas had built around 1770.

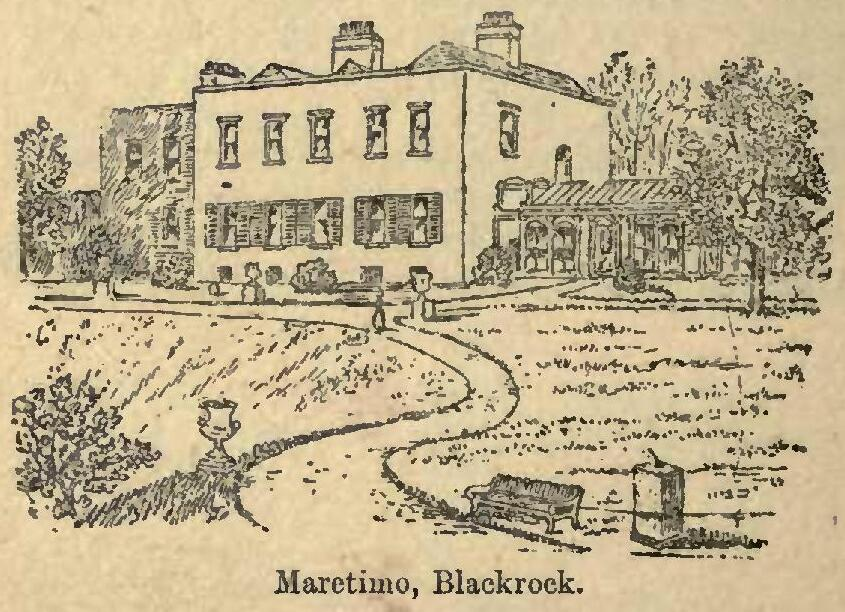
Maretimo House, Blackrock, in 1909

At the age of 12 years he was placed at the school of the Rev. Dr. Burrowes, at Prospect, Blackrock: "not then sent", he remarked, like many of his class "to learn absenteeism and contempt, too often hatred, for our country, in the schools and colleges of England." With a view to preparing him for Oxford, he was briefly enrolled King's School, Chester, but prevailed on his father to let him study in his "native city". In 1792, Lawless graduated with a bachelor in arts from Trinity College Dublin. While at Trinity he was active in the Historical Society, the club formed by Edmund Burke, in which, preceding Lawless, the future United Irishmen Wolfe Tone and Thomas Addis Emmet had engaged in their first debates. He then spent two years in Switzerland.

Lawless was to write that while he "left Ireland with a mind freely sown with the seeds of love of country and nationality, and hatred of the oppressions imposed upon the Irish masses by the oligarchy into whose hands the legislative power had fallen", he returned "more Irish than ever". Among the French emigres he encountered in Switzerland, were officers of the Irish Brigade. While he little sympathises with "the cause of royalty" for which they had suffered, he was moved by the tales of the betrayal and dispossession that, following the Williamite War in Ireland, had forced their fathers to seek fortune abroad.

== Revolutionary career ==
Lawless returned to Ireland in the spring of 1795 after hopes of reform had been dashed by the recall of William Fitzwilliam who, Lord Lieutenant, had spoken in favour of Catholic Emancipation. In June 1795, Lawless was sworn into the Dublin Society of United Irishman. According to his own account, he took the Society's original—as he saw it, pre-republican—membership test. Composed by William Drennan, this committed Lawless to forward a "union of power among Irishmen of every religious" so as to attain "an impartial and adequate representation of the Irish nation in parliament". Reflecting the growing impatience and insurrectionary tenor of the movement, a convention in Belfast had, the previous month, adopted amendments dropping the reference to the Irish Parliament and swearing members to secrecy.

Lawless played an open, constitutionalist, role, publicly protesting what he knew to be Prime Minister William Pitt's undeclared Irish policy: the abolition of the Dublin parliament and the incorporation of Ireland into a united kingdom with Great Britain. In the spring of 1797, he wrote and published his Thoughts on the Projected Union between Great Britain and Ireland, the first of a long succession of pamphlets on the subject. He was also a regular contributor to the paper of the Dublin Society of United Irishmen, The Press. On the dissolution of parliament in 1797, he tried to persuade Lord Edward Fitzgerald to stand, as he had in 1790, for County Kildare as a Patriot and to oppose a union. He also presided over a large anti-union protest meeting at the Royal Exchange. But then, with Fitzgerald, Lawless began attending the United Irish executive in Dublin which increasingly turned to preparations for a French-assisted insurrection.

Lawless personally administered the society's new test to Father James Coigly, who was to be the executive principal agent in attempts to coordinate an insurrection with radical circles in England and with the French directory. Valentine, himself, seconded Cogly efforts in London where he is known to have been in contact with Edward Despard who, in 1803, was to hang as the alleged ringleader in a plot to assassinate the king.

At the end of February 1798 Coigly was arrested with Arthur O'Connor and three others seeking a Channel crossing in Margate. Coigly, carrying an address from the "United Britons" to the Directory in Paris, was convicted of treason and hanged. In furnishing funds for Coigly's defence, Lawless heightened the suspicion with which he was regarded by the authorities. On 31 May 1798, he was arrested at his London lodgings and was committed to the Tower of London where he was held, without charge, until March 1801. It was widely believed that his long imprisonment hastened his father's death in August 1799.

== Paris and Rome ==
On his release, Lawless went to Paris and then Rome, where he met and married his first wife, Elizabeth Gergiana Morgan, daughter of General Charles Morgan. It was an impulsive love marriage to a "woman he adored", but which he later came to regret as "hasty and imprudent". He was in Rome during Robert Emmet's rebellion and is believed by Emmet's biographer Ruan O’Donnell to have been a member of the new Republican Government in waiting. Lawless used his time in Rome to purchase works of art being sold off by Italian nobles under pressure from Napoleon's oppressive taxation, and sent four shiploads to Ireland for the refurbishment of Lyons House. They included a statue of Venus excavated at Ostia and three pillars from the palace of Nero originally looted from Egypt, but other artefacts were lost when the third shipment sank off Wicklow Head.

== Lyons House ==
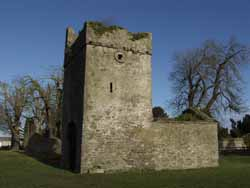
Lyons House

Lawless returned in 1804 to oversee Sir Richard Morrison's £200,000 refurbishment of Lyons House (equivalent to £16.98m today) and the reorganisation of his extensive estates. He employed the Italian painter Gaspare Gabrielli to paint the frescoes, a fact which assumed great significance during his subsequent action against Sir John Piers for adultery.

At Lyons, Lawless hosted Catherine Despard, possibly at the request of Sir Francis Burdett who had helped secure her a pension following the execution of her husband, Captain Edward Despard, for treason (the Despard Plot) in 1803.

== Divorce and remarriage ==
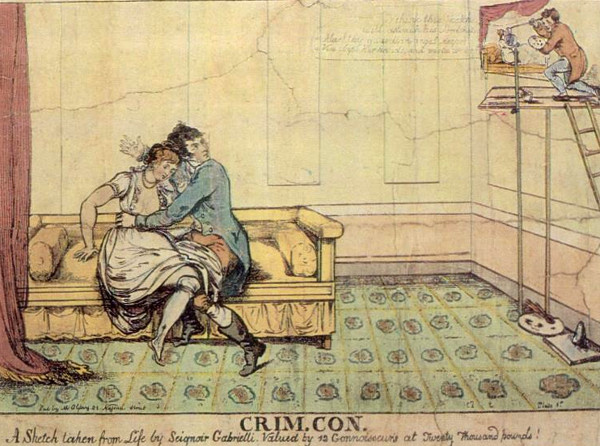
Crim. Con, a cartoon of Sir John Piers and Lady Cloncurry witnessed in an embrace by the painter Gaspare Gabrielli. The caption claims that the sketch "has been valued by 12 Connoisseurs at Twenty Thousand pounds!", a satirical allusion to the sum awarded to Lord Cloncurry by the jury in the ensuing criminal conversation court case of 1807.

In 1807 Lawless brought a sensational action for criminal conversation against Sir John Bennett Piers, 6th Baronet, a neighbour and school friend, whose dalliance with Lady Cloncurry had been witnessed by the painter Gaspare Gabrielli while he was at work painting frescoes at Lyons House. The lurid details of the case aroused huge public interest, in particular the barely credible evidence that the couple had been too preoccupied to notice that the painter was up a ladder in the same room. Lawless first became suspicious when he saw his wife and Piers walking hand in hand: he confronted his wife who broke down and confessed. Piers did not contest the action, having fled to the Isle of Man, where he remained for some years.

Lord Cloncurry's Divorce Act 1811
- Act of Parliament
- Parliament of the United Kingdom
- Long title: An Act to dissolve the Marriage of the Right Honourable Valentine Browne Lord Cloncurry with Eliza Georgiana Lady Cloncurry, his now Wife, and to enable him to marry again; and for other Purposes therein mentioned.
- Citation: 51 Geo. 3. c. 73 Pr.

Dates
- Royal assent: 26 June 1811

Lawless was awarded the then enormous sum of £20,000 in damages, although it was many years before he actually saw the money. As usual the action was the prelude to a divorce from his wife, which he obtained by a private act of Parliament, Lord Cloncurry's Divorce Act 1811 (51 Geo. 3. c. 73 Pr.). They had a son, Valentine, who died young, and a daughter, Mary, who married firstly Henry Fock, 3rd Baron De Robeck, by whom she had three children. Like her parents, her marriage ended in divorce by act of Parliament, Baron de Robeck's Divorce Act 1828 (9 Geo. 4. c. 46 Pr.). She married secondly in 1828 Lord Sussex Lennox, by whom she had three further children.

Elizabeth had a second son, born in 1807, who was generally believed to have been fathered by Sir John Piers. Lady Cloncurry was the youngest daughter of General Charles Morgan, Commander-in-Chief, India, and his wife Hannah Wagstaff, daughter of William Wagstaff of Manchester. After returning to live with her father for some years, she went to Italy, where she remarried the Rev John Sandford, the absentee vicar of Nynehead, Somerset, in 1819, and died in 1857. She and Sandford had one daughter Anna, who married Frederick Methuen, 2nd Baron Methuen.

Her former husband remarried in 1811 Emily Douglas, third daughter of Archibald Douglas and Mary Crosbie, and widow of the Hon. Joseph Leeson, by whom she was the mother of Joseph Leeson, 4th Earl of Milltown. They had three more children, including Edward, 3rd Baron Cloncurry. Emily died in 1841: her husband in his memoir paid loving tribute to their thirty years of uninterrupted happiness.

== Viceregal advisor ==
From 1811 Lawless championed Catholic Emancipation and later urged O’Connell to prioritise repeal of the Act of Union. But not wishing to compromise his friendship with Henry Paget, 1st Marquess of Anglesey, the new Lord Lieutenant, he was steadfast in not aligning himself publicly with O’Connell. After 1828 he became a member of the Anglesey's private cabinet and kept horses ready at Lyons for impromptu meetings with the viceroy both from 1828 to 1829 (when Anglesey was popular), and from 1830 to 1834 (when he was not). Dublin Castle remained suspicious, however. In 1829 Daniel O’Connell stated that the Lord Lieutenant had been recalled to London "because he visited Lord Cloncurry".

Lawless ran for parliament but remained prominent as a magistrate (he helped introduce public petty sessions in Kildare to make the legal system more accessible to the people) and as a "tithe abolitionist".

In 1831, he was created Baron Cloncurry in the Peerage of the United Kingdom, giving him an automatic seat in the House of Lords. In the House of Lords he spoke out on the "partial and oppressive" nature of forcible tithe collection for the Church of Ireland

== Death and reputation ==
His health began to fail in 1851. He died at the older family home, Maretimo House, Blackrock, on 28 October 1853, and was buried in the family vault at Lyons Hill. The title passed to his eldest surviving son Edward, who committed suicide in 1869 by throwing himself out of a third-floor window at Lyons Hill.

Daniel O'Connell, despite their frequent and bitter political differences, praised Cloncurry warmly: "In private society, in the bosom of his family, the model of virtue, in public life worthy of the admiration and affection of the people".

He was a good landlord, and worked hard to alleviate the suffering caused by the Great Hunger. He had a keen interest in law reform, and as a magistrate began the practice of holding a court of petty session, which was later established on a nationwide basis by the Petty Sessions (Ireland) Act 1851.

== Writings ==
His memoir, published in 1849, claimed: "The independence of Ireland is sure to come at last – as sure as that the Roman Empire fell in pieces, or the North American provinces are now free states. When misfortune shall overtake England, or the lot common to empires as to individuals, can she lay the flattering unction to her soul that she has acted with probity towards Ireland?"

== Bibliography ==
- Howlin, Niamh (2017). Adultery in the Courts: Damages for Criminal Conversation in Ireland. Palgrave Modern Legal History.
- Fitzpatrick, William John (1855). The life, times and cotemporaries of Lord Cloncurry. Dublin: J. Duffy. OCLC 1048308401.
- Holton, Karina (2018). Valentine Lawless, Lord Cloncurry, 1773–1853 From United Irishman to liberal politician. Dublin: Four Courts Press. ISBN 978-1-84682-705-1.
- Valentine Lawless, Personal recollections of the life and times, with extracts from the correspondence of Valentine Lord Cloncurry, Dublin: J. McGlashan; London: W.S. Orr, 1849. (Online version available)
- Linebaugh, Peter; Rediker, Marcus,The Many-Headed Hydra: Sailors, Slaves, Commoners, and the Hidden History of the Revolutionary Atlantic. Boston: Beacon Press. (2000) ISBN 978-0-8070-5007-1.
- Lyons House: A Guide. 2001.
- Malcolmson, A.P.W. (2006). The Pursuit of the Heiress- Aristocratic Marriage in Ireland 1740-1840. Ulster Historical Foundation.
- Annals of Ardclough by Eoghan Corry and Jim Tancred (2004).

Peerage of Ireland
Preceded by Nicholas Lawless	Baron Cloncurry; 1799–1853	Succeeded by Edward Lawless
Peerage of the United Kingdom
New creation	Baron Cloncurry; 1831–1853	Succeeded by Edward Lawless
