= Nicholas Lawless, 1st Baron Cloncurry =

Irish noble (1735–1799)

Nicolas Lawless, 1st Baron Cloncurry (30 October 1735 – 28 August 1799), known as Sir Nicholas Lawless, Bt, between 1776 and 1789, was an Irish peer, wool merchant, banker and politician.

Lawless was the son of Robert Lawless and Mary Hadsor, daughter of Dominick Hadsor, a Dublin merchant. He was created a Baronet, of Abington in the County of Limerick, in the Baronetage of Ireland in 1776. The same year he was returned to the Irish Parliament for Lifford, a seat he held until 1789, when he was raised to the Peerage of Ireland as Baron Cloncurry, of Cloncurry in the County of Limerick. He built an impressive residence, Maretimo House, in Blackrock, Dublin, and began work on his country house Lyons Hill, County Kildare, which was completed by his son. He had purchased the Lyons estate from the heirs of the Aylmer family.

== Marriage and succession ==
Lord Cloncurry married Margaret Browne, daughter of Valentine Browne of Mount Browne, County Limerick, in 1761. They had at least four children. One daughter, the Honourable Charlotta Louisa Lawless, married Edward Plunkett, 14th Baron Dunsany, and was the grandmother of Sir Horace Plunkett. Another daughter, the Honourable Valentina Letitia Lawless, married Sir Francis Conyngham, Lieutenant Governor of Quebec.

Lady Cloncurry died in Dublin in February 1795, aged 46. Lord Cloncurry died at Maretimo House, Blackrock, County Dublin, in August 1799, aged 63, and was succeeded in his titles by his only surviving son, Valentine. Valentine's prolonged imprisonment in the Tower of London on suspicion of treason was thought by many to have hastened his father's death.

Parliament of Ireland
Preceded by Abraham Creighton; James Cavendish	Member of Parliament for Lifford; 1776–1789; With: Abraham Creighton	Succeeded by Abraham Creighton; Edward Cooke
Baronetage of Ireland
New creation	Baronet (of Abington); 1776–1799	Succeeded by Valentine Browne Lawless
Peerage of Ireland
New creation	Baron Cloncurry; 1789–1799	Succeeded by Valentine Browne Lawless
