= Valentine Lawless, 4th Baron Cloncurry =

Irish nobleman

Valentine Lawless, 4th Baron Cloncurry (2 November 1840 – 12 February 1928) was an Irish nobleman.

Valentine was the eldest son of Edward Lawless, 3rd Baron Cloncurry, and his wife Elizabeth (née Kirwan). His sister was the noted writer and scientist Emily Lawless. Valentine was educated at Eton College and in 1861 graduated from Balliol College, Oxford with a B.A. He was appointed captain of the Kildare militia in 1860 and was High Sheriff of Kildare in 1867. He succeeded to the barony in April 1869, aged 28, after his father's suicide. Valentine married Laura Sophia Priscilla Winn, daughter of Rowland Winn, 1st Baron St Oswald on 23 January 1883; they had two daughters:

- The Hon. Mary Hermione Lawless (1886–1922)
- The Hon. Kathleen Emily Marie Lawless (1888–1957)

Laura (Baroness Cloncurry) died in 1891.

Politically, the 4th baron was a Unionist, and during the Land War (1879–82) he was chairman of the Property Defence Association, an organisation set up by landlords to oppose the Land League, which he considered an "organised combination to defraud." Fearing assassination on the winding local roads, he built the "Lord's Road", a straight road from Lyons Hill to Hazelhatch railway station.

In 1921 he attended the first meeting of the short-lived Senate of Southern Ireland.

He lived at the family seats at Lyons Castle, County Kildare; Abington, County Limerick; and "Maretimo" in Blackrock, Dublin. He died in 1928 and, as he had no sons, was succeeded by his younger brother Frederick. He was High Sheriff of Kildare in 1867.

Peerage of Ireland
Preceded by Edward Lawless	Baron Cloncurry; 1869–1928	Succeeded by Frederick Lawless
Peerage of the United Kingdom
Preceded by Edward Lawless	Baron Cloncurry; 1869–1928	Succeeded by Frederick Lawless
