= Despard Plot =

1802 conspiracy to kill King George III

Etching by Barlow (based on sketch taken at trial)

The Despard Plot was a failed 1802 conspiracy by British revolutionaries led by Colonel Edward Marcus Despard, a former army officer and colonial official. Evidence presented in court suggested that Despard planned to assassinate the monarch George III and seize key strong points in London such as the Bank of England and Tower of London as a prelude to a wider uprising by the population of the city. The British Government was aware of the plot five months before the scheduled date of attack, but waited to arrest to gain enough evidence. One week before the scheduled attack, Despard and his co-conspirators were arrested at the Oakley Arms pub in Lambeth on suspicion of plotting an uprising. Despard's execution on 21 February 1803 was attended by a crowd of around 20,000, the largest public gathering until the funeral of Lord Nelson two years later following the Battle of Trafalgar.

== The plot ==
Despard had been arrested by the Bow Street Runners on 16 November 1802 while attending a meeting of 40 working men at the Oakley Arms tavern: eight carpenters, five labourers, two shoemakers, two hatters, a stonemason, a clockmaker, a plasterer (formerly a sailor), and a wood cutter had been among the arrested. Many had been soldiers, including Despard, and several were Irishmen who had served in the Royal Navy. Furthermore, several of those arrested were Irish labourers who "had been united in Ireland", a phrase which historian Peter Linebaugh used to claim that "the mass terror of killing, torture, and deportation following the Irish Rebellion of 1798 had not extinguished the oath of the United Irish or the brotherhood of affection and communion of rights it expressed". The tavern was immediately down the road from the Albion Mills, the first London steam-powered mill which had been burned in 1791, part of the direct, anonymous resistance to the Industrial Revolution; the neighbourhood was a hotbed of continued resistance to exploitation both parliamentary and economic. An area where the government stood was referred to as "Man Eaters," and Parliament as the "Den of Thieves."

Although the plot was highly publicised, details of the trial have never been released. In 1794 the British government failed to prove that the London Corresponding Society (of which Despard was a member) was treasonous. Because of this, many of the details focused on the attempted assassination of Despard's plot, as this is what prosecutors focused on. Informers claimed that John Wood offered to post himself sentry with a cannon to fire at the King's carriage as it was going to what was then called Buckingham House. It is unlikely that Despard favoured this plan, as it was viewed as very dangerous and still hoped that men in high places, such as the politician Francis Burdett, would agree to non-regicidal changes in government. Though that may be true, evidence produced at the trial suggests that Despard did indeed consider regicide.

Sir Edward O'Brien Pryce approached authorities the day of Despard's arrest to offer evidence against Despard. Pryce claimed that, through notes, Despard had offered him unlimited sums of money in exchange for advice on making underground bombs. Despard, it was alleged, had sent him a diagram of boxes with spring locks containing three powder barrels surrounded by balls and metal spikes. These were to be buried under the road and detonated by connecting wire. Bombs were to be placed in three locations: the road to Windsor Castle, between Buckingham House and Hyde Park gate, and an exit of Buckingham House, opposite the gate into the lower part of Green Park.

Although seemingly conclusive, Pryce's evidence was not used in court; this was because the authorities wondered why he had failed to make contact with them in February when this happened. While the trial (and thus information about the plot) was mostly focused on the attempted assassination of the King, Despard and his co-conspirators also contemplated the seizure of the Bank of England and a military rising of the Third Grenadiers stationed at the Tower of London. They hoped that these attacks would set off uprisings all over the country.

== The trial ==
There was little physical evidence produced during this trial. The only pieces were printed copies of the United Englishmen's constitution which called for independence for Britain and Ireland, equal rights, and compensation for those who fall in the struggle to achieve these ideals. Although the United Englishmen's constitution was revolutionary, there was little evidence of planned regicide. The 1797 Act Against Administering Unlawful Oaths made these constitutions stronger evidence for rebellion, but not necessarily for regicide. Like the similar case of James Hadfield, another possible attempted assassin of King George III, Colonel Despard's sanity was questioned during the trial. Many of Despard's contemporaries, including Cobbett and Lord Cloncurry (who had earlier been suspected of complicity), distanced themselves from Despard's failure. The jury concluded that Despard's words had been freely given in public spaces and thus was judged as sane. Although judged sane, public society deemed Despard and his plan mad. William Cobbett commented on this distinction, "If you abhor treason, you are told Despard was a madman; if you are discontented with public affairs, you are told he was a hero."

Under the Treason Act 1795, there was little legal distinction between plotting treason and committing treason. The jury was impressed by the Colonel's character references such as that given by Evan Nepean and Horatio Nelson, who had been his companion in Honduras; the jury was also unsure about the lack of solid evidence and, consequently, Despard and his colleagues were found guilty of high treason but the jury recommended mercy.

The proposed execution raised considerable anxiety, given that it was to be in an area congested by working men (exactly the kind of man to whom Despard had appealed) and the chief magistrate, Sir Richard Ford, expressed his concern over the size of the crowds that assembled during the day and evenings near the jail. He had trouble hiring workmen to build the scaffold; the jailer feared to leave the safety of the prison; and he deployed over 100 armed soldiers throughout the neighbourhood on the night before the execution. Handbills calling on the people to rise had been distributed and the authorities feared the possibility of a riot, if not an outright attempt to free the prisoners. The prisoners remained recalcitrant, especially Despard, refusing to discuss their plans or to reveal the identities of any others who might have been involved in the plot.

A further problem for the authorities was Catherine Despard, Despard's wife, who caused considerable dismay. A woman of African descent, she had accompanied her husband from Central America to London in 1790. Active in prisoners' rights, she formed a link between her husband and the other revolutionaries with their colleagues and families outside the prison. She had worked for improvement of prison conditions, including the necessities of life: warmth, fresh air, food, space, writing materials, and access to friends and families. She was, essentially, a courier between the condemned and the outside world, and furthermore an intrepid correspondent. The prison wardens feared she was smuggling goods in and out of the prison, but feared to search her. It was she who had approached Lord Nelson to speak at the trial, and he made further applications to the government on behalf of Despard and his compatriots.

Those executed were Despard, John Francis, John Wood, James Sedgewick, Thomas Broughton, Arthur Graham, and John Macnamara. They were executed in Old Horsemonger Lane Gaol in Southwark on Monday 21 February 1803.

== Legacy ==
In his seminal The Making of the English Working Class (1963), E. P. Thompson identified the Despard affair as "an incident of real significance in British political history". It appeared to "justify the Government's policy of 'alarm' and of the suspension of popular liberties". At the same time, for Jacobin ultras it initiated "the strategy (or, perhaps, fantasy) of the coup d'etat" that was to issue in the Cato Street Conspiracy of 1820.

== See also ==
- Robert Emmet

== Bibliography ==
- Conner, Clifford D., Colonel Despard: The Life and Times of an Anglo-Irish Rebel Combined Publishing 2000.
- Elliott, Marianne. (1977). The "Despard Conspiracy" Reconsidered. Past & Present, (75), 46–61. Retrieved from Jstor.
- Jay, Mike. The Unfortunate Colonel Despard. Bantam Press, 2005.
- Linebaugh, Peter, and Marcus Rediker, The Many-Headed Hydra: Sailors, Slaves, Commoners, and the Hidden History of the Revolutionary Atlantic, Beacon Press, 2013.
- Porter, B. (1989). Plots and paranoia: A history of political espionage in Britain, 1790–1988. London; Boston: Unwin Hyman.
- Poole, S. (2000). The politics of regicide in England, 1760–1850: Troublesome subjects. Manchester : New York: Manchester University Press,.
- Smith, A. W.. (1955). Irish Rebels and English Radicals 1798–1820. Past & Present, (7), 78–85. Retrieved from JSTOR.
- Walsh, P. V.. (2000). "Review of Colonel Despard: The Life and Times of an Anglo-Irish Rebel". The Journal of Military History, 64(4), 1153–1154.
