= Gaspare Gabrielli =

Italian painter (1770–1828)

Gaspare Gabrielli (1770–1828) was an Italian painter, active in painting land- and sea-scapes in a Neoclassical style. He worked for many years in Dublin, Ireland. He was a key witness in the Cloncurry adultery case in 1807, where he gave compelling evidence of Lady Cloncurry's affair with Sir John Piers.

== History ==
Gabrielli was recruited to work in Ireland by Baron Cloncurry in 1805 to decorate the family's country house, now titled Lyons Demesne in County Kildare. The Baron also imported shiploads of classical treasures from Italy.

Gabrielli's stay at Lyons was not without romance or controversy. The romance was that Gabrielli married Lady Cloncurry's maid; the controversy was that he was called as a witness in a highly publicized adultery trial in 1807 by Baron Valentine Cloncurry against Sir John Bennett Piers, 6th Baronet, for having carried an affair with Lady Georgiana Cloncurry in full view of Gabrielli as he worked on his frescoes. The painted decorations in the house are "The Bay of Dublin" (dining-room) and "Views of Herculaneum" in panels in the small drawing-room.

Gabrielli also frescoed at Tandragee Castle for Lady Olivia Sparrow, and in the drawing-room of No. 41 North Great George's Street. In Cromwell's Excursions through Ireland, published in 1820, are two plates from drawings by Gabrielli: "Carlow Castle" and "Drimnagh Castle". In Dublin, Gabrielli was active as a landscape painter, participating in various exhibitions between 1809 and 1814, and serving as vice-president of the Society of Artists of Ireland in 1811.

In 1819, he returned to Italy, and while he sent some pictures back to Ireland, he does not appear to have returned.
