= Aimsir =

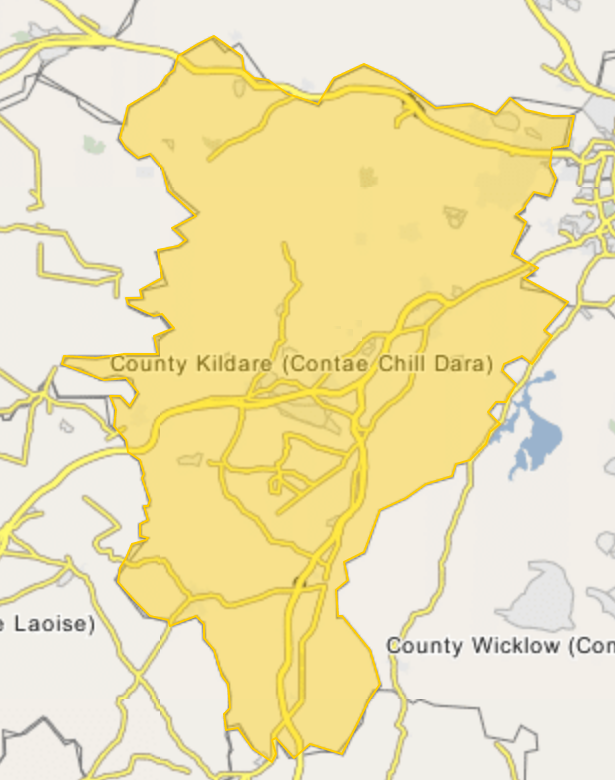
- Location within County Kildare Location within Ireland

Restaurant information
- Established: May 2019
- Food type: Irish cuisine
- Location: Lyons Demesne, Celbridge, County Kildare, W23 F8KP, Ireland
- Coordinates: 53°18′23″N 6°32′32″W
- Seating capacity: 24
- Website: aimsir.ie

Aimsir (Irish: [ˈamʲʃəɾʲ], "weather, season") was a fine-dining restaurant in County Kildare, Ireland. Located in Lyons Demesne next to Aylmer Bridge on the Grand Canal, Aimsir opened in 2019 with Jordan Bailey, formerly of Maaemo, as head chef and his wife Majken Bech as manager.

The restaurant was awarded two Michelin stars in its first year, then one of only four Irish restaurants to have received this accolade. The restaurant retained its Michelin stars between 2020 and 2023, but lost them in the 2024 version of the guide following Bailey's departure as head chef. The restaurant closed in January 2025.

== Awards ==
- Michelin Guide: Two stars (2020, 2021, 2022, 2023)

== See also ==
- List of Michelin-starred restaurants in Ireland
