= Kerri McLean =

British actress and director

- Occupation: Actress, director
- Years active: 2004–present

Kerri McLean is a British actress and director. She is best known for playing Kitty Despard in the drama series Poldark and Maeve in the comedy thriller Bodkin.

== Early life ==
McLean was born in Birmingham, England. She graduated from the Mason Science College in Birmingham with A-Levels in Performing Arts, Media Studies and Art, before moving onto study Modern Drama Studies at Brunel University of London. Eight years after earning her degree, McLean began studying Audio Production at the University of Westminster, from where she graduated with a Masters Degree in 2009.

== Career ==
McLean made her on-screen debut in 2004 on an episode of the soap opera Eastenders. Other early roles included minor appearances in shows such as Holby City, Casualty and Small Island. She played a police officer in the fantasy series A Discovery of Witches. Her first big role came playing former slave Catherine Despard in the historical drama series Poldark. McLean has had also had a very successful directing career. She directed Formula 1 title and promo films for 4 years for worldwide broadcast, featuring all of F1’s drivers and key principles including Lewis Hamilton, Daniel Ricciardo, Sebastian Vettel. Her film ‘Reality Check’ won Faith Drama’s ‘Writer-Director Festival Award’ and ‘Writer/Director Audience Choice Award’ in 2016. Kerri played lead character barrister Tamika Dazinzi in the 2022 audio film Barred which won a silver award for ‘Best Director’ and a bronze award for ‘Best Digital Drama’ at The New York Festival’s Radio Awards 2022. She portrayed Maeve, one of the lead roles of the Irish thriller series Bodkin.

== Filmography ==
=== Film ===
Year	Title	Role	Notes
2005	Cherished	Young Lifer 3	
2016	We Love Moses	Janet	Short
2017	The Ritual	Gayle	
2019	Bruno	DC Richardson	
2021	Tom and Jerry	News Reporter	
2022	Blinkers	Daisy	Short
2025	Brighton Storeys	Eve The Midwife	
2026	Molly vs the Machines	Michelle Walker	

=== Television ===
Year	Title	Role	Notes
2004	Eastenders	Jemma	Episode; 2667
2004	Holby City	Rachel Dennis	2 episodes
2007	Casualty	Danni Wilson	Episode; The Killing Floor
2009	Small Island	Josephine	Episode; #1.2
2010	Identity	Teacher	Episode; Second Life
2014	Hollyoaks	Dr. Lewis	Episode; 3971
2015	Unforgotten	Duty Solicitor	2 episodes
2003-2016	Doctors	DC Gemma Beckett, Tracey Maduro, Megan WallerUnforgotten	9 episodes
2017	Rellik	Paramedic	Episode; #1.4
2017	Electric Dreams	Implanted Jill#2	Episode; Crazy Diamond
2017	Bounty Hunters	Stewardess	Episode; #1.3
2018	Bliss	Midwife	Episode; #1.3
2018	A Discovery of Witches	Female Police Officer	Episode; #1.1
2018	Bodyguard	Surveillance Officer	2 episodes
2019	Poldark	Kitty Despard	7 episodes
2021	Line of Duty	Midwife	Episode; #6.3
2024	Bodkin	Maeve	5 episodes
2025	The Rig	Surveillance Officer	Episode; #2.3
2026	Grace	Carla Lambert	Episode; One Of Us is Dead

=== Video Games ===
Year	Title	Role	Notes
2022	Expeditions: Rome	Lunja, Cecilia, Nasamones Soldier Female	
2023	Baldur's Gate 3	Cappa Delourese, Fist Oriona, Raider G'r'ath	
2024	Unknown 9: Awakening	Voice	
