= De Robeck =

Baron de Robeck's Naturalization Act 1789
- Act of Parliament
- Parliament of Great Britain
- Long title: An Act for naturalizing John Henry Fock, called Baron de Robeck.
- Citation: 29 Geo. 3. c. 62 Pr.
- Territorial extent: Great Britain

Dates
- Royal assent: 13 July 1789
- Commencement: 20 November 1788 (Note: Start of session.)

Status: Current legislation

Baron de Robeck is a title of the head of the Irish Fock family which has its origins in Sweden. Jakob Constantin Fock, a Swedish landowner, had bought the Räbäck estate in the parish of Medelplana, Skaraborg County in the province of Västergötland, and after serving as the acting governor there three times, he was created a friherre in 1778 by King Gustav III. His son Johan Henrik, after fighting in the American War of Independence, moved to England and was naturalised as a British subject under the name "John Henry Fock, called Baron de Robeck", by an act of the British Parliament, Baron de Robeck's Naturalization Act 1789 (29 Geo. 3. c. 62 Pr.), in 1789.

Baron de Robeck's Divorce Act 1828
- Act of Parliament
- Parliament of Great Britain
- Long title: An Act to dissolve the Marriage of John Michael Henry Fock Baron De Robeck with Mary Margaret Baroness De Robeck his now Wife, and to enable him to marry again; and for other Purposes therein mentioned.
- Citation: 9 Geo. 4. c. 46 Pr.

Dates
- Royal assent: 21 March 1828

His son (John Michael) Henry, the 3rd Baron, lived in Ireland and was appointed High Sheriff of Kildare for 1834, High Sheriff of County Dublin for 1838 and High Sheriff of Wicklow for 1839. His marriage in 1820 to the Hon. Mary Lawless, daughter of Valentine Lawless, 2nd Baron Cloncurry and Elizabeth Morgan, became a subject of much gossip when she divorced him by the Baron de Robeck's Divorce Act 1828 (9 Geo. 4. c. 46 Pr.) to marry Lord Sussex Lennox (her parents had also divorced). The 4th Baron, John Henry, Master of the Kildare Hunt, served as High Sheriff for 1859, Deputy Lieutenant and justice of the peace for County Kildare and also as High Sheriff of Wicklow for 1884. He built Gowran Grange in Swordlestown in 1857 as a family seat. The 5th Baron, Henry Edward, was Master of the Kildare Hunt, a justice of the peace and Deputy Lieutenant. His younger brother was Admiral of the Fleet Sir John de Robeck, 1st Baronet, commander of the Allied naval force in the Dardanelles during World War I. The 6th Baron, Brigadier John Henry Edward, was a British Army artillery officer in both World Wars. The 7th baron, Martin, was chairman of Punchestown Racecourse along with many others. The current Baron is Charles John Martin.

== Barons de Robeck ==
Fock family members who have used the title Baron de Robeck

- Baron Jakob Constantin Fock (1724–1803)
- Johan Henrik Fock, 2nd Baron de Robeck (1753–1817)
- John Michael Henry Fock, 3rd Baron de Robeck (c. 1790 – 1856)
- John Henry Edward Fock, 4th Baron de Robeck (1823–1904)
- Henry Edward William Fock, 5th Baron Robeck (1859–1929)
- John Henry Edward Fock, 6th Baron Robeck (1895–1965)
- Martin John Michael Fock, 7th Baron de Robeck (1941–1996)
- Charles John Martin Fock, 8th Baron de Robeck (born 1973)

== Bibliography ==
- "The de Robecks of Gowran Grange, Co. Kildare".
