= Catherine Despard =

Jamaican activist (d. 1815)

Catherine Despard (died 1815), from Jamaica, publicised political detentions and prison conditions in London where her Irish husband, Colonel Edward Despard, was repeatedly incarcerated for their shared democratic convictions. Her extensive lobbying failed to save him from the gallows when, in 1803, he was tried and convicted for a plot to assassinate King George III.

== Jamaica ==
Catherine Despard's origins in the Caribbean have been unclear. Some propose that she was an educated Spanish Creole, and that she met Edward Despard when, from 1786, he was Superintendent of the British logwood concessions in the Bay of Honduras Evidence has emerged, however, that she was the daughter of Sarah Gordon, a free woman of colour in the parish of St. Andrew's in Kingston, Jamaica.

In a will of May 1799 and probated in August, Gordon bequeathed four slaves (three adults and a child) to "my dear daughter Catherine Gordon Despard now in London". It is not known how Despard might have disposed of this inheritance.

Edward Despard had been posted with his regiment to Jamaica from Ireland in 1766/67. He rose in the ranks as a defence-works engineer, before leading troops against the Spanish Main in 1780 and 1782.

== Campaigning in London ==
Edward Despard was recalled from the Bay of Honduras to London in 1790 after the established white loggers and planters complained that he was stirring up free blacks, otherwise content to be servants, with a "wild and Levelling principle of Universal Equality". As Superintendent he had parcelled out and distributed land in the Bay to men displaced by the Spanish repossession of the Mosquito Coast without regard to rank or colour.

When Catherine and Edward arrived in London, together with their young son, James, it was as husband and wife. Despite the political furore created by Edward's increasing radicalism—his membership of the London Corresponding Society (LCS) and the United Irishmen—and subsequent arrests, the marriage was never publicly questioned by the authorities.

Pursued with lawsuits by his enemies in the Bay, Edward Despard was confined for two years without charge in King's Bench Prison. In March 1798, with other LCS figures and United Irishmen, he was arrested again and detained in Coldbath Fields Prison under a wartime suspension of habeas corpus. Catherine Despard publicly campaigned against the conditions her husband was subjected to in prison, attracting the support of the proponent of prison reform Francis Burdett. She wrote to the Home Secretary (the Duke of Portland), to William Wickham who under Portland had orchestrated the arrests, and to various London newspapers detailing the poor conditions in the prison.

Thanks in part to her efforts, her husband's imprisonment became the focus of a three-week debate in the House of Commons over whether to extend the suspension of habeas corpus. A letter from Catherine was read on the floor of the chamber by MP John Courtenay detailing the harsh conditions of his confinement. Despite her efforts, Edward Despard remained in prison for three years. He was released in May 1801.

In what may have been "a marker of the more fluid and tolerant character of racial attitudes in the Age of Reform", when seeking to discredit Catherine's articulate intercessions on her husband's behalf, government thought it sufficient to observe that she was of the "fair sex". In response to Courtenay, the attorney general Sir John Scott, suggested that Catherine was being used as a mouthpiece by political subversives: "it was a well-written letter, and the fair sex would pardon him, if he said it was a little beyond their style in general".

After a year of liberty that she and Edward spent largely in Ireland, in 1802 her husband was arrested. He was charged with treason as the alleged ringleader of a plot involving disaffected soldiers and labourers, many of them Irish, to assassinate the King and seize the Tower of London—the so-called Despard Plot. He denied the charges, but in February 1803 he was sentenced, with six others, to be hung, drawn and quartered.

Catherine persisted in a campaign on her husband's behalf, lobbying the Prime Minister and petitioning the King. She succeeded in having the then already archaic rites of disembowelment and dismemberment waived. But having hoped for a commutation, Catherine was reported as "almost sunk under the anticipated horror of his fate."

Despard visited her husband in prison where she was suspected of bringing in contraband and seditious materials to him and the other arrested rebels. She may have helped compose the speech Edward Despard gave at the gallows in which he protested that his only guilt was to be a "friend to the poor and to the oppressed".

== After the execution ==
After her husband's execution, there was a report that she had been "taken under the protection of Lady Nelson". As Edward's former comrade-in-arms in the Caribbean, Lord Nelson had stood as a character witness for her husband during his trial. Sir Francis Burdett provided Catherine Despard a pension, and she spent some time in Ireland, a guest of Valentine Lawless who had been arrested with Despard in 1798. She died in Somers Town, London in 1815.

== In popular culture ==
She is portrayed by Kerri McLean in the fifth series of Poldark.
