= King Frankie =

2024 Irish film

- Theatrical film poster
- Directed by: Dermot Malone
- Written by: Dermot Malone
- Produced by: Matt D'Arcy
- Starring: Peter Coonan; Olivia Caffrey; Ruairi O'Connor; Ally Ni Chiarain
- Cinematography: Luke Jacobs
- Edited by: Rob Hegarty
- Music by: Michael MacLennan
- Release dates: February 24, 2024 (Dublin); October 11, 2024 (Ireland)
- Running time: 95 mins.
- Country: Ireland
- Language: English

King Frankie is a 2024 Irish drama film, directed and written by Dermot Malone. It stars Peter Coonan, Olivia Caffrey, Ruairi O'Connor, Rob Malone, Ally Ni Chiarain, Conor MacNeill, Owen Roe, and Rejjie Snow. It premiered at the Dublin International Film Festival in 2024, before being released throughout Ireland later that year.

== Synopsis ==
The past catches up with Dublin taxi driver Frank Burke after his father's death.

== Cast ==
- Peter Coonan as Frankie Burke
- Olivia Caffrey as Jenny
- Ruairi O'Connor as Fraser
- Ally Ni Chiarain as Mary
- Owen Roe as Aidan
- Conor MacNeill as Jeffrey
- Rob Malone as Cathal
- Lynn Rafferty as Sarah
- Rejjie Snow as Syl
- Rebecca Hickey as Siobhan
- Ger Kelly as Carl

== Reception ==
Allan Hunter of Screen Daily praised writer/director Dermot Malone, who "shows considerable promise" in his feature film debut. Bren Murphy of RTÉ was also impressed and said the film is "beautifully shot". Chris Wasser of the Irish Independent lauded lead actor Peter Coonan as "terrific", although felt that "it would be better without all the flashbacks". In contrast, Dr. Bob Mann of One Mann's Movies opined that "the progression of the story was rather predictable".
