= Baron Cloncurry =

Extinct barony in the Peerage of the United Kingdom

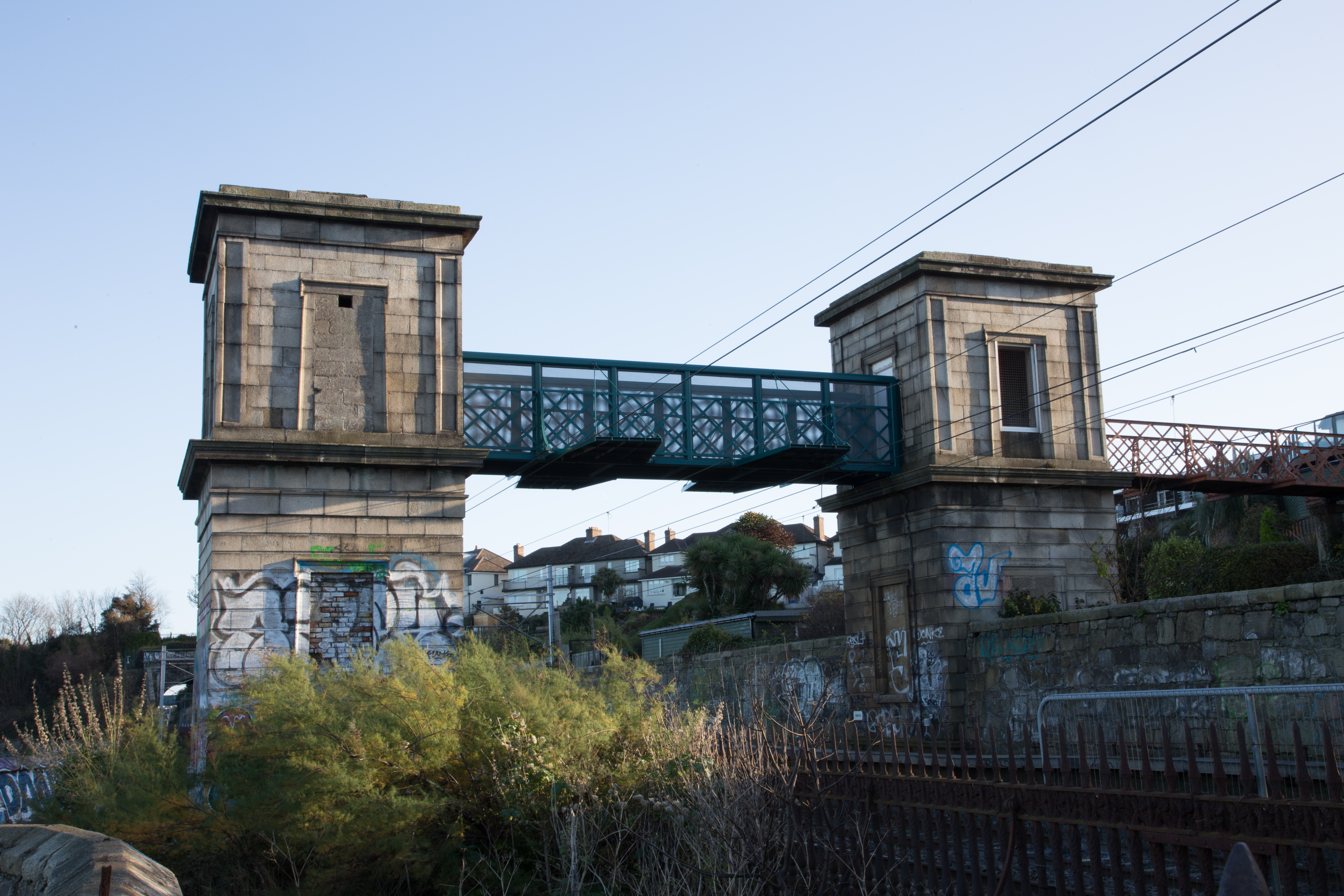
Lord Cloncurry's bridge, near Blackrock, Dublin, named after the 3rd Baron

Baron Cloncurry, of Cloncurry in the County of Kildare, was a title in the Peerage of Ireland. It was created on 29 December 1789 for Sir Nicholas Lawless, 1st Baronet, who had earlier represented Lifford in the Irish House of Commons. He had already been created a Baronet, of Abington in the County of Limerick, in the Baronetage of Ireland on 6 August 1776. He was succeeded by his son, the second Baron. On 14 September 1831 he was created Baron Cloncurry, of Cloncurry in the County of Kildare, in the Peerage of the United Kingdom. He had divorced his first wife, Elizabeth Georgiana Morgan, in 1811 after a particularly scandalous lawsuit, on the ground of her adultery with Sir John Piers, 6th Baronet.

The 3rd Baron committed suicide in 1869 by jumping from the third floor of his house, Lyons Place. The titles descended from father to son until the death of the fourth Baron, in 1928. The late Baron was succeeded by his younger brother, the fifth Baron. He was unmarried and the titles became extinct on his death on 18 July 1929.

== Barons Cloncurry (1789) ==
- Nicholas Lawless, 1st Baron Cloncurry (1735–1799)
- Valentine Browne Lawless, 2nd Baron Cloncurry (1773–1853)
- Edward Lawless, 3rd Baron Cloncurry (1816–1869)
- Valentine Lawless, 4th Baron Cloncurry (1840–1928)
- Frederick Lawless, 5th Baron Cloncurry (1847–1929)
