= Bodkin (TV series) =

2024 television series

- Genre: Black comedy; Mystery thriller
- Created by: Jez Scharf
- Starring: Will Forte; Siobhán Cullen; Robyn Cara; David Wilmot; Chris Walley
- Countries of origin: United States; Ireland
- Original language: English
- No. of seasons: 1
- No. of episodes: 7

Production
- Executive producers: Jez Scharf; Alex Metcalf; Tonia Davis; David Flynn; Paul Lee; Nne Ebong
- Running time: 44–56 minutes
- Production companies: Higher Ground; wiip

Original release
- Network: Netflix
- Release: 9 May 2024

Bodkin is a black comedy thriller television series, consisting of seven episodes, created by British writer Jez Scharf. It premiered on Netflix on 9 May 2024.

== Premise ==
Gilbert Power, an American podcaster, travels to Bodkin, an Irish coastal town, to investigate a cold case involving the disappearance of three people during a Samhain celebration several decades prior. He is joined by Dublin-born Dubheasa "Dove" Maloney – an investigative journalist in London who is sent on assignment after the death of her source, a government whistleblower – and Emmy Sizergh, an aspiring journalist.

== Cast ==
- Will Forte as Gilbert Power, an American podcaster
- Siobhán Cullen as Dubheasa "Dove" Maloney, an Irish investigative journalist
- Robyn Cara as Emmy Sizergh, Gilbert's researcher
- David Wilmot as Seamus Gallagher
- Chris Walley as Sean O'Shea
- Seán Óg Cairns as Garda Eoin
- Pom Boyd as Mrs. O'Shea
- Ger Kelly as Teddy
- Charlie Kemp as Damien
- Kerri McLean as Maeve
- David Pearse as Frank
- Amy Conroy as Fagan
- Denis Conway as Sergeant Power
- Charlie Kelly as Fintan
- Peter Bankolé as Charles
- Sabine Timoteo as Annika
- Fionnula Flanagan as Mother Bernadette
- Pat Shortt as Darragh
- Clodagh Mooney Duggan as Mary Donovan
- Pauline McLynn as Brónagh McArdle
- Ahna O'Reilly as Amber Power, Gilbert's wife

== Episodes ==
No.	Title	Directed by	Written by	Original release date
1	"One True Mystery"	Nash Edgerton	Jez Scharf	9 May 2024
Dove, an Irish journalist for The Guardian based in London, discovers that Krtek, the main source for her latest published story, has killed himself. The story, which exposes a data breach in the NHS, has led to legal troubles for Dove and the newspaper. Her boss sends her to the small town of Bodkin in West Cork, Ireland to assist American podcaster Gilbert Power and his English researcher, Emmy Sizergh. Gilbert wants to do a series on an infamous incident that occurred 25 years ago, when three people disappeared during Samhain. The team visits the hollow where the festival used to be held and meets the land's owner, Darragh. The podcasters find that the Bodkin citizens aren't eager to talk about anything related to the disappearances. The serious Dove clashes with the optimistic Gilbert and naive Emmy over the podcast's light tone. Gilbert and Emmy interview Police Sergeant Power (whose family name is coincidentally the same as Gilbert's), but he is not very helpful. Unbeknownst to Gilbert, Emmy stole a file from Sgt Power's office, which reveals that one of the missing people, the boy Edward P., was found three days after Samhain ended by a nun named Sister McDonagh. Meanwhile, Dove is chased down by a car and threatened by two people wearing balaclavas. Unknown persons set fire to driver Sean O'Shea's car.
2	"Who We Are"	Nash Edgerton	Alex Metcalf	9 May 2024
After she's threatened Dove starts to believe that there's a bigger story in Bodkin than she assumed. After flaking on his duties, Sean turns up and seems unbothered by his burnt car. The team goes to a convent to interview Sister McDonagh, who explains that Edward still lives in Bodkin and is nicknamed Teddy. The team locates Teddy and tries to ask the quiet man questions, but his father, Sergeant Power, kicks them off the property. Dove and Emmy search the library archives and find a picture of Malachy, another of the missing people. Dove recognizes another man in the photo who goes by Seamus Gallagher. Dove believes Seamus is actually a notorious smuggler-in-hiding named Jack "the Badger" McFadden. Darragh is found dead with a bleeding head. Gilbert has financial troubles and owes €8,000 to Frank, a thug from a bohemian community on the edge of town. Dove may face charges under the Official Secrets Act for her NHS story.
3	"Perfectly Innocent Life"	Bronwen Hughes	Ursula Rani Sarma	9 May 2024
Darragh's death is ruled an accident. At the wake, Gilbert learns that Darragh was in love with Malachy, but the feeling wasn't mutual. Darragh rented his land to Malachy for a cheap price. After he disappeared, Malachy's brother, Seamus, took over the lease. The mortician, Mary, flirts with Dove at the wake. Dove learns that the Home Office are formally investigating her. She breaks into Seamus's house and finds a photo that indicates he was in a relationship with Fiona, the third person who went missing. Dove speculates that Malachy stole Fiona from Seamus, so he killed them. Emmy interviews tech entrepreneur Fintan, who claims that, during the Samhain disappearances, he was high on mushrooms, heard a car crash, and saw the legendary Jackie Lantern rise from a bog. A drunken Gilbert tells Dove about his personal troubles to which she can relate. The next day, Gilbert interviews Seamus, who says he loved Fiona, and he misses her and Malachy. Dove and Emmy use satellite images to find a car in the bog that Fintan mentioned. After the car is pulled from the water, they find two bodies in the trunk.
4	"Poison or Something"	Bronwen Hughes	Megan Mostyn-Brown	9 May 2024
Gilbert, Dove, and Emmy discover that Seamus and Sean are selling eels on the black market, and the masked people who threatened Dove are Interpol agents investigating Seamus’s operation. Sergeant Power claims the criminal McArdle brothers are the murderers, despite never being charged. Dove breaks into the car pulled from the bog and finds a knife that bears Teddy’s mark. Emmy convinces Fintan to talk to Teddy about it, and Dove pressures her to record the conversation. Teddy tells Fintan that the knife was a gift to Sergeant Power, who kept it in his car. Later, Fintan is upset to discover Emmy recorded him. Seamus offers to pay Gilbert’s debt if Seamus is not mentioned in the podcast, to which he agrees. Seamus and Sean meet with the Interpol agents, who pose as buyers. Seamus pays Frank, but he makes a cruel joke and Seamus attacks him. Gilbert offers to show the distraught Seamus the bodies. They sneak into the morgue, where Seamus recognizes a sixth toe on Malachy’s foot, but realizes the female isn’t Fiona because she wore dentures on her front teeth, but this woman's teeth are real.
5	"Peace in Our Time"	Johnny Allan	Oneika Barrett	9 May 2024
When Seamus and Malachy were smugglers, they were the archrivals of the McArdle brothers. Seamus and Gilbert visit Brónagh McArdle, but she has no knowledge of the murders. Dove accidentally reveals to Seamus that the bog car belongs to Sergeant Power. Meanwhile, Sgt Power is in the hospital after getting a heart attack when Dove confronts him with her suspicions. The Sergeant tells Seamus that he was helping Malachy and Fiona escape the McArdles, but after they disappeared, he assumed the McArdles were responsible. Gilbert warns Seamus about the Interpol agents. Later, Sgt Power tells Dove that he found Teddy holding a bloody brick over Malachy’s body and while driving to hide the corpse, he accidentally hit a woman from the bohemian community with his car and had to dispose of her as well. Emmy and Fintan make up, and he encourages her to stand up to Dove. Emmy inspects the woman's body and finds a bracelet labeled “Greta.” While reviewing an interview, Emmy hears the bohemian Maeve mention a friend named Greta. Gilbert, Emmy, and Dove search Maeve’s trailer and discover Fiona was pregnant. Meanwhile, someone locks Seamus inside his boat and sets it ablaze.
6	"Ends Justify Means"	Bronwen Hughes	Mike O'Leary	9 May 2024
Dove discovers that Mrs. O’Shea was a nun in the same order as Sister McDonagh. Gilbert’s wife, Amber, travels to Bodkin and convinces him to sign their divorce papers. Dove and Emmy go to the convent, where Dove is unknowingly dosed with psychedelic mushrooms by the Sister Bernadette. Dove has a bad trip, which revives traumatic memories. The sickly McDonagh tells Dove that Fiona came to the convent to have her baby and that she is still there. Maeve confesses to Gilbert that she helped Fiona flee to the convent and she was the one who also struck Teddy on the head because she mistook him for Seamus. Emmy, Dove, and Gilbert meet at the apiary and find Fiona's grave. They are told by Maeve and Bernadette that Fiona and her baby died in childbirth. The police arrive to extradite Dove to London. Emmy theorizes that Fiona’s baby survived and is Sean O'Shea. Meanwhile, Seamus escaped the boat fire and decides to sell his eels and leave town but discovers that Sean has stolen all the eels.
7	"Empty Your Pockets"	Paddy Breathnach	Teleplay by : Paddy Campbell; Story by : Jez Scharf	9 May 2024
Dove reveals to Gilbert that, as a child, she was abandoned by her addict mother. Dove offers to help Interpol arrest Seamus in exchange for leniency. The McArdles search for Seamus, and Dove can’t dissuade him from leaving town. Mrs. O’Shea confirms to Gilbert and Emmy that Sean is the son of Fiona and Seamus. She burned Sean’s car to try to scare away the podcasters and had Maeve burn Seamus’s boat. Hoping for a compelling end to the podcast, Gilbert tells Seamus that Sean is his son. Seamus tries to reconnect with Sean but is rejected. Interpol attempts to arrest Seamus, so he takes Gilbert hostage. Seamus ties up Gilbert in an underground hideout, sets a bomb, and leaves. Meanwhile, a Samhain rave is taking place on the land directly overhead. Dove and Emmy find Gilbert and free him. Emmy and Teddy evacuate the rave, while Dove urges Seamus to surrender to Interpol but he detonates the bomb instead; his fate is left unclear. Luckily, no one is injured in the blast. Later Gilbert decides to not publish the podcast, Emmy gets a job as a reporter, and Dove returns to the convent where she was a foster child, seeking to heal emotional wounds.

== Production ==
Referred to as both Bodkin and On Record, the seven-episode series is created by Jez Scharf as Higher Ground's first scripted series at Netflix, in collaboration with wiip. Scharf and Alex Metcalf serve as co-showrunners and executive produce the series with Tonia Davis for Higher Ground, David Flynn and Paul Lee for wiip, and Nne Ebong. Nash Edgerton, Bronwen Hughes, Johnny Allan and Paddy Breathnach served as directors, while Mike O'Leary joined the writing room.

In June 2022, it was announced Will Forte would lead the series alongside Siobhán Cullen, Robyn Cara, David Wilmot, and Chris Walley.

Principal photography began in West Cork in summer 2022, and took six months. Other filming locations included Wicklow and Dublin.

== Reception ==
On the review aggregator website Rotten Tomatoes, 68% of 40 critics' reviews are positive, with an average rating of 6.3/10. The website's consensus reads: "Bodkin's satire of true crime investigation could use a more compelling mystery to hang its quips on, but the series' sheer eccentricity makes for an intriguing enough tale from the old sod." Metacritic, which uses a weighted average, assigned the film a score of 59 out of 100, based on 18 critics, indicating "mixed or average" reviews.
