= Ipswich (suburb), Queensland =

Ipswich Ipswich, Queensland
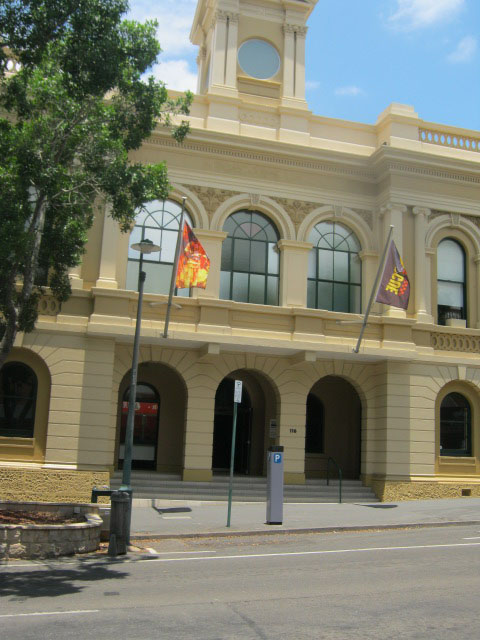
- Ipswich Town Hall, 2012

- Coordinates: 27.6144°S 152.7608°E
- Population: 2,468 (2021 census)
  - Density: 588/km^{2} (1,522/sq mi)
- Established: 1843
- Postcode(s): 4305
- Elevation: 40 m (131 ft)
- Area: 4.2 km^{2} (1.6 sq mi)
- Time zone: AEST (UTC+10:00)
- Location: 39 km (24 mi) SW of Brisbane; 80 km (50 mi) E of Toowoomba
- LGA(s): City of Ipswich
- State electorate(s): Ipswich
- Federal division(s): Blair
Suburbs around Ipswich:
Woodend	North Ipswich	East Ipswich
West Ipswich	Ipswich	Newtown; Eastern Heights
One Mile	Churchill	Raceview

Ipswich Central (/ˈɪpswɪtʃ/) is the central suburb of Ipswich in the City of Ipswich, Queensland, Australia. In the 2021 census, Ipswich had a population of 2,468 people.

== Geography ==
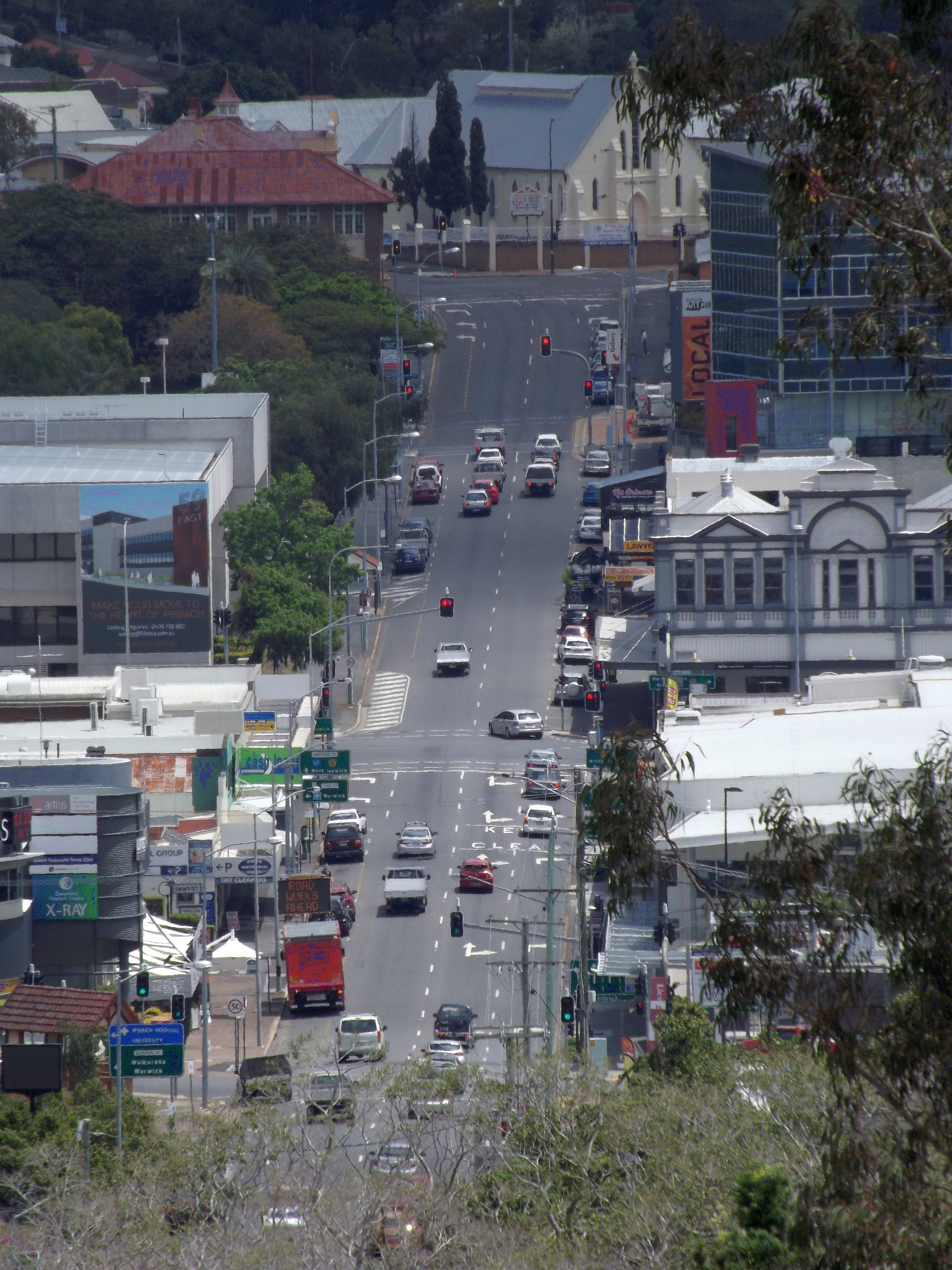
Limestone Street, 2015

The suburb is situated on the Bremer River.

The suburb of Ipswich has a number of distinct areas. The Ipswich central business district is in the north with the Bremer River forming the northern boundary. Limestone Hill and its parklands are to the east (27°37′01″S 152°46′09″E). Denmark Hill with its exclusive residential area and conservation park is to the west (27°37′09″S 152°45′14″E). A mixture of health, educations and residential areas make up the south.

The Ipswich CBD is centred on Brisbane and Limestone Streets, and the Ipswich Mall, and includes major supermarkets and chain stores, specialties stores and the many government agencies. Most street parking is controlled by parking meters in business hours.

== History ==
In 1860 a Baptist Church opened in Ipswich. On Monday 11 December 1876 a foundation stone was laid for a new Baptist church building, which opened about 19 June 1877.

Ipswich Girls Grammar School opened on 1 February 1892.

== Demographics ==
In the 2016 census, Ipswich had a population of 2,459 people.

In the 2021 census, Ipswich had a population of 2,468 people.

== Heritage listings ==
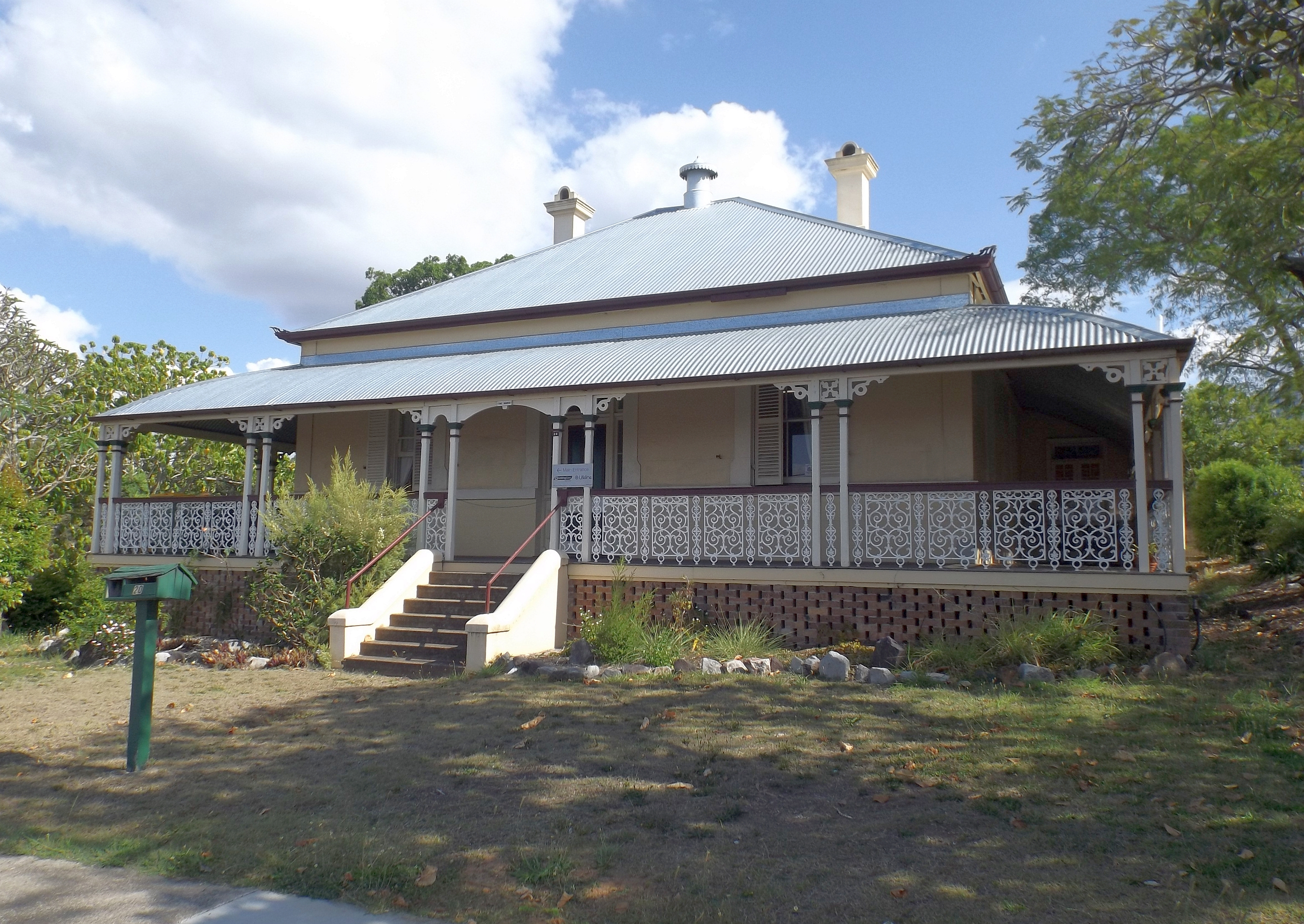
Keiraville is a typical late 19th century detached house

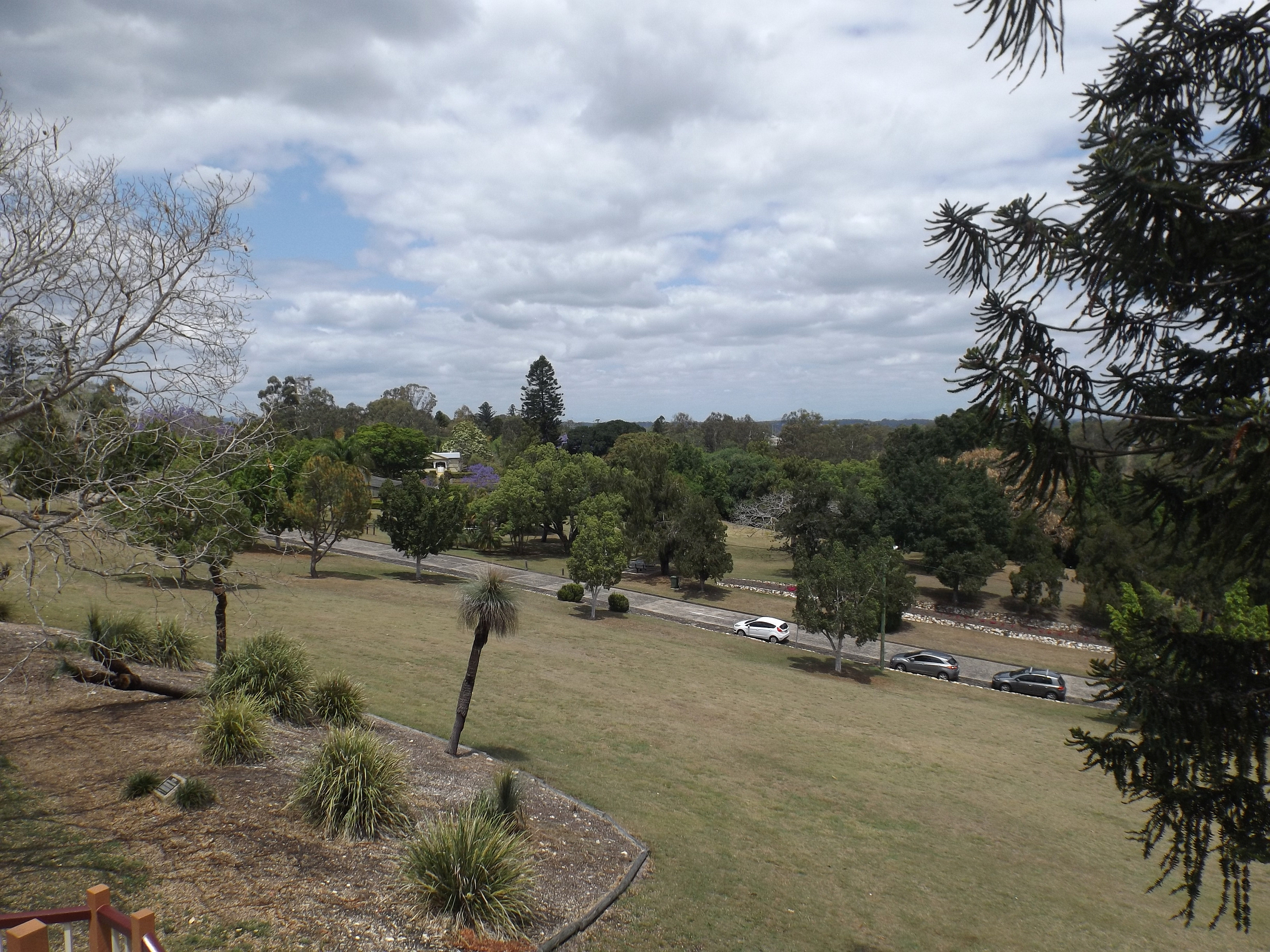
View across Queens Park from Limestone Hill Lookout, 2015

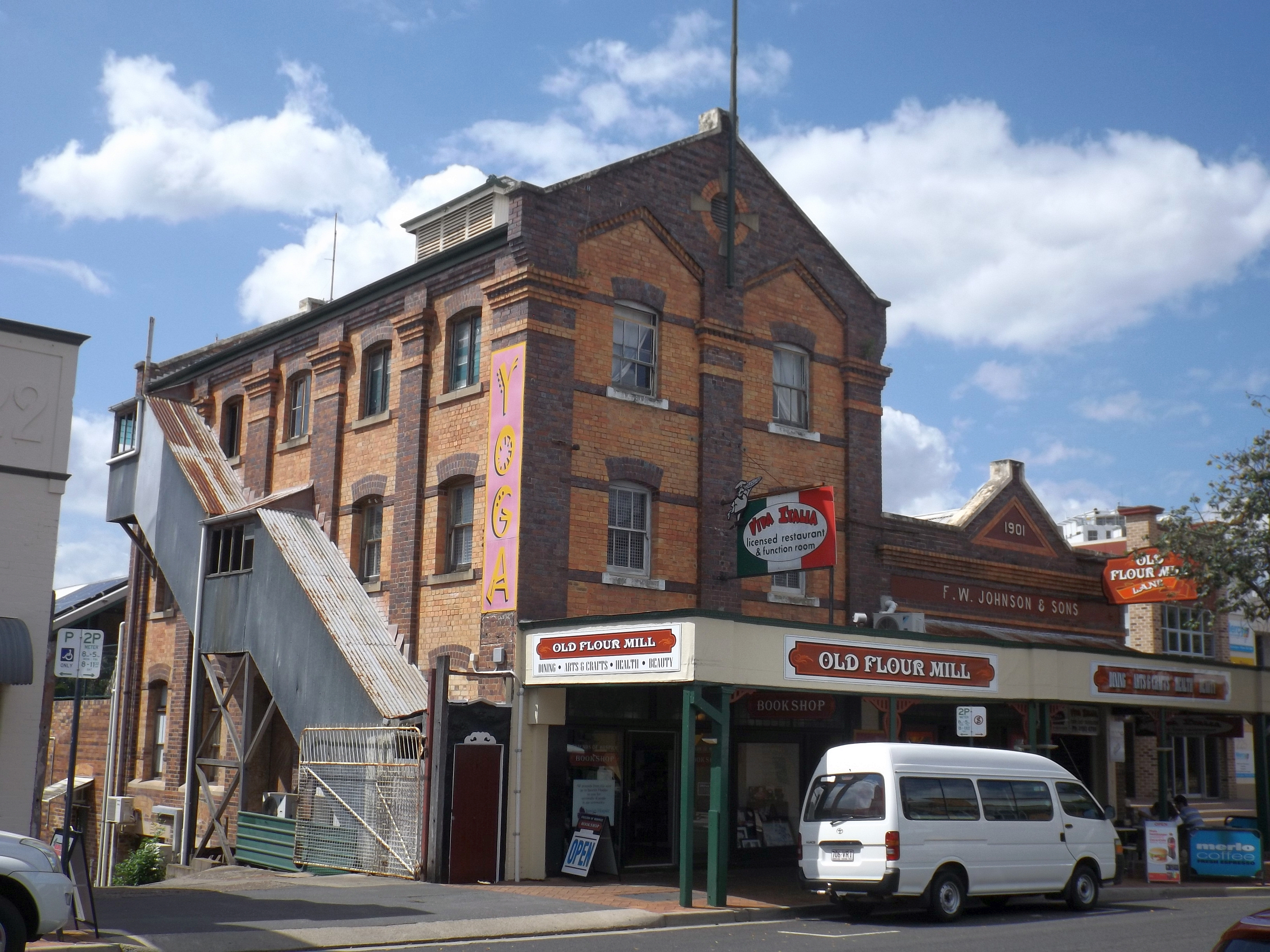
The Flour Mill was built at the turn of the last century

Ipswich has a number of heritage-listed sites, including:

- 5 Brisbane Street: Queensland Country Women's Association Girls' Hostel
- 25 Brisbane Street: Ulster Hotel
- 89 Brisbane Street: Queensland National Bank
- 93 Brisbane Street: William Johnston's Shops
- 116 Brisbane Street: Old Ipswich Town Hall
- 116A Brisbane Street: former Bank of Australasia
- 124 Brisbane Street: St Pauls Anglican Church
- 169–175 Brisbane Street: Bostock Chambers
- 188 Brisbane Street: Baptist Church
- 231 Brisbane Street: Flour Mill
- 253 Brisbane Street: Hotel Metropole
- 68 Chermside Road: St Michaels Nursing Home
- 82 Chermside Road: Ipswich Girls' Grammar School Buildings
- 82 Chermside Road: Lime Kiln Remains
- 48 d'Arcy Doyle Place (formerly Nicholas Street): St Paul's Young Men's Club
- Ellenborough Street: Ipswich Central Mission
- Ellenborough Street: Railway Signal Cabin and Turntable
- 45 East Street: Ipswich & West Moreton Building Society building
- 59 East Street: Old Ipswich Courthouse
- 86 East Street: Uniting Church Central Memorial Hall
- 1 Ginn Street: Ginn Cottage
- 14 Gray Street: Ipswich Club House
- Limestone Street: Liberty Hall
- 22 Limestone Street: St Stephen's Church
- 88 Limestone Street: Ipswich Technical College
- 103 Limestone Street: Penrhyn
- 109 Limestone Street: Colthup's House
- 7 Macalister Street: To-Me-Ree
- Milford Street: Queens Park
- 1A Milford Street: Claremont
- 10A Milford Street: Walter Burley Griffin Incinerator
- 11 Murphy Street: Brickstone
- 63 Nicholas Street: Soldiers' Memorial Hall
- 3 Parker Avenue: Ipswich Mental Hospital (Challinor Centre)
- 21 Quarry Street: Central Congregational Church Manse
- 30 Quarry Street: Toronto (formerly known as Devonshire Cottage)
- 43 Quarry Street: Gooloowan
- Rockton Street: Rockton
- 20 Roderick Street: Keiraville
- 66 Roderick Street: Ozanam House

== Transport ==
=== Local transport ===
There are three forms of public train transport servicing the Ipswich region.

- Queensland Rail Citytrain network offers regular services to and from Ipswich railway station to Brisbane, Brisbane Airport, the eastern suburbs, and western suburbs (as far as Rosewood).
- Westside Buslines is the prominent bus company in Ipswich, linking all sides of town to Ipswich CBD; Redbank; Springfield; or Forest Lake (in Brisbane).
- Southern Cross Citilink is a bus which operates between Ipswich and Indooroopilly via Riverlink, Karalee, Chuwar, Karana Downs, Anstead, and Kenmore.
- Queensland Rail buses offer direct daily services to Gatton, Helidon, Fernvale, Lowood, Coominya, Esk, and Toogoolawah.
- An Airport Express Bus operates from Ipswich to Brisbane Airport on a regular basis.

Ipswich also has direct access to the Ipswich Motorway (linking to Brisbane); the Cunningham Highway (linking to Warwick); the Warrego Highway (linking to Toowoomba); and the Centenary Highway (linking Springfield and the Ripley Valley to Brisbane).

=== Long distance transport ===
- The Westlander train pasts through Ipswich Station twice a week to Toowoomba and Charleville.
- Greyhound Australia (coaches) offer daily direct services to Toowoomba, Mount Isa, Charleville and Sydney from the Ipswich Transit Centre.
- Crisps Coaches offer daily direct services to and from Warwick, Queensland and Stanthorpe.

== Education ==
Ipswich Central State School is a government primary (Early Childhood to Year 6) school for boys and girls at Griffith Road (27.6217°S 152.7683°E). In 2017, the school had an enrolment of 708 students with 54 teachers (50 full-time equivalent) and 43 non-teaching staff (28 full-time equivalent). It includes a special education program.

Ipswich Special School is a special primary and secondary (Early Childhood to Year 12) school for boys and girls at 2a Milford Street (27.6139°S 152.7666°E). In 2017, the school had an enrolment of 116 students with 51 teachers (41 full-time equivalent) and 67 non-teaching staff (39 full-time equivalent).

Ipswich Girls' Grammar School is a private primary and secondary (Prep–12) school for boys and girls at the corner of Queen Victoria Parade and Chermside Road (27.6141°S 152.7712°E). In 2017, the school had an enrolment of 852 students with 73 teachers (69 full-time equivalent) and 126 non-teaching staff (53 full-time equivalent).

Bremer State High School is a government secondary (7–12) school for boys and girls at 133-153 Warwick Road (27.6333°S 152.7553°E). In 2017, the school had an enrolment of 1867 students with 146 teachers (143 full-time equivalent) and 83 non-teaching staff (61 full-time equivalent).

Ipswich Flexible Learning Centre is a Catholic secondary (7–12) school for boys and girls at Cnr Queen Victoria Parade & Milford Place (27.6156°S 152.7664°E). In 2017, the school had an enrolment of 121 students with 13 teachers (9 full-time equivalent) and 13 non-teaching staff (9 full-time equivalent).

The University of Southern Queensland has a campus at Ipswich Campus. It was formerly the Ipswich Campus of the University of Queensland and the Ipswich Mental Hospital (Challinor Centre).

== Libraries ==
The Ipswich Council operates the Ipswich Central Library at 40 South Street. It opened in 1994 and had a major refurbishment in 2017.

== Health ==
- Ipswich Hospital, Chelmsford Avenue
- St Andrews Private Hospital, Roderick Street

Many GPs and specialists can be found in Brisbane and Limestone Street, and near both hospitals.

== Parks and sports facilities ==
- Queens Park
- Limestone Park (AFL, running track, velodrome, netball)
- Sandy Gallop Golf Course
- BMX track
- Denmark Hill Conservation Park
- Ipswich Show Ground (including indoor sports centre)

== Places of worship ==
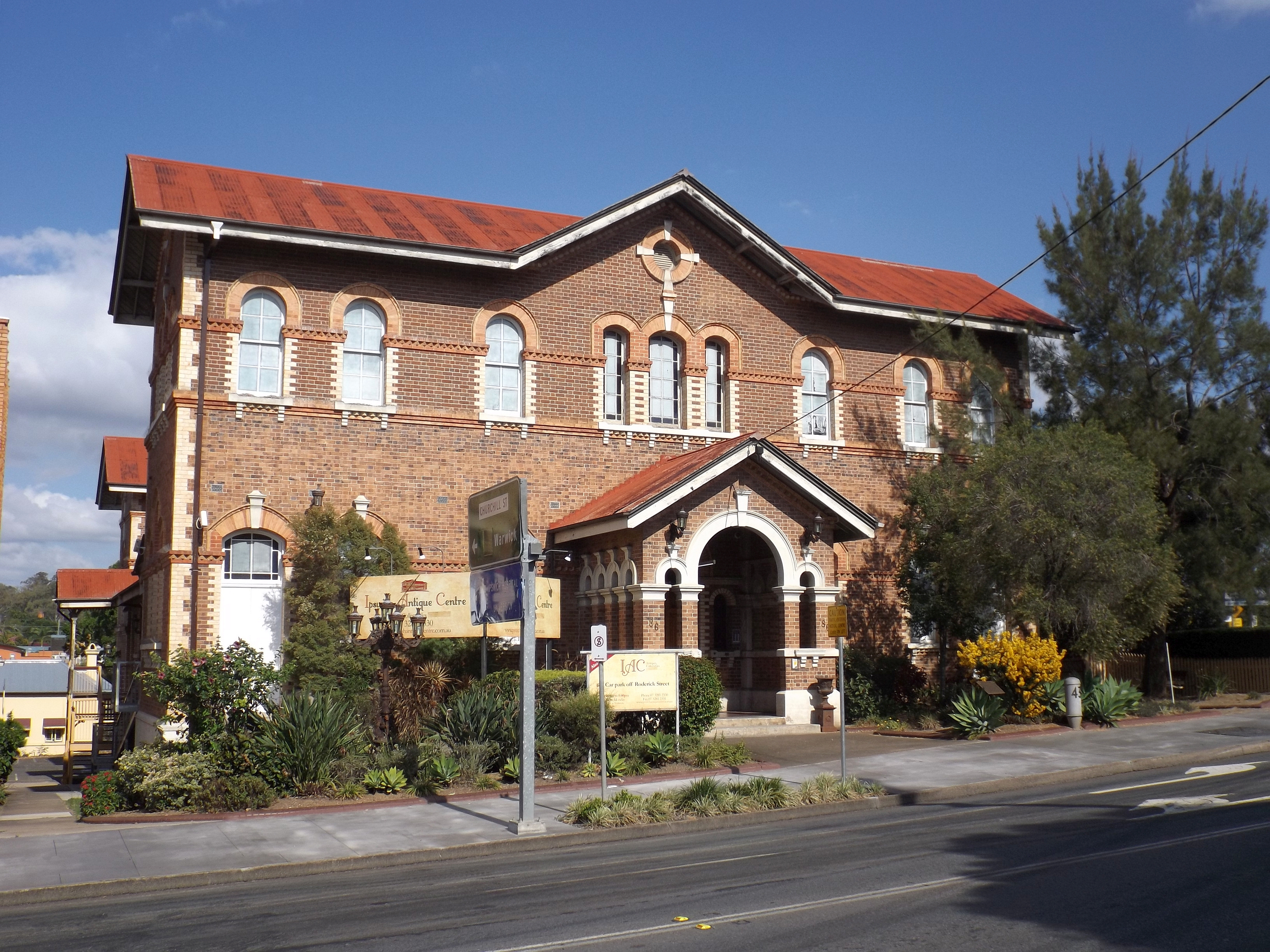
Uniting Church Central Memorial Hall, 2015

- St Mary's Catholic Church, Elizabeth Street
- St Paul's Anglican Church, Brisbane Street
- Calvary Baptist Church, Chermside Street
- Uniting Church, Ellenborough Street
- Church of Jesus Christ of Latter Day Saints, cnr Hunter and Haig Streets
- The Salvation Army, South Street
- Jehovah's Witnesses, Salisbury Street
- St John's Lutheran Church, Roderick Street
- Centro Church, Pring Street
