= Blackwall =

Blackwall may refer to:

== Places ==
=== Australia ===
- Blackwall, New South Wales - A suburb in New South Wales, Australia
- Blackwall, Queensland - A suburb in Queensland, Australia
- Blackwall, Tasmania - A suburb in Tasmania, Australia
- Blackwall Reach (Western Australia) - a section of the Swan River in Western Australia

=== United Kingdom ===
- Blackwall, London, an area of east London, UK
  - Blackwall Tunnel, the main crossing of the River Thames in east London
  - Blackwall Yard, a former shipyard
  - The former shipyard at Leamouth, London of Thames Ironworks and Shipbuilding Company and others.
  - London and Blackwall Railway
    - Blackwall railway station - former eastern terminus of the railway
    - Blackwall DLR station, a station in East London on the Docklands Light Railway
  - Blackwall Buildings - philanthropic housing built by the London and Blackwall Railway in Whitechapel
- Blackwall Reach, a section of the River Thames in London
- Blackwall Reach development, a regeneration scheme in East London

== People ==
- Blackwall (surname)

== Other ==
- Blackwall Frigate - A class of merchant sailing ship built at Blackwall Yard
- Blackwall hitch, a method of temporarily attaching a rope to a hook
- HMS Blackwall (1696), a 50-gun ship of the English Royal Navy
- Blackwall, a character in the 2014 video game Dragon Age: Inquisition

== See also ==
- Blackwell (disambiguation)
