= Blackwell =

Blackwell may refer to:

== Arts and entertainment ==
- Blackwell (series), adventure games for the PC
- Blackwell (band), a US rock band formed by John Bundrick in 1969

== Places ==
=== Canada ===
- Blackwell, Ontario

=== United Kingdom ===
- Blackwell, County Durham, England
- Blackwell, Cumberland, Cumbria, England
- Blackwell (historic house), Westmorland and Furness, Cumbria, England
- Blackwell, Bolsover, Alfreton, Derbyshire, England
- Blackwell, Warwickshire, a location
- Blackwell, West Sussex, a location
- Blackwell, Worcestershire, England
- Blackwell in the Peak, Derbyshire, England

=== United States ===
- Blackwell, Missouri
- Blackwell, Oklahoma
- Blackwell, Texas
- Blackwell, Virginia
- Blackwell, Wisconsin, a town
  - Blackwell (community), Wisconsin, an unincorporated community within the town
- Blackwell Lake, Minnesota
- Blackwell's Island, New York (now known as Roosevelt Island)
- Blackwell, a neighborhood in Richmond, Virginia named for James Blackwell (educator)

== Companies ==
- Blackwell's, a chain of bookshops based in Oxford, England
- Blackwell Publishing, now part of Wiley-Blackwell

== Other uses ==
- Blackwell (surname)
- Blackwell House, a historic house in New York, US
- Blackwell (historic house), Lake District, England
- Blackwell (microarchitecture), of graphics processing units from Nvidia

== See also ==
- Backwell, a village in North Somerset, England
- Blackwall (disambiguation)
- Blackwells (disambiguation)
