= Blackwells =

Blackwells may refer to:

- Blackwell UK, also known as Blackwell's, a chain of bookshops, online retail, mail order and library supply services in the United Kingdom
- Blackwell Publishing, now part of Wiley-Blackwell
- Blackwells, Georgia
- Blackwells, Virginia
- Blackwells Corner, California
- Blackwells Mills, New Jersey
- Blackwells Mills Canal House, in Blackwells Mill, New Jersey

== See also ==
- Blackwell (disambiguation)
