= Colthup's House =

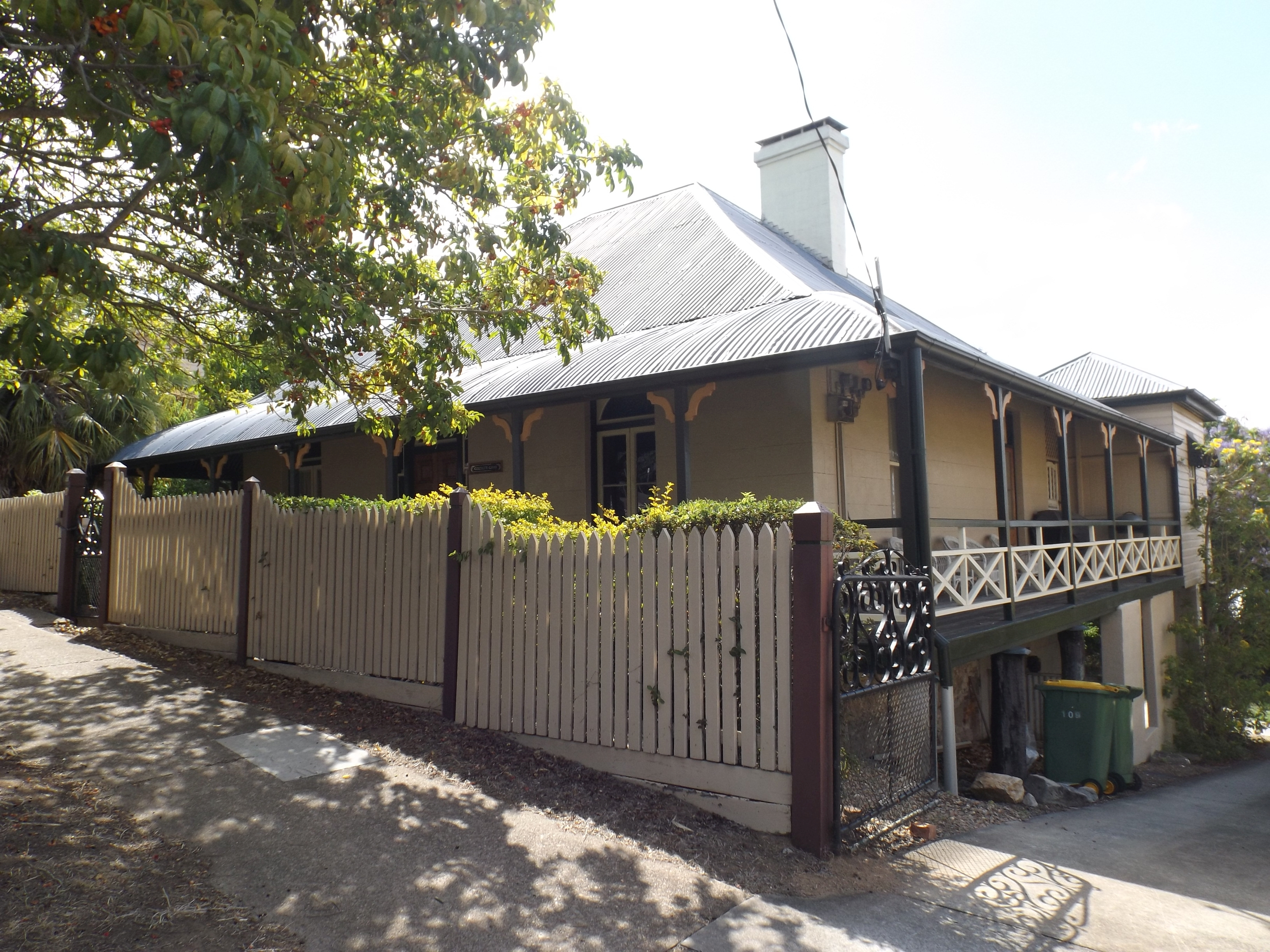
- Residence in 2015

- Location within Queensland Location within Australia
- 27.6156°S 152.7534°E
- Location: 109 Limestone Street, Ipswich CBD, City of Ipswich, Queensland, Australia

History
- Design period: 1870s–1890s (late 19th century)
- Built: c. 1880

Site notes
- Architect: John Farrelly

Queensland Heritage Register
- Official name: Residence, 109 Limestone Street (c.1880), Colthup's House
- Type: state heritage (built)
- Designated: 21 October 1992
- Reference no.: 600582
- Significant period: 1880s (fabric, historical)
- Significant components: residential accommodation – main house, bathroom/bathhouse, furniture/fittings

Colthup's House is a heritage-listed detached house at 109 Limestone Street, Ipswich in the City of Ipswich, Queensland, Australia. It was designed and built by John Farrelly c. 1880. It was added to the Queensland Heritage Register on 21 October 1992.

== History ==
This two-storey brick house is part of a row of four substantial brick houses on Limestone Street, starting from the corner of Waghorn Street, that were built around 1880 by Ipswich builder and architect John Farrelly. Farrelly originally bought Allotments 8, 9, 10 & 11 of Section 28 in 1878 and apparently built the houses from recycled materials salvaged from a fire which had destroyed St Mary's convent.

John Farrelly was listed as living at Waghorn Street (corner of Limestone Street) in Postal Directories until his death in 1904 and owned all four properties until that time, suggesting that Farrelly occupied the first of the four brick homes from the corner while leasing the other three houses to tenants. The house at 109 Limestone Street, along with the other three, are an example of the work of an early property developer who contributed to the middle-class suburban development of Ipswich.

John Farrelly was born in Bawnboy, County Cavan, Ireland where he worked as a builder before he emigrated to Queensland in 1861 and settled in Ipswich. He continued to work as a builder in Ipswich and was listed as an architect from 1878 to 1901, although he had received no formal training in the field. Farrelly was active in local politics and was an unsuccessful Parliamentary candidate for Rosewood in 1888. He was a supporter of the Catholic Church and the eight-hour day. Some of his architectural work in Ipswich included buildings for the Queensland Pastoral and Agricultural Society (1885) and St Patrick's Hall in Darling Street Ipswich (1879) among many other cottages and residences in Ipswich built from the 1870s through to 1900.

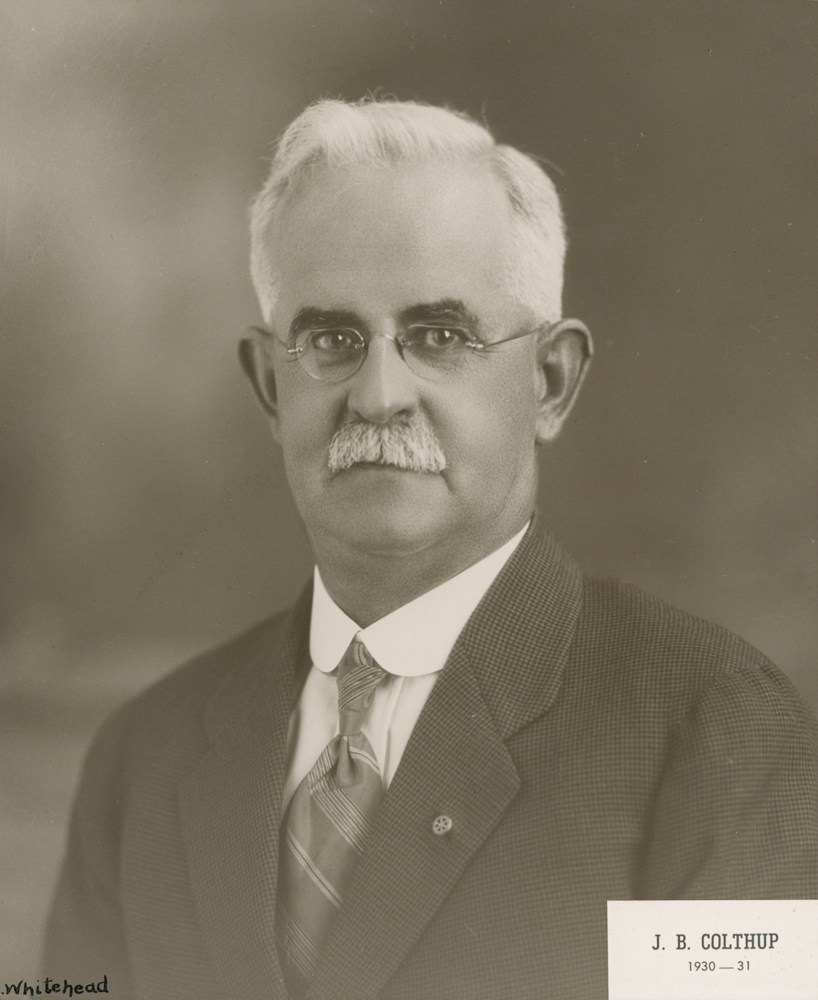
James Barnett Colthup, Ipswich, 1931

In 1909 the house was sold to James Barnett Colthup who purchased Subdivision 1 of Allotment 11 of Section 28. James Colthup was a local ironmonger and later a trader in household furnishings and was listed as having commercial premises in Nicholas Street. The house carried the name Colthup's House. Colthup's Chambers are still extant in Brisbane Street as well as Colthup Home in Thorn Street, a modern nursing home which has obscured the presence of an original 19th century residence owned by the Colthup family from 1918 to 1958.

In 1918 James Colthup sold the house at 109 Limestone Street and the property continued to change hands many times during the 20th Century. The house was converted to flats most probably in the 1930s when the verandahs were enclosed and the staircase removed. The back verandah remains enclosed displaying coloured glass windows in the exterior wall.

The house at 109 Limestone Street remains as the most intact example of the four houses constructed by John Farrelly. The original design is easily visible and all interior joinery is still intact. The house also clearly displays evidence that the building materials were recycled. The house still demonstrates the original characteristics of its initial purpose as a late 19th century middle class residence.

== Description ==
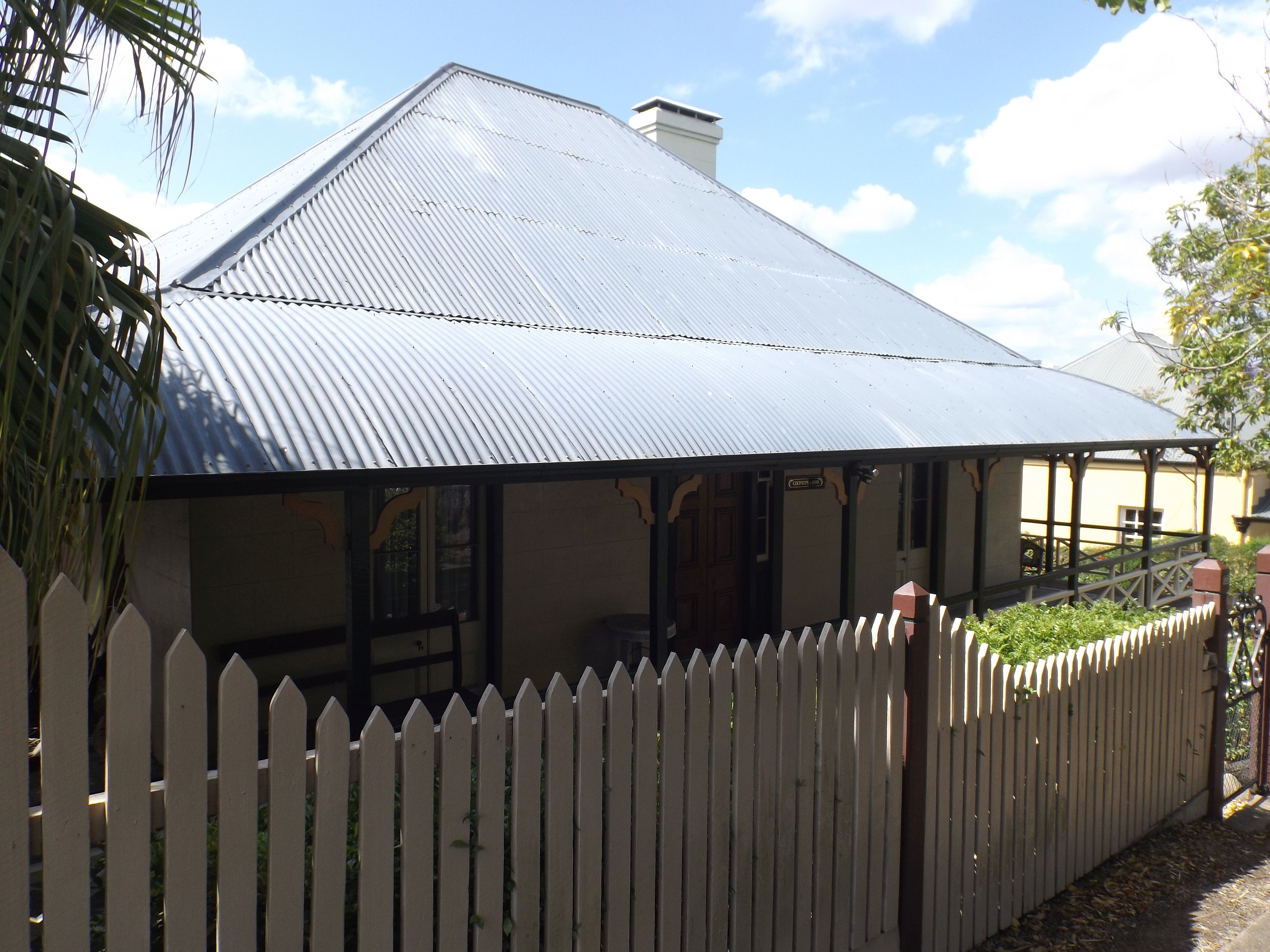
View from footpath, 2015

The house is set close to Limestone street presenting a single storey to the street with the land falling away to the rear of the property, with two storeys at the rear. It is of load bearing brick rendered with ruled joints. The roofline is a steeply pitched hip and is broken at the verandah line to form a curved profile. The house was constructed from recycled materials from St Mary's Convent and this can be seen in the size of the structural timbers and the distinctive windows.

The upper level consists of a central hallway containing a stair to the lower level, with three bedrooms opening from the left of the hall and two formal rooms opening from the right. The hallway is a generous size and both front and rear doors are original and feature sidelights with Gothic arches and coloured glass. The formal living rooms contain back to back fireplaces and open to the verandah via French doors. The verandah surrounds four sides of the upper level and is enclosed at one side to form a storeroom. The house has been extended at the rear to form a family room, kitchen and bathroom. The core rooms on the upper level have vaulted ceilings of tongue and groove boarding and double-hung windows with distinctive top sashes with curved tops. The hallway ceiling has been lined with plasterboard. The original window and door joinery is intact. The verandah was enclosed earlier and no elements of the original detailing remain.

The lower level consists of a hallway, two bedrooms and a new bathroom. One of the bedrooms was the original kitchen and contains a large fireplace. The area under the front verandah can be accessed from the lower level hall and is enclosed with rough stonework with a concrete floor and a small timber window. This space is said to be the original bathroom and contains a concrete tub, which was apparently a feature of all John Farrelly's houses.

== Heritage listing ==
Colthup's House was listed on the Queensland Heritage Register on 21 October 1992 having satisfied the following criteria.

The place is important in demonstrating the evolution or pattern of Queensland's history.

The house is important in demonstrating the pattern of Queensland's history in that it reflects the suburban development of Ipswich in the latter 19th century. As one of four houses constructed around 1880 by the builder John Farrelly it is an example of multiple property development in a time of growth and expansion for Ipswich. It also exemplifies a trend in usage of recycled building materials as common practice during the period of construction.

The place is important in demonstrating the principal characteristics of a particular class of cultural places.

The house is an intact example of an 1880s middle class dwelling with original design features and fittings still evident in the fabric. It stands as the most intact example of a group for four adjacent dwellings constructed around 1880.

The place is important because of its aesthetic significance.

The house contributes significantly to the streetscape of upper Limestone Street approaching the hill towards Burnett Street and the surrounding area which is characterised by many examples of 19th century houses. Most notable is the coherent streetscape presented by the four adjacent masonry dwellings (being 109, 107, 105 & 103 Limestone Street) all of similar design and construction.

The place has a special association with the life or work of a particular person, group or organisation of importance in Queensland's history.

The house has special association with life and work of local architect and builder and prominent member of the Ipswich community John Farrelly. Farrelly was registered as an architect in Ipswich from 1878 to 1901.
