= Blue Care =

Blue Care is an agency of UnitingCare Queensland, the health and community arm of the Uniting Church in Queensland, Australia. Originally established as the Blue Nursing Service by the Methodist Church in 1953, it has grown into one of the largest not-for-profit providers of residential aged care, community care and retirement living in Queensland and northern New South Wales. In 2009 on Queensland Day it was announced that Blue Care was the recipient of the Queensland Greats Awards.

== History ==
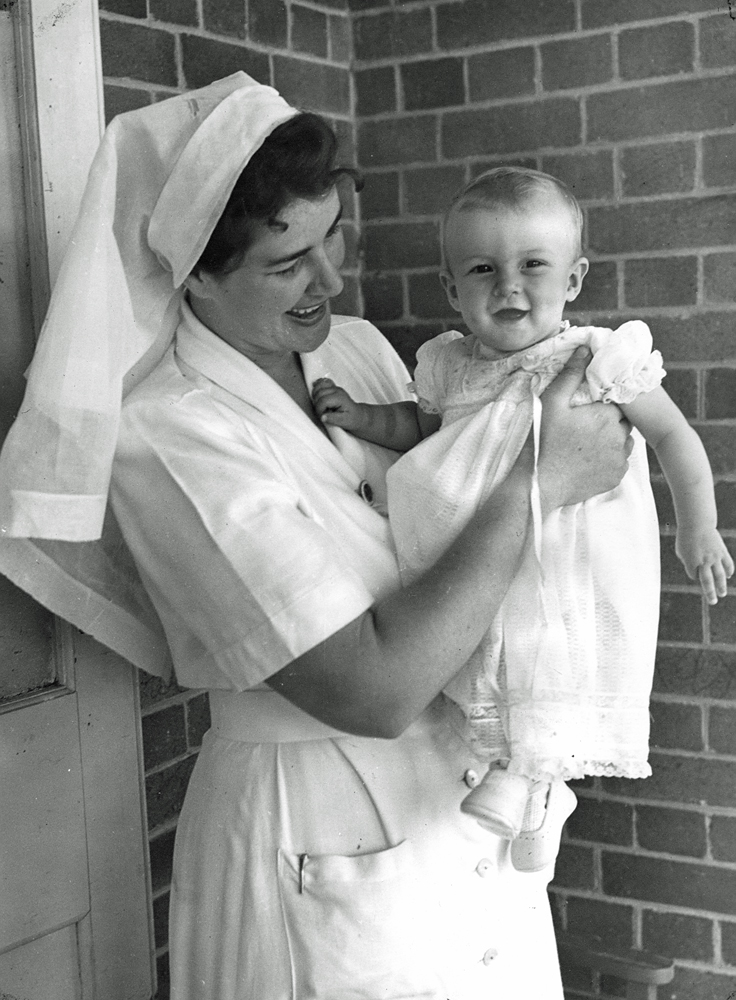
Sister Olive McAllister, the first Blue Nurse in Ipswich, Queensland, 1951

The Newtown Methodist Mission in Sydney, launched an aged care nursing service in 1949. The nurses became known as the "Angels in Blue" because of their blue uniforms.

Inspired by the Newtown service, the Blue Nursing Service was launched in Brisbane, Queensland, on 24 August 1953 by the West End Methodist Mission. The service was to provide in-home nursing care to those who needed it on Brisbane's southside suburbs. It was intended for people recently released from hospital to convalesce at home and for those at home with chronic illnesses. At its inception, the service consisted of one full-time paid nurse, Sister Olive Crombie, for daytime work with a car provided for her use and four volunteer nurses to be "at call" overnight who had to have access to their own car. A small payment was requested for the nursing service, but it would be provided free for those in poverty. Like the Sydney service, the nurses wore blue uniforms and became known as the "Blue Nurses". Within three weeks of the launch, Sister Crombie was fully busy and the Lord Mayor of Brisbane Frank Roberts commenced fundraising to expand the service, offering to donate a pay rise of £350 towards the Blue Nursing Service or a similar municipal scheme. By October 1953, Methodists in Ipswich were seeking to expand the Blue Nursing Service to Ipswich as one of the first activities of their new Central Mission. By November 1953, the Brisbane service expanded to a second full-time daytime nurse and three people who would do housework for the sick.

In 1983, the now heritage-listed house Kieraville in Ipswich became the headquarters for the Blue Nurses.

In 2009 as part of the Q150 celebrations, Blue Care was announced as one of the Q150 Icons of Queensland for its role as an iconic "innovation and invention".

In 2015 Blue Care was inducted into the Queensland Business Leaders Hall of Fame in recognition of its leadership and contribution to developing services in aged care throughout the communities of Queensland for over sixty years.

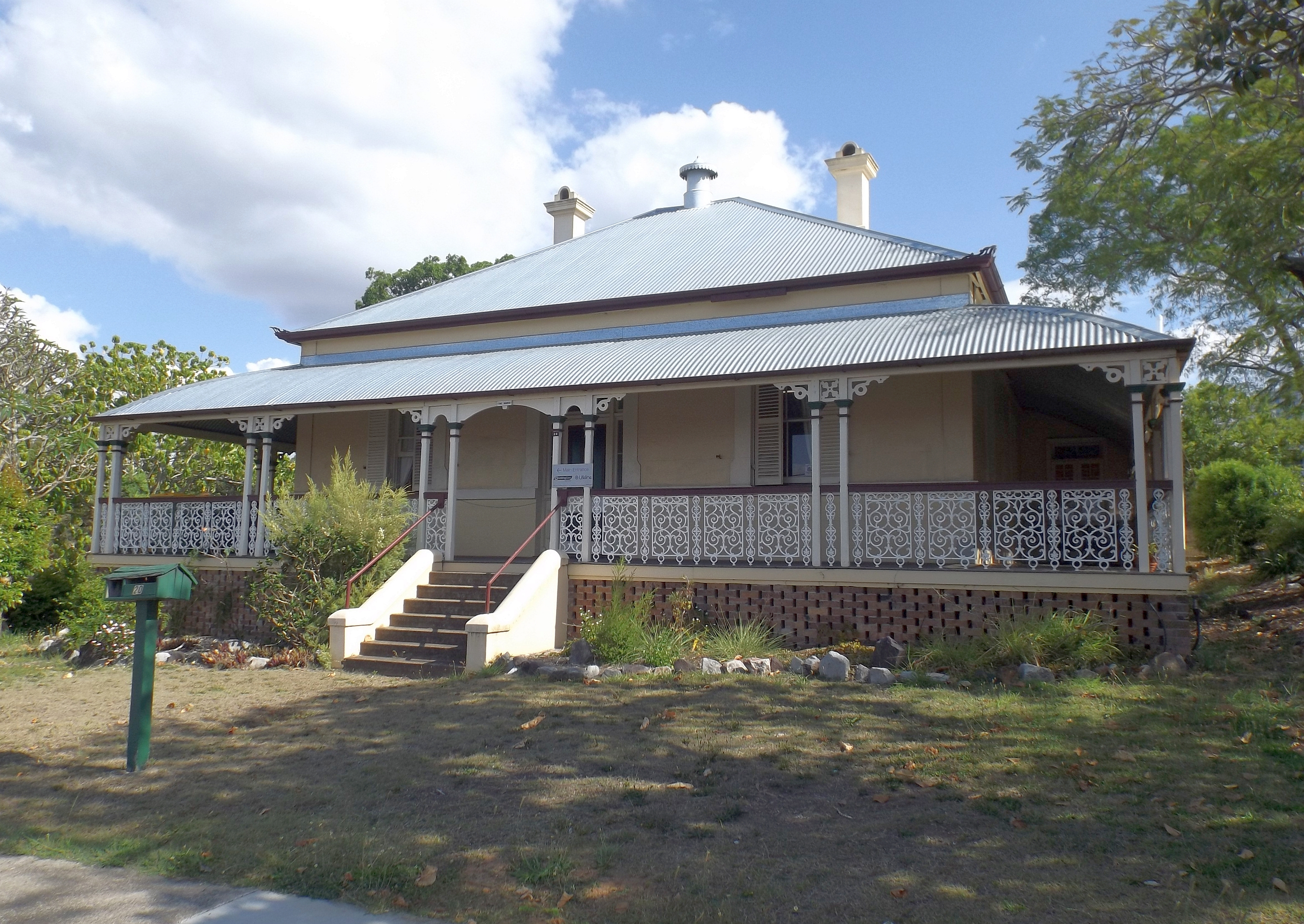
Keiraville, Ipswich
