= Blackwall, Queensland =

Blackwall
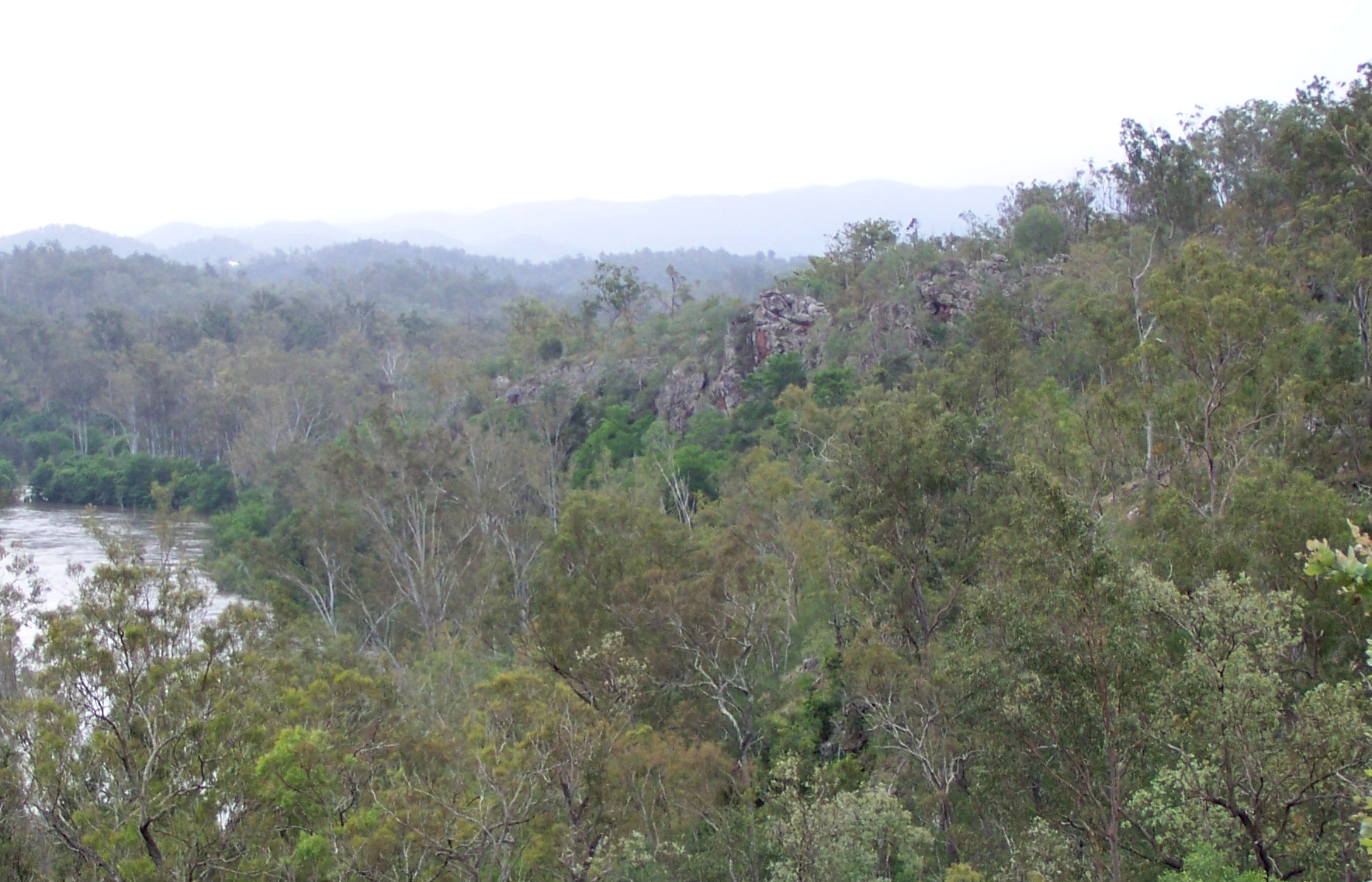
- The Blackwall rises above the Brisbane River

- Coordinates: 27.5416°S 152.7705°E
- Country: Australia
- State: Queensland
- LGA: City of Brisbane
- Location: 10.0 km (6.2 mi) NNE of Ipswich CBD; 42.8 km (26.6 mi) SW of Brisbane CBD

Government
  - State electorate: Ipswich West
  - Federal division: Blair
- Postcode: 4306

Blackwall is a neighbourhood within Chuwar in the City of Brisbane, Queensland, Australia. It probably takes its name from the nearby cliff alongside the Brisbane River known as The Blackwall.
