= Ginn Cottage =

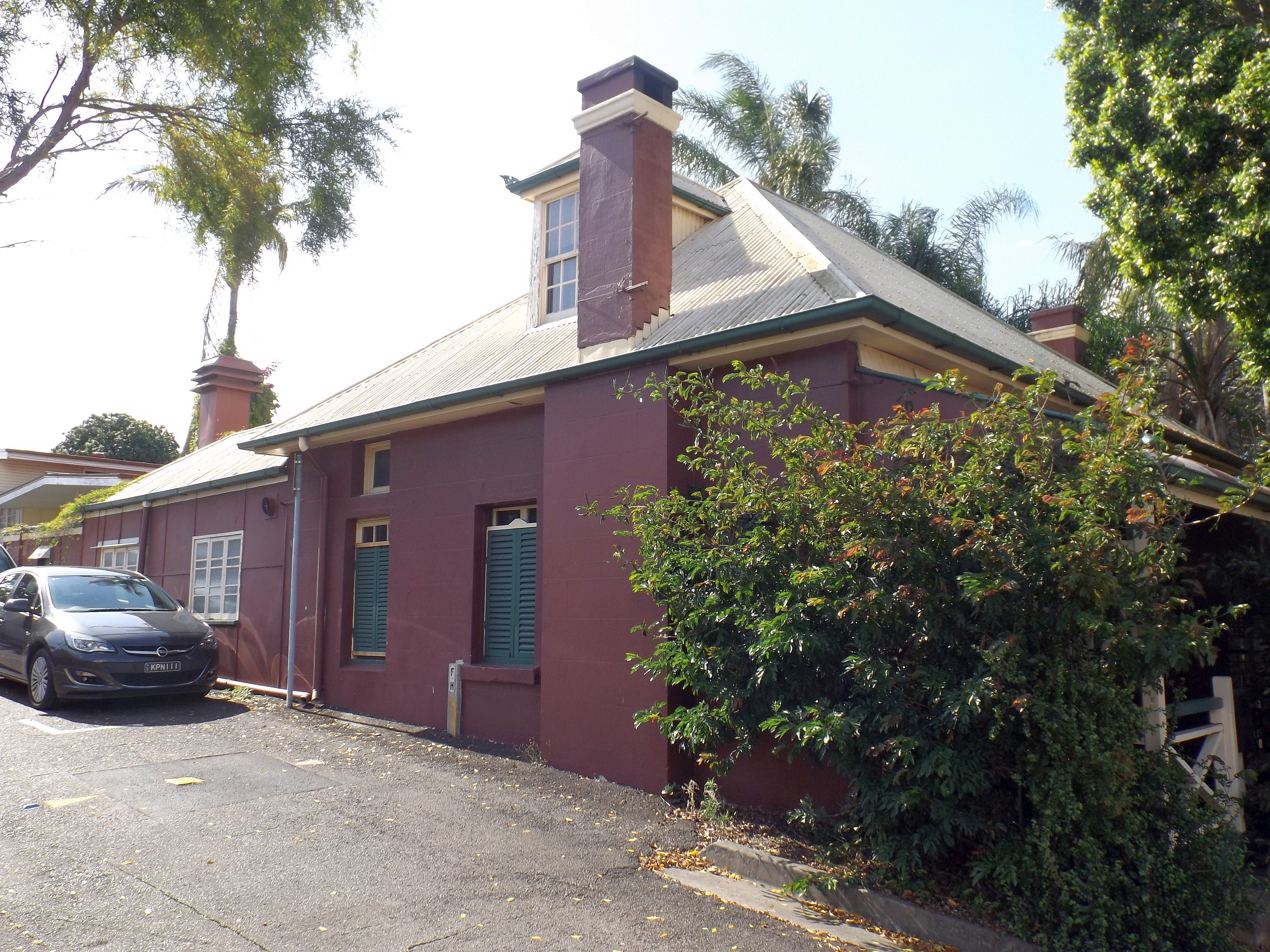
- Residence in 2015

- Location within Queensland Location within Australia
- 27.6179°S 152.7591°E
- Location: 1 Ginn Street, Ipswich, City of Ipswich, Queensland, Australia

History
- Design period: 1840s–1860s (mid-19th century)
- Built: c. 1859–c. 1910

Site notes
- Architect(s): William & Eliza Jane Ginn

Queensland Heritage Register
- Official name: Ginn Cottage
- Type: state heritage (built)
- Designated: 21 October 1992
- Reference no.: 600579
- Significant period: 1850s–1860s, 1910s circa (fabric); 1850s–1890s (historical)
- Significant components: attic, residential accommodation – main house

Ginn Cottage is a heritage-listed detached house at 1 Ginn Street, Ipswich, City of Ipswich, Queensland, Australia. It was built from c. 1859 to c. 1910. It was added to the Queensland Heritage Register on 21 October 1992.

== History ==
Ginn Cottage is a brick cottage with an attic, built in 1859 for William Ginn and his second wife Eliza Jane. The architect and builder are not known.

Ginn was born in Ireland and migrated to Sydney where it is thought he met his first wife, a Miss Graham who died in childbirth. In the 1850s, he moved to Ipswich and managed the produce store of G.H. Wilson. He married Eliza Jane Costly (date uncertain) and they built Ginn Cottage as their family home; the land was purchased in late 1858 and the cottage was built by 1860 when Council rates records begin. In 1886, Ginn complained to the Colonial Secretary that the sale had been defective and the cottage was actually built on part of the roadway behind the Court House; this boundary problem was resolved and the street was named Ginn Street.

In 1879, Ginn left Wilsons and, in partnership with Harry Hooper, formed the merchant firm Ginn and Hooper. Hooper died in December 1896. According to family information, Ginn had already decided to continue his business alone and had mortgaged Ginn Cottage to help finance himself; however he died in January 1897, just before this firm was due to open.

Ginn was also involved in other enterprises including coal mining, a store in Augathella and raising racehorses. He was a founding board member of the Ipswich and West Moreton Building Society and was involved in community organisations.

The cottage is said by the family to have originally included a detached kitchen and stables. A kitchen wing was built attached to the house (said to have been in 1910) and a bathroom and other rear extensions were added at some time prior to 1970. The verandahs were enclosed prior to 1970.

Other alterations include changing the shingle roof (seen in an early family photograph) to corrugated galvanised iron and rendering the brickwork. The dates of these changes are unknown.

By 1970, the building was in poor condition with some internal joinery removed. It was bought by Nita and Noel Buchanan and renovated. After use as professional offices for several years, it was again sold and converted into a restaurant.

== Description ==
Ginn Cottage is a brick cottage, rendered with ruled joints. The sharply-pitched hipped roof is clad in corrugated galvanised iron. The cottage has an attic level and has dormer windows on the southern and northern faces and symmetrically-placed brick chimneys.

The main house has a verandah on three sides, the rear verandah being enclosed. The front facade has a central doorway with a multi-paned French door on either side, opening onto the front verandah which has a sandstone step onto the footpath. The southern side abuts Meredith Lane.

The interior has four main rooms, two with a fireplace. The two main rooms have pressed metal ceilings and some original four-panelled doors survive. The attic contains two rooms which are lined with tongue and groove boarding and which have internal shutters on the windows. A ledged and braced door is between the two rooms. The attic is accessed by a steep central staircase with simple square balusters.

The rear single-storey kitchen wing is of timber frame clad in fibro-cement and has a hip roof. This wing is extended towards the west with a skillion roof over a small bathroom.

Outbuildings include a weatherboard-sheeted rear toilet block built as amenities for the restaurant and a flat-roofed carport constructed of steel frame.

== Heritage listing ==
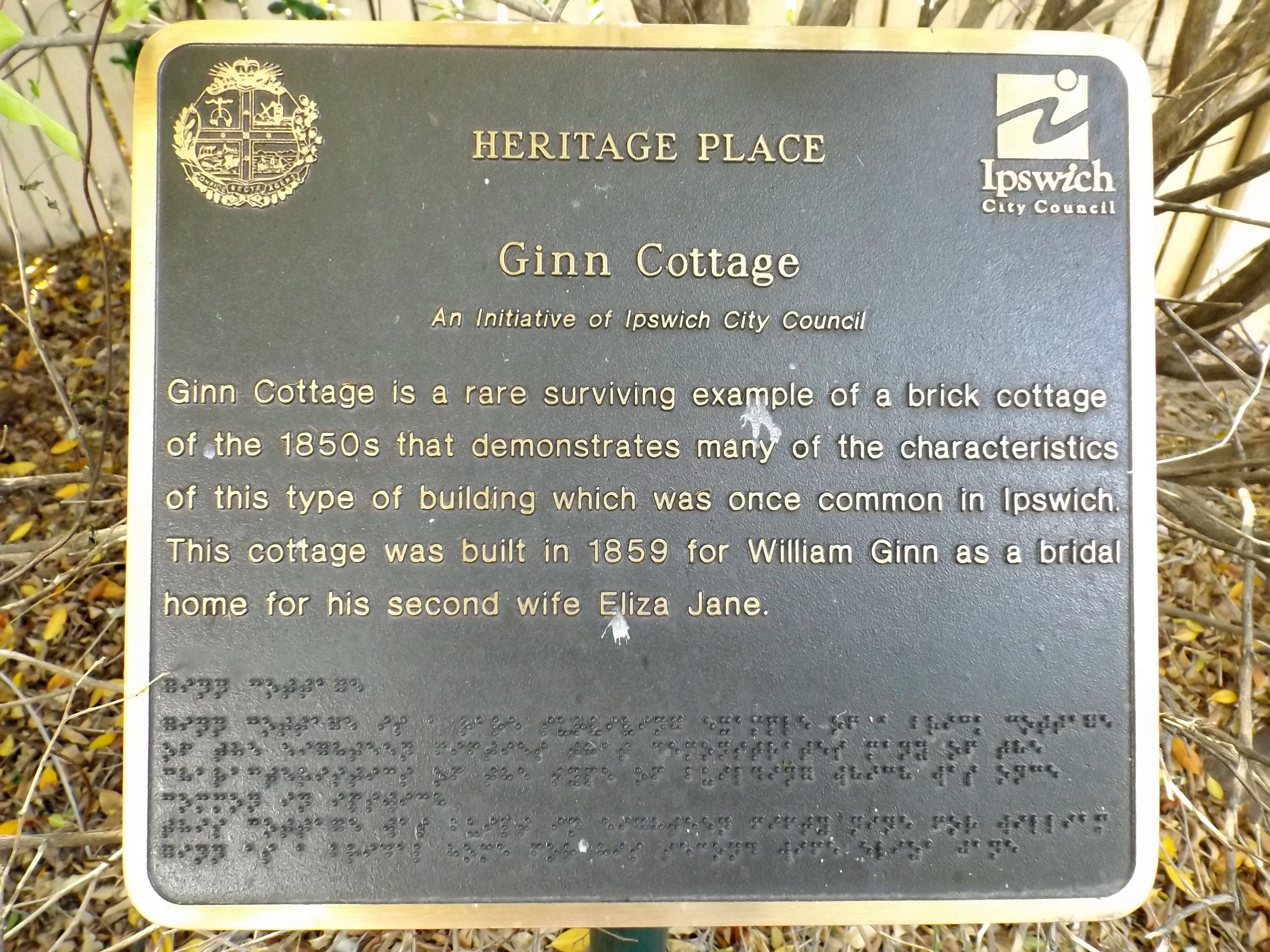
Plaque, 2015

Ginn Cottage was listed on the Queensland Heritage Register on 21 October 1992 having satisfied the following criteria.

The place demonstrates rare, uncommon or endangered aspects of Queensland's cultural heritage.

Built in 1859, Ginn Cottage is a rare surviving example of a brick cottage of the 1850s and still demonstrates many of the characteristics of this type of building which was once common in Ipswich.

The place is important in demonstrating the principal characteristics of a particular class of cultural places.

Built in 1859, Ginn Cottage is a rare surviving example of a brick cottage of the 1850s and still demonstrates many of the characteristics of this type of building which was once common in Ipswich.

The place is important because of its aesthetic significance.

It exhibits aesthetic characteristics valued by the community and contributes significantly to the streetscape of an important historical area in central Ipswich.

The place has a special association with the life or work of a particular person, group or organisation of importance in Queensland's history.

It is associated with the life and work of William Ginn, a notable early Queensland resident and businessman who is also associated with the formation of the Ipswich and West Moreton Building Society.
