= Queensland Country Women's Association Girls' Hostel =

Heritage-listed building in Queensland, Australia

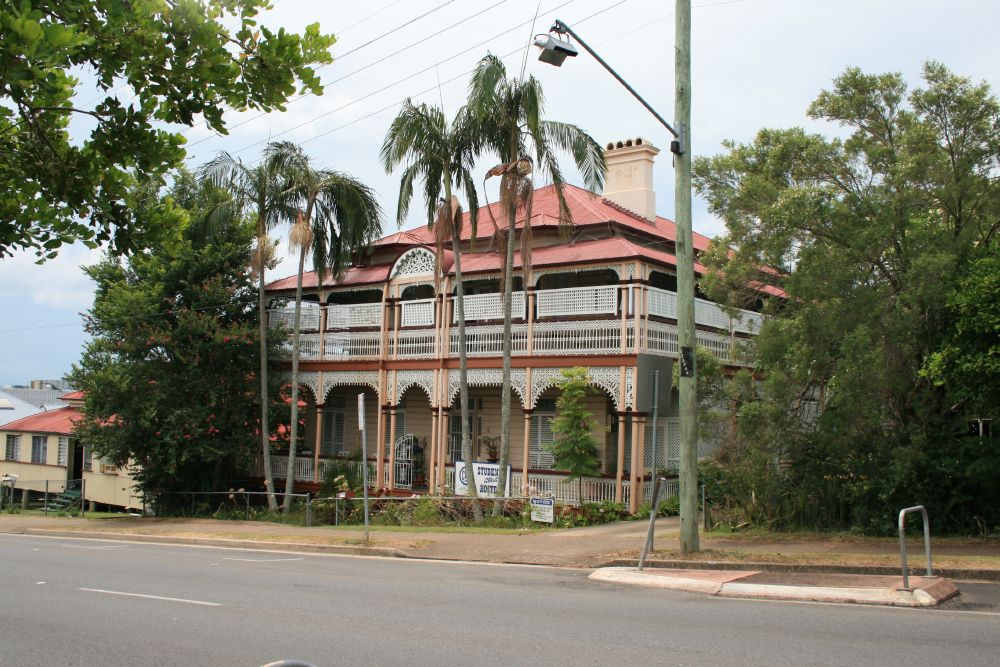
- Queensland Country Women's Association Girls' Hostel, 2009

- Location within Queensland Location within Australia
- 27.6154°S 152.7658°E
- Location: 5 Brisbane Street, Ipswich, City of Ipswich, Queensland, Australia

History
- Design period: 1870s–1890s (late 19th century)
- Built: c. 1885–c. 1911

Queensland Heritage Register
- Official name: Queensland Country Women's Association Girls' Hostel
- Type: state heritage (built, landscape)
- Designated: 21 October 1992
- Reference no.: 600558
- Significant period: 1880s, 1900s–1910s (fabric); 1880s, 1908–1940s (historical); 1949– (social)
- Significant components: trees/plantings, residential accommodation – main house

Queensland Country Women's Association Girls' Hostel is a heritage-listed detached house at 5 Brisbane Street, Ipswich, City of Ipswich, Queensland, Australia. It was built from c. 1885 to c. 1911. It was added to the Queensland Heritage Register on 21 October 1992.

== History ==
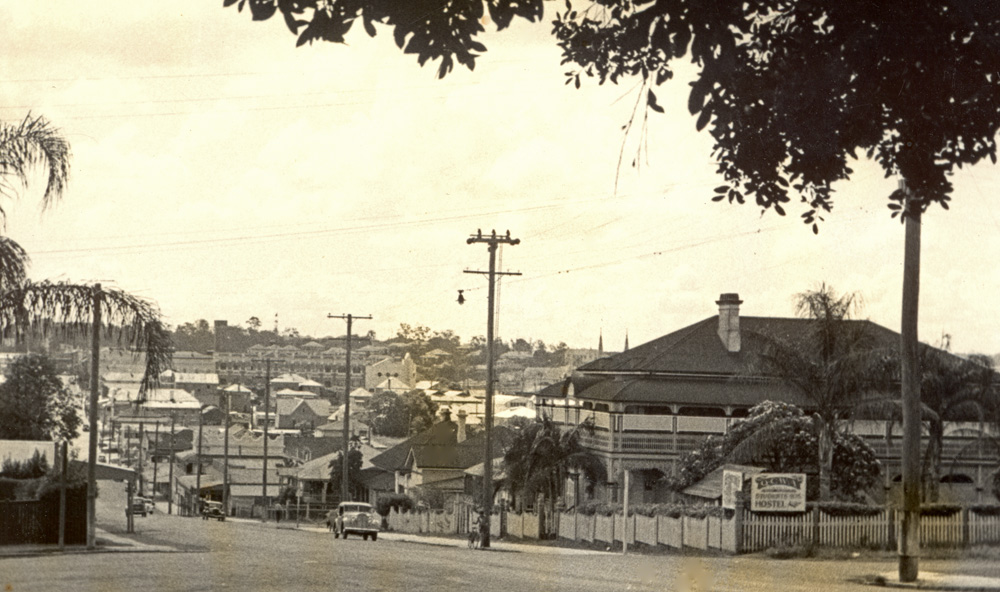
QCWA Hostel, Brisbane Street, Ipswich, 1940s

The building was constructed about 1885 as a single-storey timber house for Thomas Towell and his second wife Sarah. When Towell died about 1904, the property passed to his widow Sarah. The next significant owner was Dr Edward Elmslie Brown who bought it in 1908. Within the next three years, Brown added a second storey. Brown used the enlarged building as a residence and consulting rooms and built a timber hospital "Oakdale" adjacent with its entry facing Milford Street. He later added a second hospital building and a matron's residence. Brown died in 1941 and the house was bought by the Queensland Country Women's Association (QCWA) in 1949 for use as a hostel for students and young women. A single-storey brick building containing several residential units for elderly women was built c. 1960 adjacent to the house (on the corner of Brisbane and Milford Streets) and is known as Melody Lodge. One of Dr Brown's hospital buildings in Milford St is now a QCWA hostel for aged people. The matron's quarters in Milford St is now a residence. The second hospital building was destroyed by fire in the late 1980s at which time it was a boarding house.

== Description ==
The building is a large two-storeyed timber structure with chamferboard external walls surrounded at both levels by elaborately decorated verandahs. A single storey laundry wing extends at the rear and is connected to the central hallway by an enclosed rear verandah. A skillion-roofed cement clad ablutions block, probably of c. 1950 construction, is connected to the north-west corner of the ground floor verandah. The front has plantings of palms and hedges, particularly the distinctive double palms each side of the main entry.

== Heritage listing ==
Queensland Country Women's Association Girls' Hostel was listed on the Queensland Heritage Register on 21 October 1992 having satisfied the following criteria.

The place is important in demonstrating the evolution or pattern of Queensland's history.

The place is important in demonstrating the tendency of early Queensland residents to enlarge and adapt existing buildings, having been converted from a single-storey house built c. 1885 to a two-storey house c. 1908.

The place demonstrates rare, uncommon or endangered aspects of Queensland's cultural heritage.

The QCWA Girls' Hostel is a fine and rare example of a large two-storey timber residence.

The place is important in demonstrating the principal characteristics of a particular class of cultural places.

The QCWA Girls' Hostel is a fine and rare example of a large two-storey timber residence.

The place is important because of its aesthetic significance.

It exhibits aesthetic characteristics in its fine Federation detailing including elaborate flower patterned lacework and attractive timber decoration. Its architectural form, scale, siting, detailing and front garden plantings make a significant contribution to the streetscape of Ipswich.

The place has a strong or special association with a particular community or cultural group for social, cultural or spiritual reasons.

It is closely associated with the work of the QCWA in providing supervised city accommodation for young country girls, particularly students.

The place has a special association with the life or work of a particular person, group or organisation of importance in Queensland's history.

The place is associated with the life and work of an early telegraph operator Thomas Towell and a prominent early doctor and businessman Edward Elmslie Brown.
