= William Johnston's Shops =

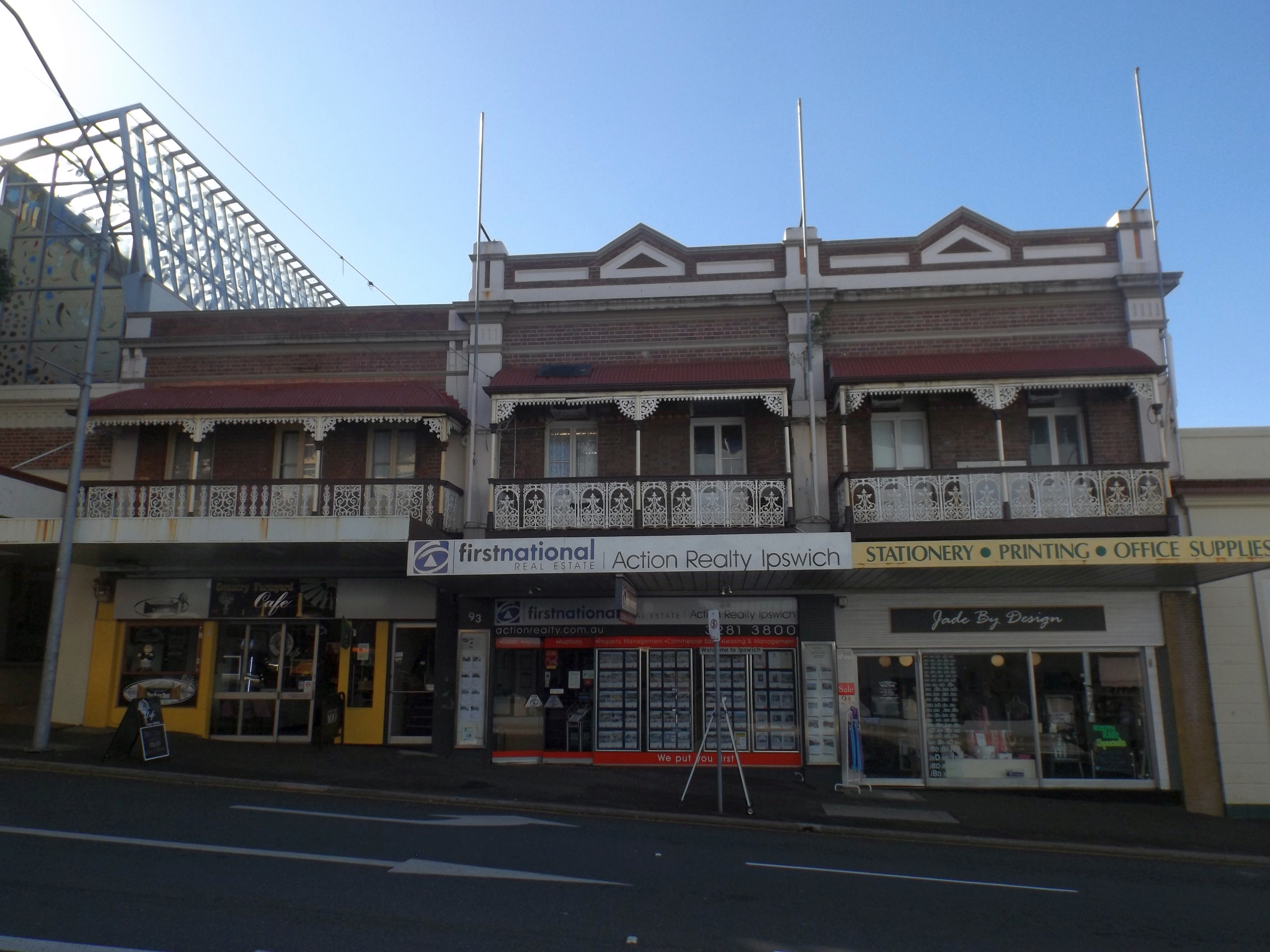
- Front of building, 2016

- Location within Queensland Location within Australia
- 27.6143°S 152.7606°E
- Location: 93 Brisbane Street, Ipswich, City of Ipswich, Queensland, Australia

History
- Design period: 1870s–1890s (late 19th century)
- Built: 1877–1880s

Queensland Heritage Register
- Official name: Action Realty
- Type: state heritage (built)
- Designated: 21 October 1992
- Reference no.: 600560
- Significant period: 1870s, 1880s (fabric); 1877–ongoing (historical use)
- Significant components: cellar, residential accommodation – manager's house/quarters

William Johnston's Shops are a heritage-listed row of three shops at 93 Brisbane Street, Ipswich, City of Ipswich, Queensland, Australia. They were built from 1877 to 1880s. It was added to the Queensland Heritage Register on 21 October 1992.

== History ==
The two-storey brick shops which front Brisbane Street were constructed in stages between 1877 and 1893. William George Johnston had purchased two adjacent pieces of land on Brisbane Street in 1876 and 1877 (Sub A of Allotment 1 of Section 2 and Sub B of Allotment 2 of Section 2 respectively) after the Clarendon Hotel, which previously stood on the land, was destroyed by fire on 19 January 1875. He then took out a mortgage for £400 from the Ipswich and West Moreton Permanent Benefit Building and Investment Society on 18 October 1877 at which time he advertised a tender notice for the erection of a two-storey brick house in Brisbane Street.

The Clarendon Hotel, formerly the Queens Arms Hotel, was established by George Thorn around 1843/44. George Thorn arrived in Ipswich with his wife and son in 1835 as Superintendent of a "cattle establishment" which was a branch convict settlement of Brisbane. At the first land sales for Ipswich by auction in Sydney on 11 October 1843, Thorn purchased Allotments 1 & 2, of Section 2 Par Ipswich and later Allotments 27 & 28 which covered the corner of the block fronting Brisbane and East Streets. He subsequently established the Palais Royal Hotel on this land soon changing the name to the Queens Arms Hotel.

The Queens Arms was described as a "long one-storeyed brick building with the main frontage facing East Street". Thorn was said to have provided the "best accommodation, breakfasts, dinners, suppers and every other refreshment in five minutes, together with wines, spirits and stabling equal to any in the Colony". Being one of the earliest public buildings in Ipswich, the Queens Arms was often used for public purposes such as auctions of land and was used as the premises for the Court until the Ipswich Court House was constructed in 1853.

By 1859/60 the name had changed again to the Clarendon Hotel and on 19 January 1875 the building was destroyed by a fire which apparently started in the hotel's kitchen in the early hours of the morning. The fire also destroyed the offices of the Observer and the offices of William Hendren both of which were adjacent to the Clarendon.

It is widely held that the brick cellar which is underneath the 1877 brick building is the remains of the original Queens Arms Hotel, although there is no proof of this claim. If, in fact, the cellar was part of the original Queens' Arms hotel, it would be the oldest surviving structure in Ipswich, linking the city with its original settler, George Thorn who came to Ipswich in 1835.

After William Johnston had constructed the first of the brick shops in 1877 he leased it to Dan Kennedy who used the building as premises for the Victoria Hotel from 1883 to 1891. There is evidence that the cellar was used for storage purposes at this time, or perhaps earlier, from the grooves cut into the stairs accessing the cellar for wheeling barrels in and out .

The exact construction date of the two gabled brick shops adjacent to the 1877 building has not been ascertained but they did appear in a photograph of Brisbane Street during the 1893 flood. Businesses were registered as operating at the site of the buildings in the Queensland Post Office Directories from the 1880s, including a bakery in the shop closest to East St and a watchmakers in the middle shop. As the shop closest to East Street was used as a bakery and then a cafe for most of the 20th century it may be plausible to assume that the shop was built in the 1880s and originally used as a bakery. The construction of the shops reflect the establishment of Ipswich as a commercial centre in the booming late 1870s and 1880s.

The shops changed hands several times after William Johnston sold the property in 1917. The shops had been used mostly for hospitality businesses in the twentieth century including Bunces Cake Shop and the Dorothy Belle Cafe situated in the shop closest to East St and the Metro Cafe in the middle shop.

In 1970 the property was purchased by Garth Llewellyn and the ground floor of the middle shop and the top level of the two gabled shops were used as offices for Action Realty.

In the 1980s the original iron posts which supported a convex corrugated iron awning were knocked out by a bus and the awning and posts were replaced by the current modern awning across the three shops.

The 1877 building is occupied by a second hand clothing store, the middle shop by Action Realty and the end shop is a printery.

== Description ==
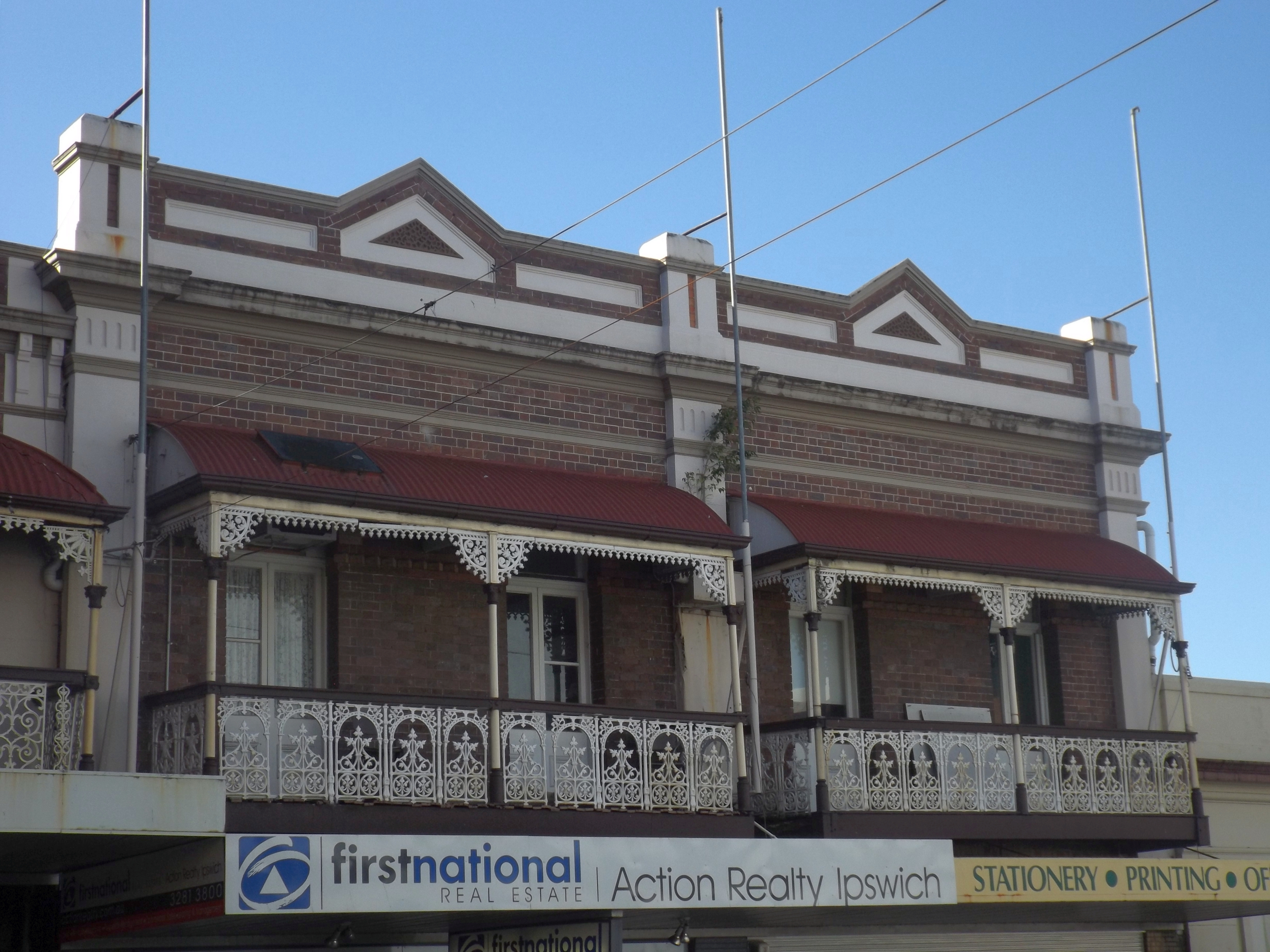
Upper floors, 2016

The three adjacent two-storey brick shops fronting Brisbane Street present a cohesive group which contribute significantly to the nineteenth century streetscape of this part of Brisbane Street.

The two westerly shops are a matching pair of two-storey, gabled roofed brick shops, the details above the cantilevered awning being relatively intact, with cantilevered wooden balconies decorated with cast ion posts and balustrades and curved corrugated iron roofs. The walls are decorated with polychrome and projecting brickwork and classical mouldings in cement render and have small central triangular pediments. The shop front at ground level has been substantially altered with a large glass display window dominating the entrance at Action Realty and the printers shop next door.

The interior of the Action Realty offices is of modern open plan design with partitions providing individual work spaces and a reception counter at the front. The ceiling of the ground floor has been lowered from its original height. The upper floor has been opened to create a large space over the area of the two shops. It still contains an original staircase in the eastern end of the building. The ground floor ceiling of the printers' shop still displays original ceiling roses and cornices picked out in pink paint.

The earlier 1877 shop blends with the later gabled shops but is of simpler design. The upper balcony also displays cast iron balustrades with decorative iron posts and a convex corrugated iron awning, The upper rooms are accessed by French doors to the balcony. This building has a plain horizontal parapet. A difference in the colour and texture of brick is also visible between this building and the two adjacent gabled shops. The interior design of the upper level is intact in the front section leading on to the balcony. It consists of two rooms with doors to the balcony reminiscent of bedrooms or living rooms in what would have been a shop residence.

This shop also contains a brick-lined cellar accessed via steps at the rear of the building. The cellar runs the entire length of the shop to the Brisbane Street footpath but is not accessible via Brisbane Street. The cellar contains arched supports and the stone foundations are visible.

== Heritage listing ==
William Johnston's Shops were listed on the Queensland Heritage Register on 21 October 1992 having satisfied the following criteria.

The place is important in demonstrating the evolution or pattern of Queensland's history.

The three adjacent two-storey brick shops at 93 Brisbane Street are important in demonstrating the development of Ipswich as a commercial centre in the latter nineteenth century. In about 1877 the first of the brick shops replaced a previous one-storey brick hotel which had stood on the site from the 1840s. The other two shops were constructed before 1893 and the three buildings are of a substantial nature reflecting the growth and the success of the town centre around Brisbane and Limestone Streets since free settlement commenced in 1842.

The place is important because of its aesthetic significance.

This building is also important because of its aesthetic significance as it contributes significantly to the historical and physical centre of Ipswich. It is an integral member of the central townscape made up of many substantial commercial, religious and civic buildings from the 1850s to the 1910s which presented Ipswich as a confident and affluent city and today create the character if the city centre.
