= Keiraville, Ipswich =

Keiraville
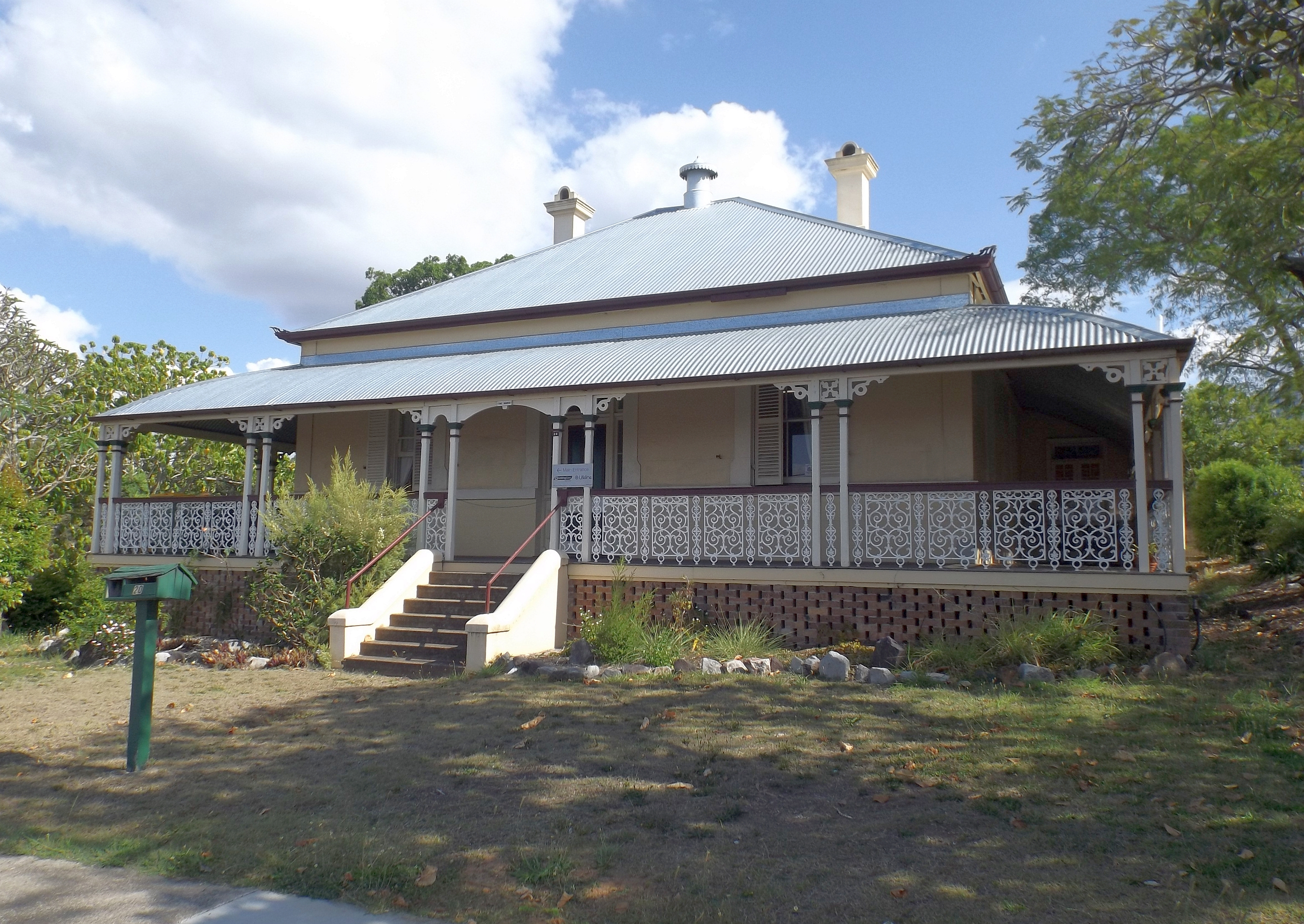
- Building in 2015

- Location within Queensland Location within Australia
- 27.6181°S 152.7608°E
- Location: 20 Roderick Street, Ipswich, City of Ipswich, Queensland, Australia

History
- Design period: 1870s–1890s (late 19th century)
- Built: c. 1880s

Queensland Heritage Register
- Official name: Keiraville
- Type: state heritage (built, landscape)
- Designated: 9 July 1993
- Reference no.: 600597
- Significant period: c. 1880s, 1920s/1930s circa (fabric); 1880s, 1930s–1980s (historical)
- Significant components: service wing, trees/plantings, residential accommodation – main house, steps/stairway, dormitory

Keiraville is a heritage-listed detached house at 20 Roderick Street, Ipswich, City of Ipswich, Queensland, Australia. It was built c. 1880s. It was added to the Queensland Heritage Register on 9 July 1993.

== History ==
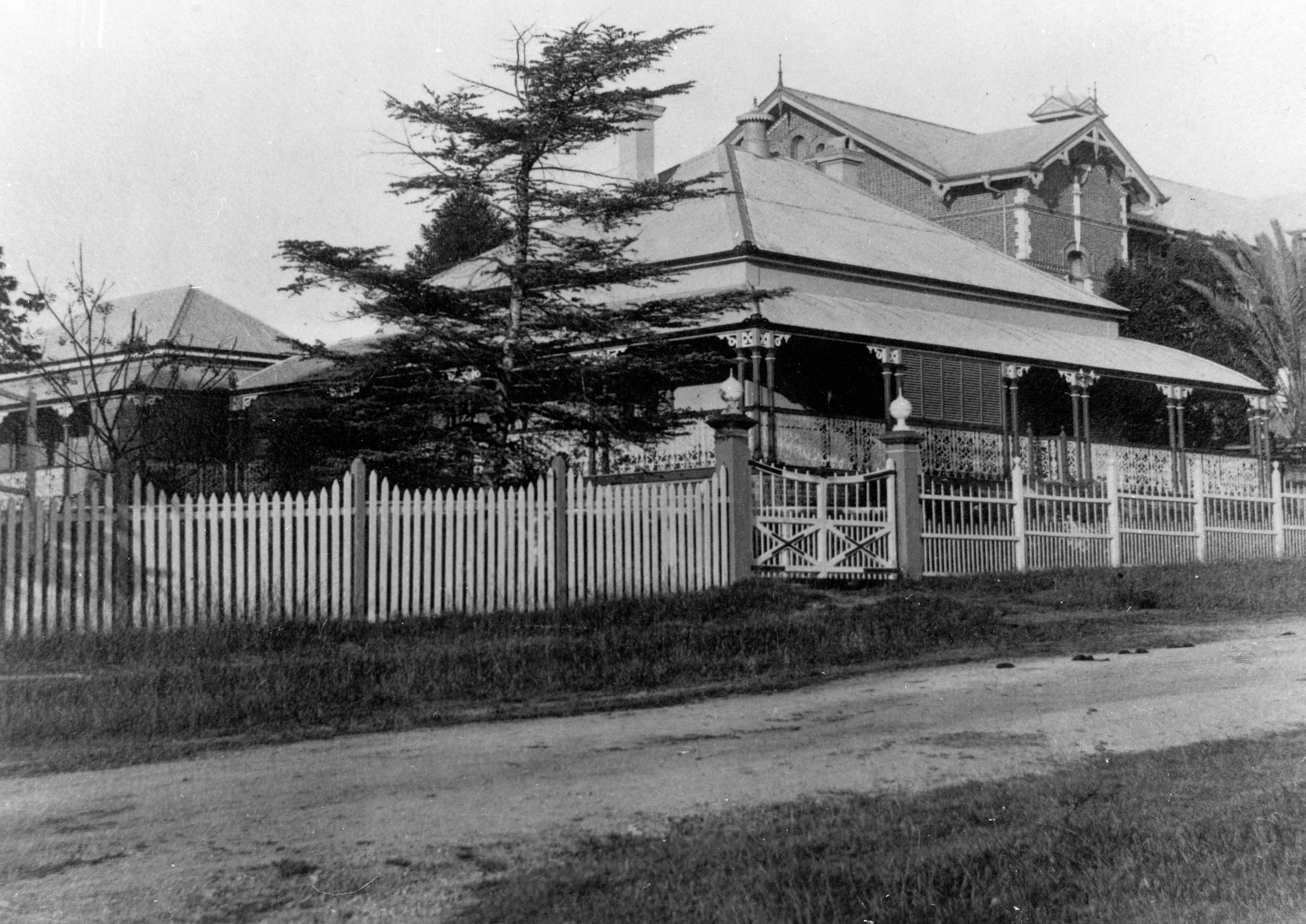
Keiraville built for the Cribb family at Ipswich

Keiraville is a single storeyed rendered masonry house, the first stage of which was probably erected c. 1880s by contractor John MacKenzie. Soon after it was sold to the Cribb family. In 1938, it was sold to the Congregational Church for use as a manse.

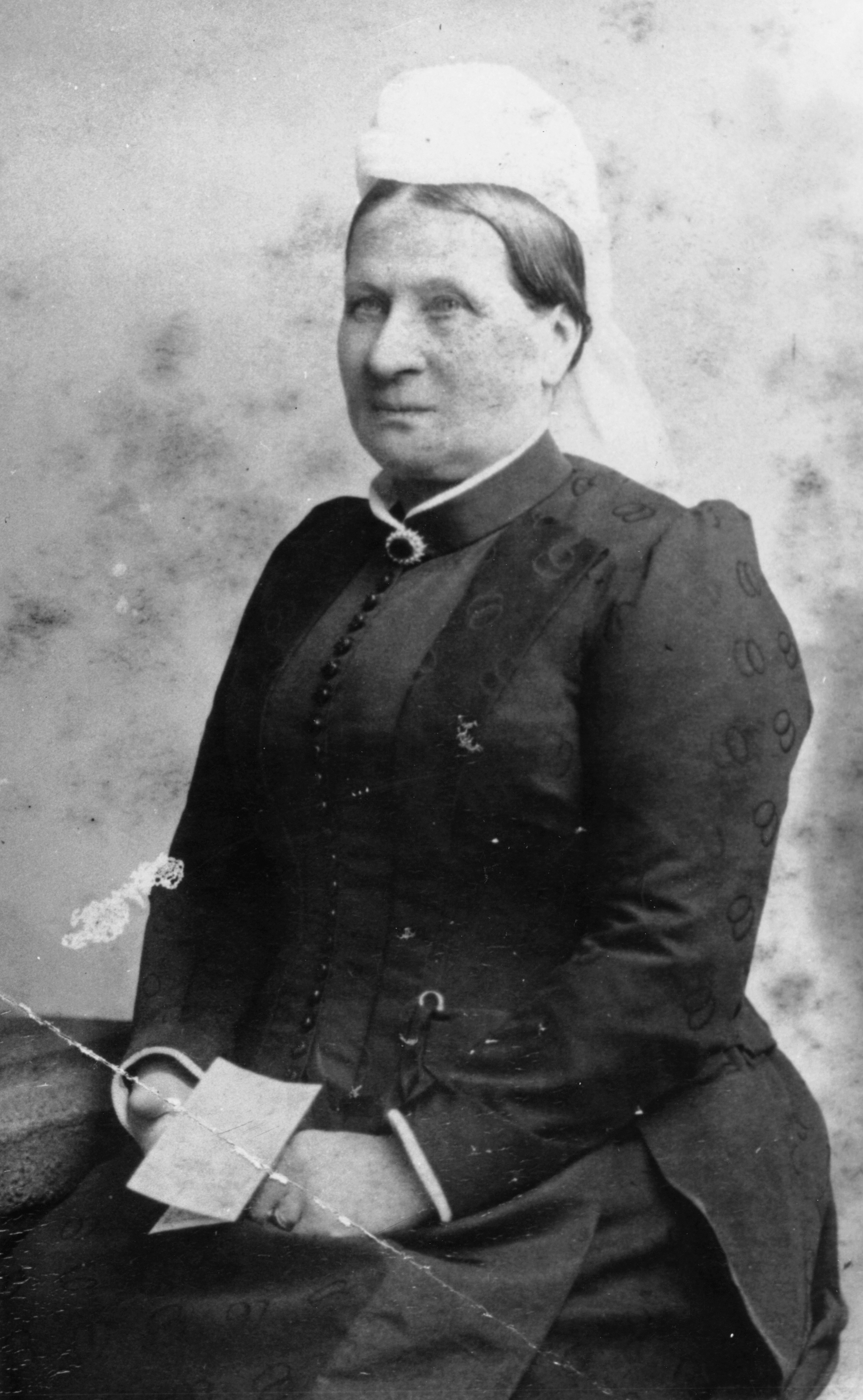
Clarissa Cribb (née Foote)

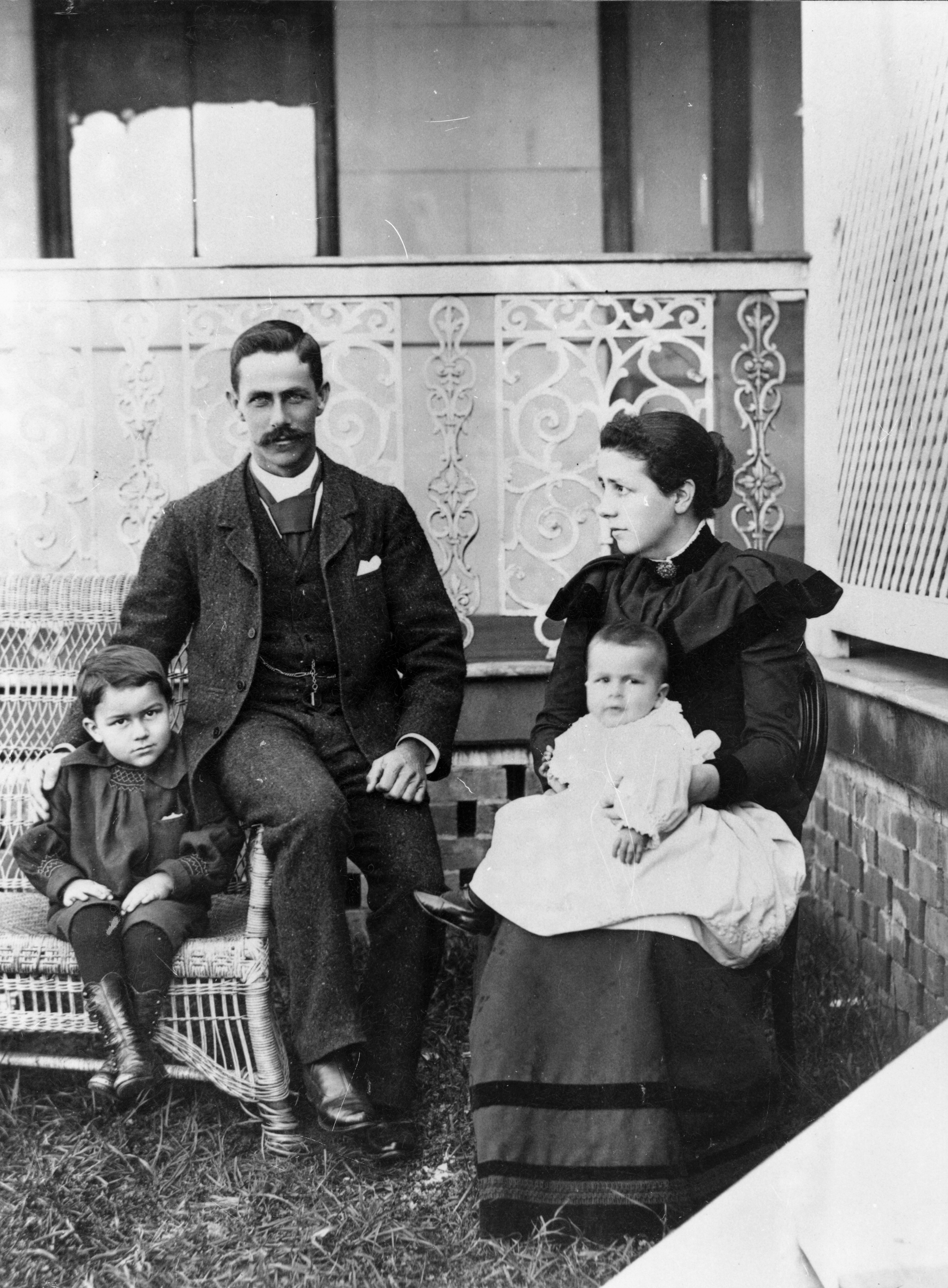
Henry Smart Harry Cribb and family at Keiraville

Allotment 5 on which the house is erected was first proclaimed a town lot in 1884. It was sold in that year to John MacKenzie. In 1888, Clarissa Cribb purchased the allotment, together with the adjoining allotment 4 on the corner of Roderick Street and Warwick Road. The house was lived in by her son Harry Cribb and his wife until 1895. Harry, of the local firm Cribb and Foote, was a well known sportsman and it may have been at this time that the tennis court was erected on allotment 4. In 1891, the property was transferred to Clarissa Spence, the eldest daughter of Clarissa Cribb. Subsequently the property was owned by various members of the Cribb family. From 1913 until the 1920s the house was lived in by Harry's son, Gordon and his family. Gordon was known as a naturalist and erected aviaries in the grounds. In 1919, the property was transferred to Gordon and in 1923, returned to Clarissa Spence. A photograph dated c. 1920s shows a detached building to the rear to the rear of the house. Sometime after this, a wing was added to the south east.

After the death of Clarissa Spence, Keiraville was acquired in 1938 by the Congregational church for use as a manse. The Congregational Church of Ipswich, of which the Cribbs were prominent members, was formed in 1854. Their first church was erected in the following year in Brisbane Street. A second church and parsonage were later erected on the site. After the flood of 1893, the Church purchased property adjoining Kieraville in East Street. In 1895, the new Congregational Hall was erected on the higher ground. Not until 1957 was a church erected on the site, although Keiraville served as the manse for the Congregational Minister for some 40 years after 1938.

The house adjoined the site of the Congregational Church Hall. For some 50 years Kieraville was used as the manse. In 1983, the house became the headquarters for the Blue Nurses. A carpark was constructed on the tennis court site. In 1992, a new wing was added to the rear of the building involving alterations to the house. The house is now used by Lifeline.

== Description ==
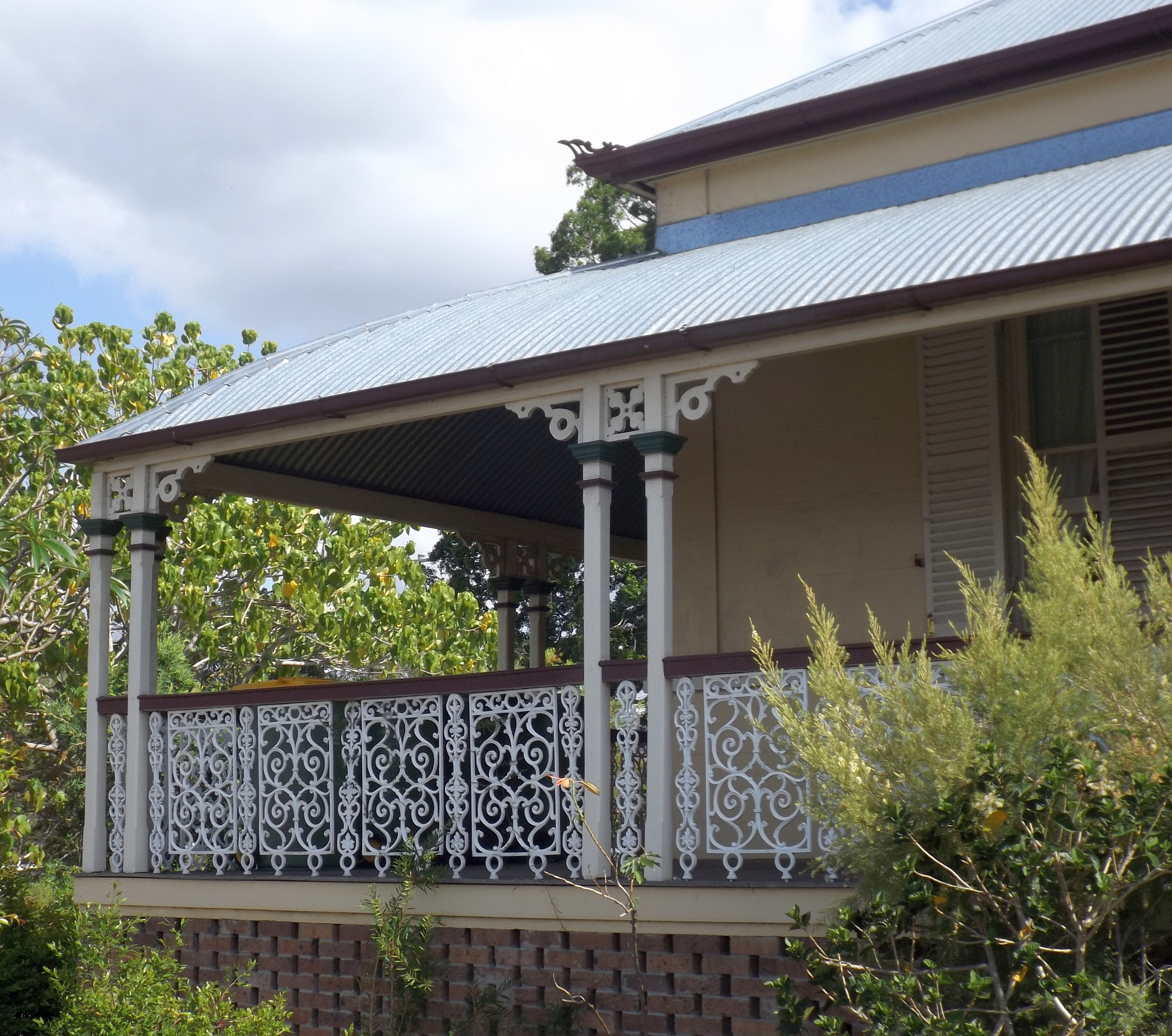
Verandah, 2015

Keiraville is a single-storeyed rendered masonry house with a corrugated iron pyramid roof and timber verandahs on three sides. It has two wings forming a U at the rear of the building which adjoin a new brick extension. It is one of a group of three buildings on the Uniting Church site, being located in the well-treed north-eastern portion.

The verandah has paired timber posts with square capitals and decorative timber valances. It is covered by a curved corrugated iron roof, and has a wrought iron balustrade. The northern Roderick St elevation has a small front yard and a modest entrance (currently not used) consisting of rendered masonry stairs and a timber arch spanning between posts which has the words "The Manse" are inscribed upon it. This northern elevation has timber louvred shutters, while the west and east elevations have glazed timber doors with glazed fanlights above. The building sits on a brick screen base. Two tall rendered masonry chimneys and a metal ventilator rise above the ridge of the roof.

The house has a simple square plan with four rooms around a central corridor. It has timber boarded ceilings throughout, some with metal ceiling roses. The north-east and south-west rooms have fireplaces with timber mantelpieces.

The rendered masonry former kitchen wing is attached to the south-western corner of the main house, and has a hipped roof, and a brick chimney. The south-eastern wing is single skin timber with externally exposed framing, and contains two rooms which may have served as accommodation. The verandah to this wing has been enclosed. The space between the wings has been roofed and enclosed, and now links directly to a new brick extension.

The major alterations to Keiraville have focused on the rear of the building, and when viewed from Roderick Street, Keiraville remains an intact late nineteenth century residence in form and detail. Much of the interior detail of the house also remains intact.

== Heritage listing ==
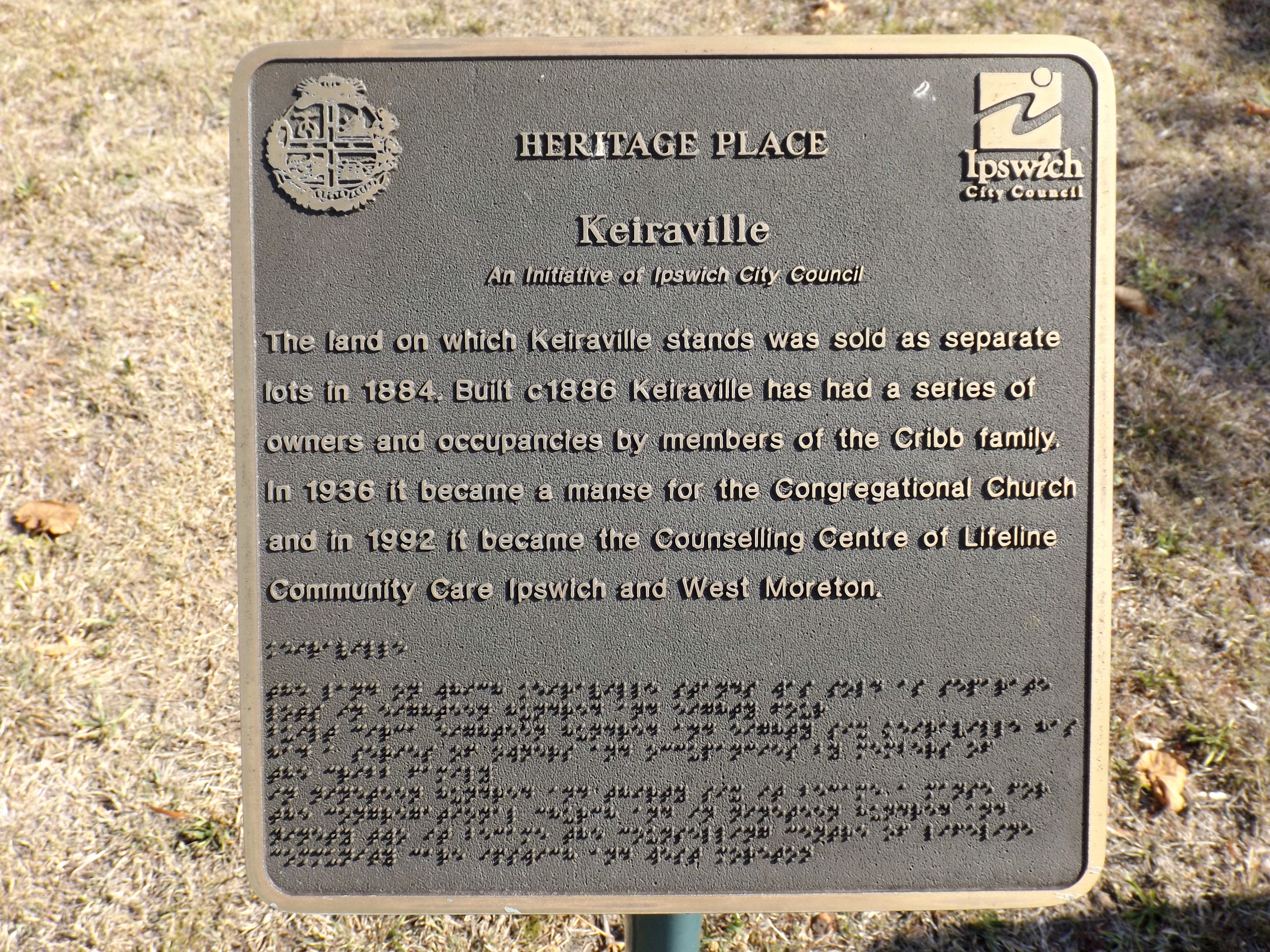
Ipswich City Council plaque

Keiraville was listed on the Queensland Heritage Register on 9 July 1993 having satisfied the following criteria.

The place is important in demonstrating the evolution or pattern of Queensland's history.

Keiraville is important in demonstrating the development of Ipswich, which is part of the pattern of Queensland's history.

The place is important in demonstrating the principal characteristics of a particular class of cultural places.

It demonstrates the principal characteristics of a late 19th century residence and makes a picturesque contribution to the streetscape.

The place is important because of its aesthetic significance.

It demonstrates the principal characteristics of a late 19th century residence and makes a picturesque contribution to the streetscape.

The place has a special association with the life or work of a particular person, group or organisation of importance in Queensland's history.

As a manse for over 40 years, it has a special association with the Congregational Church. It also has a special association with the Cribb family, who were prominent in the development of Ipswich.
