= Blackwall (surname) =

Blackwall is a surname. Notable people with the surname include:

- Anthony Blackwall (1672–1730), English clergyman
- John Blackwall (1790–1881), English naturalist
