= Ulster Hotel =

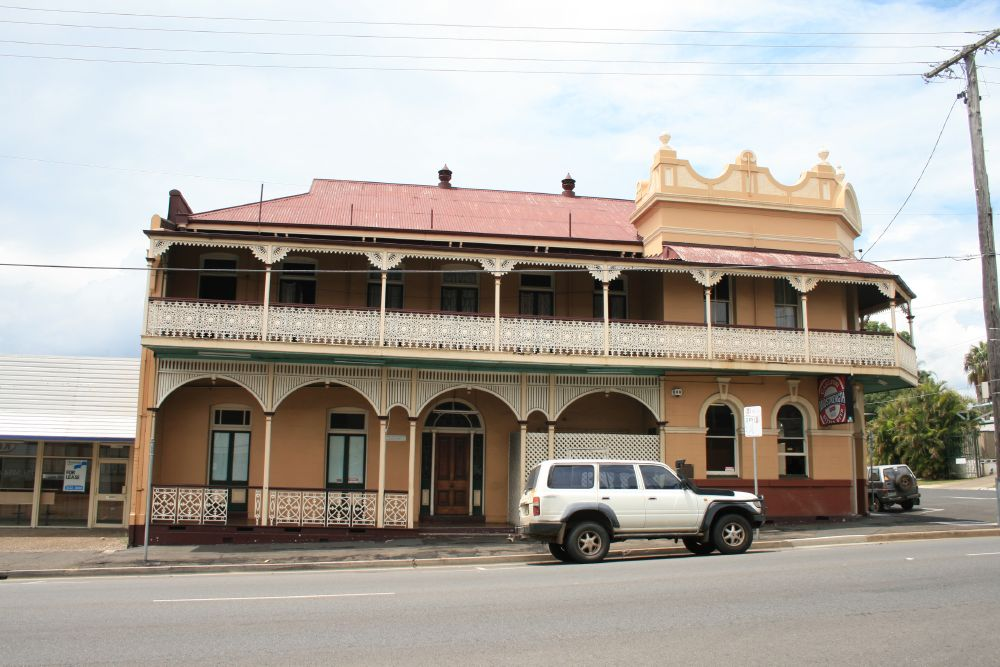
- Ulster Hotel, 2009

- Location within Queensland Location within Australia
- 27.615°S 152.7639°E
- Location: 25 Brisbane Street, Ipswich, City of Ipswich, Queensland, Australia

History
- Design period: 1900–1914 (early 20th century)
- Built: 1910

Queensland Heritage Register
- Official name: Ulster Hotel
- Type: state heritage (built)
- Designated: 21 October 1992
- Reference no.: 600564
- Significant period: 1910s (fabric); 1910-ongoing (historical use)
- Significant components: toilet block/earth closet/water closet, garage

Ulster Hotel is a heritage-listed hotel at 25 Brisbane Street, Ipswich, City of Ipswich, Queensland, Australia. It was built in 1910. It was added to the Queensland Heritage Register on 21 October 1992.

== History ==
The land on which the Ulster Hotel stands, allotment 10 of section 27, was originally purchased by Martin Byrne on 1 November 1851 for £12.

From 1872 the Horse and Jockey hotel was operating on the land in a low-set timber building with a shingle roof and attic windows. The first publican was William Thompson who ran the hotel from 1872 to 1880. Thomas Breen then took over the hotel and changed the name to the Ulster Hotel in 1881 and subsequently the hotel changed hands many times in the last years of the 19th century.

On 19 August 1892 the land was transferred to Patrick O'Sullivan and on 25 October 1892 O'Sullivan took out a bill of mortgage for £2,500. This could suggest that the construction of the present hotel began around this time; however the date on the parapet of the hotel reads 1910 suggesting that the hotel could have been constructed or perhaps rebuilt later. O'Sullivan was a local storekeeper and publican and was one of the first Members of the Queensland Legislative Assembly in 1860, representing various Ipswich electorates until 1892. O'Sullivan came to Australia as a convict in 1848, being transported form County Kerry in Ireland and managed to amass significant property investments in Ipswich.

The construction of a new more substantial hotel on the site of a more modest former establishment during the Federation period was reflective of a widespread renewal of the built environment in Ipswich which reflected the established nature of the city as an important commercial and industrial centre.

The Ulster Hotel was taken over in 1934 over by a publican of special interest named Dan Dempsey. Dempsey was a member of the Kangaroo rugby team and was given the position of manager by the Bulimba Beer Company and the hotel became known locally as "the Dempsey". Dempsey appears to have been a colourful character who flaunted opening hours, using his own and neighbourhood children to keep an eye out for the police while supposedly playing in front of the hotel. During the beer rationing throughout World War II, Dempsey would put on kegs to suit the hours worked by the miners. It was not uncommon for an 18-gallon keg to disappear in 20 minutes when the miners arrived at the hotel at the end of a shift.

Dan Dempsey's daughter, Norma, and her husband Dennis Flannery took over the hotel in 1953 and they still operate and live in the Ulster Hotel at the present time.

== Description ==
The Ulster Hotel is a loadbearing brick two storey building that stands on the corner of Brisbane and Mortimer streets. The building has a hipped roof with a half gable to the western end and decorative iron roof ventilators. The brickwork is rendered with ruled joints. The exterior wall of the public bar is brought forward to the footpath alignment and continues up past the roof of an upper level verandah to form a decorative parapet which addresses the corner. The arch on the parapet at the corner contains the words "Ulster Hotel 1910". The facade of the building then steps back along Brisbane street to form a wider verandah on the first level and ground floor, from which the central entry hall leads into the main part of the building.

The public bar occupies the eastern part of the ground floor of the building. The entrance to the bar on the corner contains early double timber doors with an arched fanlight. A series of double-hung windows with arched heads are situated on either side of the doorway. The door and window openings are emphasised with mouldings at the level of the sill and head with central keystones in each arch. The upper floor verandah is cantilevered out over the footpath with a cast iron balustrade and frieze and a convex roof. Where the building steps back, the parapet ends and the roofline changes to a skillion, separate to the main roof. The ground level verandah has cast iron balustrades with timber fretwork above.

A central hallway is entered from the ground floor verandah. The hall contains a timber staircase with turned timber balustrades, which leads to the upper level. The entrance to the hall features double timber doors with leadlight sidelights and a semi-circular leadlight fanlight. Leading from the hallway to the right is another smaller hall which leads to the public bar and two minor rooms. The interior walls are plastered with timber cornices and architraves and the ceilings are vj boards. The public bar has a pressed metal ceiling and retains the original timber panelled entry doors and timber double- hung windows. The bar fitout is not original and the walls have been lined with timber veneer panelling.

To the left of the main hallway is a space which was originally a large dining room with two small parlours opening onto the street through French doors. The dividing walls between these rooms have been removed but the original doors and windows are intact. A dividing wall has been inserted in the dining room space to form a storeroom. The remainder of the building was not inspected internally.

A single storey kitchen wing with a hipped roof is set at right angles to the building at the rear. A two storey amenities block has been added at the rear of the public bar to provide toilets to the first and second floors. There is a breezeway between this block and the original rear wall. A verandah with a convex roof and timber and iron balustrade detailing is on the first level at the rear of the building. A brick garage with a skillion roof is at the rear of the property accessed from Mortimer Street.

The hotel, situated on a corner site on the gentle slope of Brisbane Street, is a prominent landmark with the streetscape.

It is complemented by a series of three modest timber dwellings, with corrugated iron, pyramid roofing. The two houses closest to the hotel have quite steeply pitched roof slopes

== Heritage listing ==
Ulster Hotel was listed on the Queensland Heritage Register on 21 October 1992 having satisfied the following criteria.

The place is important in demonstrating the evolution or pattern of Queensland's history.

Erected in 1910, the Ulster Hotel demonstrates a period of renewed building activity in Ipswich around the turn of the 20th century being built as a new hotel on the site of a previous hotel. It was one of many substantial public brick buildings constructed during this period and the striking nature of the building also reflects the importance of the local hotel in communities of the era.

The place is important in demonstrating the principal characteristics of a particular class of cultural places.

The Ulster Hotel is a good example of a Queensland Federation Hotel with its original design and detailing still either intact or evident.

The place is important because of its aesthetic significance.

The Ulster Hotel has aesthetic significance for its contribution to the Brisbane Street streetscape because of its size, detailing and prominent corner position and for its architectural value which displays a skilled design approach and fine workmanship.

The place has a strong or special association with a particular community or cultural group for social, cultural or spiritual reasons.

It also has special association with the local community as a place of social activity since the construction of the present hotel in 1910 and the previous hotel on the site since the latter nineteenth century.

The place has a special association with the life or work of a particular person, group or organisation of importance in Queensland's history.

It also has special association with Ipswich businessman Patrick O'Sullivan, a member of the first Queensland Legislative Assembly m1860 and has special association with Dan Dempsey the popular publican in the early 20th century who gave the pub the nickname the "Dempsey" and his family who still run the pub today.
