= Wilton Windmill =

Windmill in Grafton, Wiltshire, England

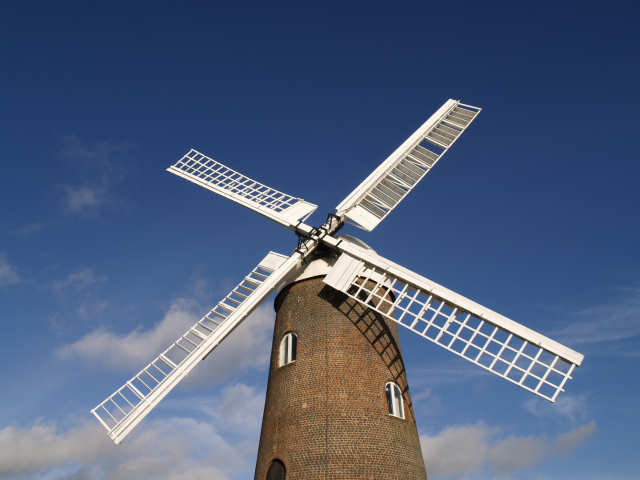
- Wilton Windmill
- Interactive map of Wilton Windmill

Origin
- Mill location: Wilton
- Coordinates: 51.3519°N 1.6065°W
- Year built: 1821

Information
- Purpose: Corn mill
- Type: Tower mill
- Storeys: Five storeys
- No. of sails: Four
- Type of sails: Two Common sails, two Patent sails
- Windshaft: Cast iron
- Winding: Fantail
- Fantail blades: Six
- No. of pairs of millstones: Two pairs

The Wilton Windmill is a five-floor brick tower mill, standing on a chalk ridge between the villages of Wilton and Great Bedwyn in the southern English county of Wiltshire.

== History ==
The mill was built in 1821 because the construction of the Kennet and Avon Canal had included the canalisation of the River Bedwyn which had previously powered several water mills in the area.

The windmill was in use for a century, continuing into the 1920s, but fell into disuse, probably as the result of competition from large steam roller mills. In the 1960s it was added to the list of buildings of architectural or historical merit as Grade II*. In 1971 it was bought by Wiltshire County Council and leased to the Wiltshire Historic Buildings Trust, which early in 1972 began to restore it to working condition. By the end of the summer of 1976 the windmill was once again making flour.

It is now owned by Wiltshire Council and managed by the Wilton Windmill Society, formed in 1976 and operated entirely by volunteers. In the 1980s the mill was in financial difficulties, which led to the Society forming a cricket XI, the Wilton Millers' Cricket Team, to raise funds by playing sponsored matches, and in 2011 this was still in existence, although no longer needed for fundraising.

Flour, made from locally grown wheat, is still produced at the mill and can be bought on site and in local shops.

== Sails ==
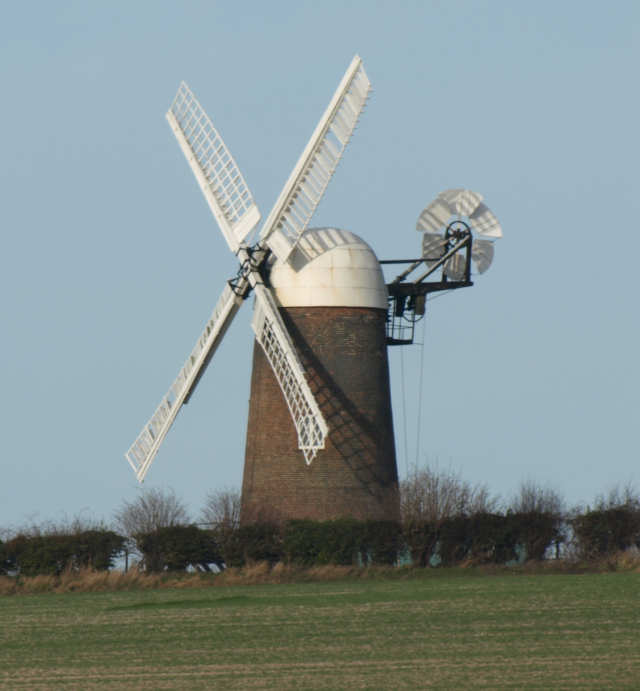
Sails and fantail

As when it was first constructed, the mill has a fantail, which causes the cap bearing the sails to turn to make best use of the available wind. Of the four sails, two are of canvas and two are more complicated "patent sails", each consisting of twenty-two sections which can be angled.

== Location ==
Position: grid reference SU275616

Nearby towns and cities: Hungerford, Marlborough, Newbury, Swindon

Nearby villages: Wilton, East Grafton, Great Bedwyn, Burbage, Shalbourne, Pewsey

Nearby places of interest: Crofton Pumping Station, Kennet and Avon Canal, Wilton Water, Pewsey White Horse

== Culture and media ==
Wilton Windmill featured in an episode of Victorian Farm Christmas, first aired on BBC Two on 11 December 2009. It also appeared in the short film Jerusalem starring pop group The Style Council, filmed in 1986 for a direct to video release in 1987; in the film the band performs the song Heaven's Above at the windmill.

== See also ==
- List of windmills in Wiltshire
