= River Dun (River Kennet) =

River in Wiltshire and Berkshire, England

River Dun Bedwyn Brook
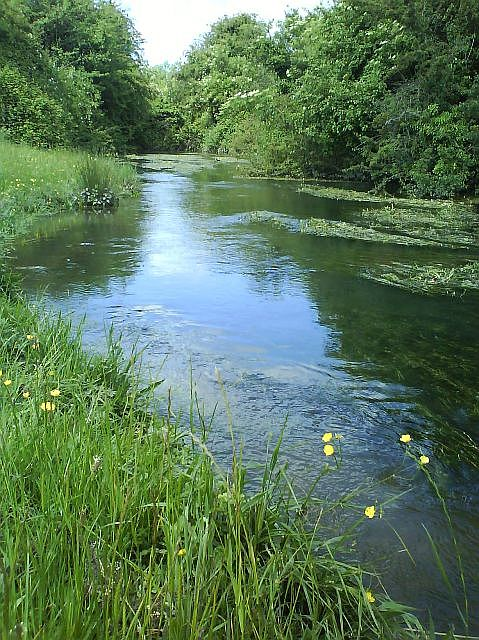
- River Dun at Freeman's Marsh, above Hungerford

Location
- Country: England
- Counties: Wiltshire, Berkshire
- Towns: Great Bedwyn, Hungerford

Physical characteristics
- Source
  - location: Great Bedwyn, Wiltshire, United Kingdom
  - coordinates: 51.37109°N 1.60664°W
  - elevation: 120 m (390 ft)
- Mouth: River Kennet
  - location: Hungerford, Berkshire, United Kingdom
  - coordinates: 51.412169°N 1.494023°W
  - elevation: 90 m (300 ft)
- Length: 16 km (9.9 mi)

The River Dun (historically known as Bedwyn Brook) is a tributary of the River Kennet, flowing through Wiltshire and Berkshire in England. Its main source is in the parish of Great Bedwyn, Wiltshire and it flows 16 kilometres (10 mi) in a northeasterly direction into Berkshire. It discharges into the Kennet at Hungerford.

The Dun valley is an important transport route through the high chalklands between the London Basin to the east and the Vale of Pewsey to the west. It is the route by which the Kennet and Avon Canal (linking London and Bristol) enters the Thames basin from the Vale of Pewsey, crossing the watershed with the aid of the Bruce Tunnel and Crofton Pumping Station. The later Reading to Plymouth railway linking London and the south-west also follows the valley.

The Dun has two named tributaries: the Froxfield Stream joins on the left between Little Bedwyn and Hungerford, and the Shalbourne Stream on the right above Hungerford. During or after the building of the Kennet and Avon Canal in the late 18th century, the Shalbourne was diverted into it. In 2000 the stream was returned to its original course, rejoining the Dun via a culvert under the canal. The water quality of the River Dun was assessed as 'good' in 2019, as a result of several projects carried out in the 21st century to reduce the volumes of nutrients and sediment entering the river and to improve the habitat.

== Course ==
The River Dun rises on the south side of the A338 road near East Grafton, a little above the 490-foot (150 m) contour. It passes under the road to the parish church and the A338 road, and runs alongside East Grafton sewage treatment works. As it approaches Dark Lane, it is joined by an unnamed tributary on its left bank, which rises from two points to the north and south-east of West Grafton. The stream turns to the north-east, and soon enters a reservoir called Wilton Water. The reservoir was created in 1836 by John Blackwell, who constructed a dam across the river further downstream. The water was used to supplement that in the Kennet and Avon Canal which opened in 1810, but lacked an adequate water supply. The water is pumped into the canal by the Grade I listed Crofton Pumping Station, which contains two steam-powered beam engines, one dating from 1812 and the other from 1843. The feeder to the pumping station leaves Wilton Water and passes under the canal.

The outfall from the reservoir, which maintains the flow in the River Dun, is Grade II listed and consists of three sluices, two of which feed the river, while the third feeds the pumping station. A syphon under the towpath enables the water to reach the pumping station. The outfall continues in a north-easterly direction, separated from the canal by the towpath. Just before Crofton Crossing Bridge, the river splits into two parallel channels, beyond which its course is not shown on Ordnance Survey maps, because the river, railway and canal are so close together.

The river reappears on maps between Beech Grove Lock and Mill Bridge, on the north side of the railway. At Mill Bridge, it passes under the railway, and continues to the north-east, hemmed in by the canal and the railway. It is crossed by the continuation of Church Lock accommodation bridge, by Bedwyn Wharf Bridge as it reaches Great Bedwyn, and by Burnt Mill footbridge at the north end of the village. At Little Bedwyn it passes under the railway and is crossed by Little Bedwyn Bridge and footbridge. It then returns to the south side of the railway. Fore Bridge is the next to cross, and the river passes beneath the canal just before Froxfield Middle Lock. It is joined on its left bank by Froxfield Stream, which rises to the west of the village of Froxfield, is crossed by the A4 road in the village, and then passes under the railway and canal to join the river. There is a large lake containing watercress beds just before Froxfield Bridge.

Near Froxfield its course turns towards the east and enters Berkshire. The county boundary follows the course of the river for a short distance after Froxfield Bridge, and then turns to the south. Picketfield railway bridge carries the railway over the canal and river, after which the river passes beneath the canal through Dun Aqueduct. The river forms multiple channels as it passes through an area of rough wet grassland known as Freeman's Marsh. This is a nature reserve owned by the Town and Manor of Hungerford, and is notable for its population of water voles, together with a variety of resident and visiting birds. Since 1986 it has been a Site of Special Scientific Interest for its diversity of 'wet meadow' habitats.

The River Shalbourne rises from three sources, one to the west of the village of Shalbourne, while the other two are to the east and north of the small village of Ham. They form a single stream to the north of Mill Lane Shalbourne, before they are crossed by the A338 road. There are five minor crossings before the Shalbourne reaches the western edge of Hungerford, where it is culverted beneath the railway and the canal to reach the right bank of the Dun. In Hungerford, the A338 Bridge Street crosses the Dun and the River Kennet approaches on the left side. They split apart a little, skirting around a trout farm. The river passes under Dun Mill, and is crossed by a late 18th century bridge, with two small arches and one large arch. Historic England describe it as crossing the River Kennet, but the River Dun joins the main channel of the Kennet on its right bank a short distance below the bridge.

== History ==
The river has supplied water power to at least two watermills in Hungerford. Town Mill stood just upstream of the A338 bridge. There were two mills in the town in 1275, one of which was at this site, and the other was probably at Eddington, on the River Kennet just above its confluence with the Dun. Much of Hungerford was burnt down by a large fire in 1566 and Town Mill was completely destroyed. The miller sought legal redress for "the negligence of his neighbours" in causing the fire, and rebuilt the mill at a cost of £100. The legal document ensured that all grain in the manor of Hungerford had to be ground at Town Mill. It continued to grind corn until the First World War, when it closed and became derelict. It was demolished in 1932 by Mr Turner of Hyngerford Park.

The earliest records for Dun Mill, just above the confluence with the Kennet, date from 1406. It was a fulling mill or tucking mill, involved in processing homespun cloth. It continued to do this until around the 1690s, when in 1691 the owner of Town Mill brought an action against the miller at Dun Mill because he was grinding corn there. The court ruled that the mill should be turned back into a tucking mill or pulled down, but neither option was implemented, and the mill continued to grind corn. A survey of the mill in 1963 reported that the internal machinery had been removed, although the building was structurally sound. The mill was sold in 1979 as part of the adjacent trout farm, when it was stated that parts of the building dated from the 16th century, before it became a corn mill, although the miller's house was Georgian.

Berkshire Trout Farm was constructed within the grounds of Dun Mill. Work began in 1900, and the 50 stock ponds took over four years to excavate. A hatchery was added in 1904, and the enterprise, which was owned by the Peart family, began trading in 1907. Water for the ponds is obtained from the RIver Dun, from two chalk springs nearby, and from an artesian well which is 300 feet (91 m) deep. The river valley upstream of the site has been owned by the Town and Manor of Hungerford since 1200, and they have prevented industrial development along it, to protect the water supply. The business initially supplied brown and rainbow trout to owners of chalk streams in the south of England, but improved transportation and aeration systems have allowed them to supply fish throughout the country. Some 10 million eggs are hatched each year, and around 3 million of these are grown on at the hatchery.

== Hydrology ==
Historically, the River Dun and its tributaries have suffered from poor water quality, but several projects to improve this have been undertaken in the 21st century. The Dun, Shalbourne and Froxfield Stream are all chalk streams, but significant volumes of nutrients and sediment enter the rivers, and are transported downstream to enter the River Kennet and the Kennet and Avon Canal. Most of them are designated main rivers, including the whole of the Froxfield Stream, most of the River Shalbourne from Mill Lane in Shalbourne northwards, and the lower reaches of the River Dun, but only as far as Froxfield Bridge. The Environment Agency is responsible for managing flood risk on main rivers. The upper reaches of the Dun are thus ordinary watercourses, and do not benefit from Environment Agency maintenance.

The Dun is known to have been stocked with trout for fishing in the past, and it is thought that there is probably a residual population of trout surviving in the river. However, when the Wild Trout Trust visited in January 2014, to advise on habitat improvement, the canal was overflowing and running into the river in several places. This has resulted in fine sediment being deposited over the gravel bed, creating conditions that are not ideal for fish spawning. Water quality has been an issue for many years, and there was a particularly bad incident in 1998, which resulted in around 150 tonnes of fish being killed. A toxic microbe was suspected to be the main cause, and its activity was linked to dredging, exacerbated by the flow regime on the canal. The canal was closed and extensive testing was carried out by the Environment Agency, who discovered that hydrogen peroxide neutralised the toxin. Sections of the canal were treated with hydrogen peroxide, and it was opened once the water was shown not to harm fish. Steps were then taken to prevent water from the canal entering the river.

The River Shalbourne begins near Shalbourne, where there are springs in the Upper Greensand Formation. To the north this is covered by a layer of chalk, and the river flows across chalk for most of its 3.7-mile (6.0 km) length. It passes through agricultural land until it reaches Hungerford. When the Kennet and Avon Canal was built in the late 1700s, the river was diverted into the canal, to provide an extra source of water. In 2000, the river was disconnected from the canal and rerouted back to its original course. A new culvert was constructed under the canal, to allow it to rejoin the River Dun. This resulted in improvements to water quality both on the lower River Shalbourne and the lower River Dun. However, the culvert presents an obstacle to fish migration, which still needs to be addressed.

Water quality in the Dun has been affected by continual interchange of water between the canal and the river. River water was used to top up the canal, and surplus canal water re-entered the river through overflow weirs. Water in the canal moves much more slowly, and tends to have high levels of turbidity. In order to improve the situation, bywash weirs were constructed around seven locks between 2012 and 2015, so that the canal water would stay in the canal except in exceptional circumstances. As a result, water quality has improved, resulting in growth of aquatic plant populations and improvements in silt deposition.

In 2012, the Action for the River Kennet group introduced a "Southern Streams" project, which sought to identify causes of pollution in the rivers and to implement solutions. Much of it was found to be from diffuse sources, where nutrients and sediment are washed into the rivers from agricultural land. They have used the government's Catchment Sensitive Farming service to help riparian landowners understand the issues and implement changes to reduce runoff. In 2019 this led to the formation of a Southern Streams farmer group, where those involved in agriculture could share their knowledge of practices which have been implemented. The group concentrates on issues of water quality.

Another tranche of improvements were made in 2021 and early 2022 after the North West Downs Area of Outstanding Natural Beauty was awarded £400,000 from the Green Recovery Challenge Fund. This funded their "Sparkling Streams" project, which sought to make further improvements to the River Kennet and its tributaries. The Dun and the Shalboune benefitted from a project to enhance habitats in the river and along its banks at eight sites, with a combined length of 1.9 miles (3 km). Hedges and woodlands were planted at six sites, and volunteers built a rain garden at Shalbourne Primary School. 381 adults and 60 children were involved in the activities.

Other projects have created a Larinier fish pass at Bearwater, just upstream of the A338 bridge in Hungerford, fencing to reduce livestock entering the river at Freeman's Marsh, where a small weir was removed to increase fish movement along the river, and introducing meanders back into the river at Bearwood. On the Shalbourne, a weir near its mouth was altered to improve fish movement, and changes were made at Stype Mill, again to allow fish to move around the structure more easily. On the Froxfield Stream, a new wetland was created, to process surface water from the A4 road, and several barriers to fish migration were removed. Like the Shalbourne, the river enters a syphon to pass beneath the canal, which still limits fish movement.

== Water quality ==
The Environment Agency measures the water quality of the waterways in England. Each is given an overall ecological status, which may be one of five levels: high, good, moderate, poor and bad. There are several components that are used to determine this, including biological status, which looks at the quantity and varieties of invertebrates, angiosperms and fish. Chemical status, which compares the concentrations of various chemicals against known safe concentrations, is rated good or fail.

The water quality of the River Dun system was as follows in 2019.

| Section | Ecological Status | Chemical Status | Length | Catchment |
|---|---|---|---|---|
| Upper Dun | Good | Fail | 6.3 miles (10.1 km) | 17.08 square miles (44.2 km^{2}) |
| Kennet and Avon Canal and Dun above Hungerford | Good | Fail | 3.9 miles (6.3 km) | 2.49 square miles (6.4 km^{2}) |
| Froxfield Stream | Moderate | Fail | 2.1 miles (3.4 km) | 20.15 square miles (52.2 km^{2}) |
| Shalbourne (source to Kennet at Hungerford) | Moderate | Fail | 4.6 miles (7.4 km) | 7.83 square miles (20.3 km^{2}) |

The quality of water in Froxfield Stream and the River Shalbourne is less than 'good' because it is affected by discharges from sewage treatment plants. The River Shalbourne is also affected by runoff of nutrients from agricultural and rural land, and by modification to the river channel, both of which are detrimental to fish populations. Like most waterways in the UK, the chemical status changed from 'good' to 'fail' in 2019, due to the presence of polybrominated diphenyl ethers (PBDE) which had not previously been included in the assessment.

== Bibliography ==
- ARK (2023). "Southern Streams". Kennet Catchment Partnership.
- Blackmore, Mike (April 2014). "River Dun, Froxfield, Wiltshire". Wild Trout Trust.
- Neal, Colin; House, W. Alan; Jarvie, Helen P.; Neal, Margaret; Hill, Linda; Wickham, Heather (15 May 2005). "Phosphorus concentrations in the River Dun, the Kennet and Avon Canal and the River Kennet, southern England". Science of the Total Environment. 344. Elsevier: 107–128. doi:10.1016/j.scitotenv.2005.02.009.
- Nicholson (2006). Nicholson Guides Vol 7: River Thames & the Southern Waterways. Harper Collins. ISBN 978-0-00-721115-9.
