= Hungerford police murders =

Police murders in Berkshire, England

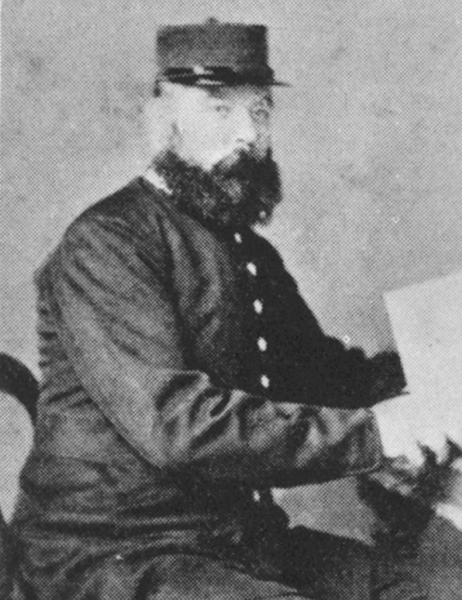
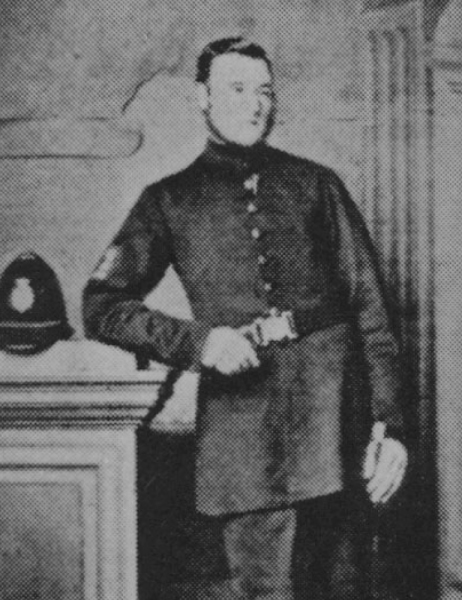
- Drewitt (left) and Shorter (right)
- Date: 11 December 1876
- Time: c. 22:30 (GMT)
- Location: Eddington, Berkshire, UK; 51°25′32″N 01°30′04″W
- Target: Inspector Joseph Drewitt; PC Thomas Shorter
- Participants: Henry Tidbury; Francis Tidbury
- Deaths: 2
- Trial: February 1877
- Verdict: Guilty
- Convictions: Murder
- Sentence: Execution by hanging

On 11 December 1876, Inspector Joseph Drewitt and PC Thomas Shorter were murdered near Hungerford in Berkshire, United Kingdom. The officers were in the area on unrelated business and happened upon brothers Henry and Francis Tidbury, who had been game poaching. The brothers beat and shot the officers to death.

Henry and Francis were arrested the following morning. They were tried at Reading in February 1877, and were found guilty of both murders. They were hanged at Reading Jail on 12 March 1877.

== Murders ==
On the evening of 11 December 1876, brothers Henry (born 1851) and Francis Tidbury (born 1858) had been game poaching near Eddington, Berkshire, and were on their way home to Hungerford. At 22:10 GMT, Inspector Joseph Drewitt, the officer-in-charge of Hungerford police station, had set out to meet PC Thomas Shorter, who was the village constable of Great Shefford. Their meeting point was Folly Crossroads on the Besselsleigh turnpike, approximately 1 mile (1.6 km) from Hungerford. After this rendezvous, Drewitt was scheduled to meet PC William Golby in Hungerford.

At approximately 22:30, Drewitt happened upon the brothers; Henry shot him. Shorter was by then in the area, and Francis shot at him but missed. Shorter ran south in the direction of Hungerford, but the brothers caught him and beat him to death. At some point he too was shot. The brothers returned to where Drewitt lay; he was alive and they continued to beat him with their guns.

After Drewitt failed to make the planned meeting back in Hungerford, Golby walked up Eddington Hill, the direction from which Drewitt would have been approaching. He came across Shorter's body, later describing how "his head was battered to pieces and his brains was scattered all over the grass." Golby alerted the local toll keeper and requested police support from Newbury and Kintbury. At about 03:00 on 12 December, Kintbury's PC Charles Brown found Drewitt's body on Denford Lane, east of the crossroads. Both bodies were taken to the John O'Gaunt Inn in Hungerford.

== Victims ==
Drewitt (Note: An alternative spelling of Drewitt is Drewett.) was born in 1834 in Welford. With his wife Hannah (née Moss), he had four children. Shorter was born in 1852 and came from Bray. The officers were buried at St Saviour's Church in Eddington on 16 December.

== Investigation and trial ==
Superintendent George Bennett travelled from Newbury at 05:00 on 12 December to begin investigating. At 07:00, police arrested 39-year-old Eddington ferreter William Day, who had been seen the previous night by the keeper of Eddington toll gate. Day's brother-in-law, William Tidbury, was also arrested along with his brothers Henry and Francis. (Note: Day has alternatively been stated to be William Tidbury's father-in-law.) Police had found various items at the scene belonging to the suspects, including Henry Tidbury's hat and William Day's ferret line. Shot extracted from Drewitt's wound also appeared to match that owned by Day. On 5 January 1877, Henry admitted his guilt to PC Brown. William maintained his innocence in the murders, stating that he met Henry who told him that he had "killed two policemen".

The trial began at Reading on 19 February 1877. William Day and William Tidbury were both found not guilty. The jury considered that William Tidbury may be guilty of being an accessory after the fact, but he had not had that charge levied against him and he was released. Henry and Francis were found guilty of murdering both officers, but recommended mercy for Drewitt's murder because it was not premeditated and because Francis was aged 19. The judge, Justice Lindley, sentenced the brothers to be hanged. While awaiting execution at Reading Jail, the brothers both wrote confessions to the murders. They stated that after shooting two pheasants and a jay, they began walking home and were surprised by the officers, whom they shot and beat to death.

[The policemen] caught hold of me. Then we had a struggle. He said "Tidbury, is that you?", and I found that we could not get away. Then I shot him and he fell down. The other policeman caught hold of us. He found that we was too much for him. Then he ran away. Then my brother and me run [sic] after him and hit him with our guns, and we hit him when he was down and killed him. Then we went back and [...] Mr Drewett was staggering in the road and I hit again with my gun, but I don't know whether my brother hit or not – that he knows but Mr Drewett said "don't kill a man"; but we took no notice.

— Henry Tidbury, confession of the murders of Joseph Drewett and Thomas Shorter, Newbury Weekly News (10 March 1877)

=== Executions ===
At 08:00 on 12 March 1877, Henry and Francis were hanged simultaneously at Reading Jail by William Marwood, who earned £17 (equivalent to £1,713 in 2025) including expenses. One newspaper said that the men "walked to the scaffold with tolerable firmness", (Note: Rather than a scaffold, the execution room at Reading Jail had an 8-foot-deep (2.4 m) pit beneath trap doors on the floor in a similar configuration to the execution room at Newgate Prison.) although the report in the Reading Mercury stated that after entering the execution room, "Francis screamed when he saw the two ropes hanging down." The brothers repeated the Lord's Prayer after it had been recited by the chaplain. The brothers said "amen", and Francis – who was visibly more emotional than Henry – added "Lord have mercy upon me, Christ have mercy upon me." There was a silence of less than a minute before one of the brothers exclaimed "Hallelujah!". The trapdoor bolt was then released and both brothers were dropped approximately six and a half feet (2.0 m).

After they were certified dead, Henry and Francis were buried in the prison cemetery beside child murderer John Gould. A crowd of approximately 500 was present outside the prison when a black flag was raised to signify the execution had been carried out.

Their executions were the first at Reading since the hanging of Gould in 1862, and were the first at Reading to be held out of view of the general public.

== Legacy ==
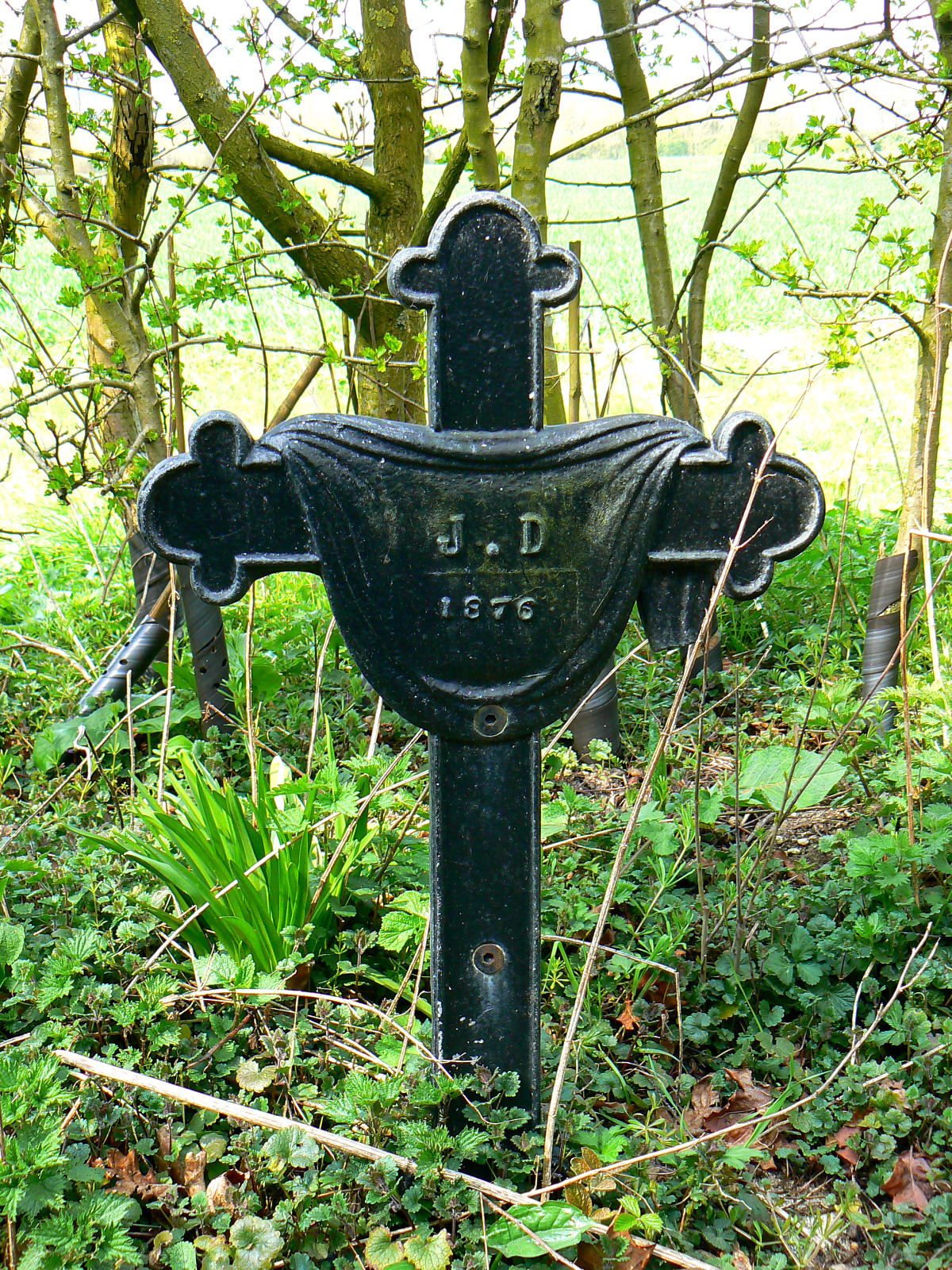
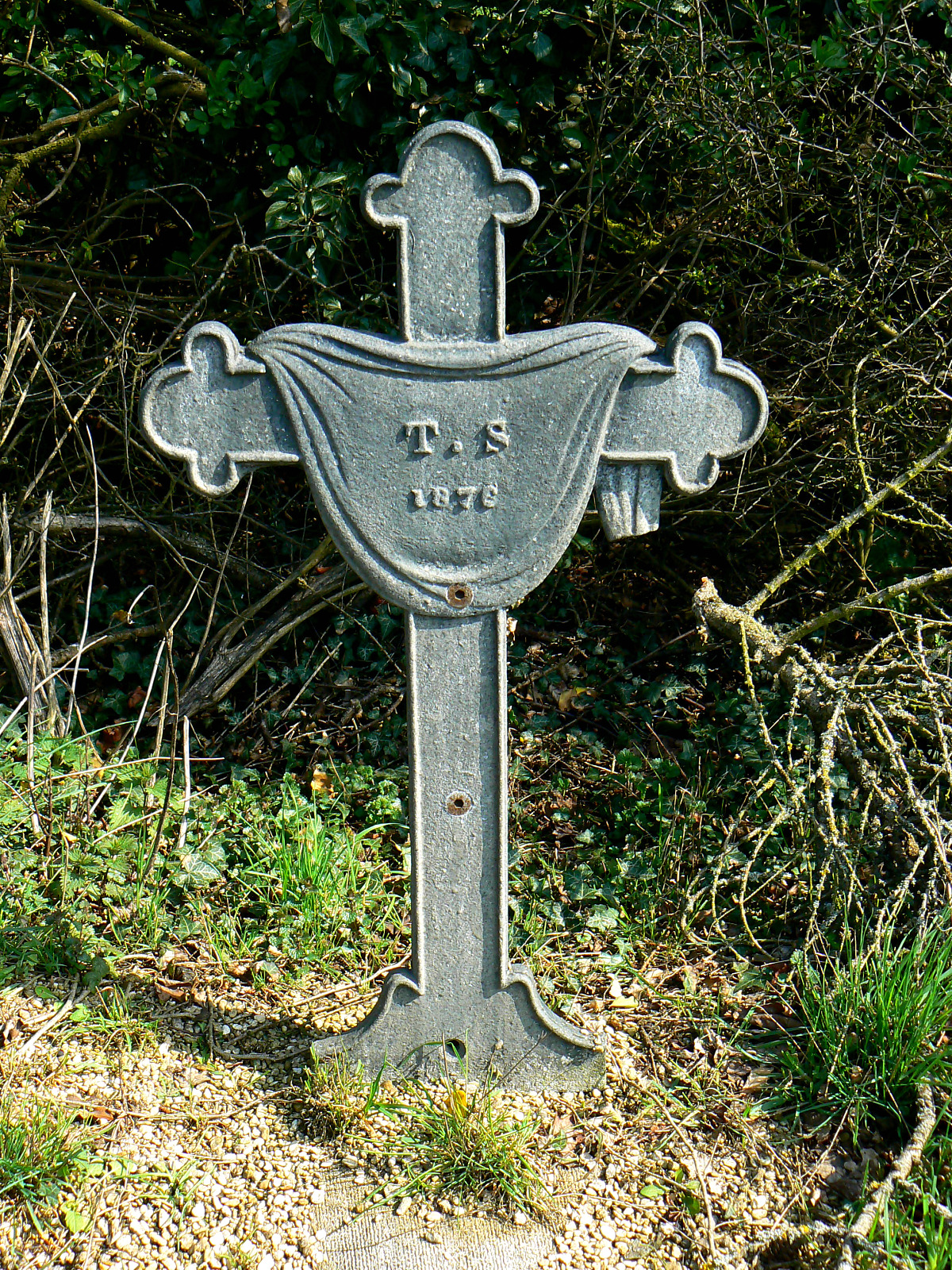
The memorial crosses dedicated to Drewitt ("J.D") and Shorter ("T.S") at Folly Crossroads

After the murders, a public subscription raised money for the widows and children of the officers. Golby received a promotion to sergeant.

Memorial crosses were placed at the sites of Drewitt's and Shorter's deaths. These have been replaced on multiple occasions after damage or theft.

The murders were the last in the Hungerford vicinity for 111 years, until the 1987 Hungerford massacre.
