= Potter's Lock, Wiltshire =

Canal lock in Wiltshire, England

Coordinates: 51.38692°N 1.58751°W

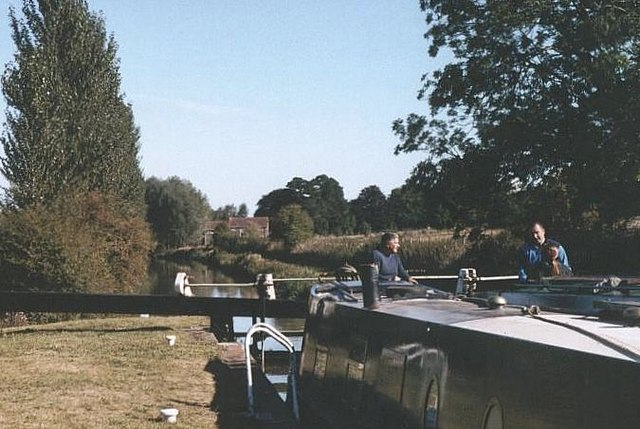
Potter's Lock

Potter's Lock is on the Kennet and Avon Canal, at Bedwyn, Wiltshire, England.

The lock has a rise/fall of 7 ft 6 in (2.28 m).

== See also ==
- Locks on the Kennet and Avon Canal

Next lock upstream	Kennet and Avon Canal	Next lock downstream
Burnt Mill Lock	Potter's Lock, Wiltshire; Grid reference: SU288654	Little Bedwyn Lock
