= Crofton Locks =

Canal locks in Wiltshire, England

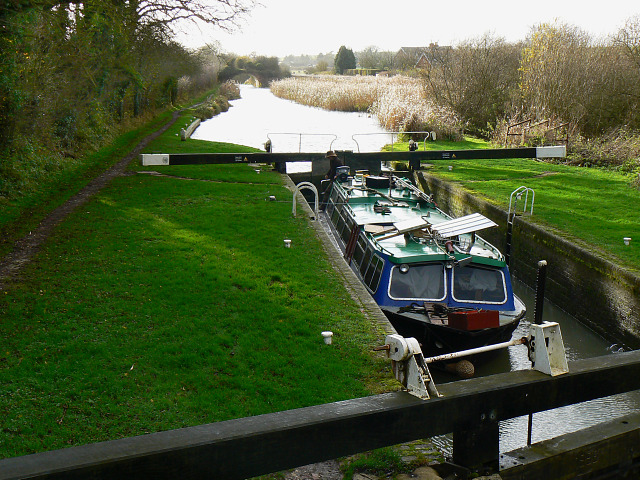
- Beech Grove Lock No.63, the bottom lock of the Crofton flight
- Interactive map of Crofton Locks
- 51.358°N 1.636°W
- Waterway: Kennet and Avon Canal
- Maintained by: Canal & River Trust
- Operation: Manual
- First built: 1810
- Length: 70 feet (21.3 m)
- Width: 13 feet 2 inches (4.01 m)
- Fall: 61 feet (19 m)
- Flight of 9 locks

Crofton Locks are a flight of locks on the Kennet and Avon Canal, near the village of Great Bedwyn, Wiltshire, England. The canal was built and opened in stages between 1798 and 1810. Crofton Locks were part of the last stage to be started, from Pewsey and Great Bedwyn, and opened in 1810. Had John Rennie's original plans been followed, most of the flight would not have been built, as the canal would have been in tunnel at a lower level.

To cope with the higher level of the revised plans, Crofton Pumping Station was constructed in 1809, to pump water from springs to Crofton Top Lock and the short summit pound of the canal. The first beam engine was supplemented by a second in 1812, and the first was replaced in 1846. They are now the oldest beam engines still working in their original locations. Water supply to the pumping station was increased in 1836 by constructing Wilton Water, a reservoir which is fed by local springs.

Traffic through the locks virtually ceased by the 1920s, and the last known transit by a narrowboat was in 1951, just before the canal closed. Determined efforts by the Kennet and Avon Canal Trust, formed in 1961, aided by working parties from the Waterway Recovery Group resulted in restoration starting. Crofton Locks were reopened by the Vice Chairman of British Waterways in October 1988, 12 years later than first hoped, and the whole canal was formally reopened by Queen Elizabeth II in 1990. A major project to upgrade the pumping station, which normally uses electric pumps, was carried out between 2020 and 2023, but the beam engines are still steamed occasionally.

== History ==
The Kennet and Avon Canal was built in three stages. The first was the canalisation of the River Kennet from Reading to Newbury, which was built between 1718 and 1723. Next to be constructed was the canalisation of the River Avon between Bath and Bristol, which was built between 1725 and 1727. After a long break, a canal between Newbury and Bath was authorised by the Kennet and Avon Canal Act 1794 (34 Geo. 3. c. 90). John Rennie was the engineer for this phase.

After the enabling act had been obtained, the committee appointed to manage the work decided that they would build a broad canal, suitable for boats 70 feet (21 m) long by 13.5 feet (4.1 m) wide, rather than a narrow canal. The section from Newbury to Hungerford opened in 1798, and this was extended to Great Bedwyn in 1799. Despite severe financial difficulties, the section from Foxhanger near Devizes to Bath was eventually completed in 1804, and work of the section from Devizes to Pewsey was underway in 1803, but no work had been done on the final section between Pewsey and Great Bedwyn. The Devizes to Pewsey section was opened in 1807, although the 29 locks of the Caen Hill Flight at Devizes had not been completed.

Had Rennie's plans been followed, most of the Crofton Locks would not have been built. He had proposed a tunnel 4,312 yards (3,943 m) long from Crofton to Wootton Rivers which would have been around 40 feet (12 m) lower than the present summit level. This was at a level where there was a water supply, and would have made a summit level that was 15 miles (24 km) long, acting as a large reservoir which would have terminated at Devizes. The canal company asked William Jessop for a second opinion, and he suggested building the canal at a higher level, which would not need a tunnel at all, but would need a pumping station to provide a water supply. Jessop estimated that this would save £41,000 in construction costs, and would be competed two years earlier. The short Bruce Tunnel at Savernake, 502 yards (459 m) long, was built after Lord Ailesbury objected to a cutting 50 feet (15 m) deep through his land, which would have been visible from his Tottenham Park pleasure grounds. The summit level is just 2 miles (3.2 km) long, before four locks return it to the level of Rennie's proposed summit level at Wootton Rivers. The tunnel was named in honour of Thomas Bruce, 2nd Earl of Ailesbury, and still contains chains on the walls, which were used by the crews of boats to pull their boats through, as the towpath goes over the top of the tunnel.

The Pewsey to Great Bedwyn section, including the nine locks of the Crofton Flight, was the last to be started, and opened with the locks of the Caen Hill Flight in 1810. From Great Bedwyn, nine locks raise the level of the canal by approximately 61 feet (18.6 m), as the level of the summit pound varies a little. The distance from Crofton Bottom Lock or Beech Grove Lock, number 63 to Crofton Top Lock, number 55, is 1.5 miles (2.4 km). To the west of the top lock is the summit of the canal at 452 ft (137 m) above sea level.

Near Crofton there were a number of springs, and these were used as a source of water for Crofton Pumping Station, in order to supply the summit level, for which there was no natural water supply. The building was designed by Rennie and built between 1802 and 1809. It housed a Boulton and Watt beam engine, with a wooden beam, which was operational by 1809. A second Boulton and Watt engine, fitted with parallel motion and a condenser, was supplied in 1812. However, the locks required more water than the springs could supply, and this was resolved in 1836 by damming the nearby River Dun to create an 8-acre (3.2 ha) reservoir known as Wilton Water, from which additional supplies could be drawn. The work was carried out by John Blackwell. The pumping station was extended in 1843, and the 1809 engine was replaced by a Sims combined cylinders engine, supplied in 1846 by Harvey & Co of Hayle, Cornwall. The manufacturers modified it in 1908, replacing the compound Sims cylinders with a Cornish cycle cylinder.

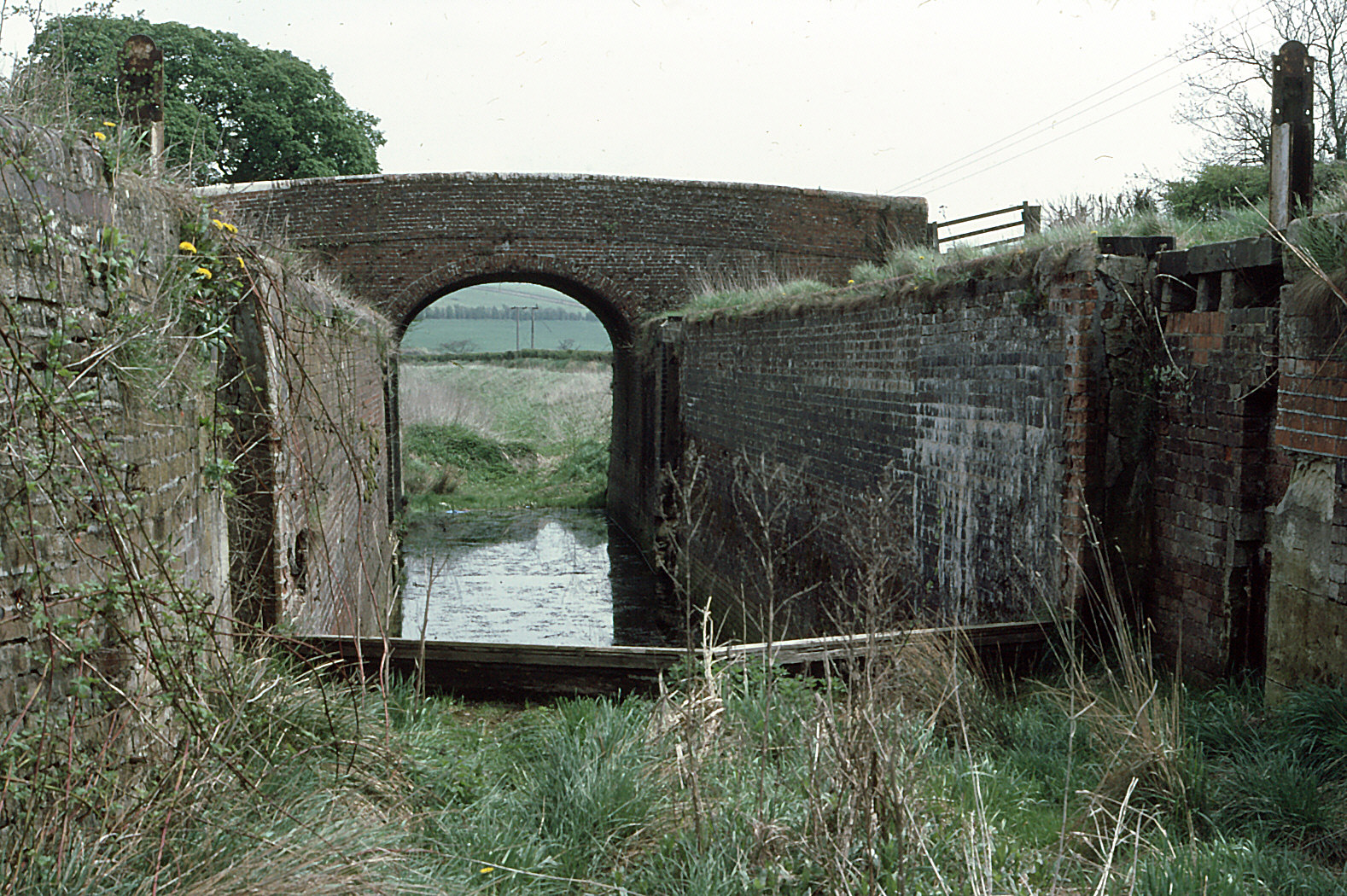
Sam Farmer Lock No.58 in 1979, prior to restoration

The canal and locks passed into the ownership of the Great Western Railway in 1851, but the canal was already in serious decline. Traffic and maintenance standards continued to decline, and there was little traffic on the central section, with most traffic either to the east of Newbury or to the west of Devizes. The locks were virtually unused from the 1920s, although a small number of barges used them until the 1930s. The last known transit of the locks was in 1951 by the narrowboat Queen, with the canal closing later that year. The Kennet and Avon Canal Trust was formed in 1961, and after ownership of the canal became the responsibility of the British Waterways Board in 1962, there were some hopes that it could be restored. Working parties by what would become the Waterway Recovery Group were held on the canal from 1965.

Four locks were reopened in July 1974, reopening the canal as far as Newbury, and there were hopes that the Crofton Locks would be back in operation by 1976, as part of the scheme to reach Devizes. The date was too optimistic, but the Crofton Locks were formally opened by the Vice Chairman of British Waterways on 6 October 1988, who used the opportunity to announce that there were only three locks and three bridges left to restore in Berkshire, and that the installation of new gates on locks of the Caen Hill Flight at Devizes would allow the canal reopening to be completed by 1990. The lock pounds leaked, and the flight was kept dry until repuddling of the pounds took place between March and May 1989, allowing limited use of the flight from 29 May. Restoration of the canal was completed by July 1990, and Queen Elizabeth II declared the whole canal open in August.

Lockage water is taken from Wilton Water to the summit at the western end of the locks by electric pumps and, on occasion, by the restored beam engines. An open feeder channel runs along the side of the valley to the north of the railway to reach the top lock. A £1.8 million project to upgrade the pumping system was carried out between 2020 and 2023. The first phase of the project involved replacing the pipes between the canal and the pumping station, and those from the pumping station to the feeder channel. This was completed in March 2020. The previous set of electric pumps had been installed in the 1980s, and were increasingly unreliable. In order to allow their replacement, some 6 miles (9.7 km) of the canal between Burnt Mill Lock at Great Bedwyn and Heathy Close Lock at Wootton Rivers, including the whole of the Crofton flight, was closed between November 2022 and April 2023, with parts of the flight drained. The project included new pumps, new pipework and new elecrical systems. Work was also carried out at Wilton Water, to improve flow to the pumping station, and to restore its heritage control gates. The towpath near to the pumping station remained shut until July 2023 after the main works were completed.

== Location ==
Although Crofton is in the civil parish of Great Bedwyn, Crofton Locks are actually situated in the parish of Grafton, as the parish boundary at this point is the West of England Main Line railway to the north of the canal.

== Route ==
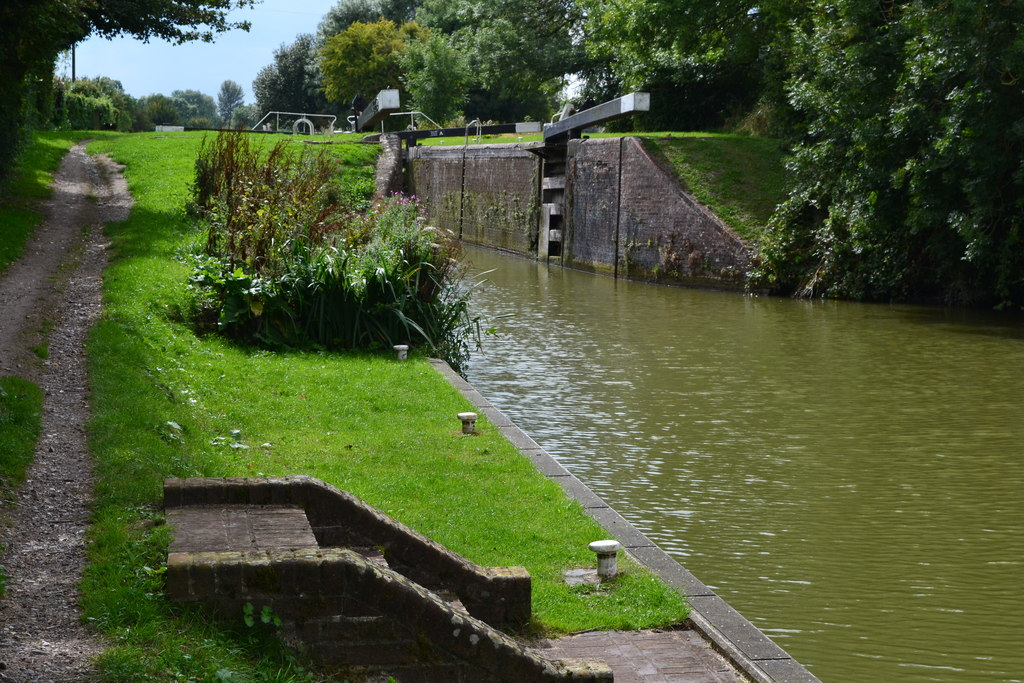
Lock No.62 in 2019

Just to the west of the top of the lock flight is Wolfhall Bridge, a brick-built accommodation bridge with an elliptical arch, solid parapets and stone coping stones above the parapets. It is built to Rennie's standard design, dating from the opening of the canal and is grade II listed. Nearby are the remains of embankments for the defunct Midland and South Western Junction Railway. Two bridges formerly crossed the canal, one to join the current West of England Main Line and the second which passed over the West of England Main Line to reach Savernake station. The canal widens significantly at this point, and water from the canal feeder from Cofton pumping station flows over a weir into the canal. The feeder passes under the railway and another small bridge to the north of the railway. The canal then enters Crofton Top Lock, numbered 55, which has an attached accommodation bridge at its downstream end. Wolfhall Fields Bridge is another standard Rennie design, although it was altered in the 20th century. The lock is of brick construction, with two sets of double gates. Those at the upper end have mechanical ground paddles, while those at the lower end have hydraulic paddles fitted to the gates.

Next comes the unnamed lock 56, Adopters Lock number 57 and Sam Farmer Lock number 58. Below the lock Freewarren Bridge carries a minor road over the canal when then squeezes between the railway and canal to reach the pumping station. Locks 59 and 60 are unnamed. One the north side of the railway is Crofton pumping station, a grade I listed structure dating from 1809. It was enlarged in 1843, and restored in 1971. From 1826, an extra pump supplied water to Tottenham House. The two beam engines can raise 1 ton of water per stroke, with the 1812 engine making 12 strokes per minute and the 1843 engine making nine. The pumped water flows for 4,900 feet (1,500 m) to reach the canal at Crofton Top Lock. There is a separate flue for the pumping station, built by the Great Western Railway in 1851 after they bought the canal. It is made of brick with iron bands around it, and is grade II* listed. A subway under the railway provides pedestrian access between the pumping station and lock 60.

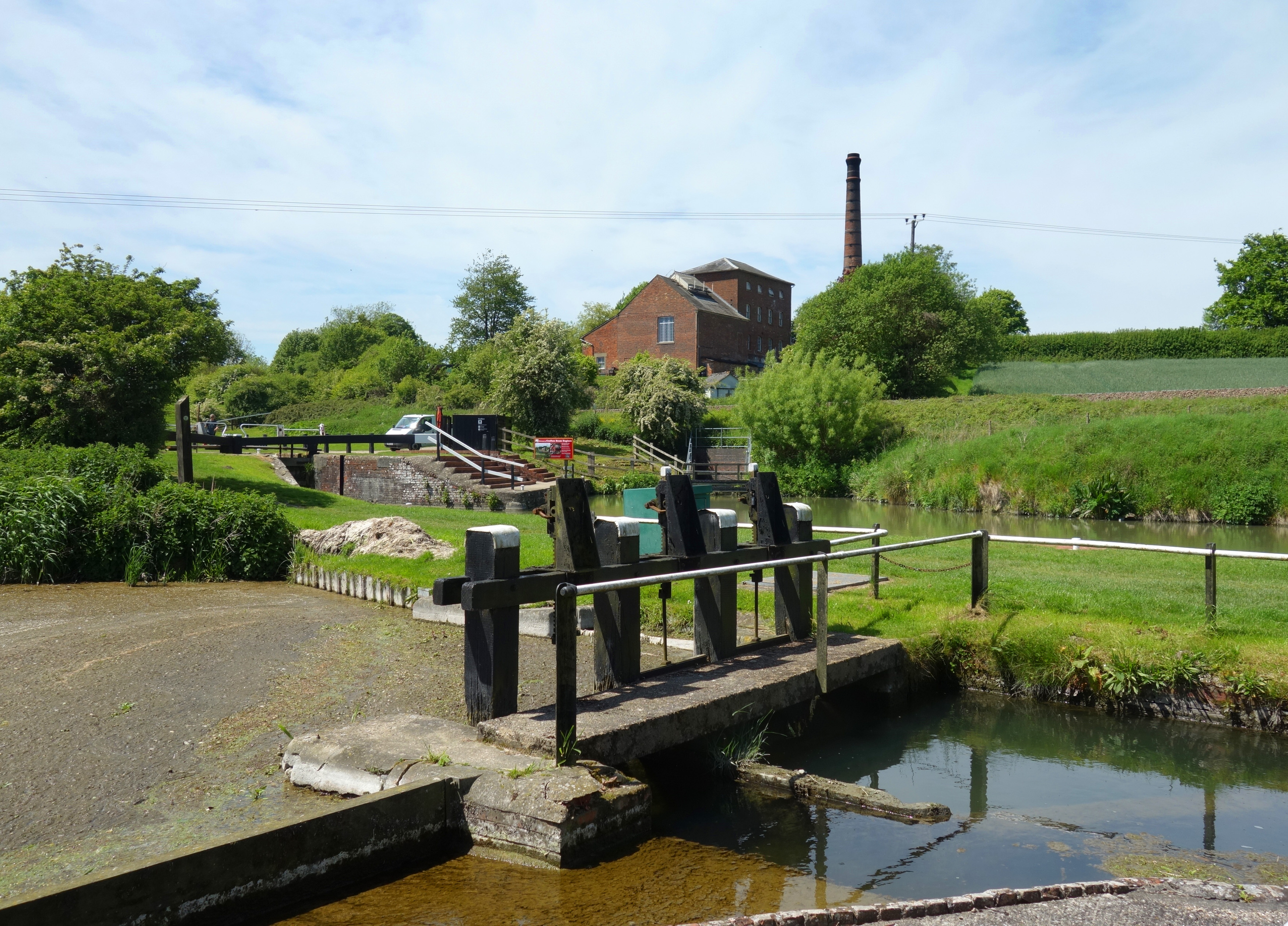
Wilton Water outfall sluices, with lock 60 and Crofton pumping station behind

To the south of lock 60 is Wilton Water, the reservoir that supplies the pumping station. A feeder tunnel passes under the canal downstream of the lock. The grade II listed sluices control the outflow of water at various levels. The three outlet sluices were restored some time before 1986, and supply water to the River Dun, but there is a feeder near lock 61 which supplies water to the pound below that lock. The sluices were restored again in 2022/23 as part of the upgrade to the pumping station. Lock 61 is attached to Crofton Crossing Bridge, and is constructed of brick with stone coping stones. Both are grade II listed. Lock 62 has a bypass weir and channel and is followed by New Bridge, which carries a footpath over the canal. The final lock of the flight is Beech Grove Lock number 63 with Beech Grove Bridge immediately below it. A bypass weir leaves the canal above the lock, and the bridge includes four concrete rings, added during World War II to prevent tanks from crossing it, if there were an invasion. On Ordnance Survey maps, this bridge is New Bridge, rather than the previous one. There is a towpath throughout the length of the flight on the southern bank of the canal, and a footpath that runs from the towpath along the eastern edge of Wilton Water to reach the hamlet of Wilton, part of the civil parish of Grafton.

== See also ==
- Locks on the Kennet and Avon Canal

Media related to Crofton Locks at Wikimedia Commons

Next lock upstream	Kennet and Avon Canal	Next lock downstream
Wootton Top Lock	Crofton Locks; Grid reference: SU254622	Bedwyn Church Lock
