= Kennet and Avon Canal Trust =

- Kennet and Avon Canal Trust logo
- Founded: 1962
- Type: Charity, waterway society
- Purpose: Kennet and Avon Canal
- Location: Couch Lane, Devizes, Wiltshire, SN10 1EB
- Coordinates: 51°21′18″N 1°59′40″W
- Services: Charitable services
- Website: katrust.org.uk
- Formerly called: Kennet and Avon Canal Association

The Kennet and Avon Canal Trust is an English registered charity and waterway society, concerned with the protection and maintenance of the Kennet and Avon Canal throughout Wiltshire and Berkshire.

== History ==
After the Kennet and Avon Canal passed into the ownership of the Great Western Railway in 1851, traffic and maintenance standards continued to decline, and there was almost no traffic on the central section by the 1920s, although there was still some traffic either to the east of Newbury or to the west of Devizes. The last known transit of the canal was in 1951 by the narrowboat Queen, and the canal closed later that year.

A Kennet and Avon Canal branch of the Inland Waterways Association was formed in Newbury when Robert Aickman addressed a meeting on 29 January 1949. The condition of the canal was continuing to decline and in 1951 the Kennet and Avon Canal branch decided that their aims of restoring the derelict canal would be better served by forming an independent body to drive forward restoration locally. The Kennet and Avon Canal Association was the result, and was supported by Charles Hadfield and Tom Rolt, both former founding members of the Inland Waterways Association. Hadfield spoke about the history of the canal at the first meeting of the association on 27 October 1951. In 1955 the British Transport Commission published their Board of Survey Report, which recommended that the Kennet and Avon should be abandoned. However, Gould of Newbury attempted to get an injunction to prevent the Commission from further damaging the canal, and the association held a protest meeting at Devizes on 6 July 1955. As a result, local support for retaining the canal increased.

In late 1955, the association organised a petition to Queen Elizabeth II, which over 22,000 people signed. The document was bound into two volumes, and travelled from Bristol to London by boat and canoe. They then organised a procession to the Ministry of Transport, where it was presented on 26 January 1956. There was considerable coverage of the events by radio, television, the press and film companies, and it made a significant political impact. Six days later, on 1 February, the Ministry of Transport announced that the Bowes Committee would review the future of the inland waterways. Meanwhile the British Transport Commission bill to abandon the canal was being considered by Parliament, and the House of Commons decided to delete that clause from the bill after lengthy debate. The British Transport Commission then agreed that they would not allow the canal to deteriorate any further until a decision on its future was reached. The association held several rallies, which gained more public support for the canal's retention.

=== Restoration of the canal ===
Lionel Munk of the Inland Waterways Association suggested that the association should produce a document detailing the costs of restoration, which could be presented to the Inland Waterways Redevelopment Advisory Committee, set up in April 1959 following the publication of the Bowes Report. Volunteers from the association started work on repairing locks at the eastern end of the canal, so that a trip boat could be operated. The British Transport Commission Act 1960 (8 & 9 Eliz. 2. c. xlvii) did not make any concessions for the restoration of the canal, and the association continued their campaign to ensure it was not lost. Little physical progress had been made, but much public support had been obtained, and this influenced politicians.

Details of the restoration costs were published in The Times on 18 February 1961; the document had been produced by Munk and Glaister from the association. It began by suggesting that the benefits of a restored waterway would far outweigh the actual cost of restoring it. In June 1961 Munk suggested that the association should become a charitable trust, which would be better suited to carry the restoration forwards. Consequently, the organisation reformed to become the Kennet and Avon Canal Trust in 1962.

A breakthrough occurred in January 1964, when the Ministry of Transport published The Future of the Waterway, a report by the British Waterways Board (which had succeeded the Transport Commission in 1962). The report contained the first official recognition that the canals had an amenity value, rather than just being part of the national transport system. More importantly for the trust, the Kennet and Avon was specifically mentioned, as needing "sympathetic, careful and urgent consideration" and the document stated that the Board would start discussions with the trust and other interested parties as to how restoration could be achieved. Another development was the creation of a Working Party Group in 1965, which later became the Waterway Recovery Group, consisting of volunteers who would undertake specific restoration tasks. At the invitation of the trust, early projects included work on the Kennet and Avon. A group of 97 "navvies" worked on clearing a stretch of the canal at Reading in October 1967.

There was some concern within the waterways restoration movement in 1971 when the government announced that Harrington was to be replaced as chairman of the Inland Waterways Amenity Advisory Council, which was then considering the future of waterways which had no commercial future and were classed as "Remainder" waterways. Some indication of the standing of the Trust was given when its chairman, Hugh Stockwell, was elected to serve on the Advisory Council as well. The trust's vision took another step forward on 13 July 1974 when Lord Sandford reopened Hungerford Lock, one of four locks to the west of Kintbury which had been restored. The trust was confident that the canal would be open from Newbury to Devizes by 1976, but the timescale was unrealistic.

Another breakthrough occurred in 1976. The Manpower Services Commission's Job Creation Programme provided young people with work experience, and several canals had benefitted from the scheme. Unlike the Kennet and Avon, all had been canals which had not been nationalised in 1948. In October 1976, the first scheme to benefit a canal managed by British Waterways was announced. The canal between Limpley Stoke and Avoncliff was dry, and the commission offered a grant of £238,000 so that young people could be employed to rebuild this section. Materials for the work were paid for by the trust, at a cost of £75,000, and British Waterways contributed £28,000 to pay for plant and fuel to allow the work to take place. Other work which came to fruition in 1976 included Tyle Mill and Towney locks at the eastern end of the canal, which were opened on 23 May, and the lock flight at Widcombe, Bath, in the west, which opened on 12 June. The longer-term restoration of Claverton Pumping Station was completed in 1978, ensuring that there was a water supply to the restored Limpley Stoke section of the canal.

Water supply to the canal had always been meagre, and in 1986 back pumps were installed at Bradford-on-Avon. It was anticipated that there would again be water shortages when the canal was fully reopened, and a solution involved further pumps at Semington, Seend, Devizes and Wootton Rivers. The trust committed itself to raising the funds needed to buy and install the equipment. Reopening to Devizes came a step closer on 6 October 1988 when the vice-chairman of British Waterways formally opened Crofton Locks, and announced that only three locks and three bridges, together with the re-gating of some of the Caen Hill Locks, remained to be done before the canal would be fully operational.

After a campaign raising over £2 million, the canal was reopened by Queen Elizabeth II on 8 August 1990. Problems with water supply meant that the Trust's trip boat Rose of Hungerford had been moved to Devizes by road. The Queen arrived at Devizes wharf, where she was greeted by the trust's president, Earl Jellicoe and Lady Jellicoe, the chairman, Admiral Sir William O'Brien and Lady O'Brien, British Waterways' chairman David Ingman and their chief executive Brian Dice. In the canal centre, she met other members of the trust and visited the museum, before travelling to Caen Hill depot, where she stepped onto the Rose of Hungerford. The boat descended through lock 44, and when it exited the lock, broke a tape to open the canal before it entered lock 43. The Queen disembarked, and unveiled a plaque officially naming the lock Queen Elizabeth II Lock, before departing.

=== Consolidation ===
For many in the waterways restoration movement and the trust, the official opening appeared to mark the end of nearly 50 years of effort which had culminated in success. In reality, much of the canal was still in a poor state of repair, with sections near Bath known to be unstable; the water supply was still inadequate, and the canal was in a similar state as it had been in the 1930s, when any repairs had been carried out as economically as possible. Additionally, the canal was still listed as a "remainder waterway" under the terms of the Transport Act 1968, which meant that British Waterways were severely restricted as to what they could spend on it if significant repairs became necessary.

Several of the trustees resigned shortly after the official opening, including Admiral O'Brien, who had steered the trust through the difficult process of getting the canal reopened. Shortly afterwards, the treasurer resigned. He had consolidated a large number of bank accounts kept by disparate groups within the trust, and introduced central management of the trust's funds. The wisdom of such action was shown when the trust became embroiled in a dispute over funds for the Crofton pumping station. The Crofton Society, which managed the station, had dismantled the last remaining Great Western Railway Lancashire boiler, despite English Heritage having promised a grant to repair the roof which protected the engine. When knowledge of the dismantling became known, English Heritage withdrew the grant and blacklisted the trust, leaving them to find the funds to complete the part-finished roof repairs. Acrimonious meetings between the society and the trust took place, which resulted in the trust disbanding the society, and forming a new group to manage the station, who were prepared to work within the constitution of the trust.

Denys Hutchings, who had been involved with the canal for 57 years, and been a member of the council for over 40 years, was the next to resign, He died a few months later, and the canal company clock from Honeystreet was repaired and erected in the pumping station to celebrate his contribution to the work of the trust. The clock was unveiled by his wife on Easter Sunday 1993. As the new trustees set about creating a new management structure and defining the future aims of the trust now that the canal was open, a dry summer resulted in sections of the canal emptying. Leakage at Crofton Locks and Caen Hill Locks resulted in them being unusable, and there were issues with leakage and slippage in the Bath Valley. The trustees decided that a separate trading company should be set up, managed by a separate board of directors, to distance the charitable aims of the trust from its business interests. The Department of the Environment agreed to continue paying a grant of £14,500 to help with the administration costs of the trust. The Kennet and Avon Canal Trust (Enterprise) Ltd was established in July 1992, and given a loan of £45,000 by the trust. The company also inherited the trip boats, valued at £30,000.

As the new arrangements bedded in, the trust looked at how it could improve the canal. Since the opening, the Caen Hill Locks had been closed for more days than they had been open, and this had generated some bad publicity. As no new water supplies were available, they decided that a back pumping scheme should be implemented. British Waterways could not legally fund such a scheme, and the trust agreed that they would find the £1 million cost, aided by grants from local authorities. British Waterways had negotiated a 5-year maintenance grant from several local authorities, which was due to come to an end in 1995. They agreed to extend the arrangement for a further two years. The trust paid for the pumphouse and pumps at Lower Foxhangers, and Kennet District Council offered the services of their engineering department to design and supervise the installation. Two pumps would raise 300,000 imperial gallons (1,400 m^{3}) of water an hour through a pipeline 2.25 miles (3.62 km) long, lifting water 235 feet (72 m) to the top of the flight. This was equivalent to a lock-full of water every 11 minutes, and meant that the locks would be available for use every day. The project cost £1.1 million, and was supported by eight local authorities – Avon, the county councils of Berkshire and Wiltshire, the district councils of Kennet, Newbury, Wansdyke and West Wiltshire, and the city council of Bath.

With his vision for the Caen Hill Locks completed and a new sense of pioneering spirit instilled in the membership, the chairman of the trust Brian Stark resigned, and David Lamb took over. Two further back pumping schemes were required, at Bath and Wootton Rivers, but the economic situation changed with the introduction of the Heritage Lottery Fund. Seven local authorities had agreed to finance the maintenance of the canal for a five year period from 1985, jointly contributing £500,000 per year. Part way through this period, they realised that some of the money was being spent on capital works, and decided to split the money between maintenance and restoration. They also wanted more understanding of how the money was spent, becoming interested in restoration, and forging closer links with the trust, who had previously been alone in funding restoration. This led to the formation of a steering committee, which became known as the Kennet and Avon Partnership.

British Waterways and the trust made a joint submission to the fund for grants to complete the restoration of the canal. The partnership were originally the patrons for the submission, but as the newly-formed Heritage Lottery Fund waded through the mass of applications for funding, they decided that they would only give money to the owners of assets, and so dealt with British Waterways, as owners of the canal, and the Kennet and Avon Canal Trust, as owners of Crofton Pumping Station. The bid was for £21,568,000, with the promise of £3,202,000 in match funding, partly consisting of materials and labour. The application identified 49 major contracts, and 885 minor tasks which needed to be funded. A document over 2 inches (51 mm) thick was submitted on 3 October 1995, and was used by the Heritage Lottery Fund as a template for subsequent bids. The grant was announced on 31 October 1996. During the process, the local authorities had reached agreement on a more equitable distribution of who supplied the funds, and how their contributions would taper off as the canal became self-supporting. The match funding had risen to £7,421,000, as there was no allowance for inflation over the 6 years of the project's timescale. Legal delays meant that it would take until late 1997 for funds to begin flowing.

One requirement of the Heritage Lottery Fund was that at the end of the project, British Waterways would update the status of the waterway to "cruiseway." British Waterways were unable to agree to this, as the "remainder" designation had been defined by an act of Parliament, and so another act would be required to undo it. An agreement was eventually reached that they would "use their best endeavours" to seek reclassification of the canal.

In 2013, the trust was presented with the Queen's Award for Voluntary Service.

== Operations ==
The trust operates the Kennet and Avon Canal Museum in a canalside building at Devizes Wharf. The building was constructed around 1810, and volunteers from the trust restored it in the late 1970s. By the 2020s it was in need of significant investment, but the trust was unable to attract outside funding because of the leasing arrangements. This was resolved in early 2026, when Wiltshire Council granted a 125-year lease at a peppercorn rent. The trust could then apply for grants as a secure long-term occupier.
