= East Grafton =

East Grafton may refer to:

- East Grafton, New Hampshire, in the United States
- East Grafton, Wiltshire, in England

== See also ==
- Grafton, New York, which contains the hamlet of East Grafton
- Knights Landing, California, formerly Baltimore and East Grafton
