= Burnt Mill Lock =

Canal lock in Wiltshire, England

Coordinates: 51.38245°N 1.59474°W

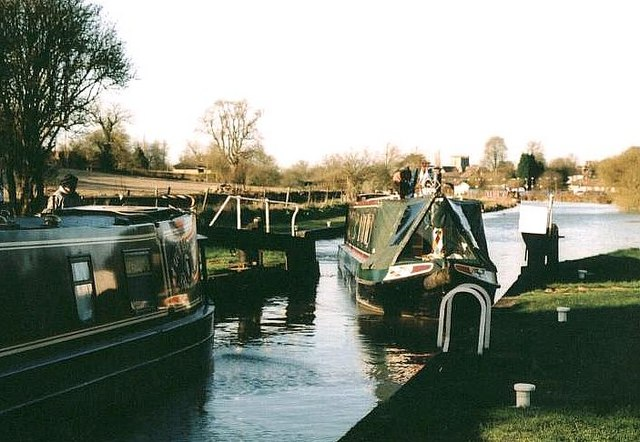
Burnt Mill Lock

Burnt Mill Lock is on the Kennet and Avon Canal, at Great Bedwyn, Wiltshire, England.

The lock has a rise/fall of 7 ft 9 in (2.36 m).

== See also ==
- Locks on the Kennet and Avon Canal

Next lock upstream	Kennet and Avon Canal	Next lock downstream
Bedwyn Church Lock	Burnt Mill Lock; Grid reference: SU283649	Potter's Lock
