= Grafton, Wiltshire =

Civil parish in Wiltshire, England

Coordinates: 51.335°N 1.625°W

Grafton
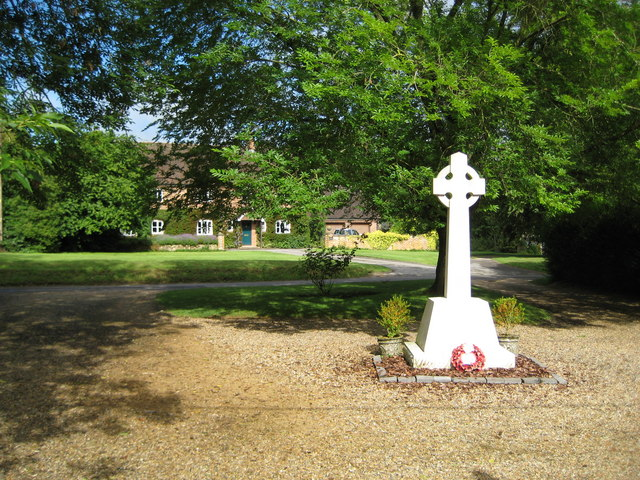
- War Memorial, East Grafton

- Location within Wiltshire
- Population: 686 (in 2011)
- OS grid reference: SU257605
- Civil parish: Grafton
- Unitary authority: Wiltshire
- Ceremonial county: Wiltshire
- Region: South West
- Country: England
- Sovereign state: United Kingdom
- Post town: Marlborough
- Postcode district: SN8
- Dialling code: 01672
- Police: Wiltshire
- Fire: Dorset and Wiltshire
- Ambulance: South Western
- UK Parliament: East Wiltshire
- Website: Parish Council

Grafton is a civil parish in Wiltshire, England, in the Vale of Pewsey about 7 miles (11 km) southeast of Marlborough. Its main settlement is the village of East Grafton, on the A338 Burbage - Hungerford road; the parish includes the village of Wilton (not to be confused with the town of Wilton near Salisbury) and the hamlets of West Grafton, Marten and Wexcombe.

The parish is within the North Wessex Downs Area of Outstanding Natural Beauty, while Marten lies under the northwest edge of the Hampshire Downs.

== History ==
Prehistoric earthworks in the parish include the long barrow known as Tow Barrow, on Wexcombe Down, south of Wexcombe. Neolithic pottery was found in 1914 when the site was partially excavated by Crawford and Hooton.

Marten is one of several possible sites for the murder of Cynewulf of Wessex in 786, and one of several suggested sites for the Battle of Marton in 871, in which Æthelred of Wessex suffered a defeat by the Viking army.

A Roman road between Cirencester and Winchester passes Wilton and Marten. The area was part of the ancient parish of Great Bedwyn, formed from a large estate called Bedwyn which was recorded in 968. The 1086 Domesday Book recorded 16 households at (East) Grafton and six at Marten.

Earthworks at Marten, including evidence of a moat, are listed as a deserted medieval village. The manor farmhouses at West Grafton and Wilton are from the 17th century; Wexcombe Manor is from the 18th.

The southern half of Great Bedwyn parish (south of the railway) became a separate ecclesiastical district in 1844, when the church was built at East Grafton; the civil parish of Grafton was created in 1895. Having no large settlements, the population of the parish changed little in the 20th century. The manor of Wolfhall was transferred to Burbage parish in 1988.

The parish war memorial stands at the approach to the church. A Celtic cross in granite on a tapering four-sided plinth, it honours 19 casualties of the first war and six of the second.

== Canal and railways ==
The Kennet and Avon Canal, opened in 1809, passes north of Wilton. Wilton Water was created by damming a spring-fed valley as a reservoir for the summit pound of the canal. Seven of the nine Crofton Locks are within the parish.

In 1862 the Great Western Railway built the Berks and Hants Extension Railway from Hungerford to Pewsey and Devizes, closely following the route of the canal; in Grafton parish the line is immediately north of the canal. The local stations were Savernake Low Level and Bedwyn. The line is still in use as part of the Reading to Taunton line, and Bedwyn station is still open.

The Swindon, Marlborough and Andover Railway was built northwards from Andover in 1882, terminating at Grafton and Burbage station which was on the south side of the main road at West Grafton; the next year the line was completed to Marlborough and Swindon. In 1905, owing to traffic for army camps on Salisbury Plain, the two lines were linked by the Grafton Curve and a bridge over the canal. This allowed trains to run between Bedwyn station and Grafton & Burbage. The line and station were closed in 1961.

== Religious sites ==
=== Anglican ===
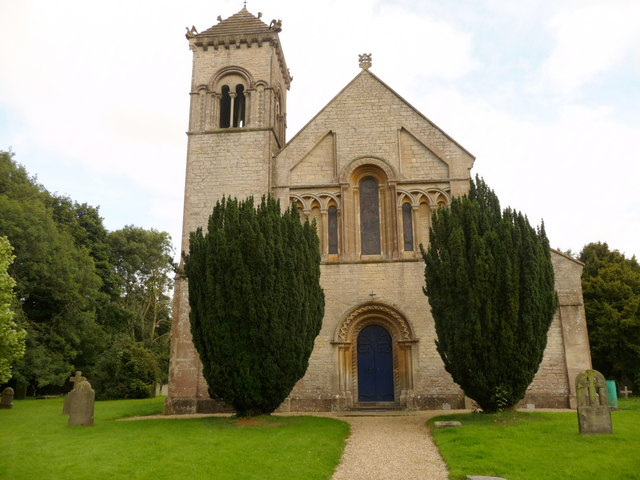
St Nicholas' Church

At first the parish church was at Great Bedwyn. East Grafton, Marten and Wilton each had a chapel of ease in the 14th and 15th centuries, and possibly earlier. Wexcombe had a chapel of ease by 1879, where services were conducted by the vicar of Tidcombe from 1899; it closed in the 1920s. In Tidcombe churchyard are 19th-century tombs of members of the Hawkins family of Wexcombe.

The Church of England parish church of St Nicholas at East Grafton was built in 1842–44, to designs by Benjamin Ferrey , on land near the south end of the village green which was given by the Marquess of Ailesbury. The style is called "thoroughly Norman" by Pevsner; in limestone ashlar and square rubble, it has a matching lychgate. The tall five-bay nave has aisles and a clerestory, and the short apsed chancel is described in Orbach's revision of the Pevsner volume as "boldly modelled with much shafting, and painted decoration". The decorative scheme was by Thomas Willement, who also made the west window. The north-west tower has an open bell-stage and a pyramidal roof with prominent gargoyles.

The church was designated as Grade II* listed in 1986. The listing states that "the whole is a triumph of a normally difficult revival style, and significant in its evolution" and notes that the design is said to be based on the 12th-century Église Saint-Pierre, Thaon, Normandy. There are similarities to the church of St Mary and St Nicholas at Wilton, also completed in 1844.

The stone font is copied from Welford church, Berkshire. There is a ring of five tubular bells, hung in 1903.

A chapelry district was assigned to the new church in the year of its consecration, 1844, made from the southern part of Great Bedwyn parish. The district boundary was drawn along the canal in the north-west and through Wilton in the north-east, thus including West Grafton, Marten and Wexcombe. Today the parish is within the area of the Savernake Team, a group of twelve parishes centred on Great Bedwyn.

=== Others ===
A Wesleyan Methodist chapel was built at Wilton in 1811, extended with a schoolroom in 1843 and improved in the 1860s. It closed in 1994 and is in residential use.

Primitive Methodist chapels were built at West Grafton by 1874 and at Wexcombe in the 1880s. By the 1960s, both were in residential use.

== Local government ==
The civil parish elects a parish council. It is in the area of Wiltshire Council unitary authority, which performs all significant local government functions.

== Amenities and attractions ==
East Grafton has village hall, the Coronation Hall, built in 1937 and renovated in 2009.

There is no school in the parish. A National School was opened at East Grafton in 1846 and improved in the 20th century; it closed in 2011 owing to falling pupil numbers.

Julian Orbach describes Wilton as "a pretty hamlet of thatched houses in timber frame and brick". It has a pub, The Swan. On high ground above Wilton is a working 19th-century flour mill, Wilton Windmill.

Crofton Pumping Station, which supplies the Kennet and Avon Canal and has a 200-year-old beam engine, is just beyond the northern boundary of the parish. Its reservoir, Wilton Water, is a nature reserve.
