= Little Bedwyn Lock =

Lock in Wiltshire, England

Coordinates: 51.39140°N 1.58460°W

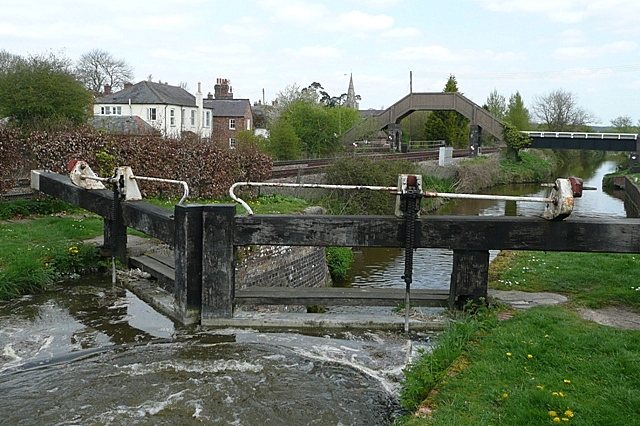
Little Bedwyn Lock

Little Bedwyn Lock is a lock on the Kennet and Avon Canal, at Little Bedwyn, Wiltshire, England.

The canal is administered by the Canal & River Trust. The lock has a rise/fall of 6 ft 7 in (2.01 m).

== See also ==
- Locks on the Kennet and Avon Canal

Next lock upstream	Kennet and Avon Canal	Next lock downstream
Potter's Lock	Little Bedwyn Lock; Grid reference: SU290659	Oakhill Down Lock
