= Freeman's Marsh =

Site of Special Scientific Interest in Berkshire, United Kingdom

- Site of Special Scientific Interest
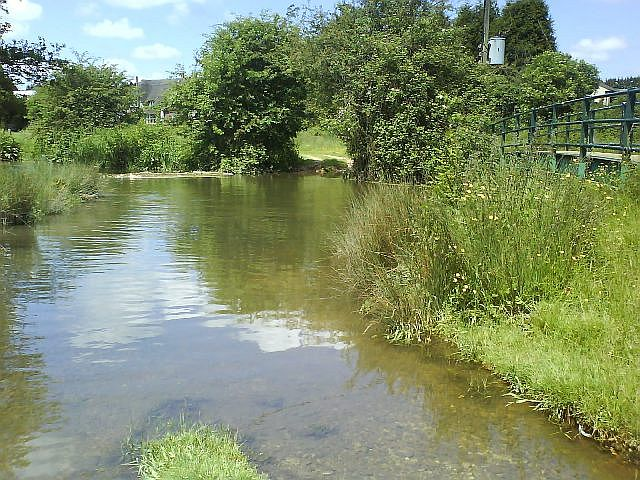

- Location within Berkshire
- Location of Freeman's Marsh.
- Area of search: Berkshire
- Grid reference: SU 329 686
- Coordinates: 51.415°N 1.532°W
- Interest: Biological
- Area: 25.1 hectares (62 acres)
- Notification date: 1986
- Location map: Magic Map

Freeman's Marsh is a 25.1-hectare (62-acre) biological Site of Special Scientific Interest on the northern outskirts of Hungerford in Berkshire, England. It is in the North Wessex Downs, which is an Area of Outstanding Natural Beauty. The site is owned by the Town and Manor of Hungerford.

Freeman's Marsh is in the flood plain of the River Dun, which goes through the site. It has unimproved meadows, which have long been traditionally managed by grazing, marsh, reedbeds and scattered woodland. Many species of birds nest on the river bank and in the marshy meadows, including snipe, little grebes and mute swans, while sedge warblers, reed warblers and reed buntings nest in tall fen and reed.

The site is crossed by public footpaths.
