= Wiltshire Historic Buildings Trust =

Preservation charity in Wiltshire, England

The Wiltshire Historic Buildings Trust (founded in 1967, sometimes abbreviated WHBT) is a charitable organisation which works to preserve the architectural heritage of Wiltshire, in the West of England.

== History ==
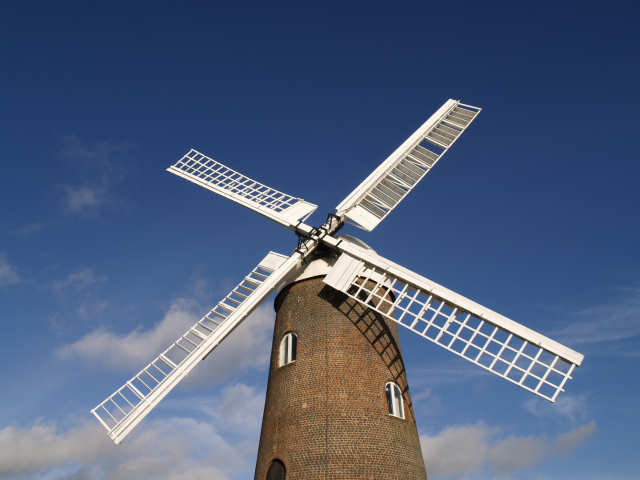
Wilton Windmill in 2008

The Trust was formed in 1967, its purpose being "to preserve property and buildings of architectural and historical interest in the county for the benefit of the nation". It is both a registered charity and a company limited by guarantee.

The money employed by the Trust originated in a single grant made at the time of its foundation by Wiltshire County Council, funding which has been described by the Trust's President Lord Lansdowne as "a revolving capital sum".

Since 1967, the Trust has been instrumental in a number of projects for the restoration and conversion of historic buildings large and small. At the end of a project, the restored building is sold, so that the Trust can recover the money laid out and look for a new project.

The restoration projects of the charity have included the following buildings: Barton Farm, Bradford on Avon (sold 1975); Number 23, South Wraxall (sold 1982); Wilton Windmill, near Marlborough (completed 1976); Number 3, High Street, Marlborough; Numbers 7, 9, 11, 13, 15, 21, 23 and 25, Church Street, Calne (1987–1992); The Well House, Derry Hill (2002–2003); The Ostler's House, at the Hare and Hounds public house, Pickwick (2003–2004); The Apple Store, Rowdeford School (2006); and The Granary, Manor Farm, Yatesbury (2006–2007).

Given its planned nature as a revolving fund, the articles of association of the Trust prevent it from making grants to private owners of historic buildings, but it has sometimes made contributions to special projects around Wiltshire promoted by others. A loan was made to the Merchant's House Trust in Marlborough to enable it to buy the burgage plot associated with the Merchant's House. Grants have included one to the Warminster Buildings Preservation Trust for a town centre project, another to the Friends of Lydiard Park to help with the restoration of an ice house in the grounds of that country house (a project completed in 2007), and a contribution to the Salisbury Cathedral Appeal.

The Trust is a member of the Association of Preservation Trusts.

=== Devizes Assize Courts ===
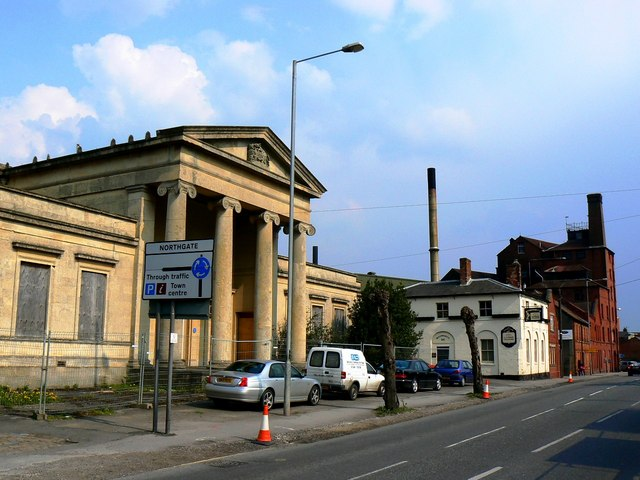
Former Assize Court, Devizes, in 2007

The Trust assisted Kennet District Council with a study into Devizes Assize Court in 2006–2007, and in 2018 supported the establishment of Devizes Assize Court Trust, a charity which bought the building and aims to restore it to provide a new home for Wiltshire Museum.

== People ==
Subscribers to the Memorandum and Articles of Association

- The Countess of Radnor
- John Morrison, 1st Baron Margadale
- Major S.V. Christie-Miller
- Sir Geoffrey Tritton, Baronet
- Mr R. P. Harries
- Mr R. L. W. Moon

Presidents

- 1967–1975: John Morrison, 1st Baron Margadale
- 1975–1994: The Countess of Radnor
- 1994–2022: Charles Petty-Fitzmaurice, 9th Marquess of Lansdowne (as Earl of Shelburne, 1994–1997)
- 2022– The Hon. Peter Pleydell-Bouverie

Chairmen

- 1967–1976: Sir Geoffrey Tritton, Bt.
- 1976–1980: Mrs B. G. Sykes
- 1980–1986: Dr T. K. Maurice
- 1986–2016: Mr G. F. McDonic
- 2017– : Mr John Barnard Bush

Governors

The trustees are known as 'governors'. Four are appointed by the Wiltshire Council unitary authority, and one by the Borough of Swindon; others are appointed by the existing governors of the Trust.

== See also ==
- Society for the Protection of Ancient Buildings
- Somerset Buildings Preservation Trust
