= Upper Eddington =

Hamlet in Berkshire, England

Coordinates: 51.423365°N 1.511616°W

- Location within Berkshire
- OS grid reference: SU340695
- Metropolitan borough: West Berkshire
- Metropolitan county: Berkshire
- Region: South East
- Country: England
- Sovereign state: United Kingdom
- Post town: HUNGERFORD
- Postcode district: RG17
- Dialling code: 01488
- Police: Thames Valley
- Fire: Royal Berkshire
- Ambulance: South Central
- UK Parliament: Newbury

Upper Eddington is a hamlet in Berkshire, England, and part of the civil parish of Hungerford.

The settlement lies near to the A4 road, and is located approximately 1/4 mile (0.40 km) north of Hungerford.
