= Bedwyn Church Lock =

Canal lock in Wiltshire, England

Coordinates: 51.3756°N 1.6017°W

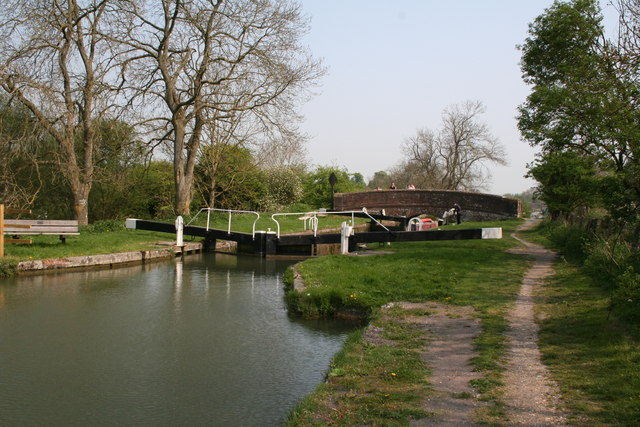
Bedwyn Church Lock

Bedwyn Church Lock is on the Kennet and Avon Canal at Great Bedwyn, Wiltshire, England.

The lock has a rise/fall of 7 ft 11 in (2.41 m). It is a Grade II listed structure.

== See also ==
- List of locks on the Kennet and Avon Canal

Next lock upstream	Kennet and Avon Canal	Next lock downstream
Crofton Locks	Bedwyn Church Lock; Grid reference: SU278641	Burnt Mill Lock
