= Wilton Water =

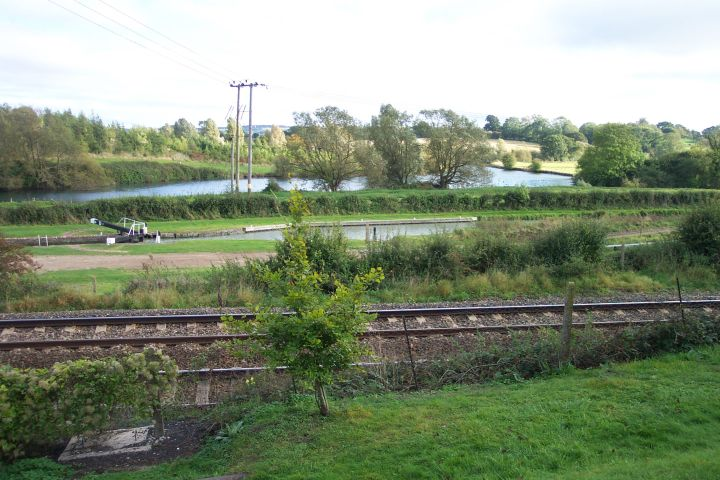
- Viewed from Crofton Pumping Station, canal and railway in foreground

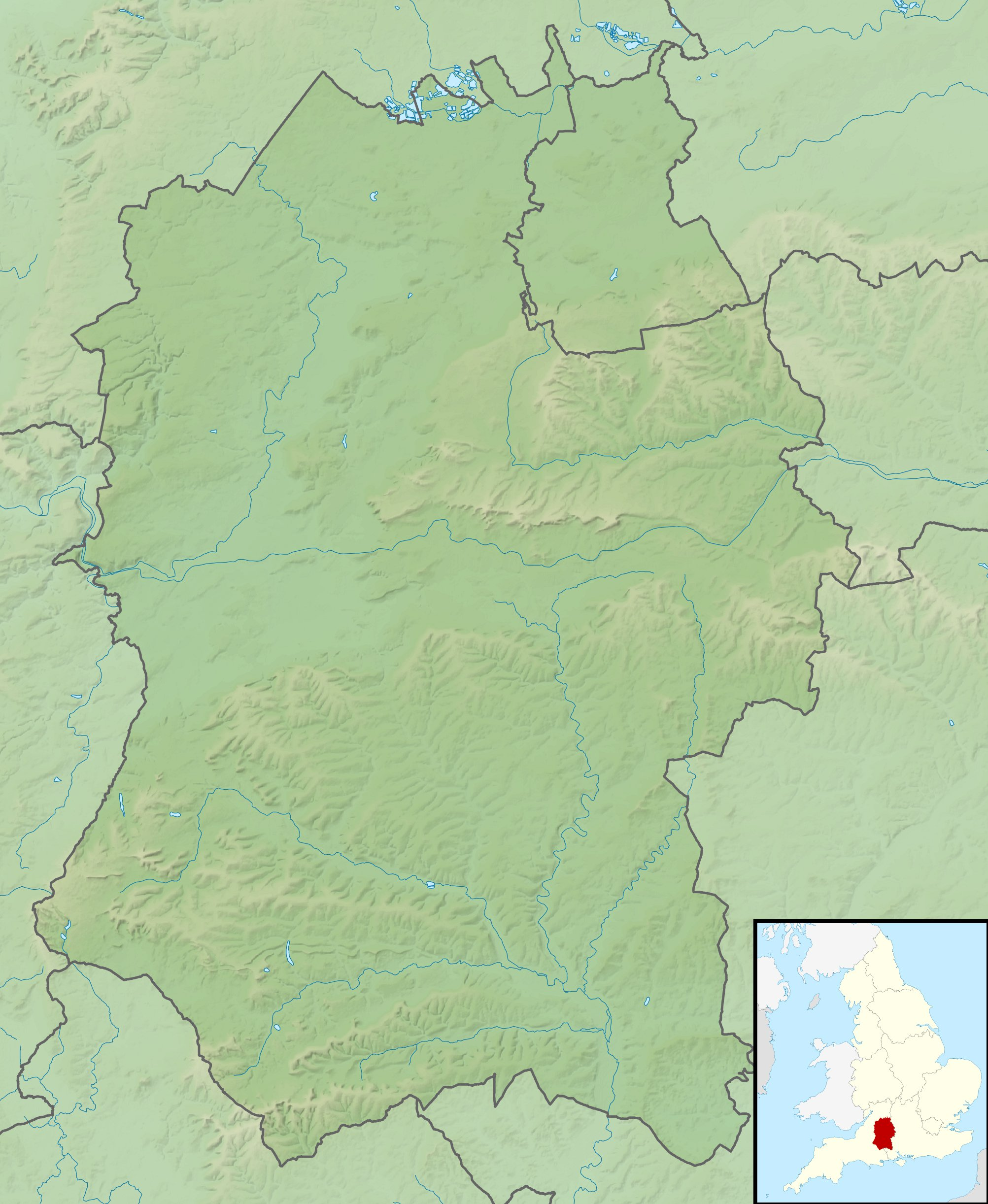
- Location within Wiltshire
- Location: Wiltshire
- Coordinates: 51.357°N 1.625°W
- Type: reservoir
- Basin countries: United Kingdom

Wilton Water (or Wide Waters) is a small reservoir, southwest of the village of Great Bedwyn in the English county of Wiltshire, which supplies the summit pound of the Kennet and Avon Canal with water. The reservoir lies in the parish of Grafton and collects rainfall from the eastern end of the Vale of Pewsey and the surrounding hills.

It was created by John Blackwell in 1836, by damming a narrow branching valley, and is fed by natural springs. In addition to supplying water for the canal, which is pumped by Crofton Pumping Station, it provides a haven for wildlife. It has been stocked with rainbow trout.

When the canal was built, there were no reliable water sources available to fill the summit by normal gravitational means. However, a set of usable springs were found adjacent to the canal route about one mile (2 km) east of the summit pound, and about 40 feet (12 m) below it. Arrangements were made for these springs to feed the pound below lock 60 at Crofton Locks. Some years later, the reservoir was created to enhance the supply to this pound.

The reservoir outfall and sluices are designated as Grade II listed structures.

== See also ==
- Canals of the United Kingdom
- History of the British canal system
