= Eddington, Berkshire =

Coordinates: 51°25′10″N 1°30′28″W

Eddington
- Village
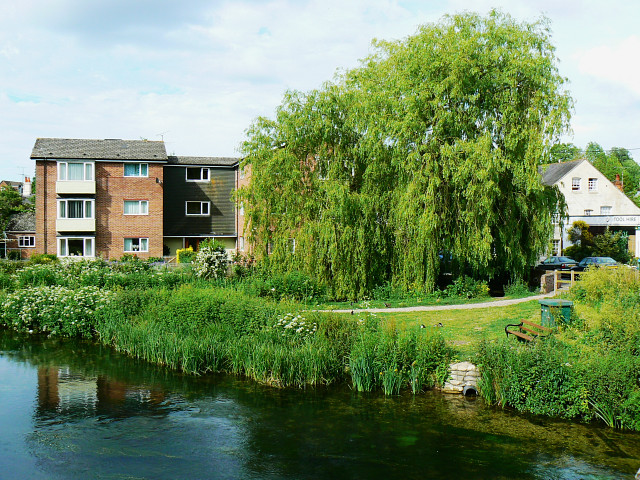
- Eddington overlooking the River Kennet

- Location within Berkshire
- OS grid reference: SU3436569125
- Civil parish: Hungerford
- Unitary authority: West Berkshire
- Ceremonial county: Berkshire
- Region: South East
- Country: England
- Sovereign state: United Kingdom
- Post town: HUNGERFORD
- Postcode district: RG17
- Dialling code: 01488
- Police: Thames Valley
- Fire: Royal Berkshire
- Ambulance: South Central
- UK Parliament: Newbury

Eddington is a village in the civil parish of Hungerford in the West Berkshire district of Berkshire, England. It lies approximately 0.7 miles (1.1 km) north-east from Hungerford, its nearest town and is divided from it by the River Kennet. The Eddington estate is owned by businessman Peter Michael and is located north of Eddington village.

== History ==
Eddington Mill is a late 18th century watermill on the Kennet which still has the machinery largely intact. It is a Grade II listed building.

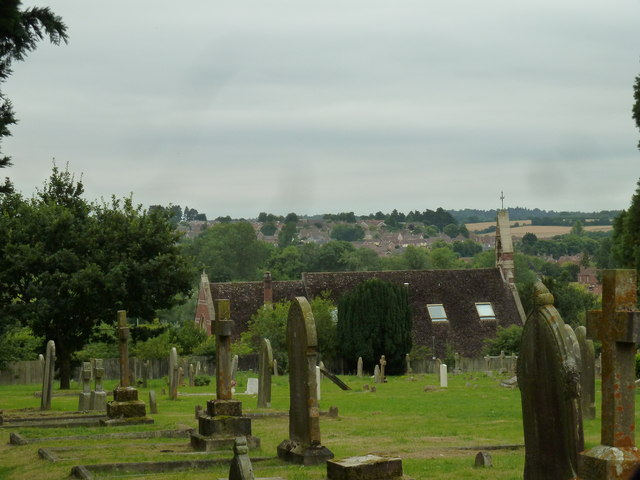
St Saviour's cemetery

St Saviour's church was built in 1868 and designed by Arthur Blomfield in the Gothic Revival style. The church closed in the mid-1950s. In 1977 it was sold and converted into a private house.

In 1876, two policemen were shot by poachers in Eddington. Their memorial crosses still stand where they fell.

The village wheelwright's shop, Messrs R. Middleton & Sons, closed in 1951. Some of the woodworking tools from the shop including axes, chisels, planes, lathe tools and gouges, were purchased at an auction on 6 April 1951, and are now in the Museum of English Rural Life.
