= Crofton Pumping Station =

Grade I listed pumping station in Great Bedwyn, United Kingdom

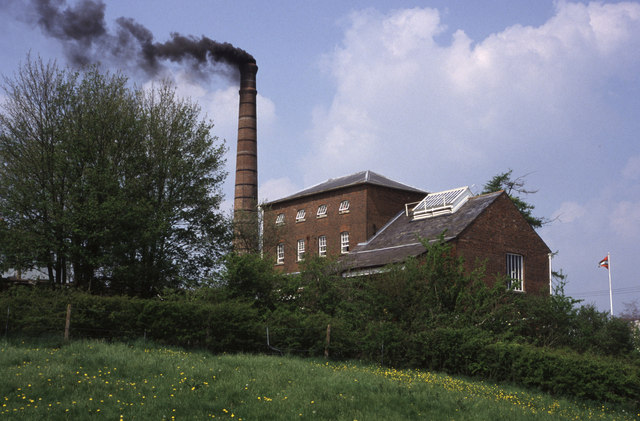
- The pumping station on a running day in 1999

- Location within Wiltshire
- 51°21′30″N 1°37′30″W
- Type: Pumping station
- Location: Crofton, Great Bedwyn, Wiltshire, England
- OS grid reference: SU 2615 6227

History
- Built: 1807–1809

Site notes
- Owner: Kennet and Avon Canal Trust
- Website: www.croftonbeamengines.org

Listed Building – Grade I
- Official name: Crofton Pumping Station
- Designated: 1 May 1985
- Reference no.: 1034049

Crofton Pumping Station, near the village of Great Bedwyn in Wiltshire, England, supplies the summit pound of the Kennet and Avon Canal with water.

The steam-powered pumping station is preserved and operates on selected weekends. It contains an operational Boulton & Watt steam engine dating from 1812, making it the oldest working beam engine in the world in its original engine house and capable of doing the job for which it was installed.

== Description ==
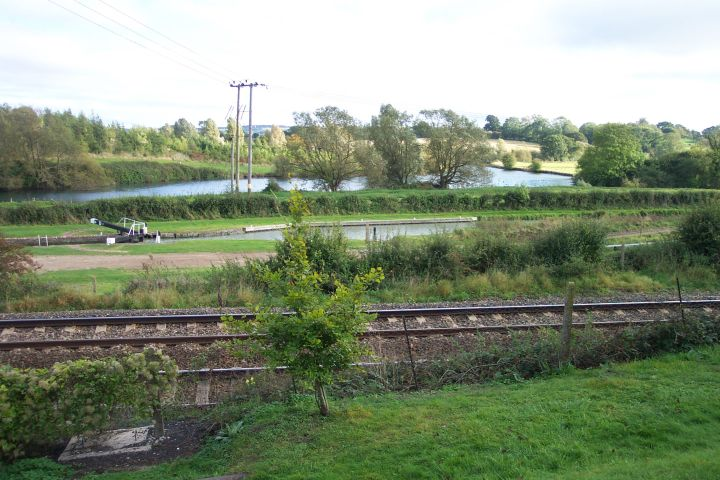
Wilton Water, the canal and railway from the pumping station

When the canal was built, no reliable water sources were available to fill the summit by normal gravitational means. However, a set of usable springs were found adjacent to the canal route about one mile (1.6 km) east of the summit pound, and about 40 feet (12 m) below it. Arrangements were made for these springs to feed the pound below lock 60 at Crofton Locks. Some years later a reservoir (Wilton Water) was created to improve the supply to this pound, and this can now be seen across the canal from the pumping station.

Water from below lock 60 was taken by a culvert to the foot of a well sunk from the pumping station, which is built on the hillside more than 40 feet (12 m) above the canal. The pumps take the water from this well and discharge it into a feeder channel next to the pumping station. The water flows along this channel under the force of gravity until it reaches the summit pound about one mile (1.6 km) to the west.

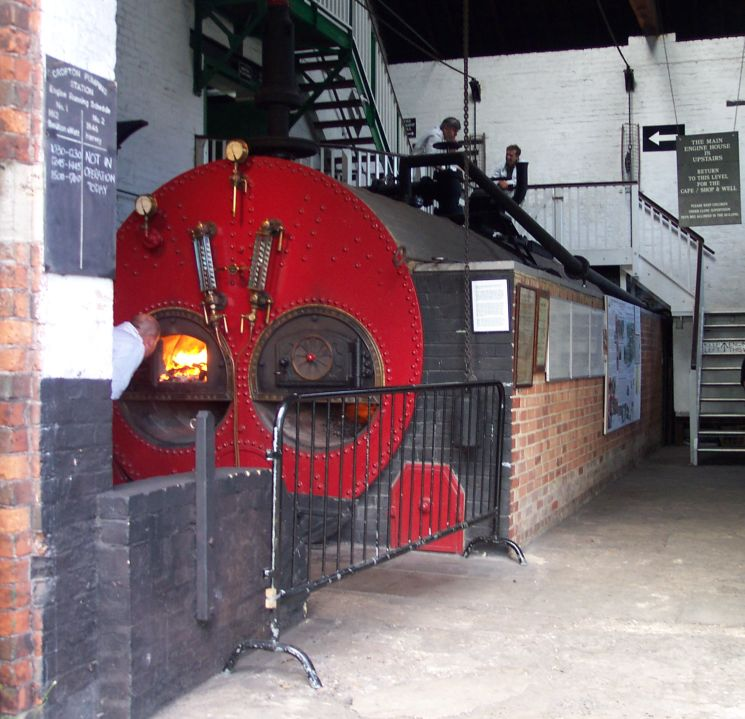
Inside the boilerhouse

For day-to-day operation, the pumping station now uses electric pumps, automatically controlled by the water level in the summit pound. However, the original steam driven pumping equipment has been preserved and is still operational. A single operable Lancashire boiler provides steam to the engines.

Number 1 engine, built by Boulton and Watt in 1812 and rebuilt as a Cornish engine in the 1840s, is a single-acting, condensing engine with a bore of 42.25 inches (1,073 mm), a stroke of 7 feet (2,100 mm) and indicated power of 38.6 kW (51.8 hp). It drives a 30-inch (760 mm) lift pump capable of lifting 2,274 pounds (1,031 kg), or approximately one ton of water, per stroke, at a rate of 11 strokes a minute.

Number 2 engine, built by Harvey and Co. of Hayle in 1846 as a double-acting Sims patent combined cylinder engine and rebuilt in 1903 to a Cornish Engine, is a single-acting, condensing engine with a bore of 42 inches (1,100 mm), a stroke of 7 feet 8 inches (2,340 mm) and indicated power of 42 kW (56 hp). It drives a 30-inch (760 mm) force pump capable of lifting 2,235 pounds (1,014 kg), or approximately one ton of water, per stroke, at a rate of 10.2 strokes a minute.

When the Great Western Railway built its railway line through the area, it passed very close to the station and between it and the canal. Access between the canal side and the pumping station is now via a very low roofed tunnel.

== History ==
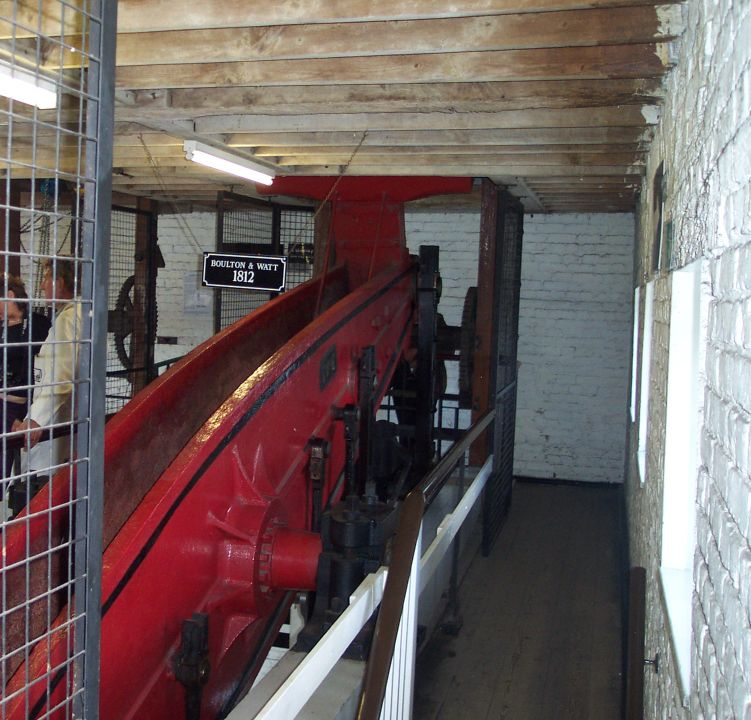
The beam gallery with the 1812 engine in operation

The pumping station was built between 1807 and 1809 in time for the opening of the canal in 1810. The station was built to house two pumping engines, but only one, a 36-inch (910 mm) bore engine bought second-hand from the West India Dock Company, was initially installed.

In 1810 a second engine was ordered from Boulton and Watt. This engine, which started work in 1812, is the current number 1 engine, and has been the main engine throughout the steam-driven life of the station.

In 1846 the original 1809 engine was replaced by a new engine supplied by Harvey and Co. and built as a double-acting Sims patent combined cylinder engine. However, this engine proved troublesome and eventually fell into disuse.

In 1903 the 1846 engine was rebuilt as a simple single-acting engine and thus became the current number 2 engine. Both engines then continued in regular use until the 1950s, when the state of the chimney forced the removal of the top 36 feet (11 m). The reduced height chimney was unable to provide sufficient draught for the boiler, and it proved cheaper to retire the steam engines and install electric pumps.

In 1968 the pumping station was bought by the Kennet and Avon Canal Trust with restoration in mind. The building and both engines were restored, and the existing irreparable boiler replaced with another of the same type acquired second hand. Number 1 engine was first successfully steamed on 4 April 1970 and the pumping station was officially reopened on 21 August the same year by John Betjeman. Number 2 engine was first successfully steamed on 15 November 1971.

The pumping station was designated as Grade I listed in 1985.

Initially the problem of the shortened chimney was overcome by the use of an electric fan to improve draught, but between 1996 and 1997 the chimney was repaired and restored to its full original height of 82 feet (25 m).

In July 2009, the modern electric pumps at Crofton failed. While awaiting repair, British Waterways contacted the Kennet and Avon Canal Trust who put Crofton into steam.

In 2012 the Boulton and Watt engine celebrated its 200th birthday. Several special steamings were held, including a visit from the Duke of Gloucester.

== Visiting ==
The pumping station opens to visitors and the engines are in steam on designated days.

== See also ==
- Claverton Pumping Station, another restored pumping station on the Kennet and Avon canal
