= Great Bedwyn =

Village in Wiltshire, England

Coordinates: 51.379°N 1.602°W

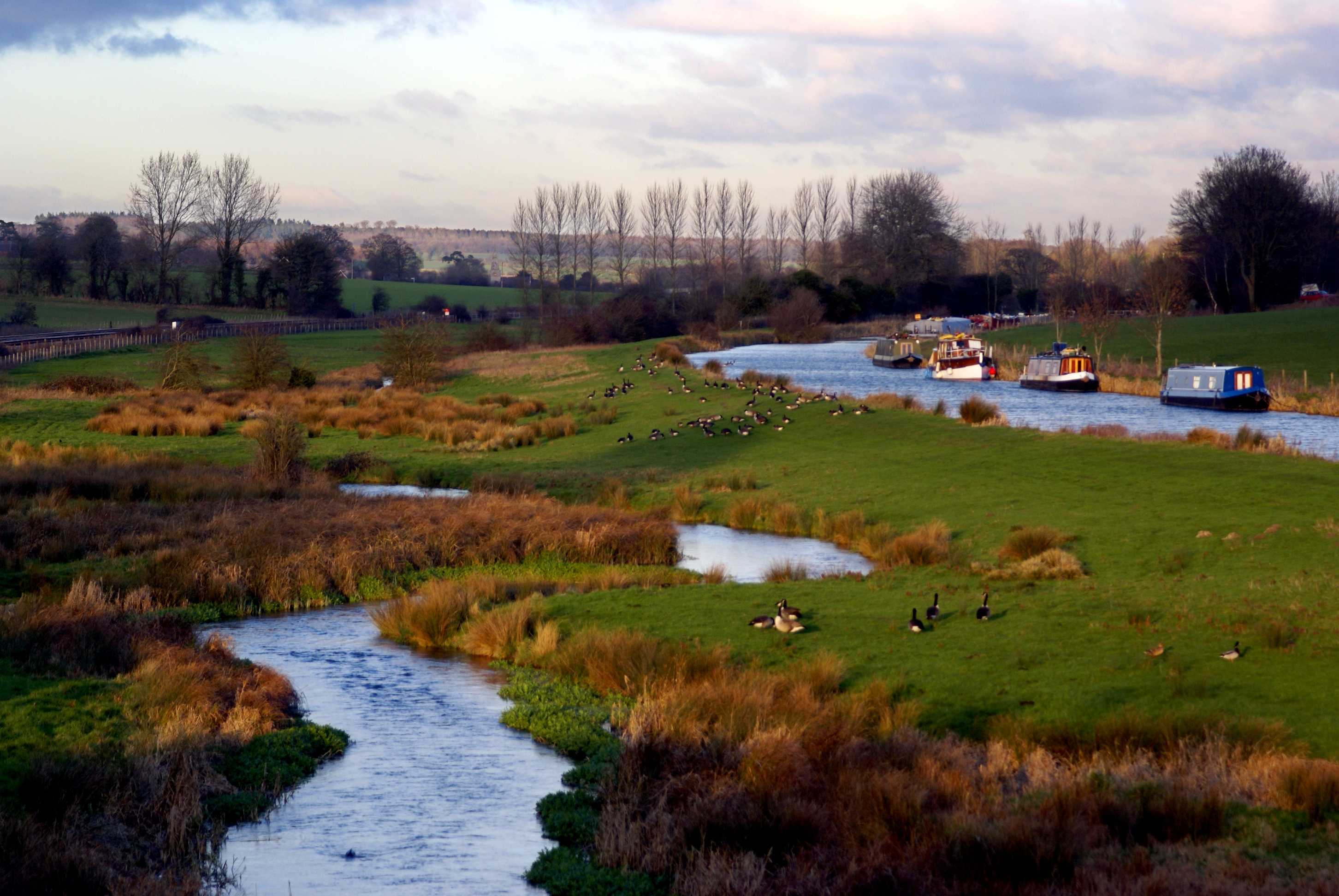
- View eastwards from Great Bedwyn showing river, canal and railway

- Location within Wiltshire
- Population: 1,353 (2011 census)
- OS grid reference: SU278645
- Civil parish: Great Bedwyn
- Unitary authority: Wiltshire
- Ceremonial county: Wiltshire
- Region: South West
- Country: England
- Sovereign state: United Kingdom
- Post town: Marlborough
- Postcode district: SN8
- Dialling code: 01672
- Police: Wiltshire
- Fire: Dorset and Wiltshire
- Ambulance: South Western
- UK Parliament: East Wiltshire
- Website: Parish Council

Great Bedwyn is a village and civil parish in east Wiltshire, England. The village is on the River Dun about 4.5 miles (7.2 km) southwest of Hungerford, 14 miles (23 km) southeast of Swindon and 6 miles (9.7 km) southeast of Marlborough.

The Kennet and Avon Canal and the Reading to Taunton line both follow the Dun and pass through the village. Bedwyn railway station is at Great Bedwyn and is the terminus of the rail commuter service via Reading and London Paddington.

The parish lies within the North Wessex Downs Area of Outstanding Natural Beauty. It includes the hamlets of Crofton and St Katharines, together with Tottenham House and part of its estate, Tottenham Park.

== History ==
=== Romans ===
A Roman road between Cirencester and Winchester crosses the parish, with Crofton on its route. Castle Copse, south of Great Bedwyn village, is the site of a Roman villa.

=== 'Bedanheafeford', the Battle of Bedwyn ===
The battle of 'Bedanheafeford' between Aescwine of Wessex and King Wulfhere of Mercia in 675 is alleged to have been fought near Great Bedwyn. The battle is recorded in the Anglo-Saxon Chronicle.

A.H. Burne interpreted 'Biedanheafde' as an early version of Bedwyn, the derivation of the name being "the head of the Bieda" or "Beda", a stream running through the Bedwyns. However placename interpretation is tenuous evidence for the battlefield location; the site of the battle has also been claimed for Beedon in Berkshire, and elsewhere.

The discovery of a number of skeletons at Crofton in 1892 by J.W. Brooke was later used to substantiate a local battlefield location. An account of the battle of Bedwyn was published by local historian Maurice Adams in 1903. However, only excavation of these graves will confirm if they contain battlefield victims.

Brooke recorded that "I cannot assign any period to them, but the field over them is paved with flint weapons. On one visit I observed children building miniature castles with human femur and tibiae." In a letter to Maurice Adams, B.H. Cunningham described the graves, five to seven in number, "radiating from a common centre like the spokes of a wheel". Unfortunately he had made no notes of his finds and was writing from memory. Mrs M.E. Cunnington's study of Saxon grave sites in Wiltshire noted that there was no evidence to support the belief that the Crofton site contained Saxon graves. Nearby finds consisted only of a La Tène earthenware pot. As the graves are within the site of a causewayed camp this is not surprising. Maurice Adams would not have known about the Crofton camp as it was undiscovered until an aerial survey in 1976.

Given the lack of evidence, Maurice Adam's confidence in a Bedwyn battlefield site cannot be shared. Until more substantial evidence about the Crofton graves can be gathered, there is no reason to suggest that the Bedwyn location, for an obscure 7th century battle, is anything more than a myth.

=== Reference in the will of King Alfred the Great ===
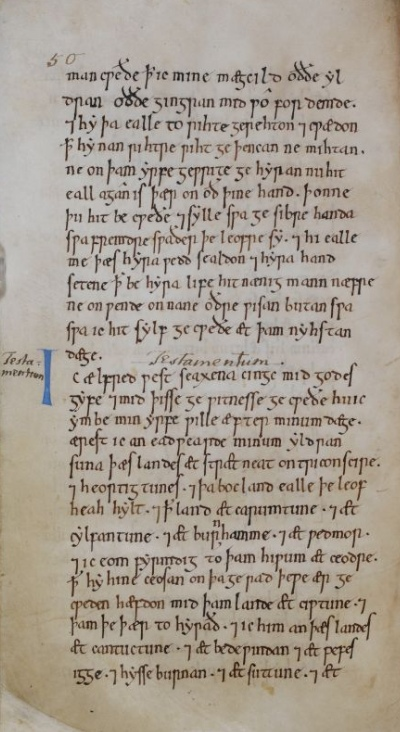
Will of Alfred the Great, AD 873–888, mentions Bedewindan (11th-century copy, British Library Stowe MS 944, ff. 29v–33r).

The last will and testament of King Alfred the Great contains reference to Bedwyn. Describing his elder son Edward's inheritance he writes "And I grant him the land at Cannington and at Bedwyn and at Pewsey ..." The Bedwyn of King Alfred was a large estate, whose territory included the modern parishes of Great and Little Bedwyn, Grafton, and Burbage. Bedwyn continues to enjoy an enduring royal pedigree. It belonged to the crown in 788, when part of the estate was granted to a crown servant called Bica. King Alfred's descendants held the estate until it was granted to Abingdon Abbey by King Edgar in 968. However the estate was recovered by King Athelred a few years later, and was recorded as a crown estate in the Domesday survey of 1086. Although most of the estate had passed into private hands by the end of the mediaeval period, the execution of Edward Seymour, Duke of Somerset, in 1552 resulted in the temporary return of much of Bedwyn to the crown. The disastrous finances of his descendants resulted in the great sale of 1929, and much of the former Bedwyn estate was purchased by the Crown Estate. They remain one of the largest landowners in modern Bedwyn.

== Religious sites ==
=== Church of St. Mary ===
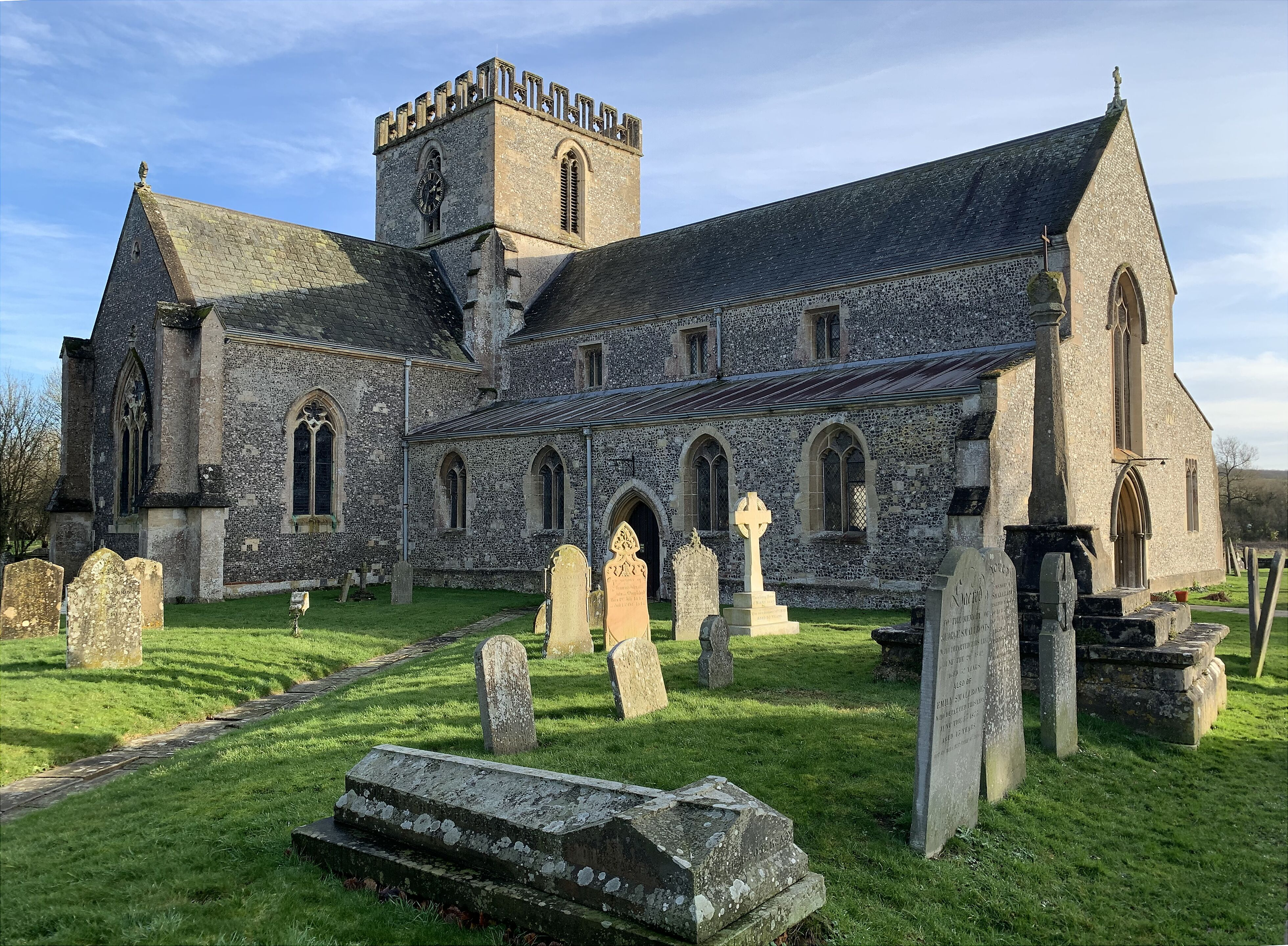
St. Mary's Church

The Church of England parish church of Saint Mary the Virgin has 12th-century origins. Beneath the church are substantial remains of a Saxon church begun in AD 905. In the chancel is a memorial to Sir John Seymour, father of King Henry VIII's wife Jane Seymour. The church is designated as a Grade I listed building, and a 14th-century limestone cross in the churchyard is Grade II*.

Thomas Willis (1621–1675), the great Oxford physician and natural philosopher, was born at Great Bedwyn on 27 January 1621 and was baptized on 14 February at the church.

=== Church of St. Katharine ===
St Katharine's was built by T.H. Wyatt in 1861, as the estate church for Tottenham House. In 1864, a parish was formed for it from parts of the parishes of Great Bedwyn, Little Bedwyn and Burbage. The church is Grade II* listed.

=== Methodist chapel ===
A Methodist chapel was opened c. 1810 in Church Street, Great Bedwyn. It was replaced by a chapel built in 1875 in Brown's Lane; this chapel closed in 1967.

== Canal and railway ==
The Kennet and Avon Canal was opened from Hungerford to Great Bedwyn in 1799, and from Great Bedwyn to Devizes in 1809. There are four locks in the parish: Burnt Mill Lock and Bedwyn Church Lock near the village, and two of the Crofton flight to the southwest.

In 1862 the Great Western Railway built the Berks and Hants Extension Railway from Hungerford to Pewsey and Devizes, closely following the north bank of the canal, with a station named Bedwyn at Great Bedwyn. There are regular services to Reading and London Paddington, and the station is a railhead for Marlborough which is served by buses that connect with the trains.

== Schools ==
A National School was built in Church Street, Great Bedwyn in 1835 and extended in 1856, becoming a Church of England primary school in 1963. The school moved to a new building on the outskirts of the village in 1994.

In the northwest of the parish, a church school was opened at St Katharine's in 1865 and continues in use.

The National School at East Grafton, opened in 1846, was used by children from Crofton; this school closed in 2011.

== Local government ==
The civil parish elects a parish council. It is in the area of Wiltshire Council unitary authority, which performs all significant local government functions.

In 1895 the southern portion of Great Bedwyn parish (south of the railway, including Wolfhall and East Grafton) became a new parish called Grafton. Wolfhall was transferred to Burbage parish in 1988.

== Parliamentary representation ==
Great Bedwyn was a parliamentary borough which elected two Members of Parliament (MPs) to the House of Commons from 1295 until 1832, when the borough was abolished by the Great Reform Act. The parish now falls within the East Wiltshire constituency.

== Notable people ==
A branch of the Hungerford family of Farleigh Hungerford owned land in the area. Members include Sir Anthony Hungerford (1567–1627), a religious controversialist, who sat in Parliament for Marlborough and later Great Bedwyn. He bought an estate at Marten (now in Grafton parish).

Thomas Willis (1621–1675), influential physician and anatomist, Oxford professor and one of the founders of the Royal Society, was born at Great Bedwyn.
