= Hungerford =

Market town in Berkshire, England

Coordinates: 51°24′50″N 1°30′54″W

- Town
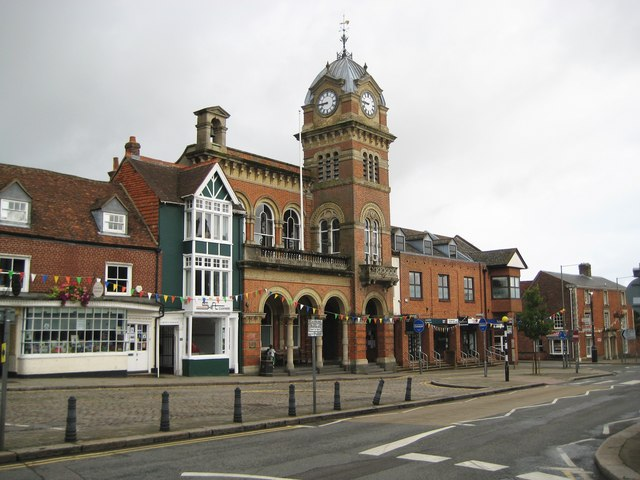
- Hungerford Town Hall

- Town symbol

- Location within Berkshire
- Area: 27.52 km^{2} (10.63 sq mi)
- Population: 5,869 (2021 Census)
  - Density: 213/km^{2} (550/sq mi)
- OS grid reference: SU334681
- Civil parish: Hungerford
- Unitary authority: West Berkshire
- Ceremonial county: Berkshire
- Region: South East
- Country: England
- Sovereign state: United Kingdom
- Post town: HUNGERFORD
- Postcode district: RG17
- Dialling code: 01488
- Police: Thames Valley
- Fire: Royal Berkshire
- Ambulance: South Central
- UK Parliament: Newbury
- Website: Town Council

Hungerford is a historic market town and civil parish, in Berkshire, England. It lies 8 miles (12.9 km) west of Newbury, 9 miles (14.5 km) east of Marlborough and 60 miles (97 km) west of London. The population of the parish at the 2021 census was 5,869.

== History ==
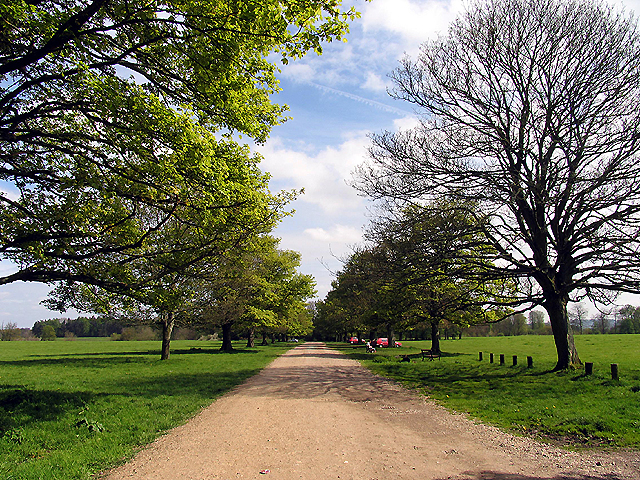
Hungerford Common

Hungerford is derived from an Anglo-Saxon name meaning "ford leading to poor land". The town's symbol is the estoile and crescent moon. The place is not described in the Domesday Book of 1086 because four ancient manors each owned some property within Hungerford, a possession located at the extreme western edge of the royal manor of Kintbury, in the ancient hundred of Kintbury. The manor of Standen Hussey, described as Standen in Wiltshire in Domesday, was later in Hungerford parish. The land was granted to Robert de Beaumont, 1st Earl of Leicester. When he died in 1118, he passed his English estates, including Hungerford, to his son Robert and his heirs who encouraged the town's growth over the next 70 years.

By 1241, Hungerford called itself a borough. In the late 14th century, John of Gaunt was lord of the manor and he granted the people the lucrative fishing rights on the river Kennet. The family of Walter Hungerford, 1st Baron Hungerford originated in the town (c.1450), although after three generations the title passed to Baroness Hungerford who married Sir Edward Hastings who became a Baron, and the family seat moved to Heytesbury, in Wiltshire. In the 16th century, the parish of Hungerford was included in the formation of the hundred of Kintbury Eagle.

During the Civil War, the Earl of Essex and his army spent the night here in June 1644. In October of the same year, the Earl of Manchester’s cavalry were quartered in the town. Then, in the November, Charles I’s forces arrived in Hungerford on their way to Abingdon. During the Glorious Revolution of 1688, William of Orange was offered the Crown of England while staying at the Bear Inn. The Hungerford land south of the river Kennet was for centuries, until a widespread growth in cultivation in the area in the 18th century, in Savernake Forest.

=== 1987 massacre ===
The Hungerford massacre occurred on 19 August 1987. A 27-year-old unemployed local labourer, Michael Ryan, armed with three legally-held firearms, a Type 56 assault rifle, a Beretta pistol and an M1 carbine, shot and killed 16 people in and around the town – including his mother – and wounded 15 others. He then killed himself in a local school, after being surrounded by armed police. All of his victims were shot in the town or in nearby Savernake Forest.

The home secretary, Douglas Hurd, commissioned a report on the massacre from the chief constable of Thames Valley Police, Colin Smith. The massacre was one of three significant firearms atrocities in the United Kingdom after the invention of rapid fire weapons such as the one involved; the other two were the Dunblane massacre and the Cumbria shootings. It led to the passing of the Firearms (Amendment) Act 1988, which banned the ownership of semi-automatic centre-fire rifles and restricted the use of shotguns with a magazine capacity of more than two rounds.

== Governance ==
Hungerford is a civil parish, covering the town and its surrounding rural area. The parish was divided historically into four tithings: Hungerford or Town, Sanden Fee, Eddington with Hidden and Newtown, and Charnham Street. North and South Standen and Charnham Street were detached parts of Wiltshire until transferred to Berkshire in 1895. Leverton and Calcot were transferred to Hungerford parish from Chilton Foliat in Wiltshire in 1894.

Parish council responsibilities are undertaken by Hungerford Town Council, which consists of fifteen volunteer councillors and committee members, supported by a full-time clerk; the mayor is elected from amongst their number. Hungerford & Kintbury electoral ward, which includes eight rural parishes to the east, elects three members of West Berkshire Council, a unitary authority.

Hungerford is part of the Newbury parliamentary constituency. Lee Dillon, of the Liberal Democrats, has been the MP since 2024.

== Geography ==
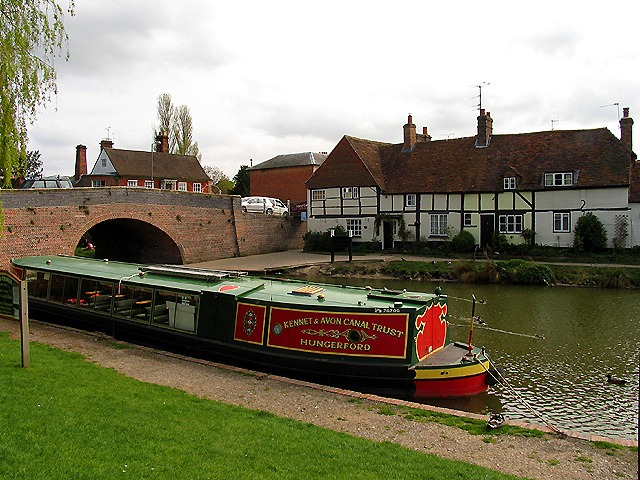
A narrowboat on the Kennet and Avon Canal

Hungerford is on the river Dun. It is the westernmost town in Berkshire, on the border with Wiltshire, in the North Wessex Downs. The highest point in the South East England region is the 297 m (974 ft) summit of Walbury Hill, 4 miles (6.4 km) from the town centre.

The Kennet and Avon Canal separates Hungerford from what might be described as the town's only suburb, the village of Eddington. Other settlements in the parish include Upper Eddington, Leverton and Hungerford Newtown. The canal opened in 1811 and passes through the town alongside the river Dun, a major tributary of the river Kennet. The confluence with the Kennet is to the north of the centre, whence canal and river both continue east.

The town has, as its western border, a county divide which also marks the border of the South East and South West England regions; it is 60 miles (97 km) west of London and 55 miles (89 km) east of Bristol on the A4. It is almost equidistant from the towns of Newbury and Marlborough. Freeman's Marsh, on the western edge of the town, is a Site of Special Scientific Interest.

=== Demography ===
Census Data (2021):
Output area	Usual residents	Female	Male	Ethnicity: White British	Health: Very Good / Good	Students (age 5+)	Total aged 16+	Economically active (aged 16+)	Not in employment (aged 16+)	Religion: Christian
Civil parish	5,870	3,065	2,804	5,676	4,923	857	4,837	2,919	1,977	2,943

== Transport ==
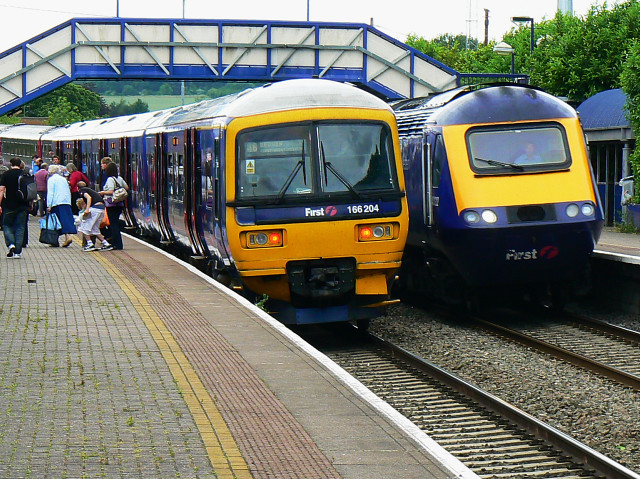
The town's railway station

Hungerford railway station lies on the Reading to Taunton line; a regular rail service is operated by Great Western Railway to Newbury, Reading and London Paddington.

As a result, Hungerford has developed into something of a commuter town, which has been slowly expanding since the 1980s; many residents commute to nearby towns such as Newbury, Swindon, Marlborough, Thatcham and Reading.

Bus services are provided by Newbury & District, Salisbury Reds and Swindon's Bus Company; routes connect the town with Bedwyn, Marlborough, Newbury and Swindon.

The town lies near to the M4 motorway, with access at junction 14, and the Old Bath Road (A4).

== Church ==
Hungerford Parish Church Repairing and Enlarging Act 1815
- Act of Parliament
- Parliament of the United Kingdom
- Long title: An Act for enlarging the Powers of an Act of His present Majesty, for repairing, enlarging, and improving the Parish Church of Hungerford, in the Counties of Berks and Wilts.
- Citation: 55 Geo. 3. c. xx

Dates
- Royal assent: 2 May 1815
Other legislation
Amends	Hungerford Parish Church Act 1811

Text of statute as originally enacted

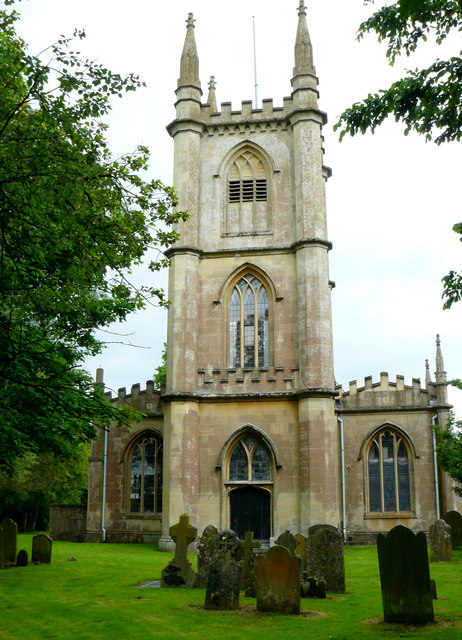
St. Lawrence's church

The parish church of St. Lawrence stands next to the Kennet and Avon Canal. It was rebuilt in 1814–16 by John Pinch the elder in the Gothic Revival style. The east window contains stained glass by Lavers and Westlake. The church is a Grade II* listed building.

== Sport and leisure ==
The town has several sports teams:

- Hungerford Cricket Club, with two senior teams in the Hampshire Cricket League, a midweek team in the Downs Evening League and a Junior section
- Its football team is Hungerford Town F.C., which plays at the Bulpit Lane ground
- A rugby team, Hungerford RFC
- A netball club
- Hungerford Archers, an archery club, uses the sports field of the John O'Gaunt School as its shooting ground
- Hungerford Hares running club was established in 2007.

== Hocktide ==
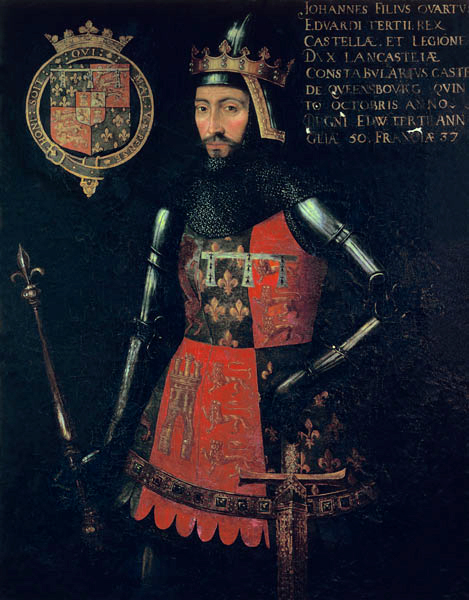
John of Gaunt

Hungerford is the only place in the country to have continuously celebrated Hocktide or Tutti Day, which is the second Tuesday after Easter. Today, it marks the end of the town council's financial and administrative year but, in the past, it was a more general celebration associated with the town's great patron, John of Gaunt. Its origins are thought to lie in celebrations following King Alfred's expulsion of the Vikings.

The Bellman, or town crier, summons the Commoners of the town to the Hocktide Court held at Hungerford Town Hall, while two florally decorated Tutti Men and the Orange Man visit every house with commoners' rights (almost a hundred properties), accompanied by six Tutti Girls, drawn from the local school. Originally they collected "head pennies" to ensure fishing and grazing rights. Today, they largely collect kisses from each lady of the house. In the court, the town's officers are elected for the coming year and the accounts examined. The court manages the town hall, the John of Gaunt Inn, the Common, Freeman's Marsh, and fishing rights in the rivers Kennet and Dun.

== Legends ==
There is an old legend that Hingwar the Dane, better known as Ivarr the Boneless, was drowned accidentally while crossing the Kennet here, and that the town was named after him. This stems from the, probably mistaken, belief that the Battle of Ethandun took place at Eddington in Berkshire, rather than Edington, Wiltshire, or Edington, Somerset.

== In literature ==
Hungerford is one of two places which arguably meet the criteria for Kennetbridge in Thomas Hardy's novel Jude the Obscure, being "a thriving town not more than a dozen miles south of Marygreen" (Fawley), and is between Melchester (Salisbury) and Christminster (Oxford). The main A338 road from Oxford to Salisbury runs through Hungerford. The other contender is the larger town of Newbury.

== Notable people ==
- Ollie Allan, rugby player
- Charlie Austin, footballer
- Adam Brown, actor, comedian and pantomime performer
- Samuel Chandler, Nonconformist theologian and preacher
- Christopher Derrick, author
- Edward Duke (1779–1852), antiquary
- Ralph Evans (1915–1996), footballer
- John of Gaunt, 1st Duke of Lancaster, son of King Edward III
- William Greatrakes, connected with the authorship of the Letters of Junius
- Nicholas Monro (b. 1936), artist, had a studio at Hungerford
- George Pocock (1774–1843), the founder of the Tent Methodist Society and inventor of the Charvolant
- Charles Portal, 1st Viscount Portal of Hungerford, Chief of the Air Staff during most of World War II and Marshal of the Royal Air Force
- Reginald Portal, admiral
- Henry "Harry" Quelch (1858–1913), one of the first British Marxists
- Edmund Roche, 5th Baron Fermoy, maternal uncle of Diana, Princess of Wales, died in Hungerford in 1984
- Robert Snooks, last highwayman to be hanged in England, born in Hungerford in 1761
- James E. Talmage, (1862–1933) LDS Church leader, writer and theologian. Author of Jesus the Christ
- Jethro Tull (agriculturist), died in the town
- Will Young, singer.

== Freedom of the Town ==
The following people have received the Freedom of the Town of Hungerford:

- Jennifer Bartter: 3 September 2022
- Martin Crane: 3 September 2022
- Penny Locke: 3 September 2022.

== Twin towns ==
Hungerford is twinned with Ligueil, in Indre-et-Loire, France.
