= Blackwell (surname) =

Blackwell is a surname of British origin. Notable people with the surname include:

- A. J. Blackwell (1842–1903), American founder of and namesake to Blackwell, Kay County, Oklahoma
- Adam Blackwell, 21st century Canadian diplomat
- Alan F. Blackwell (born 1962), New Zealand-British cognition scientist
- Albert T. Blackwell Jr. (1925–2022), Justice of the Maryland Court of Appeals
- Alex Blackwell (basketball) (born 1970), American basketball player
- Alex Blackwell (born 1983), female cricketer for New South Wales and Australia, identical twin sister of Kate
- Alexander Blackwell (c.1700–1747), Scottish adventurer, husband of Elizabeth Blackwell
- Alice Stone Blackwell (1857–1950), American feminist, suffragist, journalist, and human rights advocate
- Anna Blackwell (1816–1900), English writer
- Antoinette Brown Blackwell (1825–1921), American preacher and activist, first woman ordained as a minister in the US, wife of Samuel C. Blackwell
- Basil Blackwell (1889–1984), English publisher, son of Benjamin Henry Blackwell
- Ben Blackwell (born 1982), American musician, writer, and archivist, founder of Cass Records
- Benjamin Henry Blackwell (1849–1924), English bookseller and politician, founder of Blackwell's chain of bookshops
- Betsy Blackwell (1905–85), American editor of women's magazines
- Brian Blackwell (born 1986), English schoolboy convicted of the manslaughter of his parents
- Bubba Blackwell (born 1966), American stunt performer and motorcycle jumping world record holder
- Caesar Blackwell (1769–1845), enslaved African-American preacher
- Carlyle Blackwell (1884–1955), American silent film actor, director, and producer
- Charles Blackwell (disambiguation), multiple people
- Charlie Blackwell (1894–1935), American Negro league baseball player
- Chris Blackwell (born 1937), English founder of Island Records
- Colin Blackwell (born 1993), American ice hockey player
- Cory Blackwell (born 1963), American basketball player
- David Blackwell (1919–2010), American mathematician
- Dean Blackwell (born 1969), English footballer
- Deborah Blackwell (1950–2014), American television executive
- Dewayne Blackwell (1939–2021), American songwriter
- Donald Blackwell (1921–2010), British astronomer
- Douglas Blackwell (1924–2009), British actor
- Ed Blackwell (1929–1992), American jazz drummer
- Edith Winstone Blackwell (1877–1956), New Zealand philanthropist
- Edward Blackwell, a mistaken name for Edward Backwell, 17th century English goldsmith banker and public official
- Elise Blackwell (born 1964), American novelist
- Elizabeth Blackwell (doctor) (1821–1910), British-American physician, first woman to receive a medical degree in the US, first woman on the UK Medical Register
- Elizabeth Blackwell (illustrator) (1707–1758), Scottish botanical illustrator and author
- Elizabeth Marianne Blackwell (1889–1973), English botanist and mycologist
- Ellen Wright Blackwell (1864–1952), writer and botanist, influential in New Zealand
- Emily Blackwell (1826–1910), British-American physician, one of the first American women physicians, sister of Elizabeth (physician) and Sarah
- Ernest Blackwell (1894–1964), English footballer
- Ernley Blackwell (1868–1941), British lawyer and civil servant
- Ewell Blackwell (1922–1996), American baseball pitcher
- Fred Blackwell (1891–1975), American baseball player
- Genieve Blackwell (active from 1989), Australian female Anglican bishop
- George Blackwell (c.1545–1613), English Roman Catholic Archpriest
- George Lincoln Blackwell (1861–1926), African-American author and bishop
- Gloria Blackwell (1927–2010), African-American civil rights activist and educator
- Harolyn Blackwell (born 1955), American theatrical and classical soprano
- Harry Blackwell (1900–1956), English footballer
- Harry Ellis Blackwell (1908–1984), American politician from Missouri
- Helen Blackwell (born 1972), American chemist
- Henry Blackwell (disambiguation), multiple people
- Hugh Blackwell (born 1944), American politician (North Carolina)
- Ian Blackwell (born 1978), English cricketer
- Isaac Blackwell (before 1664–1699), English organist and composer
- Jack Blackwell (1909–2001), English footballer
- James Blackwell (disambiguation), multiple people
- Jannie L. Blackwell (active from 1992), American politician, widow of Lucien E. Blackwell
- Jaydin Blackwell (born 2004), American Paralympic sprinter
- Jerry Blackwell (1949–1995), American professional wrestler
- Jerry W. Blackwell (born 1962), American lawyer and judge
- John Blackwell (disambiguation), multiple people
- Josh Blackwell (born 1999), American football player
- Julius W. Blackwell (1797–after 1845), US Congressman from Tennessee
- Kate Blackwell (cricketer) (born 1983), Australian female cricketer for New South Wales and Australia
- Keith R. Blackwell (active after 2012), American judge
- Kelly Blackwell (born 1969), American football player
- Ken Blackwell (born 1948), American politician and activist
- Kevin Blackwell (born 1948), English football goalkeeper and manager
- Kory Blackwell (born 1972), American football player
- Laura Christine Blackwell (1878–1953), Canadian opera singer
- Leslie Blackwell (1897–1959), Canadian politician, soldier, lawyer, and land developer
- Lucien E. Blackwell (1931–2003), U.S. Congressman from Pennsylvania, husband of Jannie L. Blackwell
- Luke Blackwell (born 1986), Australian Rules footballer
- Marion Blackwell (1928–2026), Australian landscape architect and ecologist
- Marlon Blackwell (active from 1996 to at least 2014), American architect and academic
- Marquel Blackwell (born 1979), American football player
- Meredith Blackwell (born 1940), American mycologist
- Morton Blackwell (born 1939), American conservative political activist
- Nate Blackwell (born 1965), American basketball player
- Nick Blackwell (born 1990), British professional boxer
- Nigel Blackwell (born 1963), British frontman and songwriter of the band Half Man Half Biscuit
- Norman Blackwell, Baron Blackwell (born 1952) British businessman, public servant, politician, campaigner, and policy advisor
- Olin G. Blackwell (1915–1986) American prison official, fourth and final warden of Alcatraz Federal Penitentiary
- Otis Blackwell (1931–2002), American songwriter, singer, and pianist
- Otto B. Blackwell (1884–1970), American electrical engineer
- Pam Blackwell (born 1942), American Jungian educator and theorist, playwright, and novelist
- Paul Blackwell (actor) (1954–2019), Australian actor
- Paul Blackwell (footballer) (born 1963), Welsh footballer
- Randolph Blackwell (1927–1981), American civil rights activist
- Richard Blackwell (1922–2008), aka Mr Blackwell, American fashion critic best known for his annual "worst dressed" lists
- Richard Blackwell (MP) (by 1517–1568), English Member of Parliament
- Robby Blackwell (born 1986), American singer-songwriter, producer, and instrumentalist
- Robert Blackwell (1918–1985), American bandleader, songwriter, arranger, and record producer
- Robert L. Blackwell (1895–1918), American Medal of Honor recipient
- Roger Blackwell (active from 1999), American marketing expert and public speaker
- Rory Blackwell (1933–2019), British rock and roll musician
- S. L. Blackwell (c. 1833–after 1878), American miner and politician (California)
- Samuel Charles Blackwell (1823–1901), Anglo-American abolitionist, husband of Antoinette Brown Blackwell
- Sarah Ellen Blackwell (1828–1901), American biographer and artist; sister of Elizabeth (physician) and Emily
- Scott Blackwell (active from 1992 to after 2011), American disk jockey and Christian dance music artist
- Scrapper Blackwell (1903–1962), American blues musician
- Simon Blackwell (born 1966), British comedy writer and producer
- Slade Blackwell (born 1968), American politician
- Susan Blackwell (active from 1995 to after 2008), American actress
- Suzanne Blackwell, New Zealand psychologist
- Thomas Blackwell (disambiguation), multiple people
- Tim Blackwell (baseball) (born 1952), American baseball player
- Tom Blackwell (1938–2020), American photorealist painter
- Trevor Blackwell (born 1969), Canadian computer programmer, engineer, and entrepreneur
- Unita Blackwell (1933–2019), American civil rights activist, the first African-American woman to be elected mayor in the state of Mississippi
- Victor Blackwell (born 1981), American journalist and television news anchor
- W. Blackwell (fl. 1835), English cricketer
- Wayne Blackwell (born 1960), Australian rules footballer
- Will Blackwell (born 1975), American football player
- William Blackwell (disambiguation), multiple people
- Yahu Blackwell (born 1986), Professional boxer and Ghanaian royal

== See also ==
- Blackwell (disambiguation)
