= Girdwood =

Girdwood may refer to:

== Places ==
- Girdwood, Anchorage, Alaska, a community within the southern extent of the Municipality of Anchorage in the state of Alaska
  - Girdwood Airport in Girdwood, in Anchorage Borough, Alaska, United States
  - Girdwood Depot, a passenger railroad station in Girdwood, south of Anchorage, Alaska
- Girdwood, a railway flag stop on the Sudbury–White River train, Ontario, Canada

== People with the surname ==
- Eric Girdwood (1876–1963), British military officer who served as General Officer Commanding the Northern Ireland District from 1931 to 1935
- Gilbert Girdwood (1832–1917), English army and civilian physician and surgeon, academic and author, noted for his service in the Canadian Army
- Ronald Girdwood (1917–2006), Scottish medical doctor, Professor of Medicine at the University of Edinburgh and a President of the Royal College of Physicians of Edinburgh
