= S. L. Blackwell =

American politician

S. L. Blackwell (born ca. 1833) was an American politician. He was a California miner and Assemblyman (1875–76 and 1877–78) representing Nevada County. A native of North Carolina, he arrived in California via Tennessee in 1853, and resided at Moores Flat and Snow Point, while developing a gravel mine. A member of the Democratic Party, Blackwell served as chairman of the Assembly's Committee on Mines and Mining.
