= Charles Blackwell =

Charles Blackwell may refer to:

- Charles Blackwell (engineer) (1843–1906), civil engineer
- Charlie Blackwell (1894–1935), American baseball outfielder
- Charles Blackwell (music arranger) (1940–2024), English record producer, arranger and songwriter
- Charles W. Blackwell (1942–2013), American Chickasaw Nation diplomat and lawyer
- Charles Gray Blackwell (1939–2012), state legislator in Mississippi
- Charles Blackwell (politician) (born 1962), state legislator in Mississippi
