= Alex Blackwell (disambiguation) =

Alex Blackwell (born 1983) is a female cricketer for New South Wales and Australia.

Alex Blackwell may also refer to:

- Alex Blackwell (basketball) (born 1970), American basketball player
- Alexander Blackwell (c.1700–1747), Scottish adventurer

== See also ==
- Blackwell (surname), for other people with that surname
