= Mothers Favorite Child =

American soul music collective

Background information
- Origin: United States
- Genres: Soul, contemporary R&B, jazz, funk, dance
- Years active: 2003–present
- Labels: Reel People Music, New Sound Network
- Website: mothersfavoritechild.com

Mothers Favorite Child is an American music collective founded and led by songwriter, producer and businessman Paris Mark Toon. The project spans across the soul, R&B, jazz, funk, and dance genres and features collaborations with vocalists, musicians, and remix producers. The collective released their single, "Purple Funk" featuring CeCe Peniston which peaked at number #2 on the Billboard Hot Singles chart.

== Career ==
Paris Toon began as a songwriter and producer with influences derived from soul, funk, hip-hop, R&B and jazz. He founded Mothers Favorite Child as a collective focused on live musicianship and the collaborative effort of both singers and instrumentalists, as well as remix producers. Mothers Favorite Child is Paris Toon’s flagship venture. The project is celebrated for its unique combination of live band musicianship and contemporary soul and dance productions.

Under the Mothers Favorite Child banner, Paris Toon has worked with soul, R&B, jazz, funk, and dance artists such as Robin S., CeCe Peniston, Adina Howard, George Benson, Nik West and many more. In 2025, Toon was invited to be the Keynote speaker at the MusicXchange Conference (South Africa) and has a reputation for presenting Master Class lessons in music production.

== Musical style ==
The style of music produced under Mothers Favorite Child encompasses the styles of soul, R&B, jazz, funk, hip-hop, and dance music. Toon’s compositions often feature elements of grove, warmth, musicianship, and vocalist talent.

== Discography ==
=== Albums and compilation albums ===
Year	Title	Release type
2017	Law of Attraction	Studio album
2019	Mothers Favorite Child	Studio album
2023	Alienlove	Compilation album
2024	Purple Funk (Deluxe Edition)	Studio album
2024	DANCE FUNK R&B (Opolopo Remix)	Remix album
2025	Cobra Queen	Studio album

=== Singles and EPs ===
Year	Title	Credited artist / featured artist
2017	Purple Funk	Mothers Favorite Child featuring CeCe Peniston
2017	Purple Funk (feat. CeCe Peniston)	Mothers Favorite Child featuring CeCe Peniston
2018	Brooklyn Baby (Skate Mix)	Mothers Favorite Child
2020	Reflections of a Disco Ball (feat. Tanya Tiet)	Mothers Favorite Child featuring Tanya Tiet
2020	Purple Funk (feat. Saeeda Wright & Chubb Rock)	Mothers Favorite Child featuring Saeeda Wright and Chubb Rock
2020	Reflections of a Disco Ball (Joey Negro Remixes)	Mothers Favorite Child featuring Tanya Tiet
2021	Every Time (Ezel Remixes)	Mothers Favorite Child featuring Morris Alan
2021	Hey DJ	Mothers Favorite Child featuring Saeeda Wright
2022	Sunday	Spring The Artist and Mothers Favorite Child
2022	No Evil	Spring The Artist and Mothers Favorite Child
2022	Butterfly Tears	Spring The Artist and Mothers Favorite Child
2022	That's Why	Spring The Artist and Mothers Favorite Child
2022	Purple Funk	Mothers Favorite Child, Rubber People and Saeeda Wright
2023	SAY YES	Mothers Favorite Child
2023	Purple Funk (Opolopo Remixes)	Mothers Favorite Child, Saeeda Wright and Opolopo
2023	Tonight (Opolopo Remixes)	Mothers Favorite Child and Robin S.
2023	Dance for Me (Ezel Remixes)	Mothers Favorite Child, Saeeda Wright and Ezel
2024	Purple Funk (GeMiNi Remix)	Mothers Favorite Child
2024	Shoulda Been	Mothers Favorite Child
2024	Gently	Mothers Favorite Child and Giuliette Price
2025	Numb (Love Songs from the Vault)	Mothers Favorite Child
2025	Brooklyn Avenue	Mothers Favorite Child
2025	Saturday	Zee Dyasi and Mothers Favorite Child
2026	Send It On	Mothers Favorite Child featuring Zee Dyasi
2026	Vacation	Zee Dyasi and Mothers Favorite Child
2026	Bait (Opolopo Remix)	Mothers Favorite Child featuring Saeeda Wright
2026	Body	Mothers Favorite Child featuring Saeeda Wright
2026	This Is Love	Mothers Favorite Child featuring Saeeda Wright
2026	This Is Love (DJ Emmaculate Remix)	Mothers Favorite Child featuring Saeeda Wright and Robin S.
2026	This Is Love (Maxi Single)	Mothers Favorite Child featuring Saeeda Wright
2026	Dirty	Mothers Favorite Child featuring Morris Alan

== Associated acts ==
- Robin S.
- CeCe Peniston
- Adina Howard
- George Benson
- Morris Alan
- John Blackwell
- Saeeda Wright
