= Wootton Rivers Lock =

Canal lock in Wiltshire, England

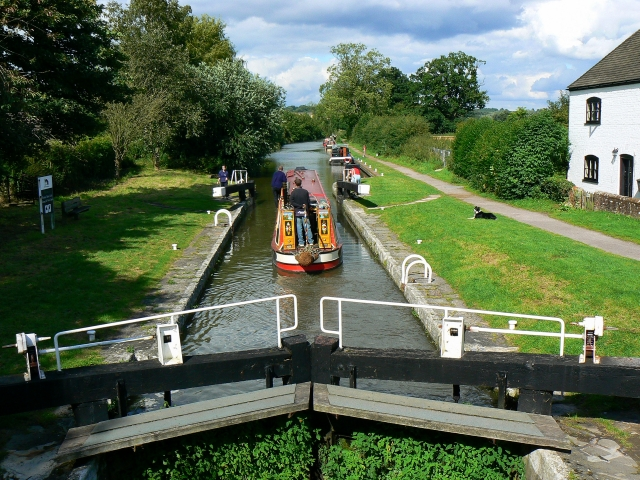
- Wootton Rivers Lock, the first of four in the parish
- Interactive map of Wootton Rivers Lock
- 51.36482°N 1.71699°W
- Waterway: Kennet and Avon Canal
- Maintained by: Canal & River Trust
- Operation: Manual
- First built: 1810
- Length: 70 feet (21.3 m)
- Width: 13 feet 2 inches (4.01 m)
- Fall: 8 feet (2.4 m)
- One of four locks to reach the summit level

Wootton Rivers Lock, also called Wootton Rivers Bottom Lock, is a lock on the Kennet and Avon Canal at Wootton Rivers, Wiltshire, England. It was built between 1804 and 1810, as the Pewsey to Great Bedwyn was the last section of the canal to be built. It was dependant for its water supply on Crofton Pumping Station, at the eastern end of the summit level.

The lock became dry in 1958 after demolition of part of the chimney at Crofton Pumping Station prevented the steam engines from operating. Water supplies were restored in 1989, just prior to the full reopening of the canal after years of restoration. Water for the canal to the west of the nearby summit level is largely supplied from the River Avon at Claverton by backpumping systems, and the final one to pump water from below the lock to the summit pound at Wootton Top Lock was installed in 1998, paid for by a Heritage Lottery grant.

== History ==
The Kennet and Avon Canal was built in three stages. The first was the canalisation of the River Kennet from Reading to Newbury, which was built between 1718 and 1723. Next to be constructed was the canalisation of the River Avon between Bath and Bristol, which was built between 1725 and 1727. After a long break, a canal between Newbury and Bath was authorised by the Kennet and Avon Canal Act 1794 (34 Geo. 3. c. 90). John Rennie was the engineer for this phase.

After obtaining the act, the committee appointed to manage the work decided that they would build a broad canal, suitable for boats 70 feet (21 m) long by 13.5 feet (4.1 m) wide, rather than a narrow canal. The canal was opened in stages as sections were completed. From Newbury, it reached Hungerford in 1798, and Great Bedwyn in 1799. There were financial difficulties, but in the west the section from Foxhanger near Devizes to Bath was completed in 1804, and work of the section from Devizes to Pewsey was underway in 1803, but no work had been done on the final section between Pewsey and Great Bedwyn, which included the route through Wootton Rivers. The Devizes to Pewsey section was opened in 1807, although the 29 locks of the Caen Hill Flight at Devizes had not been completed. Pewsey was just 3.5 miles (5.6 km) to the west of Wootton Rivers.

Had Rennie's original plans been followed, there would have been no lock at Wootton Rivers. He had proposed a tunnel 4,312 yards (3,943 m) long from Crofton to Wootton Rivers which would have been around 40 feet (12 m) lower than the present summit level. This was at a level where there was a natural water supply, and would have made a summit level that was 15 miles (24 km) long, acting as a large reservoir which would have terminated at Devizes. The engineer William Jessop was asked for a second opinion, and he suggested building the canal at a higher level, which would not need a tunnel at all, but would need a pumping station to provide a water supply. Jessop estimated that this would save £41,000 in construction costs, and would be competed two years earlier. The short Bruce Tunnel at Savernake, 502 yards (459 m) long, was built after Lord Ailesbury objected to a cutting 50 feet (15 m) deep through his land, which would have been visible from his Tottenham Park pleasure grounds.

Jessop's suggestion was implemented, and the change in level required four locks at the western end, with the canal rising through Wootton Rivers Bottom Lock, Heathy Close Lock, Brimslade Lock and Wootton Top Lock, all in the parish of Wootton Rivers, as well as most of the Crofton Locks at the eastern end. Crofton Pumping Station supplied water from local springs to the summit level, but more water was needed, and an 8-acre (3.2 ha) reservoir known as Wilton Water was constructed in 1836 by damming the nearby River Dun, from which additional supplies could be drawn. The work was carried out by John Blackwell.

Wootton Rivers Bottom Lock was built during the final phase of construction between 1804 and 1810. The lock has a rise/fall of 8 ft 0 in (2.43 m). During the 20th century the condition of the canal declined until much of it was derelict, and the Kennet and Avon Canal Association was formed in 1951 to lobby for its restoration. Despite their efforts, Wootton Rivers Lock lost its water supply in 1958, when the chimney at Crofton Pumping Station was declared to be unsafe, and the top 30 feet (9.1 m) were removed. The loss of draught meant that the steam engines could no longer operate, resulting in the summit pound and the locks at both ends drying out. Crofton Locks were rewatered in August 1988 using electric pumps, and an opening cerememony was held, but the pounds leaked, and the canal remained dry until the flight was re-puddled in 1989.

This did not resolve the issues for Wootton Rivers Lock, as in May 1989 British Waterways issued a report on water supplies for the restored canal. It stated that the canal west of Crofton would have to be supplied with water from the River Avon at Claverton. Back pumping systems at Seend, Semington and Bradford would need to be upgraded, and new systems at Crofton, Wootton Rivers, Devizes and Widcombe would be needed. British Waterways agreed to pay for the upgrading of existing systems, but the cost of the new ones and dredging of the canal, estimated at £2.5 million, would have to be found elsewhere. Several boats travelled west from Newbury to Devizes during the Spring Bank Holiday of 1989, and others travelled east from Pewsey to Hungerford. They were the first boats to use Wootton Rivers Lock since 1951.

Work on the Wootton Rivers back pumping scheme eventually began on 26 October 1998. G Pearce Civil Engineering were awarded the contract valued at £600,000, most of it coming from a Heritage Lottery grant. They were based at Devizes, and intended to transport the materials for the installation along the canal by barge. A pumping station was built beneath the towpath at Wootton Rivers road bridge, to house the electric pumps, and a 1-mile (1.6 km) pipeline buried beneath the towpath discharged into an outfall chamber on the summit pound just above Wootton Top Lock, which is also known as Cadley Lock. As part of the contract, bywash weirs were constructed around the four locks of the Wootton Rivers flight. The locks were also equipped with landing stages at both ends, and moorings near the pumping station were made by piling the bank.

The lock and its road bridge are Grade II listed structures.

== See also ==
- Locks on the Kennet and Avon Canal

Next lock upstream	Kennet and Avon Canal	Next lock downstream
Heathy Close Lock	Wootton Rivers Lock; Grid reference: SU198629	Caen Hill Locks
