= Belpaire firebox =

Type of firebox used on steam locomotives

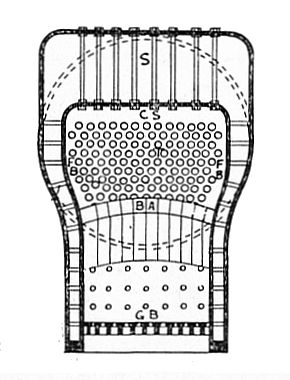
Diagramatic cross section of the Belpaire fire box showing the increased volume for evaporation and larger volume of water contained in the square section above the box. The hatched circles show the outline of the barrel to which the firebox was attached.

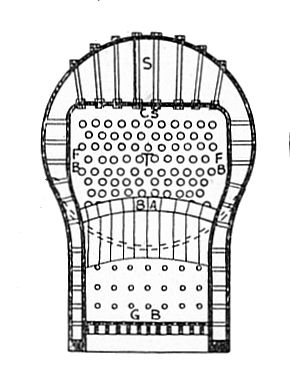
A Round-topped firebox cross section shown for comparison. Note the angling of the stays.

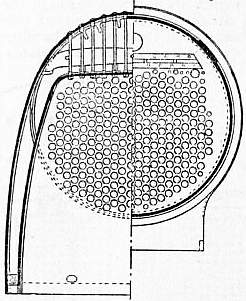
Pacific-type flat-topped inner firebox

The Belpaire firebox is a type of firebox used on steam locomotives. It was invented by Alfred Belpaire of Belgium in 1864. Today it generally refers to the shape of the outer shell of the firebox which is approximately flat at the top and square in cross-section, indicated by the longitudinal ridges on the top sides. However, it is the similar square cross-section inner firebox which provides the main advantages of this design i.e. it has a greater volume above the crown of the firebox where the heat is greatest, providing for improved ebullition and steam production, compared with a round-top shape.

The flat firebox top would make supporting it against pressure more difficult (e.g. by means of girders, or stays) compared to a round-top. However, the use of a similarly shaped square outer boiler shell allows simpler perpendicular stays to be used between the shells. The Belpaire outer firebox is, nevertheless, more complicated and expensive to manufacture than a round-top version.

Due to the increased expense involved in manufacturing this boiler shell, just two major US railroads adopted the Belpaire firebox, the Pennsylvania and the Great Northern. In Britain most locomotives employed the design after the 1920s, except notably those of the LNER.

== Description ==
In steam boilers, the firebox is encased in a water jacket on five sides, (front, back, left, right and top) to ensure maximum heat transfer to the water. Stays are used to support the surfaces against the high pressure between the outside wall and the interior firebox wall, and partially to conduct heat into the boiler interior.

In many boiler designs, the top of the boiler is cylindrical above the firebox, matching the contour of the rest of the boiler and naturally resisting boiler pressure more easily. In the Belpaire design, the outer upper boiler wall sheets are roughly parallel with the flat upper firebox sheets giving it a squarer shape. The advantage was a greater surface area for evaporation, and less susceptibility to priming (foaming), involving water getting into the cylinders, compared with the narrowing upper space of a classic cylindrical boiler. This allowed G.J. Churchward, the chief mechanical engineer of the Great Western Railway, to dispense with a steam dome to collect steam. Churchward also improved the Belpaire design, maximising the flow of water in a given size of boiler by tapering the firebox and boiler barrel outwards to the area of highest steam production at the front of the firebox.

The shape of the Belpaire firebox also allows easier placement of the boiler stays, because they are at right angles to the sheets.

Despite these claimed advantages, other locomotive boilers such as the LNER Engine Pacifics had flat-topped inner fireboxes with round-topped outer shells and with as good a thermal performance as the Belpaire type, without suffering major problems with staying between shells.

In the USA, the Belpaire firebox was introduced in about 1882 or 83 by R. P. C. Sanderson, who at the time was working for the Shenandoah Valley Railroad (essentially a subsidiary of the Pennsylvania Railroad, since they shared the same financial backing from E. W. Clark & Co.). Sanderson was an Englishman (later naturalized as an American citizen) who had attained his engineering degree from Cassel in Germany in 1875.

Having obtained knowledge of a special form of locomotive boiler (the Belpaire), Sanderson wrote to an old acquaintance from his college days who was working at the Henschel locomotive factory at Cassel. He sent Sanderson a tracing of Henschel's latest Belpaire boiler. When shown the design, Charles Blackwell, Superintendent of Motive Power for the Shenandoah Valley Railroad, was very pleased with the design and placed an order with the Baldwin and Grant Locomotive Works for two passenger engines, afterwards numbered 94 and 95, and five freight engines, afterwards numbered, 56, 57, 58, 59, and 60. That marked the beginning of the use of the Belpaire-type locomotive boiler in the United States. The Pennsylvania Railroad used Belpaire fireboxes on nearly all of its steam locomotives. The distinctive square shape of the boiler cladding at the firebox end of locomotives practically became a "Pennsy" trademark, as otherwise only the Great Northern used Belpaire fireboxes in significant numbers in the USA.

== Gallery ==
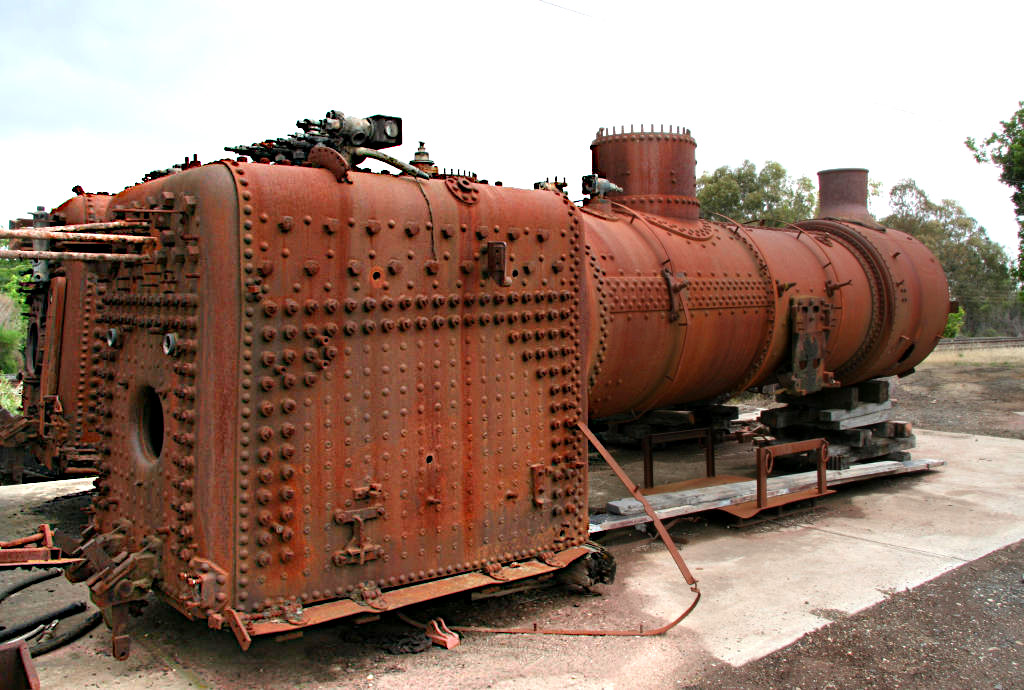
A Victorian Railways J class Belpaire firebox and boiler, in storage. A second firebox can be seen behind.

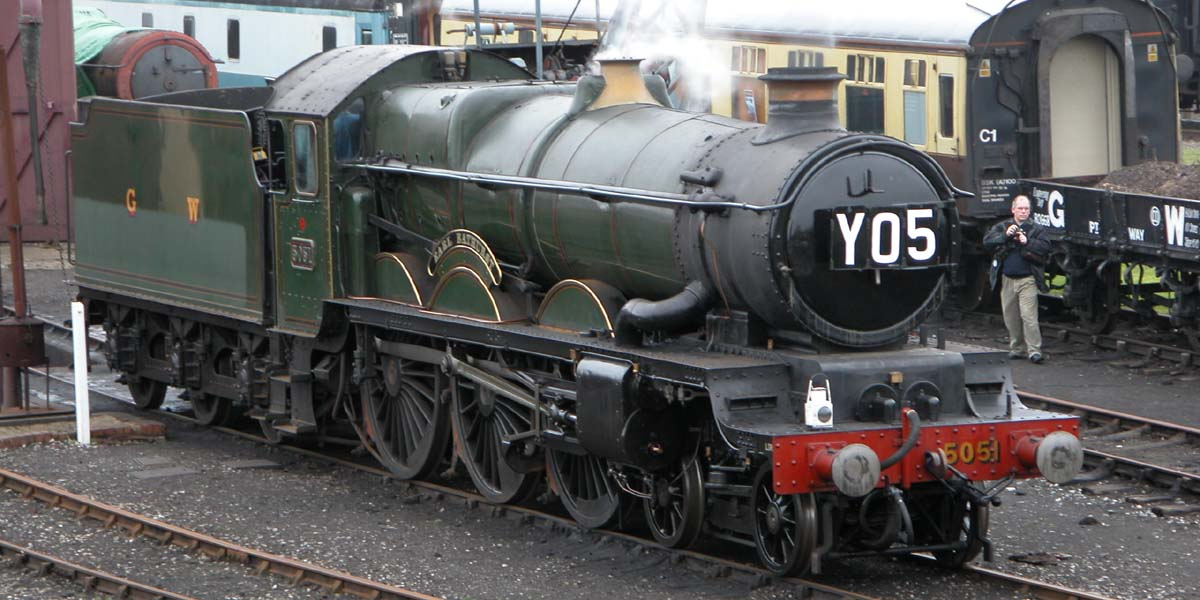
British GWR Castle Class locomotive Earl Bathurst. The Belpaire firebox is the square shape in front of the cab.

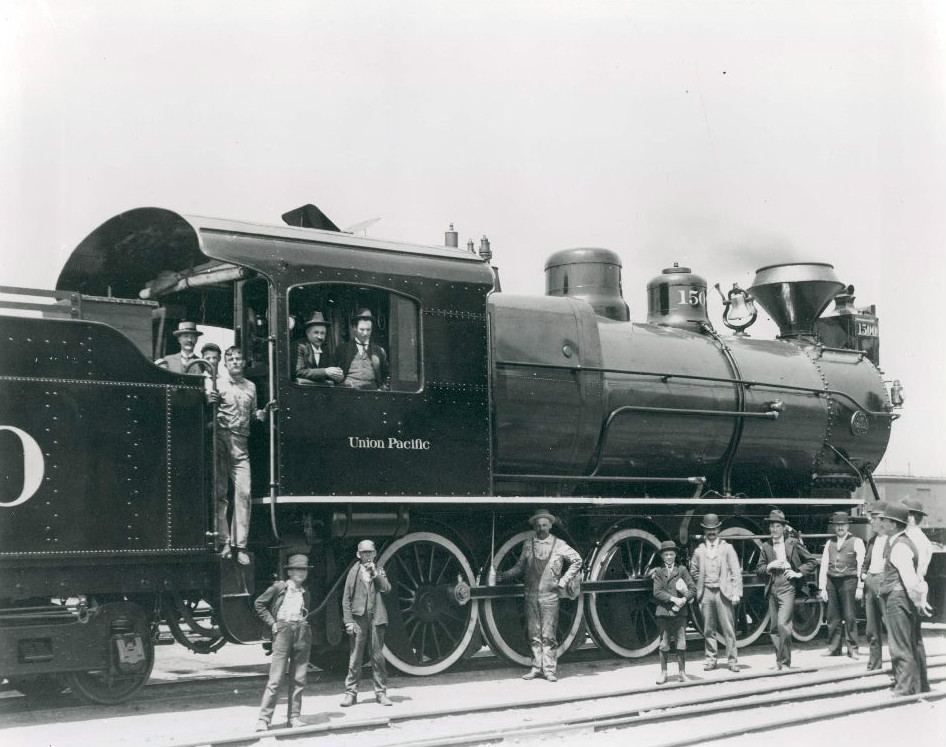
American Union Pacific steam locomotive #1500, showing the square Belpaire firebox.

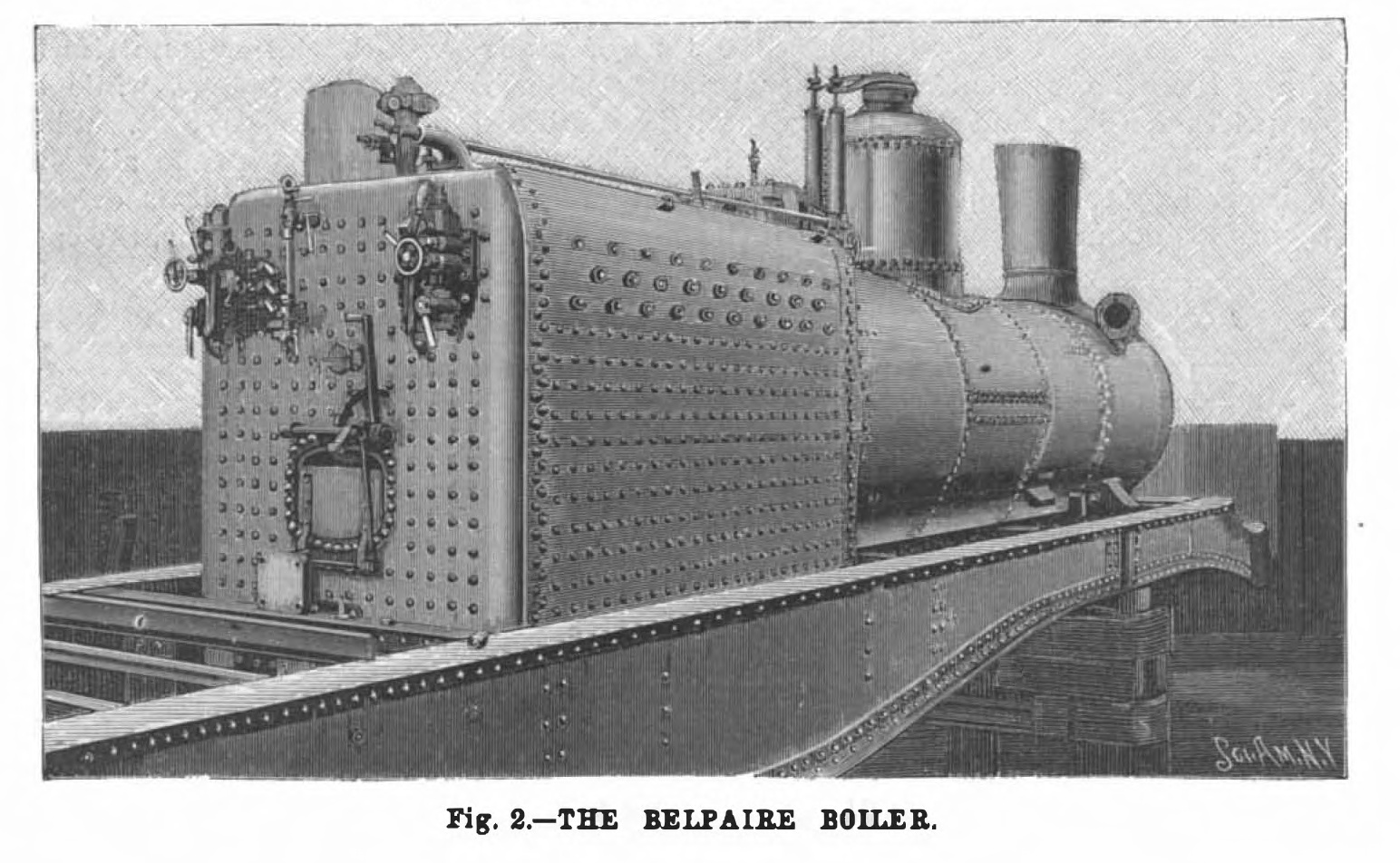
Belpaire firebox and boiler illustrated in Scientific American in 1897.

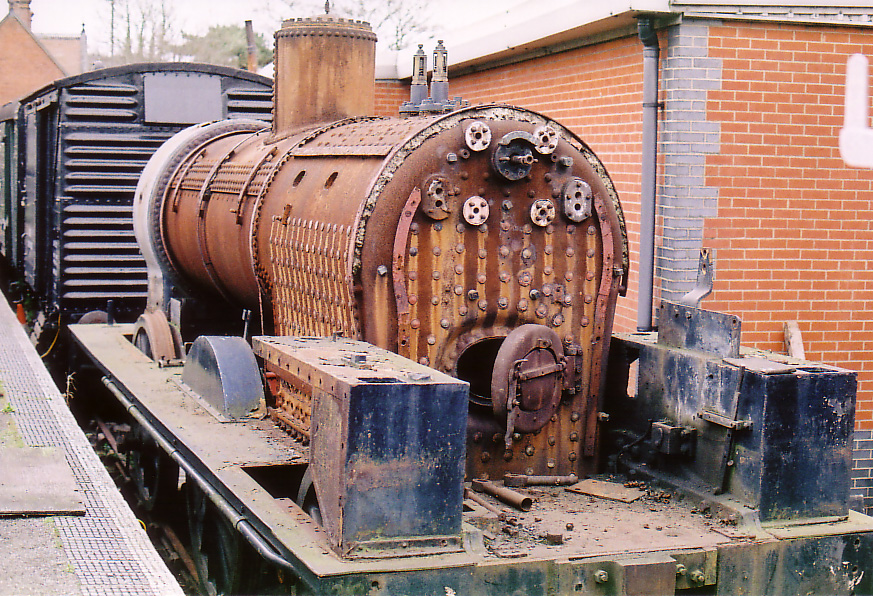
A round top boiler and firebox shown for comparison.

== See also ==
- Wootten firebox
