= Thomas Blackwell =

Thomas or Tom Blackwell may refer to:

- Thomas Blackwell (principal) (1660–1728), principal of Marischal College
- Thomas Blackwell (scholar) (1701–1757), Scottish classical scholar, son of above
- Thomas Evans Blackwell (1819–1863), English civil engineer
- Thomas Blackwell (1804–1879), British co-founder of Crosse & Blackwell
- Tom Blackwell (1938–2020), American photorealist painter
- Thomas W. Blackwell (1958–2017), American politician

== See also ==
- Blackwell (surname)
