= Caen Hill Locks =

Flight of locks on the Kennet and Avon Canal

Coordinates: 51.3526°N 2.0256°W

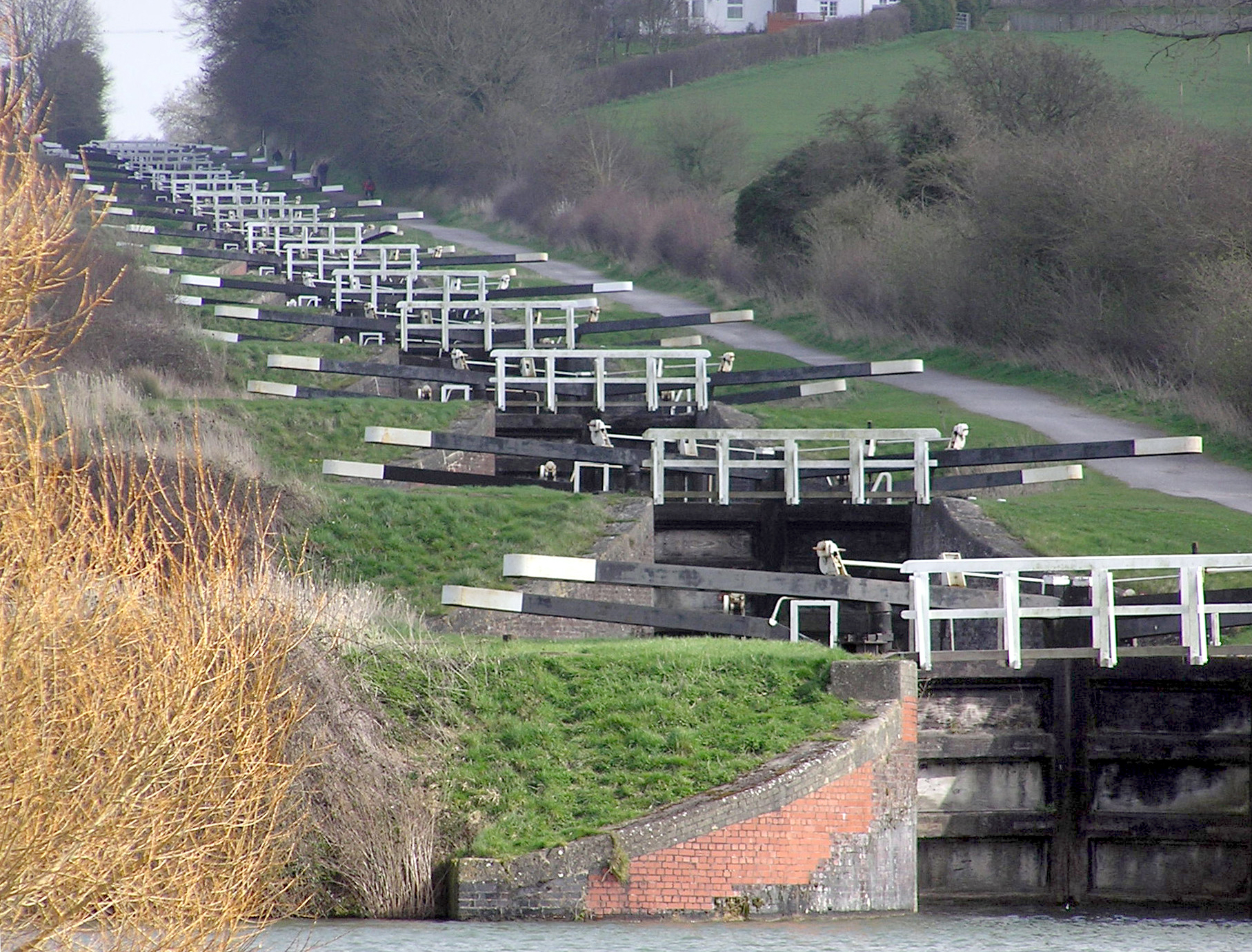
The main flight of 16 locks at Caen Hill on the Kennet and Avon Canal

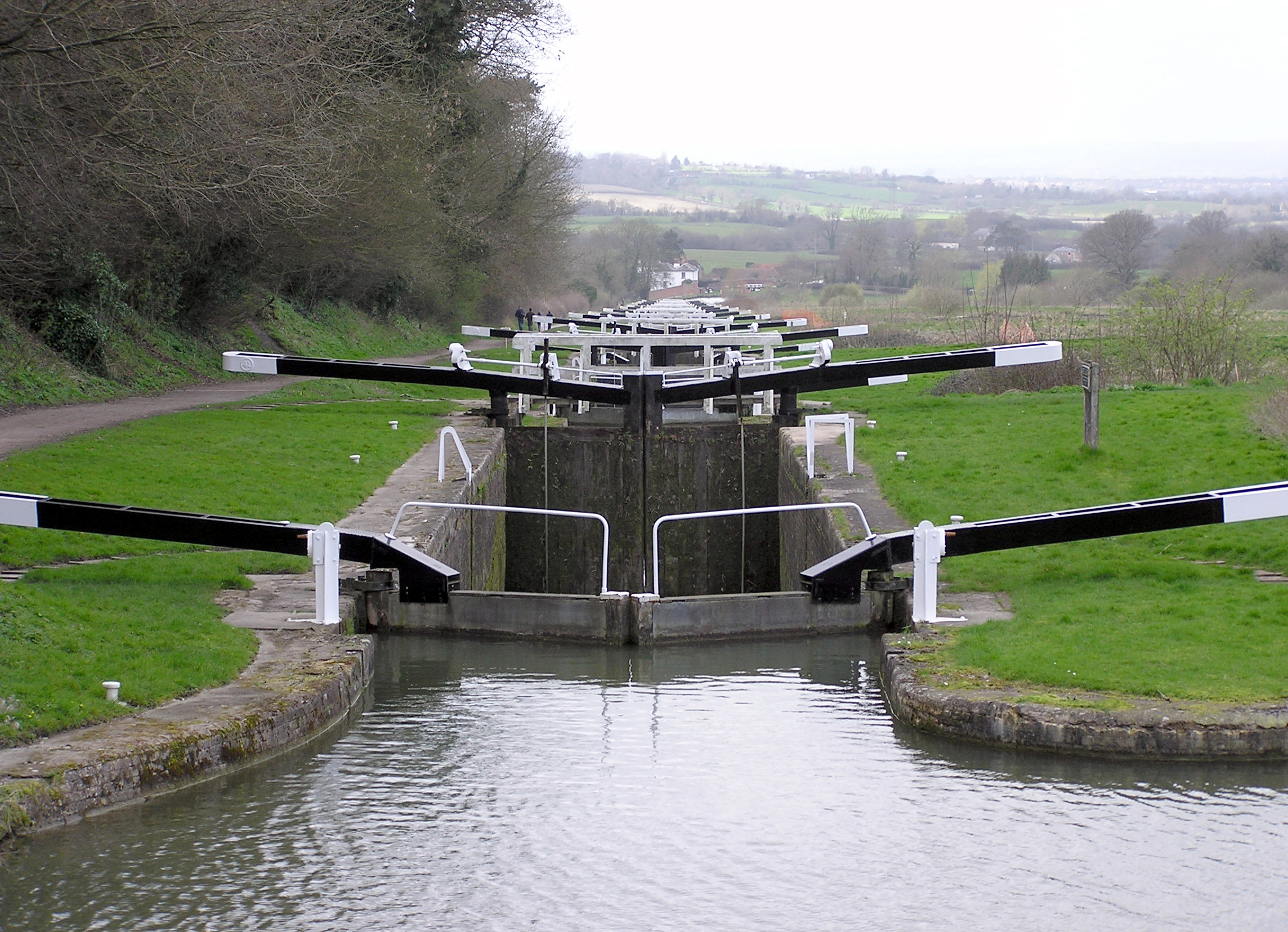
Caen Hill Locks, looking downwards from near the top of the flight

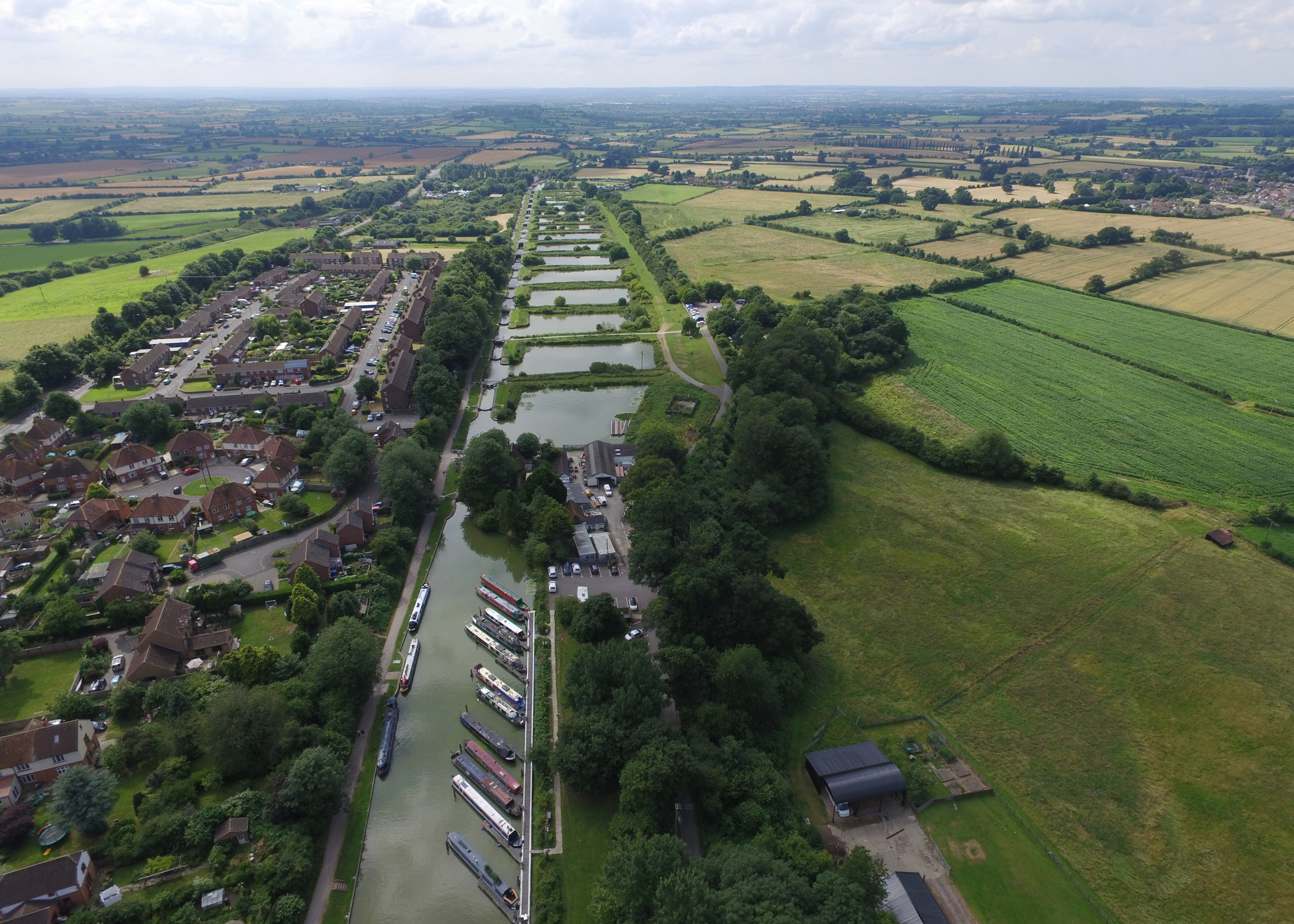
Caen Hill Locks from 400 feet, looking west

Caen Hill Locks (/ˈkeɪn ˈhɪl/) are a flight of 29 locks on the Kennet and Avon Canal, between Rowde and Devizes in Wiltshire, England. Of the 107 locks on the canal, those at Caen Hill are numbered 22 to 50, and they are near the canal highpoint at Cadley Lock (number 54).

== Description ==
The 29 locks have a rise of 237 feet in 2 miles (72 m in 3.2 km) or a 1 in 44 gradient. The locks come in three groups: the lower seven locks (nos 22 to 28), from Foxhangers Wharf to Upper Foxhangers Bridge, are spread over 3/4 mile (1.2 km); the next sixteen locks (nos 29 to 44) form a steep flight in a straight line up the hillside and are designated as a scheduled monument and are also known as one of the Seven Wonders of the Waterways. Because of the steepness of the terrain, the pounds between these locks are very short. As a result, fifteen of them have unusually large sideways-extended pounds, to store the water needed to operate them. A final six locks (nos 45 to 50) take the canal into Devizes. The locks take 5–6 hours to traverse in a boat.

The side pounds, the areas around them and adjoining fields to the north, are managed as nature habitat by the Canal & River Trust. Over 30,000 trees were planted in 2012–13 to mark the Diamond Jubilee of Elizabeth II.

== History ==
This flight was John Rennie the Elder's solution to climbing a steep hill and, in 1810, was the last part of the 87-mile (140 km) route of the Kennet and Avon navigation, commenced in 1796, between Bristol and Reading, to be opened. A brickyard had been established to the south of the site for the manufacture of bricks for the lock chambers. This remained in viable commercial use until the middle of the 20th century. John Blackwell oversaw the locks' construction as Rennie's site agent. Between 1801 and 1810, a tramway had provided a trade link between Foxhangers at the bottom and Devizes at the top, the remains of which can be seen in the towpath arches of the road bridges over the canal.

In the early 19th century, between 1829 and 1843, the flight was lit by gas lights.

After the coming of the railways, the canal fell into disuse and was closed. The last cargo through the flight was a consignment of grain conveyed from Avonmouth to Newbury in October 1948. From the 1960s there was a major clearing and rebuilding operation, culminating in a visit by Elizabeth II in 1990 to open the new locks officially, although the flight had been navigable for a number of years before then.

Because a large volume of water is needed for the locks to operate, a back pump was installed at Foxhangers in 1996 capable of returning 7 million imperial gallons (32 million litres; 8.4 million US gallons) of water per day to the top of the flight, which is equivalent to one lockful every eleven minutes.

In 2010 British Waterways planned to install sixteen new lock gates in twelve weeks as part of its winter maintenance programme, in an attempt to reduce the amount of water lost. The exceptionally cold weather delayed work, and when the section was re-opened at Easter 2010 only twelve pairs of gates had been dealt with. The wood from the old gates was donated to Glastonbury Festival and used to build a new bridge which was named in honour of Arabella Churchill, one of the festival's founders.

== Lock names ==
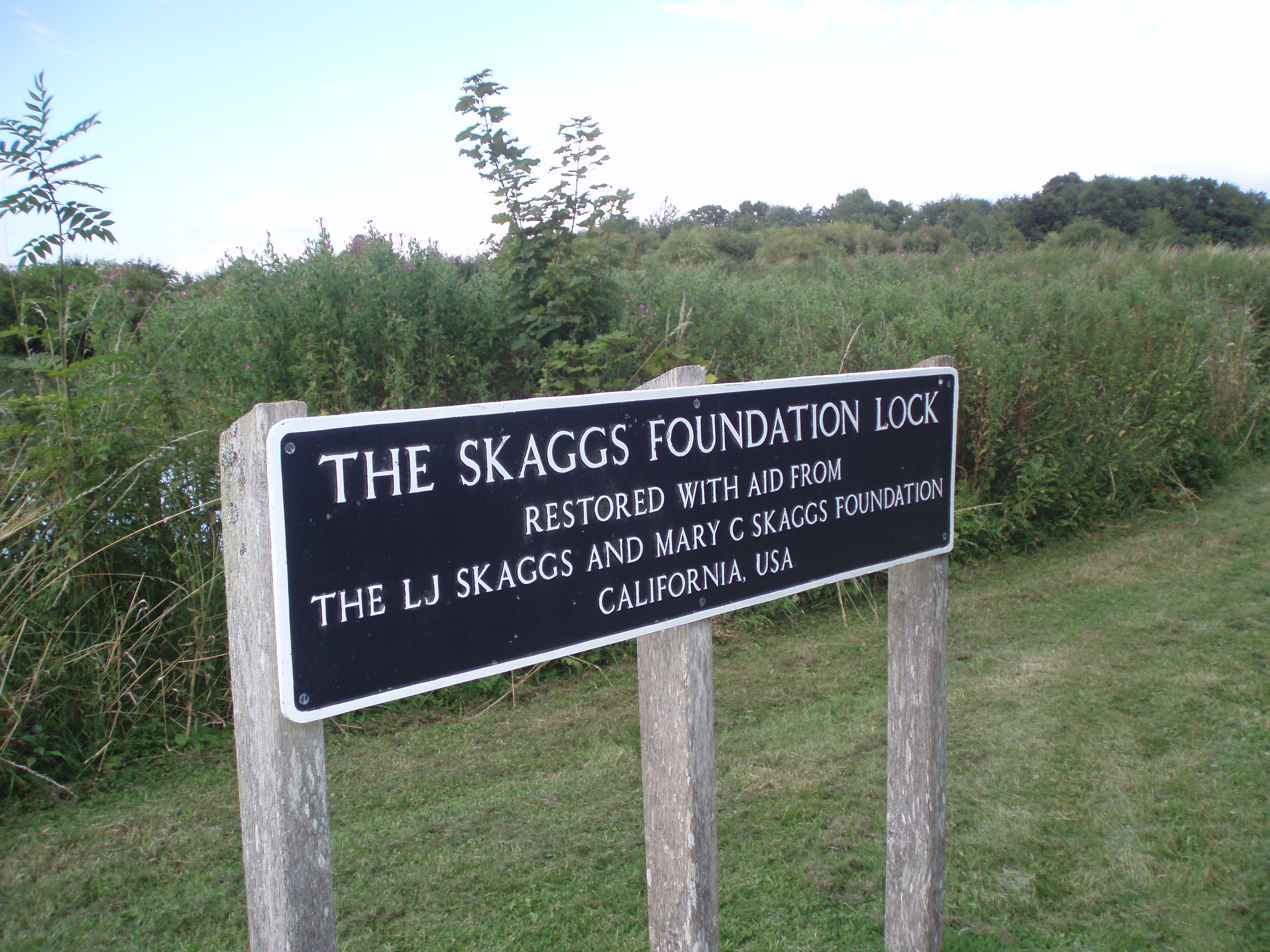
Plaque at lock 39, "Skaggs Foundation Lock"

A few locks at either end are named after topographic features. More have been named after benefactors, beginning in 1984 with locks 44 to 48. Those named include number 22 (Lower Foxhangers), 23 (Foxhangers), 27 (Marsh Lane), 28 (Moonrake), 29 (Youth Division), 30 (Fundraisers'), 33 (Lloyds), 36 (Peter Lindley-Jones), 38 (Jack Dalby), 39 (Skaggs Foundation), 40 (Paul Ensor) 41 (Boto-X), 42 (Monument), 43 (Queen Elizabeth II), 44 (Sir Hugh Stockwell), 45 (Cave), 46 (A. P. Herbert), 47 (Manifold), 48 (Trust), 49 (Maton), and 50 (Kennet).

== Restoration ==
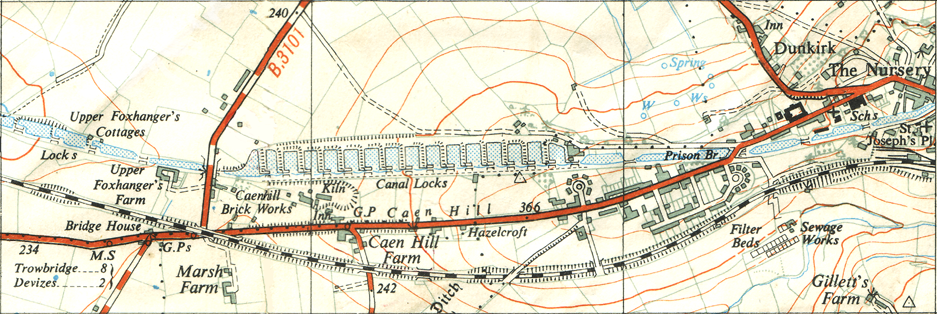
Plan from 1949, when still completely watered (Contour lines at 25 feet)

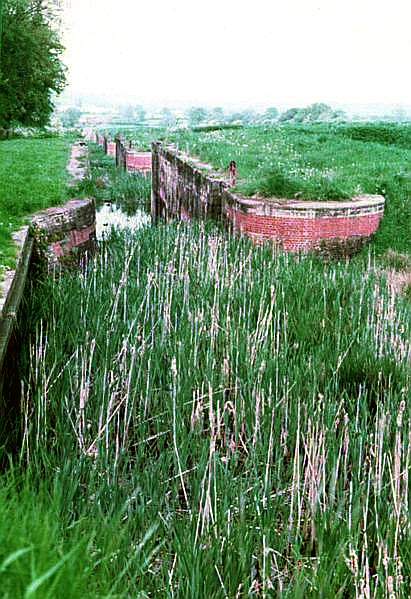
Before any restoration, early 1970s

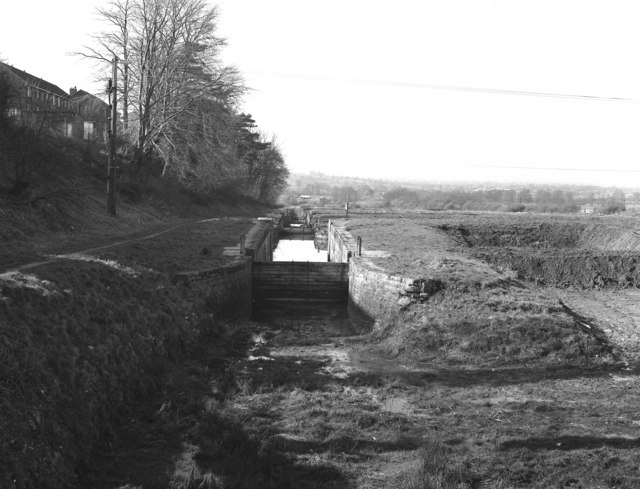
1977, looking west
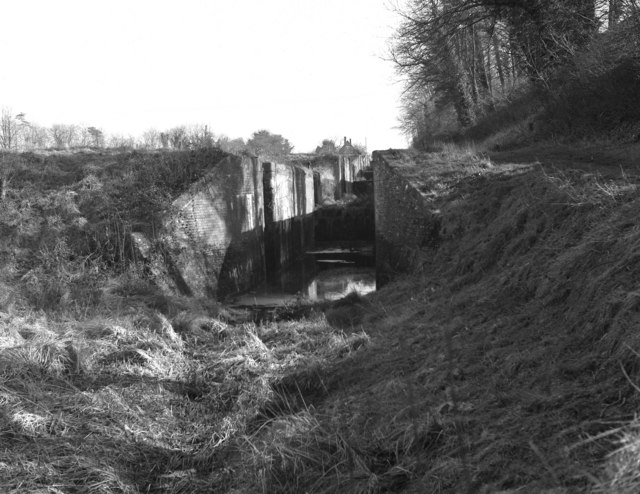
1977, looking uphill

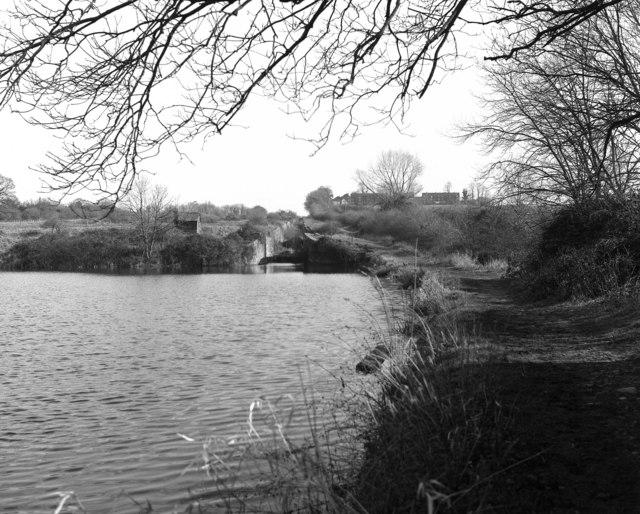
1977, from the bottom

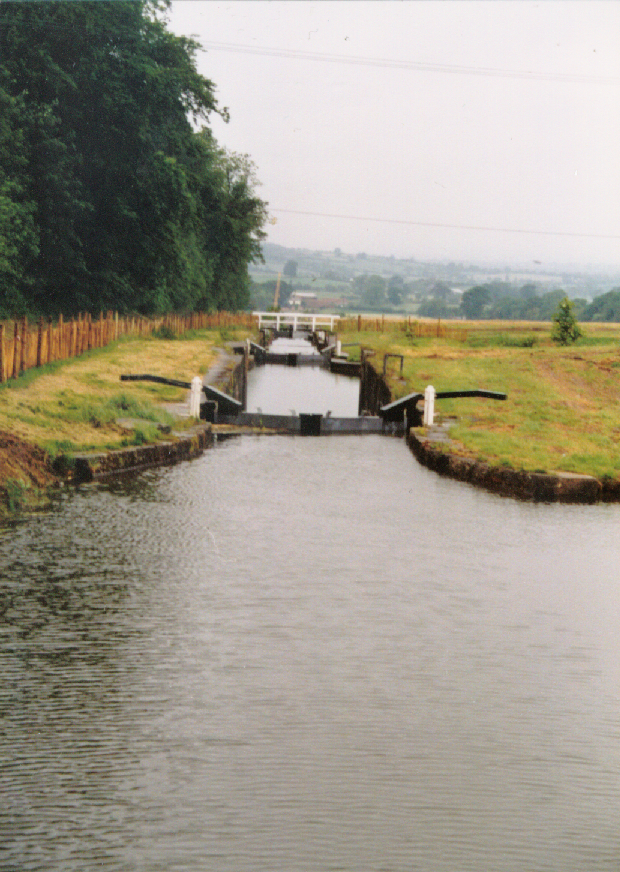
1985 — rewatered

== See also ==
Next lock upstream	Kennet and Avon Canal	Next lock downstream
Wootton Rivers Bottom Lock	Caen Hill Locks; Grid reference: ST978614	Seend Locks
