= William Henry Napier =

Canadian artist (1829–1894)

- Born: William Henry Edward Napier; 29 September 1829; Montreal, Lower Canada
- Died: 2 August 1894 (aged 64); Edinburgh, Scotland
- Education: trained as a civil engineer by brothers Walter and Frank Shanly, with whom he worked in the 1850s
- Known for: artist, engineer
- Spouse: Annie W. Robertson (m. 1870)

William Henry Edward Napier (29 September 1829 – 2 August 1894) was a Canadian artist, photographer and engineer. His medium as an artist was watercolour.

== Biography ==
Napier was born in Montreal, Canada. His father was personal secretary to Lord Elgin and secretary of the Indian Department, Lower Canada. His training as an artist is unknown. His watercolours seem to have been done occasionally, in places in which he lived or visited. An obituary says that he was "very quick in making himself acquainted with the topography of a country".

He was trained as a civil engineer by the brothers Walter and Frank Shanly in Montreal, with whom he worked in the 1850s. From 1857 to 1858, he qualified as a professional land surveyor and accompanied the Canadian Government's Red River expedition to present-day Northwestern Ontario and Manitoba. Many of the watercolours he painted during this period were preserved by Thomas Evans Blackwell, Manager of the Grand Trunk Railway and are in Library and Archives Canada, Ottawa.

Napier seems to have lived in Canada East (now Quebec) from 1858 onwards. He was the resident engineer for the Grand Trunk Railway (1860–1863). In August 1863, he made a watercolour sketch at Shawinigan Falls, Quebec, carefully recording the people who were with him and a dog named "Rags" in pencil on the sketch (now in the Royal Ontario Museum collection). That summer he also painted a scene in Tadoussac (now in the collection of the McCord Stewart Museum).

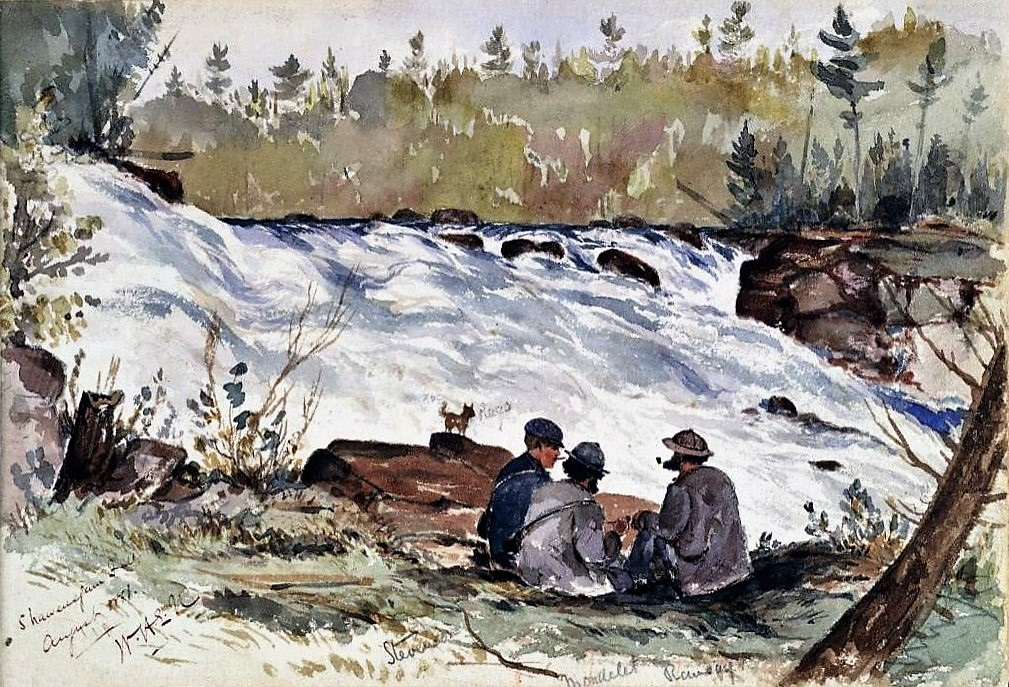
Three Men and a Dog at Shawinigan Falls

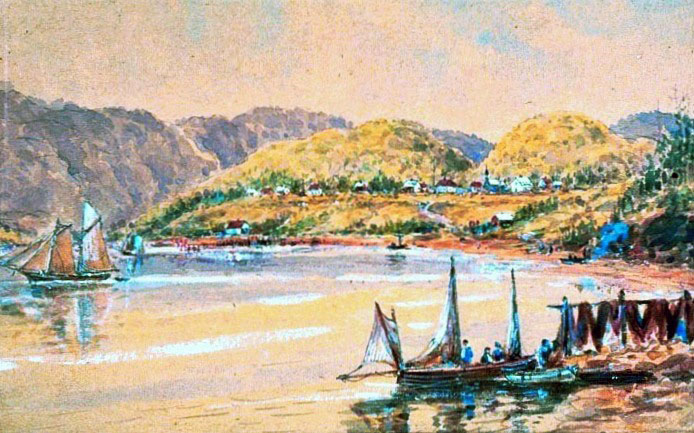
Napier Summer Scene in Tadoussac (1863)

After Quebec, he worked on engineering projects in Europe (1864–1866) (his obituary mentions East Prussia). He returned to Canada to work for the Intercolonial Railway and in 1868, was elected a member of the Institution of Civil Engineers. In 1870, he gave up work as an engineer and left Canada for Scotland. He lived in London and died of apoplexy in Edinburgh on 2 August 1894.

There is a William Henry Edward Napier fonds [graphic material] in Library and Archives Canada. His work is also in the Royal Ontario Museum collection, the McCord Stewart Museum and National Library of New Zealand. A photograph of him by William Notman is in Musée national des beaux-arts du Québec.

== Record sale prices ==
At the Cowley Abbott Auction Artwork from an Important Private Collection - Part II, June 8, 2023, Sleigh Riding, Montmorency Falls, oil on canvas, 18 x 14 ins (45.7 x 35.6 cms), Auction Estimate: $3,000–$5,000, realized a price of $38,400.
