= Purple Funk =

2017 single by Mothers Favorite Child, featuring CeCe Peniston

Single by Mothers Favorite Child featuring CeCe Peniston
- B-side: "Wish"; remix
- Released: June 22, 2017 (Reel People remixes)
- Length: 4:01 (radio edit)
- Label: MFC/Paris Toon; Reel People
- Producer: Paris Toon

CeCe Peniston singles chronology
"Piece of That" (2016)	"Purple Funk" (2017)	"Reflections of a Disco Ball" (2017)

"Purple Funk" is a 2017 song by Mothers Favorite Child featuring singer CeCe Peniston, released as a music download, as well on CD single, distributed through the band's own label MFC in association with Reel People Music on June 22, 2017.

== Track listing and format ==
MD, #RPM066

1. "Purple Funk" – 6:10
2. "Purple Funk" (Reel People Remix) – 7:19
3. "Purple Funk" (Reel People Dub) – 6:24
4. "Purple Funk" (Reel People Instrumental Remix) – 7:19

MD, AAC

1. "Purple Funk" (Radio Edit) – 4:01
2. "Purple Funk" (Blackwell Extended Mix) – 6:05
3. "Purple Funk" (Instrumental) – 6:07
4. "Wish" (Kat Dyson Mix) – 3:17

CDS

1. "Purple Funk" (Radio Edit) – 4:01
2. "Purple Funk" (Blackwell Extended Mix) – 6:05
3. "Purple Funk" (Instrumental) – 6:07
4. "Wish" (Kat Dyson Mix) – 3:17
5. "Wish" (Desert Rock Mix) – 3:26^{┼}

Note: ^{┼} denotes a hidden track

== Credits and personnel ==
- Paris Toon – co-writer, programmer, engineer, producer
- Cecilia Peniston – lead vocals, co-writer ("Purple Funk"), producer
- Whitney Jones – back vocals, co-writer ("Purple Funk")
- Eloni Yawn – back vocals, co-writer ("Wish")
- Richard Simpson – co-writer/rap (Blackwell Extended Mix)
- Maurice Joshua – co-writer ("Purple Funk"), programmer
- Ted Belledin – co-writer ("Wish"), programmer
- Roger Dryer – bass guitar
- Dan Petrosino – drums
- John Blackwell – drums, remix ("Purple Funk")
- Kent Phillips – engineer
- Kathleen Dyson – guitar, remix ("Wish")
- Kolton Lee – guitar
- Tyrone Chase – guitar
- JWhite – horns
- Tenth Month – programmer
- Desert Rock – remix ("Wish")
- Mike Patto (as Reel People) – remix ("Purple Funk")
- Oli Lazarus (as Reel People) – remix ("Purple Funk")
- Tom Davidson (as Reel People) – remix ("Purple Funk")

== Charts ==
Chart (2017)	Peak position
US Billboard Hot Singles Sales	2
