= Charles Blackwell (engineer) =

English civil engineer

Charles Blackwell AMICE
- Born: 4 February 1843; Devizes, Wiltshire, England
- Died: 29 December 1906 (aged 63); Cincinnati, Ohio, United States
- Spouse: Emily Chandler (married 1878)
- Parent(s): Thomas Evans Blackwell, Ann Buckland
- Engineering career
- Discipline: Civil engineering
- Institutions: Institution of Civil Engineers, American Society of Civil Engineers

Charles Blackwell AMICE (4 February 1843 – 29 December 1906) was an English civil engineer, primarily known for his railway engineering work in Canada and the United States. He came from a family of engineers; his father was Thomas Evans Blackwell and his grandfather was John Blackwell.

== Early life ==
Blackwell was born at Foxhangers near Devizes, Wiltshire, on 4 February 1843. He emigrated to Canada in 1857 with his family when his father, Thomas Evans Blackwell, began employment as vice president of the Grand Trunk Railroad.

Blackwell was educated at the High School of Montreal and later at McGill College.

== Career ==
Blackwell's first employment was with the Grand Trunk Railroad under his father. He worked for the Intercolonial Railway between 1869 and 1876, supervising the company's repair shops in Moncton, New Brunswick. From 1876 he took a year's employment as resident engineer on the Quebec, Montreal, Ottawa and Occidental Railway, before taking the same role at the Quebec Central Railway until 1879. Blackwell next followed in his father and grandfather's footsteps by taking a role involving canals. He was employed by the Department of Railways and Canals where he worked with the Canadian Pacific Railway as well as the navigable inland waterways.

Blackwell later moved to Roanoke, Virginia to superintend on the Norfolk and Western and Shenandoah Valley Railroads. From 1885 he managed the Montana division of the Union Pacific Railroad and later had engineering roles with the Central of Georgia Railway and the Toledo, St. Louis and Kansas City Railroad.

In 1891 he worked for the Schoenberger Steel Company in Pittsburgh, but returned to railway engineering in 1897 to work with the receivers of the failing Wheeling and Lake Erie Railroad. Blackwell's final role began in 1903, when he was employed as special assistant to the chief engineer at the Wabash Railroad. His work here was described as "accurate, methodical and resourceful".

In 1874, Blackwell was elected an associate member of the Institution of Civil Engineers; both his father and grandfather had been members of the institution. In 1881 he was elected as a member of the American Society of Civil Engineers in 1881.

== Personal life ==
Blackwell married Mary Emily Margaret Chandler, known as Emily, in 1878. Chandler was the granddaughter of Edward Barron Chandler, lieutenant governor of New Brunswick. They had three sons: Thomas Edward (b. 1875), Hubert Charles (b. 1878) and John Buckland (b. 1882).

Blackwell died in Cincinnati, Ohio, on 29 December 1906.
