= Alfred Belpaire =

Belgian locomotive engineer

Alfred J. Belpaire
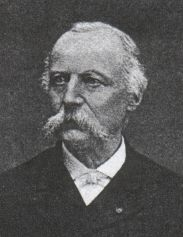
- Born: Alfred Jules Belpaire; 25 September 1820; Ostend, United Kingdom of the Netherlands
- Died: 27 January 1893 (aged 72); Schaerbeek, Belgium
- Education: École Centrale Paris
- Occupation: locomotive engineer
- Known for: Invented the Belpaire firebox

Alfred Jules Belpaire (25 September 1820 – 27 January 1893) was a Belgian locomotive engineer who invented the square-topped Belpaire firebox in 1864.

Belpaire was born in Ostend, and first studied at the Athenaeum School in Antwerp. He then became a student at the École Centrale des Arts et Manufactures in Paris, France from 1837 to 1840 where he obtained a degree in mechanical engineering.

Belpaire was then employed at the Belgian State Railways, where he worked as a mechanical engineer for more than 50 years. He was first director of the railway workshops at Mechelen and then from 1850 put in charge of all materials and based in Brussels. He first developed a firebox to burn poor quality coals and then around 1860 generalised his invention into a robust thermally efficient design which bears his name. His firebox was used in locomotives in his native Belgium and also then extensively in Britain, North America and around the world. The Belpaire firebox had an improved transfer of heat and steam production due to its greater surface area at the top. While attaching it to a boiler was more difficult due to its oblong shape, it had simpler interior bracing as an advantage.

Alfred Belpaire was one of the founders of the Congrès International des Chemins de Fer, of which he was president in 1891.

He died in Schaerbeek, aged 72.

== Honours ==
- Grand Officier in the Order of Leopold.
- Grand Officier in the Legion of Honour.
- Knight grand Cross in the Order of Saint Stanislaus.
- Knight Commander in the Order of Charles III.
- Officier in the Order of the Oak Crown.
