= Cadley Lock =

Canal lock in Wiltshire, England

Coordinates: 51.36927°N 1.69685°W

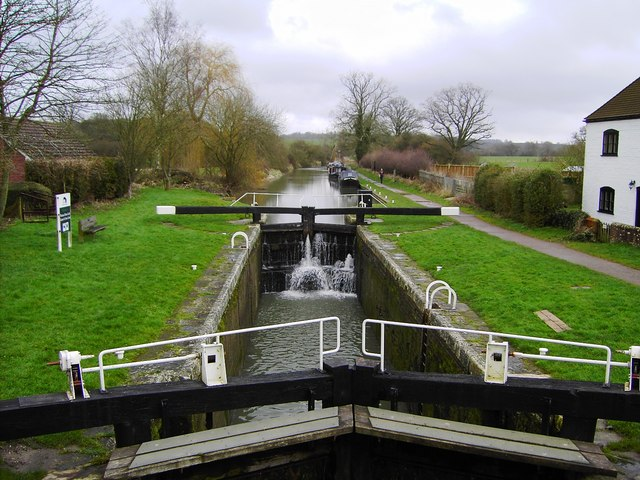
Wootton Top Lock

Wootton Top Lock (previously known as Cadley Lock) is a lock on the Kennet and Avon Canal at Wootton Rivers, Wiltshire, England, built c. 1810. The lock has a rise/fall of 8 ft 0 in (2.43 m). The lock and bridge are Grade II listed structures.

East of this lock is the summit of the canal, at 450 ft (137 m) above sea level. Downstream in the same parish are the locks of Brimslade, Heathy Close, and Wootton Rivers Bottom.

== See also ==
- List of locks on the Kennet and Avon Canal

Next lock upstream	Kennet and Avon Canal	Next lock downstream
Crofton Locks	Cadley Lock; Grid reference: SU212634	Brimslade Lock
