= Snow Point, California =

Snow Point
- Former settlement
- Location in California
- Coordinates: 39°25′37″N 120°48′56″W
- Country: United States
- State: California
- County: Nevada County
- Elevation: 4,321 ft (1,317 m)

Snow Point was a historic mining town in Nevada County, California, on the San Juan Ridge about 2 miles east of Moores Flat and about 6 miles west of Graniteville. It was located at an elevation of 4321 ft just off present day German Bar Road about midway between that road's intersections with present day Moore's Flat Road and Hagerty Road.

== Early history ==
Snow Point was founded in 1853. It owes its existence to its location at the point where the fabled Blue Lead bed of gold-bearing gravel crosses the Middle Yuba River from Sierra County and then heads in a south westerly direction down the San Juan Ridge to French Corral, California. It was "believed to be the most extensive and richest deposit of auriferous gravel in the United States, if not in the world."

Reports of mining at Snow Point begin in 1853. That year, Edwin McCabe, who later claimed to be the first white child born in Nevada County, was born in Snow Point. An electoral district was created there for the 1853 gubernatorial election. In 1855, the town was described as follows: "Snow Point was never more lively than at present. New buildings are constantly going up, among which is one newly completed by our old friend J. M. Hunter, Esq., which is intended for a billiard saloon and would do credit even to Nevada, with all her improvements. There are also two stores, well filled; two hotels, with agreeable landlords and ladies and a fine bakery under way, in connection with H. Devendorff & Co.’s store."

Its heyday was in the 1850s. In addition to the businesses mentioned above, it had two sawmills. Its social life included balls, foot races and visiting minstrel shows. It was connected by stage to Nevada City, Downieville and Eureka (later Graniteville). In the 1860s, the newspaper reports about the town peter out. By then, Moore's Flat had become the commercial and social center of that part of the Ridge. Snow Point never had a post office or a school, but Moore's Flat did. But mining continued to prosper. In 1882, one paper commented: "Moore's Flat would be a "dead town" were it not for the Snow Point mine."

== Mining ==
Mining was king in Snow Point. In 1858, it declared itself to be the hub of Phoenix Hill Mining District and promulgated a set of mining laws. Because of its location on the Blue Lead, all types of mining flourished. There were regular reports of large gold nuggets. There were a number of successful hydraulic gravel mines, such as Blackwell & Co and the Conger Bros. Hydraulic mining required lots of water. Initially water was scarce and seasonal, but that changed with the arrival of ditches, especially the Miners' Ditch in late 1855, later incorporated into the Eureka Lake Company's system of ditches.

There was successful hard rock or quartz mining, though quartz mining was initially hampered by a lack of local mills to crush the ore. In one day in 1855, 4 members of Walton & Co, took out $10,000 (~$265,847 in 2024) in "clean gold" from a quartz vein. From the famous Fellows quartz strike, $108,000 in gold was taken. And there was drift mining, especially where water was not conveniently available.

Contemporary reports all commented on the richness of the Snow Point mines. Around Snow Point, "the old river bed is rich in gold and has been, so far, comparatively untouched." Another observed that around Snow Point is "the richest field of gravel in the world."

After the 1884 Sawyer decision restricted much hydraulic mining, drift and quartz mining became even more important. One observer predicted in 1885, "that Moore's Flat and Snow Point will before long become important quartz mining camps."

== In the 20th century ==
While the town seems to have withered away, mining continued well into the 20th century. The principal mines were the Snow Point mine and the Twin Sisters mine, both managed by George Hegarty, initially on behalf of Hearst family interests and later on behalf of other investors from the San Francisco Bay Area. There was a mining revival around 1950, but references to mining at Snow Point disappear after that. There is some scattered mining that continues. Presently there is no readily visible evidence of the town or its mines, except for some scarred land. '
