= Henry Blackwell =

Henry or Harry Blackwell may refer to:

- Henry Browne Blackwell (1825–1909), American advocate for social and economic reform
- Henry Blackwell (cricketer) (1876–1900), English cricketer
- Harry Blackwell (1900–1956), English footballer

== See also ==
- Blackwell (surname)
