= Pam Blackwell =

American dramatist

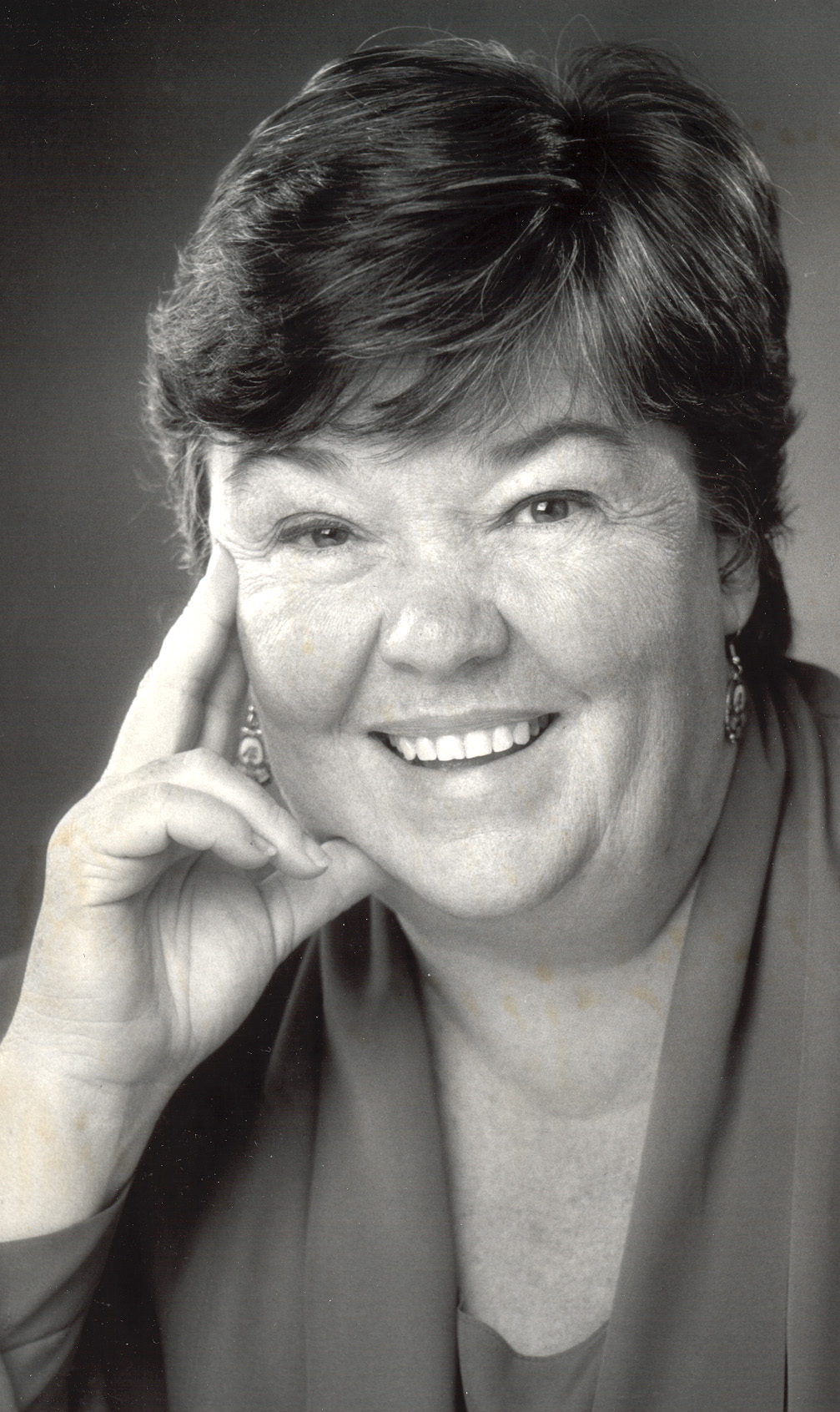
- Born: November 9, 1942 (age 83)
- Other name: Blackwell Mayes
- Education: California Southern University
- Occupations: Educator; theorist; playwright; novelist

Pam Blackwell (born November 9, 1942) is an American Jungian educator and theorist, as well as a playwright and novelist. She has been a meditation teacher since 1961 and directs "Morningstar Institute".

A recipient of a National Endowment for the Arts Fellowship in 1985, her first novel, Ephraim's Seed, was published in 1995. It was the first of a projected four-novel series. The following two novels in the series were Jacob's Cauldron (1998) and Michael's Fire (2002). These first three novels are set in the 21st century before Christ's second coming. The concluding novel was to be titled Enoch's Compass and set in the first 100 years of the Millennium.

In addition to her novels, she wrote Christ-Centered Meditation: A Handbook for Spiritual Practice in 2011. She is a playwright, lyricist and producer of the musical Parley P. Pratt's Great Escape based on the story of Pratt in LDS church history. The music written by Jazz vocalist Kelly Eisenhour.

Blackwell, has a doctorate from the Southern California University for Professional Studies in psychology and has founded The Sacred Hoop Healing Center, which provides support services for Native Americans. Her non-profit corporation, Morning Star Projects, provides assistance to the Northern Cheyenne nation. She is also the Director of Western Sandplay Associates. She has authored theoretical and practical articles in Jungian psychology as well as Jungian sand play therapy in such journals as the International Journal of Play Therapy (2006, vol. 15, no. 1, pp. 101–117) and Psychological Perspectives (2005, vol. 48, pp. 84–107).

== Selected works ==
- Christ-Centered Meditation: A Handbook for Spiritual Practice (2011)

=== Series ===
- Millennial series

- Ephraim's seed (ca. 1996)
- Jacob's Cauldron (1998)
- Michael's Fire (2002)

=== Plays ===
- Parley P. Pratt's Great Escape (2005)
