= Thomas Evans Blackwell =

English civil engineer (1819–1863)

Thomas Evans Blackwell MICE FGS
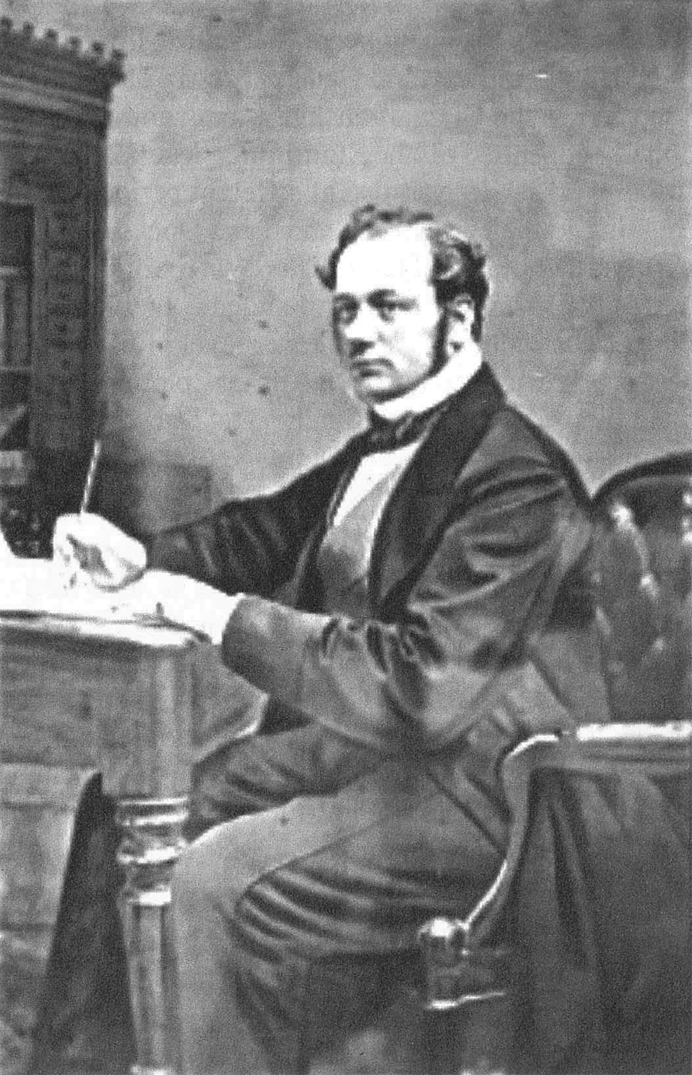
- Blackwell pictured in 1861
- Born: 28 July 1819; Devizes, Wiltshire, England
- Died: 25 June 1863 (aged 43); Pimlico, London, United Kingdom
- Resting place: West Norwood Cemetery, London, United Kingdom
- Spouse: Ann Buckland (married 1840)
- Children: 10 (including Charles Blackwell)
- Parent(s): John Blackwell, Frances Cooper
- Engineering career
- Discipline: Civil engineering
- Institutions: Institution of Civil Engineers
- Employers: Kennet and Avon Canal Company, Port of Bristol, Grand Trunk Railway
- Projects: Kennet and Avon Canal

Thomas Evans Blackwell MICE FGS (28 July 1819 – 25 June 1863) was an English civil engineer.

== Life and career ==
Born in Devizes, Wiltshire, Blackwell was the only son of John Blackwell and Frances Cooper. He was baptised at the Church of St Mary the Virgin, Devizes on 1 October 1819.

Blackwell was educated in mathematics by his godfather, Thomas Evans, who was vicar in Froxfield, Wiltshire. In c. 1836, at the age of 17, Blackwell was employed as an apprentice to the Kennet and Avon Canal Company, a position arranged by his father who had been the company's superintending engineer since 1806.

Upon his father's death in 1840, the 21-year-old Blackwell became the company's engineer. One of his first tasks was working with Isambard Kingdom Brunel when the canal was diverted to accommodate a cut for the new Great Western Railway (GWR). Described as sagacious, Blackwell foresaw the impact the railway system would have on the transportation industry and the decline of the canal network, and recommended to the Kennet and Avon Canal Company that the line of the waterway should be converted into a railway. In 1845 he prepared the relevant plans to put before Parliament, although the Great Western Railway company strongly opposed competition to their existing Great Western Main Line. GWR successfully avoided the scheme by purchasing the waterway. Blackwell was employed as resident engineer on the Bradford and Bathampton branch of the Wilts, Somerset and Weymouth Railway, but left the role upon the railway's amalgamation with GWR.

Between 1843 and 1844, he was responsible for the canal between Bath and Devizes and oversaw the renovation of Claverton Pumping Station's pumps and waterwheel. Blackwell oversaw similar works to the Boulton and Watt pump at Crofton Pumping Station at the same time. In 1846, Blackwell petitioned Parliament to extend the Great Western Main Line (from its then-terminus at Newbury) to Hungerford; the extension was built and opened the following year. He was later involved with the Severn and Wye Railway and the Lydney Canal, the Glamorganshire Canal, the Stourbridge Canal, and the Market Weighton Canal. He worked on the docks at Birkenhead and the Port of Tyne, as well as waterworks systems in Bristol, Bath, Wolverhampton and Gloucester and similar projects in Reading, Sandgate, Devizes and Harwich. In 1853, he was employed with the Kensington and Brentford Canal Company.

On 12 January 1852, Blackwell took up the role of engineer of the Bristol Docks at a salary of £300 plus allowances. He put forward a proposal for docks at Avonmouth, and worked with James Meadows Rendel to design a railway connecting the docks to the port of Bristol. He also rebuilt Hills Bridge, an 1805 Jessop crossing of the Avon which collapsed after a coke barge collided with a bridge pier—Blackwell's ornamental wrought iron bridge had a 100-foot (30 m) span and was completed in a very short time. Blackwell resigned as the docks' engineer in late 1855, ostensibly due to the role's shift away from traditional engineering towards business matters and the prohibition of supplementary employment. He suggested he take the role of consulting engineer, and proposed a pay cut from £500 to £200 to allow his then-assistant Thomas Howard to be employed as a local engineer. The committee subsequently employed Blackwell as a consultant, albeit without salary, and Howard as resident and superintending engineer—with a £300 salary.

Blackwell developed an improved version of the aneroid barometer; his device was used by James Glaisher (who found it the most accurate aneroid barometer he ever used) and William Froude (who felt it more convenient, portable, and reliable than the normal aneroid barometer).

On 31 December 1856, the Government appointed him one of three commissioners to consider a London sewerage system for the Metropolitan Board of Works. The following year, however, Blackwell moved to Canada to take up office as vice president and general manager of the Grand Trunk Railway and the presidency of the Grand Trunk Western Railroad. He retired in 1862 before returning to England.

In 1863, he was elected as a member to the American Philosophical Society.

== Legacy ==
The Blackwell neighbourhood of Sarnia, Ontario is named after Blackwell. Writing in the 1907 obituary of Blackwell's son Charles, the American Society of Civil Engineers described Thomas as "the first hydraulic engineer in England".

Blackwell preserved watercolour sketches of the Canadian Government's Red River expedition to present-day Northwestern Ontario and Manitoba by William Henry Napier. They are today in Library and Archives Canada in Napier's fonds.

== Personal life ==
Blackwell married Ann Buckland in September 1840. They had ten children, at least one of whom died in infancy:

1. Fanny Merriman Blackwell (1841–1929; m. Gilbert Girdwood)
2. Charles Blackwell (1843–1906)
3. William Blackwell (1844–1920)
4. John Thomas Blackwell (1844–?)
5. Edward Samuel Blackwell (1847–?)
6. Oke Buckland Blackwell (1849–1849)
7. Kennet William Blackwell (1850–1920)
8. Louis Buckland Blackwell (1852–?)
9. George Blackwell (1853–1925)
10. Helen Canadia Mary Louisa Blackwell (1858–1939)

In the 1851 census, the family were living at 65 Great Pulteney Street in Bath, although Thomas was not listed as being present. In 1857 the family emigrated to Canada; their final child (Helen) was born there. The 1861 Canada East census lists the family as residing in a three-storey stone house in Saint-Laurent, Montreal, Canada. Between 1858 and 1862, the family resided at 51 Sherbrooke Street West in the city. Blackwell sent two of his sons—John and Edward—to Rugby School. They enrolled in 1860 and 1861 respectively.

After Blackwell retired due to ill health in 1862, he toured the United States before returning to England. He subsequently visited Egypt and the Nile, returning home via Rome and Naples. He was bed ridden the day after returning.

Blackwell died of "chronic inflammation of the membranes of the spinal cord" on 25 June 1863 while living in Warwick Square, Pimlico. He was buried in West Norwood Cemetery. A memorial plaque to Blackwell and his father is in the church at Hungerford, Berkshire, where his parents are buried. It reads:

IN MEMORY OF THOMAS EVANS BLACKWELL, ESQ. C.E. SON OF JOHN AND FANNY BLACKWELL. LATE OF CLIFTON, AND OF MONTREAL, CANADA, WHO DIED IN LONDON, JUNE 25TH 1863, AGED 43 YEARS, AND WAS INTERRED IN THE CEMETERY AT NORWOOD

A number of Blackwell's children—including Fanny, William, Kennet, and George—remained in Canada after their father's return to Britain. Fanny married Gilbert Girdwood at Christ Church Cathedral in Montreal on 9 April 1862.

== Published works ==
- Blackwell, T.E. (1851). Results of a Series of Experiments on the Discharge of Water by Overfalls, or Weirs. London: Institution of Civil Engineers. doi:10.1680/imotp.1851.24111
- Stephenson, R., Coddington, Murray, J., Blackwell, T.E., Hood, Hawksley, Russell, J.S., Hawkshaw, J., Moorsom, W.S., Locke, J., Radford, W., Brooks, W.S., Rendel, J.M., Rowland (1853). Results of a Series of Experiments on the Discharge of Water by Overfalls, or Weirs. London: Institution of Civil Engineers. doi:10.1680/imotp.1851.24111
- Blackwell, T.E. (1874 (Note: Published posthumously)). Descriptive Statement of the Great Water Highways of the Dominion of Canada: Hydrology of the Basin of the Gulf and River St Lawrence. Montreal: Dawson Brothers. OL 20477324M
