= Kelly Eisenhour =

- Born: Kelly Conelly; April 17, 1960 (age 65); Tucson, Arizona
- Genres: Jazz, vocal jazz
- Occupation: Singer
- Years active: 1980–present
- Labels: Blujazz
- Website: kellyeisenhourmusic.com

Kelly Eisenhour (April 17, 1960, Tucscon, Arizona) is a jazz vocalist.

== Early life and career ==
Eisenhour heard jazz at an early age from listening to her father's record collection. In 1986 she graduated from Berklee School of Music. She performed in Las Vegas shows, then was hired on tour to backup Gladys Knight. As assistant choir director for Knight, she assembled the Saints Unified Choir and recorded with the choir on the album One Voice (1986). In 1997 she moved to Utah and was later guest soloist with the Utah Symphony and the Boston Pops. She has performed at the Salt Lake City Jazz Festival and has taught vocal jazz at Brigham Young University.

Her album Seek and Find, which featured Bob Mintzer, went high on the jazz charts. The album includes vocalese treatments of solos by J. J. Johnson and Lester Young.

Eisenhour teaches at Green River College in Auburn, Washington.

== Discography ==
- Now You Know (2000)
- Seek and Find (Blujazz, 2007)
- Invitation (Pony Boy, 2016)
- I Just Found Out About Love (Blujazz, 2020)

== Sources ==
- Official site
