= James Blackwell =

James Blackwell may refer to:

- James Blackwell (basketball) (born 1968), American basketball player
- James Blackwell (educator) (1864–1931), American educator
- James Blackwell (rugby union) (born 1995), New Zealand rugby union player
- James Bartholomew Blackwell (1763–1820), Irish mercenary and French Army officer
- James DeRuyter Blackwell (1828–1901), author and poet of the American Civil War era
