= Heathy Close Lock =

Canal lock in Wiltshire, England

Coordinates: 51.36661°N 1.71267°W

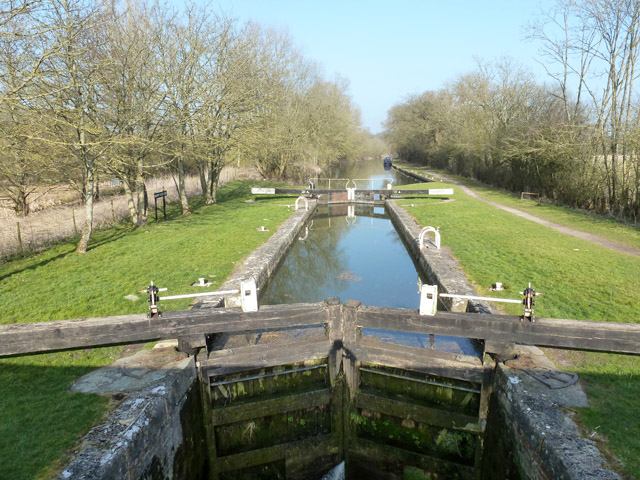
Heathy Close Lock

Heathy Close Lock is a canal lock on the Kennet and Avon Canal, at Wootton Rivers, Wiltshire, England. The lock has a rise/fall of 8 ft 1 in (2.46 m).

== See also ==
- Locks on the Kennet and Avon Canal

Next lock upstream	Kennet and Avon Canal	Next lock downstream
Brimslade Lock	Heathy Close Lock; Grid reference: SU201631	Wootton Rivers (Bottom) Lock
