= W. Blackwell =

English cricketer

Personal information
- Full name: W. Blackwell
- Born: Unknown
- Died: Unknown
- Batting: Left-handed

Career statistics
| Competition | First-class |
|---|---|
| Matches | 1 |
| Runs scored | 0 |
| Batting average | 0.00 |
| 100s/50s | –/– |
| Top score | 0 |
| Balls bowled | – |
| Wickets | – |
| Bowling average | – |
| 5 wickets in innings | – |
| 10 wickets in match | – |
| Best bowling | – |
| Catches/stumpings | –/– |
- Source: Cricinfo, 16 June 2013

W. Blackwell was an English cricketer. Blackwell's batting style is assumed to be left-handed.

Blackwell made a single first-class appearance for the Left-Handed team in the Left-Handed v Right-Handed fixture of 1835 at Lord's Cricket Ground. In a match which the Right-Handed won by an innings and 87 runs, Blackwell was twice dismissed for a duck, firstly by Sam Redgate and secondly by James Cobbett.
