= Gilbert Girdwood =

English surgeon (1832–1917)

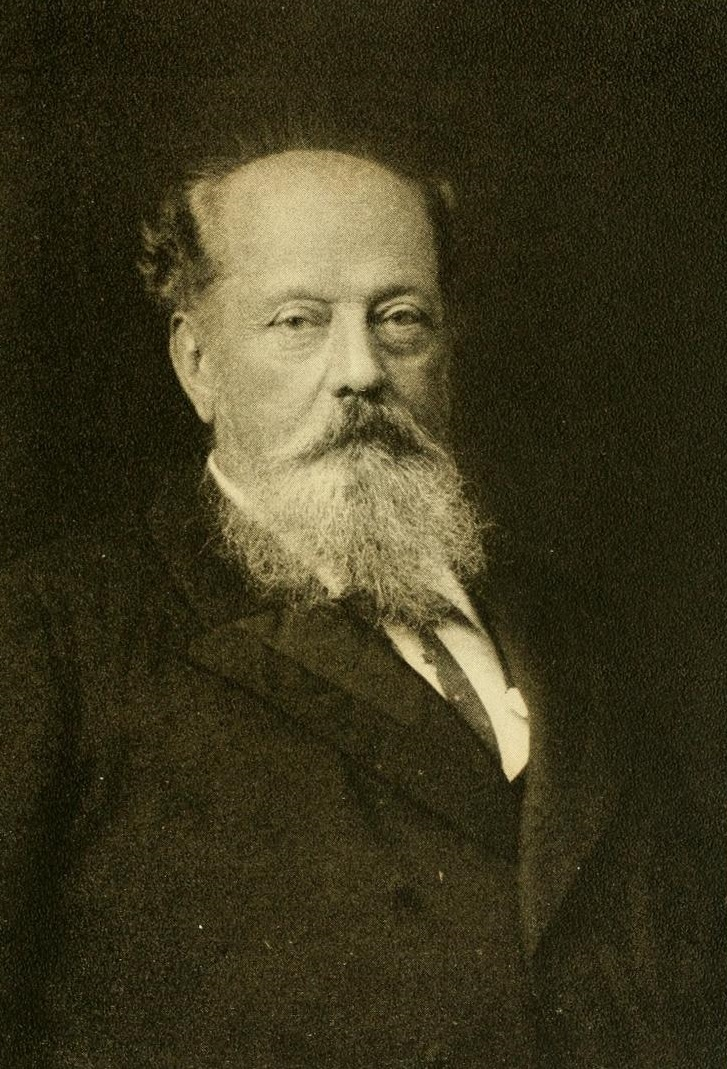
- Born: Gilbert Prout Girdwood; 22 October 1832; Paddington, London
- Died: 2 October 1917 (aged 84); Montreal, Quebec, Canada
- Resting place: Mount Royal Cemetery
- Education: University College London
- Occupation: Civil Servant

Gilbert Prout Girdwood (22 October 1832 – 2 October 1917) was an English army and civilian physician and surgeon, academic and author, noted for his service in the Canadian Army. He was a pioneer in medical education and radiography in Canada.

== Biography ==
Girdwood was born at Paddington, London, the son of Gilbert Finley Girdwood, a physician in general practice and his wife Susan Sophia Bazeley, daughter of Thomas Bazeley, rector of Lavenham, who had been chaplain to Prince Edward Augustus. He was educated privately in London and entered University College London in 1851 and then St George's Hospital Medical School. He studied chemistry in London and Liverpool, and with a London chemist named Rodgers, developed a procedure for detecting strychnine in the human body. He was admitted to the Royal College of Surgeons of England in 1854.

Girdwood began in surgery at the Liverpool Royal Infirmary and on 24 November 1854 joined the army as assistant surgeon in the Grenadier Guards. At the time of the Trent Affair he was sent with his battalion to Canada on 19 December 1861. He returned to England in September 1864 and then left the army in order to settle permanently to Montreal. He practised medicine for several months at the Montreal Dispensary. In 1865, he graduated from McGill College and was appointed surgeon to the military prison in Montreal. In 1866 he helped defend the colony against the Fenian raids as surgeon to the 3rd Battalion of Victoria Volunteer Rifles of Montreal. He was promoted to become medical staff officer in the Canadian militia. In the same year, he was hired as a health officer by the city of Montreal to prevent a cholera epidemic. In April 1869 with Francis Wayland Campbell and Edward H. Trenholme he helped found the Society of the Montreal Hospital for Sick Children and he became consulting physician to the hospital. He also held the post of chief physician for the eastern division of the Canadian Pacific Railway during its construction. He gave private lessons in medical chemistry at his home on Rue de La Gauchetière to medical students from McGill College around 1870. He appreciated the importance of this practical teaching for students. In 1872 he was appointed senior lecturer in practical chemistry the faculty of medicine at McGill College. From 1875, he practised as a surgeon at Montreal General Hospital. In 1879, he was made tenured professor of chemistry at McGill and held the position until 1902 when he then was given the honorary title of emeritus professor.

In 1896, a year after Röntgen's discovery of X-rays, he developed an elementary apparatus which was used to radiograph ten patients at the chemistry laboratory at McGill University. He was a pioneer in the use of stereoscopic photography to study X-ray negatives. In 1901 he agreed to head up the new department of radiology and medical electrology at the Royal Victoria Hospital and had an X-ray apparatus sent from England.

Girdwood was a member of several medical and scientific societies and through his knowledge of toxicology, photography, microscopy, radiology, and forensic medicine became one of the best medico-legal consultants in Canada. In his publications in the Lancet in London, the Montreal Medical Journal, L’Union Médicale du Canada (Montréal), and the Proceedings and Transactions of the Royal Society of Canada he wrote on subjects including cholera, medical chemistry, water filtration, medical photography, and medico-legal expertise.

Girdwood died aged 85 at his home on Rue University, Montreal, after a long illness caused by the years of pioneering the use of X-Rays and was buried two days later in Mount Royal Cemetery.

Girdwood married Fanny Merriman Blackwell, daughter of Thomas Evans Blackwell, a civil engineer on 9 April 1862 at Christ Church Cathedral in Montreal. They had a large family.

== Selected publications ==
- 1867 – Notes on the Habits of Coleopterous Insects.
- 1900 – Stereoscopic Vision.
- 1902 – On Stereomicrography.
