= John Blackwell =

John Blackwell may refer to:

- John Blackwell (Alun) (1797–1840), Welsh poet
- John Blackwell (engineer) (c. 1775–1840), English civil engineer
- John Blackwell (musician) (1973–2017), drummer in the New Power Generation
- John Blackwell (referee), English football referee and soldier
- John Blackwell (basketball) (born 2004), American college basketball player
- Ken Blackwell (John Kenneth Blackwell, born 1948), American politician, author, and conservative activist
