= Harry Ellis Blackwell =

American politician (1908–1984)

Member of the Missouri House of Representatives

Personal details
- Born: December 17, 1908 Springfield, Missouri
- Died: December 30, 1984 (aged 76)
- Party: Democratic
- Spouse: Wanda Lee Bain (m. 1942)
- Children: 1 son
- Occupation: farmer, insurance businessman

Harry Ellis Blackwell (December 17, 1908 – December 30, 1984) was an American politician who served in the Missouri House of Representatives.

== Career ==
He was first elected to the Missouri House of Representatives in 1966 and lived on a farm northwest of Springfield, Missouri. His wife Wanda Pearl Bain Blackwell died in 2014 at age 100.
