= Elise Blackwell =

American novelist

- Born: Baton Rouge, Louisiana, U.S.
- Education: Louisiana State University; University of California, Irvine
- Writing career
- Notable works: Hunger (2003); The Unnatural History of Cypress Parish (2007); Grub (2007); An Unfinished Score (2010); The Lower Quarter (2015)
- Website: eliseblackwell.com

Elise Blackwell is an American novelist and writer. She is the author of five novels, as well as numerous short stories and essays. Her books have been translated into five languages, adapted for the stage, and served as the inspiration for the song "When the War Came" by The Decemberists. She is host and organizer of the literary series The Open Book at the University of South Carolina, where she also teaches. In 2019, she was inducted into the South Carolina Academy of Authors.
