= Charles Gray Blackwell =

American politician

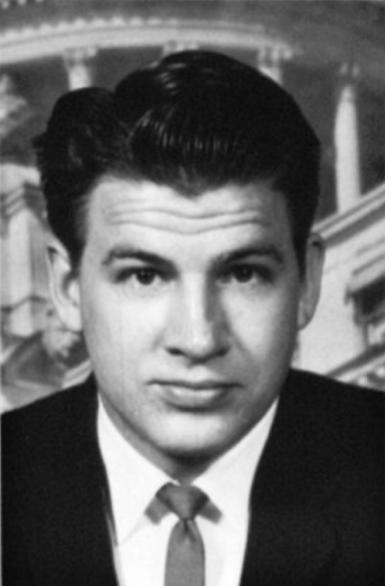

Member of the Mississippi House of Representatives
- In office 1960s–???

Personal details
- Born: March 4, 1939 Ellisville, Mississippi, U.S.
- Died: August 8, 2012 (aged 73)
- Education: University of Mississippi

Charles Gray Blackwell (March 4, 1939 – August 8, 2012) was an American politician. He served as a member of the Mississippi House of Representatives.

Charles was born and raised in Ellisville, Mississippi. He was the second born of six children. He attended Jones County Junior College in Ellisville, then transferred to The University of Mississippi to complete his undergraduate education. He remained a student at The University of Mississippi for law school.

With his first wife, Julia, he had three children: Charla, Charles Jr., and Gina. With his second wife, Joyce, he had one child, Melissa. At the time of his passing in 2012, he had 7 grandchildren.

Charles was a practicing attorney in Laurel, Mississippi, and Hattiesburg, Mississippi, for the rest of his career. He maintained his roots in Jones County, loved to help others, loved to travel, and spend time with his family.

== Life and career ==
Blackwell was born in Ellisville, Mississippi. He attended the University of Mississippi.

During the 1960s, Blackwell served in the Mississippi House of Representatives, and he was also the president of the Oxford Citizens Council.

Blackwell died in August 2012 at the age of 73.
