= William Blackwell =

Will or William Blackwell may refer to:

- Will Blackwell (born 1975), American football wide receiver
- William Blackwell (architect) (1850–1937), Canadian architect who worked in Peterborough, Ontario
- William Blackwell (captain), founder of Mortlake, Connecticut
- William Blackwell (pole vaulter), co-winner of the 1944 NCAA DI outdoor pole vault championship
- William H. Blackwell (1882–1963), American fruit farmer and politician
