= Brimslade Lock =

Canal lock in Wiltshire, England

Coordinates: 51.3695°N 1.7006°W

Brimslade Lock is on the Kennet and Avon Canal at Wootton Rivers, Wiltshire, England.

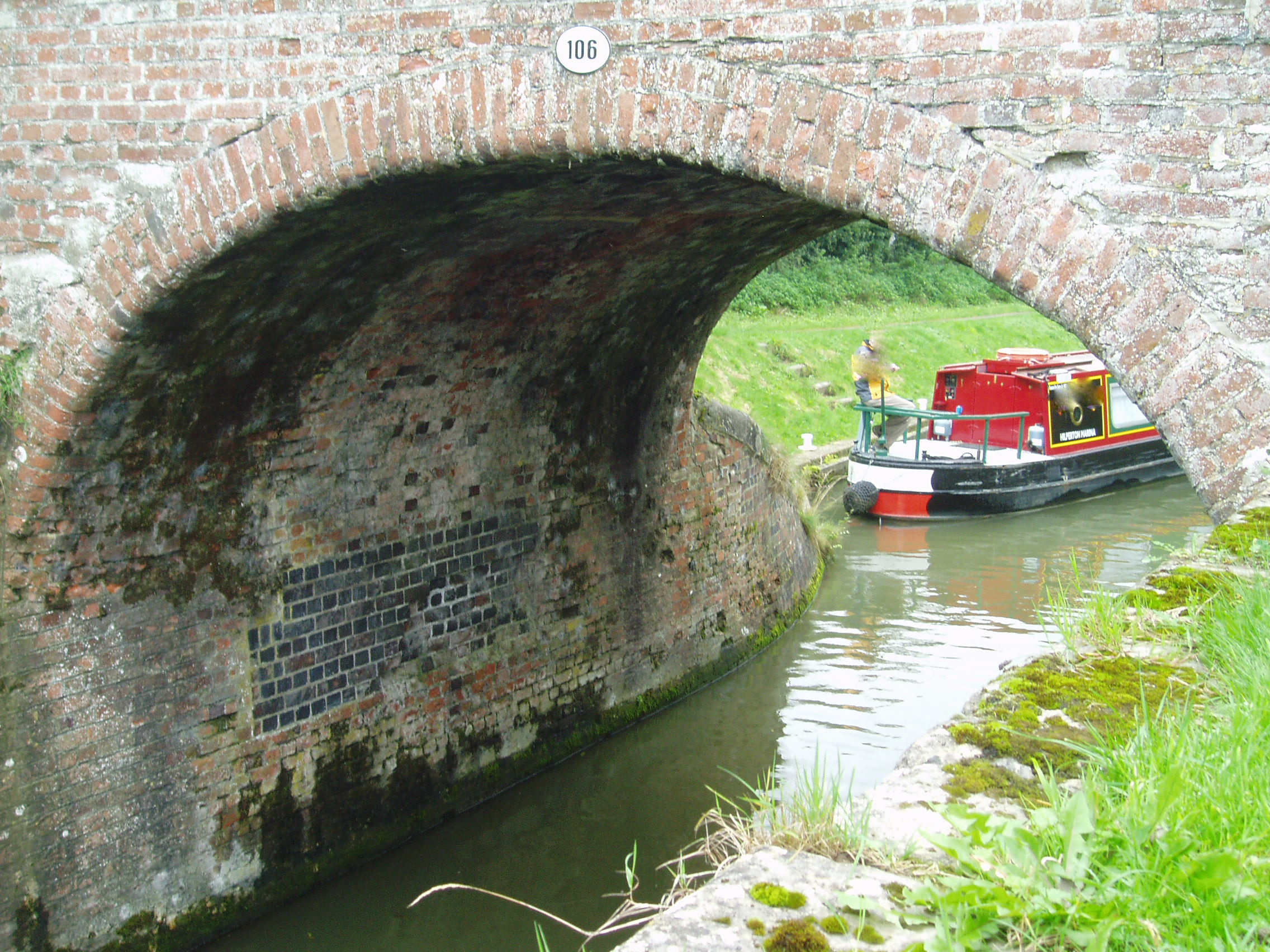

The lock has a rise/fall of 8 ft 0 in (2.43 m) and was built c.1810. Bridge 106 is at the lower end of the lock. The lock and bridge are Grade II listed structures.

== See also ==
- List of locks on the Kennet and Avon Canal

Next lock upstream	Kennet and Avon Canal	Next lock downstream
Wootton Top Lock	Brimslade Lock; Grid reference: SU209634	Heathy Close Lock
