= Moores Flat, California =

Moores Flat
- Former settlement
- Location in California
- Coordinates: 39°25′09″N 120°51′03″W
- Country: United States
- State: California
- County: Nevada County
- Elevation: 4,144 ft (1,263 m)

Moore's Flat was a historic mining town located on the San Juan Ridge about 19 miles northeast of Nevada City, California and about 5 miles northeast of North Bloomfield, California. The town was about 1 mile south of the Middle Yuba at an elevation of about 4200 ft. On either side of it, lay the mining towns of Orleans Flat and Woolsey's Flat, each about I mile apart. All three were settled around 1851 and their histories frequently intertwine. Collectively, they are sometimes referred to as "The Flats." All three were part of Eureka Township.

An early pioneer describes the physical relation of The Flats as follows: "Moore's Flat, Orleans Flat and Woolsey's Flat are all similarly situated on different points of the mountain, on the north side of the ridge between the South and Middle Yuba River, and all at about the same altitude. A very deep canyon lies between each of them, but a good mountain road was built around the head of each canyon, connecting the towns."

== Early history ==
The town was named after H. M. Moore, who settled here in 1851 and built a house and store. Moore was either the first settler, or the first married settler. Not long afterward, an effort was made to change the name to Clinton. That name never took and by 1857, the name Clinton was dropped in favor of Moore's Flat. By 1852, the town reportedly had about 500 residents, several stores, three hotels and "a large number of saloons." Initially, it was overshadowed by the other Flats, but as they declined in the late 1850s, and their residents moved to Moore's Flat, it became the leading town in that area.

Its heyday was in the 1860s and 70s. By the 1870s, it was considered the most important mining town in Eureka Township. The town was served by Langton's Express and by Gregory and English's stages, which connected to many of the towns on the Ridge, as well as to Marysville, Downieville and Nevada City. There was also a line which ran stages between the Flats every 15 minutes. Toll roads provided improved access to Nevada City and the Ridge communities. An enterprising stable owner established a branch in Nevada City and offered customers the option of renting a horse, dropping it off at the Nevada City branch while visiting there for a few days and then bringing the horse back to Moore's Flat, all for three dollars.

== Mining ==
As with the other Flats, mining was initially surface mining. As that became exhausted, mining using the hydraulic process commenced. At first, that was somewhat seasonal due to the lack of water during the summer. That changed with the arrival of water from the Poorman's Creek Ditch in 1854. Other ditches soon followed.

By all accounts, gold mining in the area was very successful. In 1867, Bean noted that “immense quantities of gold have been taken from the flats. In 1872, U.S. Commissioner of Mining Statistics Rossiter Raymond described Moore's Flat as a “thriving“ town, one of whose mines had produced $65,000 in gold during one year. In the early 1870s, the Marks & Co. bank alone bought an average of over $500,000 in gold dust annually. In 1900, it was estimated that 26,000,000 yards of gravel has been washed away in the area and 15,000,000 yards remained.

Despite the overall prosperity of the mines in the area, there was periodic mining strife over two issues: the price of water and the price of labor. The price of water was of immense importance to the smaller mines that were not owned by a water company. Hence, in 1874, mining was interrupted by a price dispute. Miners wanted to pay 8 cents an inch, not 12.5. Mining resumed when the Milton Mining and Water Company brought a new ditch to the area, lowering the price of water.

== Miners unions ==
Labor-management strife centered around miners' wages, and, to some extent, the related issue of use of Chinese miners, who often were paid less than other miners. In early 1865, reacting to an attempt by mine owners to reduce the wages of $3.50 or $4 a day by 50 cents, the miners organized the Moore's Flat Working-men's Protective Society. A Constitution and By-laws were adopted, and about fifty men joined. In late March, the miners struck the Illinois Company which had reduced wages. A miner who tried to return to work at the lower wage was assaulted.

In early 1877, a new Miners Union was formed in Moore's Flat. Its formative resolution announced in socialist-sounding terms that: "We hold this truth to be self evident, that the laborer is worthy of his hire; and ... it is only by unity of action on the part of the laboring masses, as against aggregated capital, that labor can hope, comparatively to hold its own..."

Mining was often dangerous, especially around the Flats. One newspaper observed that: "There have been at Moore’s and Woolsey’s Flats a great many accidents, recently, among miners and most of them have proved fatal." In part, this was because the gold lay under very deep gravel causing the miners to cut steep banks which produced frequent cave-ins. One consequence of the cave-ins caused by hydraulic mining was that the town was sliding away. Wrote an observer: "If any one wants to see a town sliding down hill, they can do so by going to Moore's Flat. The mines in the vicinity have washed close up to the town, and the banks are continually caving. Many of the houses have been moved to a place this side of the old town, which the residents call Jerico."

== Sawyer decision ==
Hydraulic mining produced a lot of debris in the form of gravel and dirt that washed into the Yuba River. Eventually, this debris and the sludge that came with, called slickens, interfered with farming in the Sacramento Valley. The farmers responded by filing lawsuits. 1881, the Miners Union announced a boycott of Marysville and any other town trying to stop hydraulic mining. They explained: "This Union is made up of 203 intelligent, industrious and sober men, most of them having large families to support. They recognize that the permanent stoppage of hydraulic mining means nothing more nor less than the ruination of a large portion of Nevada county that is now thickly populated and prosperous,..." Finally, in 1884, Judge Lorenzo Sawyer ruled that the mines were creating a nuisance and ordered them to stop discharging their debris into the Yuba River or its tributaries. This effectively ended much hydraulic mining in Nevada County. As the Miners Union had predicted, it led to the decline of many mining communities.

Following the Sawyer decision, mining gradually returned to Moore's Flat. Some miners continued to hydraulic and discharge their debris illegally while others tried to contain their debris in tailing ponds. Yuba County even offered a $500 reward for detecting a violation of the injunction. But most continued drifting, which produced less debris. In 1896, a paper reported that: "Moore's Flat, although dead for a number of years, has at last come to the front. There has been quite a boom in mining."

== Post office ==
A post office was established In 1854, with the name of the town as Clinton. Josiah Cook was the first postmaster. As mentioned above, the name Clinton was never popular with the residents and in 1857, the name of the post office was changed to Moore's Flat. During the winter months, there were times when the town was so snowbound that mail had to be delivered by sled or by snowshoes. The post office was discontinued briefly in 1903 because “no one could be found to accept it." it was finally closed in 1914, after which residents got their mail in North Bloomfield.

== Major fires ==
While fires were common in mining towns, Moore's Flat seems to have had more than its fair share.

In January 1863, a fire which originated in the Franco American Restaurant, burned the Eagle Brewery, Justice (of the Peace) Stanley's office, and two adjoining buildings. Damage was estimated at $5,000.

On May 19, 1865, On May 19, 1865, a fire destroyed about a third of the town, including Moore's Hotel, Zellerbach's bank, several shops and saloons, the drugstore, the furniture store, the express office and the post office. The loss was estimated at $30,000. Arson was suspected.

In September 1868, the Moore's Flat Brewery burned down, a $2000 loss.

On July 31, 1869, another fire destroyed much of the town. The fire began in a Chinese store on Washington Street, and burned much of the Chinese quarter. In all, about 40 buildings were destroyed including several hotels, the Masonic Hall, many homes and about 15 stores and businesses, including a shoe shop, barber shop, drugstore, bank, blacksmith shop and two stables. Total loss was estimated at $100,000 of which about a third was covered by insurance. After this fire, there was little rebuilding at the site. Instead, residents moved about a half mile south and built essentially a new town.

In October 1870, a fire destroyed much of the rebuilt town, including the Masonic Hall and Marks & Co's bank. Loss was estimated at $130,000.

In February 1883, a fire destroyed many buildings, including a saloon, Brigham's bank, a drugstore and post office, a brewery and other buildings. The next year, a fire destroyed 2 hotels, a brewery and a butcher shop.

== Daily life ==
Perhaps because its mines were so profitable, Moore's Flat seems to have enjoyed more social and cultural amenities then many other mining towns. It had specialty shops such as a shoe store and a dressmaker. It had two banks, doctors and lawyers. Touring companies of entertainers frequently gave performances. Sporting events included prizefights, horse races, and a bowling alley. McCaffrey's Race Course hosted events such as foot races, dogfights and turkey shoots. It had its own brass band. One paper described it as "perhaps...the liveliest mountain town in the State."

The town had its own school house, described thusly: "The building is very old and badly out of repair, but the inside is comfortably furnished. Outline maps, charts and good black-boards excuse many other defects about a schoolroom. Still the building is not creditable to the enterprise and wealth of the people of Moore’s Flat." In 1868, the school had 112 students.

An electoral district was centered on Moore's Flat. In the 1864 presidential election, 224 votes were cast, 124 for Lincoln and 100 for McClellan. In 1868, 188 votes were recorded, 96 for Grant. By the 1880 election, only 142 votes were cast, 81 for Hancock and 61 for Garfield. Locally, voters elected a justice of the peace and a constable.

There were several social and civic organizations. In 1863, the local Masonic Lodge, Quitman Lodge, # 88, moved its building from Orleans Flat, by then largely deserted, to Moore's Flat. The building was blown down in a windstorm in the winter of 1867 and immediately rebuilt. It was also rebuilt after the fire in July 1869, burned again in October 1870 and rebuilt in 1871. An Oddfellows Lodge was established on October 22, 1870, sharing the Masonic hall. In 1873, the Ancient Order of Hibernians organized a lodge.

Given the presence of many saloons, it is not surprising that a Sons of Temperance Union branch was founded. Worshipers could attend Saint Josephs Catholic Church which was constructed in 1869. Fathers Dalton and Griffin came from Grass Valley to preside over services. There were also non-denominational services held at the temperance hall.

But Moore's Flat also had its share of violence including murders and robberies.

== Chinese community ==
Moore's Flat had a large Chinese community. One estimate is that there were 500 Chinese miners around Moore's Flat. They were also mines owned by Chinese. The mine owned by Wau Yen reportedly cost $70,000 and employed about 100 miners. The Chinese quarter was centered around Washington Street and was greatly destroyed by the fire of 1869.

== Moore's Flat in the 20th century ==
Following the Sawyer decision, Moore's Flat began a rapid decline. In 1924, it was described as follows: "Moore's Flat, from a town of three hotels, a bank and three stores, in 1890, has dwindled until it is but a name, there being at the present time only one family living in Moore’s Flat proper“

Today, there is nothing readily visible of the town, except lots of rockpiles, some old mining equipment and the historic cemetery.
