= Resident engineer =

In general, a resident engineer is a person who works at or from the clients' side of a project. The engineer possesses a high degree of technical and social skills. One of the main goals of the designated role is to foster knowledge transfer. The role exists across various industries with historic roots in the construction business.

== Construction ==
A resident engineer is a specific construction occupation. It often describes an engineer employed to work from site for the client or the design engineer. The duties include supervision of and issuing of instructions to the contractor and to report regularly to the designer and/or client. The role was common historically and was also defined in the Institution of Civil Engineers Conditions of Contract and FIDIC contracts. It is not a defined role in the commonly used and more modern NEC Engineering and Construction Contract in which similar roles are named as the client's "project manager" and "supervisor".

=== Rail ===
According to Caltrain Standard Manuals "Resident Engineer's Manual", the resident is "the individual designated to administer construction management matters on specific contracts, with authority delegated by the Agency’s Project Manager."

== See also ==
- Construction management
- Virtual team
- Distributed development
