= William Rootes =

William Rootes may refer to:

- William Rootes, 1st Baron Rootes (1894–1964), founder of the Rootes Group
- William Geoffrey Rootes (1917–1992), 2nd Baron Rootes

== See also ==
- William Roots (1911–1971), British Conservative politician
