= Froxfield Middle Lock =

Canal lock in Froxfield, Wiltshire, England

Coordinates: 51.40483°N 1.56866°W

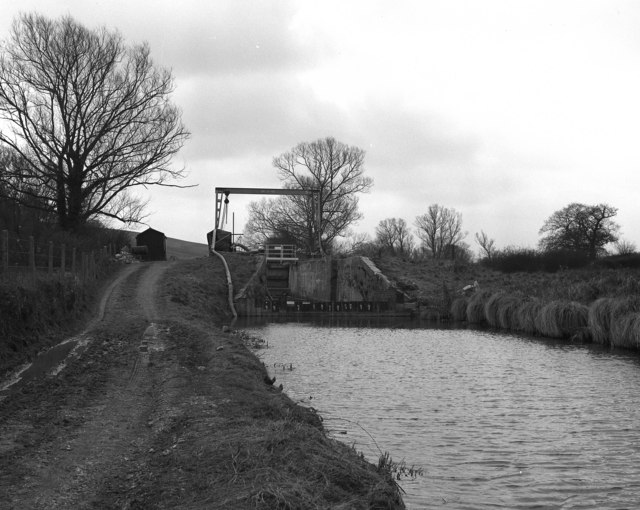
Froxfield Middle Lock under reconstruction in 1976

Froxfield Middle Lock is a lock on the Kennet and Avon Canal, at Froxfield, Wiltshire, England.

The lock has a rise/fall of 6 ft 11 in (2.11 m).

== See also ==
- Locks on the Kennet and Avon Canal

Next lock upstream	Kennet and Avon Canal	Next lock downstream
Oakhill Down Lock	Froxfield Middle Lock; Grid reference: SU301674	Froxfield Bottom Lock
