= Brunsden =

Brunsden may refer to:

- Edwin William Brunsden (1896–1976), Canadian agronomist and politician
- Brunsden Lock, lock in on the Kennet and Avon Canal in Berkshire, England
