= Froxfield =

Village and civil parish in Wiltshire, England

Coordinates: 51.410°N 1.574°W

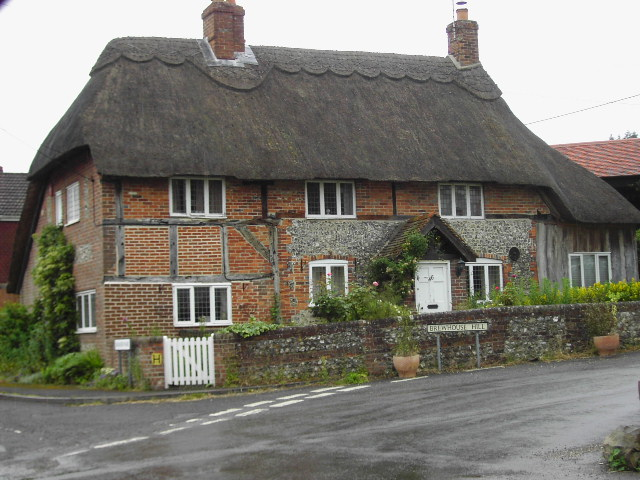
- Thatched cottage at Froxfield

- Location within Wiltshire
- Population: 382 (2011 Census)
- OS grid reference: SU297680
- Civil parish: Froxfield
- Unitary authority: Wiltshire
- Ceremonial county: Wiltshire
- Region: South West
- Country: England
- Sovereign state: United Kingdom
- Post town: Marlborough
- Postcode district: SN8
- Dialling code: 01488
- Police: Wiltshire
- Fire: Dorset and Wiltshire
- Ambulance: South Western
- UK Parliament: East Wiltshire
- Website: Parish Council

Froxfield is a village and civil parish in the English county of Wiltshire. The parish is on the Wiltshire-West Berkshire border, and the village lies on the A4 national route about 2.5 miles (4 km) west of Hungerford and 7 miles (11 km) east of Marlborough.

Froxfield village is on a stream that is a tributary of the River Dun. The road between London and Bristol follows the valley of the stream and passes through the village, having followed this course since at least the 13th century.

The Kennet and Avon Canal follows the Dun valley through Froxfield parish, passing within 550 yards (500 m) of the village. The canal has a series of locks in the parish, from Oakhill Down Lock to Froxfield Bottom Lock. The Reading to Taunton railway line also follows the river through the parish below the village.

== Archaeology ==
There used to be three bowl barrows in the south-west part of the parish, close to the boundary with Chisbury parish. These suggest human occupation in the area some time in the Neolithic or Bronze Age.

In 1725 the remains of a Roman villa were found at Rudge Coppice about 1.5 miles (2.4 km) north-west of the village. Remains excavated on the site include a Roman mosaic floor depicting the figure of a man, coins, human burials, a stone statuette of Attis and a champlevé-enamelled bronze bowl known as the Rudge Cup, that appears to depict Hadrian's Wall, and lists its five westernmost forts.

== History ==
The Kennet and Avon Canal was opened through Froxfield parish in 1799, and the Berks and Hants Extension Railway took the same route, immediately north of the canal, in 1862. The nearest station was some 2 1/2 miles (4 km) southwest of Froxfield village, at Great Bedwyn. The canal was restored in the 1970s; the railway and station are still in use.

The population of Froxfield parish peaked at 625 at the 1841 census, owing to stagecoach activity along the Bath road; numbers declined steadily as traffic took to the railways. Between 1951 and 1981 the population was below 300, then increased after housebuilding during the 1980s.

RAF Ramsbury, used by the United States Army Air Forces between 1942 and 1946, extended into the extreme north of the parish.

=== Manor ===
Between AD 801 and 805, one Byrhtelm granted land at Froxfield to Ealhmund, Bishop of Winchester. There is no further record of Froxfield's manorial tenure from then until the 13th century. The Domesday Book of 1086 does not mention Froxfield, and may therefore have included the manor as part of another landholding.

Froxfield reappears in the historical record in 1242–43, when Baldwin de Redvers, 6th Earl of Devon was its feudal overlord. In 1275 the overlord was Baldwin's heir Isabella de Fortibus, Countess of Devon, but there is no evidence of Froxfield passing to her heirs. John de Cobham, 3rd Baron Cobham was overlord in 1389, but there is no record of Froxfield's overlordship thereafter.

Manorial tenants of Froxfield included Walter Marshal, 5th Earl of Pembroke (died 1245) and John Droxford, who was Bishop of Bath and Wells 1309–1329.

In 1390 Sir William Sturmy gave the manor to Easton Priory, which then held Froxfield until the Dissolution of the Monasteries. In 1536 the Crown granted the manor to Sir Edward Seymour, Viscount Beauchamp, who in 1547 made himself Duke of Somerset. After the death of John Seymour, 4th Duke of Somerset in 1675, his widow Sarah Seymour, Duchess of Somerset married Henry Hare, 2nd Baron Coleraine. However, when she died in 1694 she left most of Froxfield Manor as an endowment to found the Broad Town charity and Duchess of Somerset's Hospital almshouses (see below). The hospital sold most of its lands in the parish in 1920–22.

In 1922 Sir Ernest Wills, 3rd Baronet, part-owner of the W.D. & H.O. Wills tobacco company, bought Froxfield Manor Farm, before purchasing the adjacent Elizabethan country house, Littlecote House, in 1929. In 1965 William Geoffrey Rootes, 2nd Baron Rootes bought some other parts of the manor lands and added them to his estate of North Standen and Oakhill. In 1995 Wills's grandson Sir Seton Wills, 5th Baronet still held part of the original estate north of London Road.

== Church and chapel ==
The Church of England parish church of All Saints is from the 12th century and is built of flint and sarsen. The chancel was rebuilt in the 13th century with Early English Gothic lancet windows. In the 14th new windows were inserted in the nave and a north door was added. The Perpendicular Gothic west window is 15th century, as is the partly timber-framed porch. The font is from the 12th or 13th century. There are two bells, one cast c.1699 and the other in 1887.

In 1891–92 All Saints' was restored under the direction of the Gothic Revival architect Ewan Christian. His alterations included replacing the bell-turret with a more elaborate one, replacing a plain south window in the nave with an elaborate one in 15th-century style and replacing the vestry with a larger vestry and organ chamber in the style of a north transept. The church was designated as Grade II* listed in 1966. The parish has been served by a team ministry since 1976, and today is part of the Whitton Team, a group of six churches.

A Methodist congregation was established in Froxfield by 1834, when two houses in the village were licensed for Wesleyan Methodist worship. A small red-brick Primitive Methodist chapel was built on Brewhouse Hill in 1909; it closed for worship in about 1962.

== Somerset charities ==
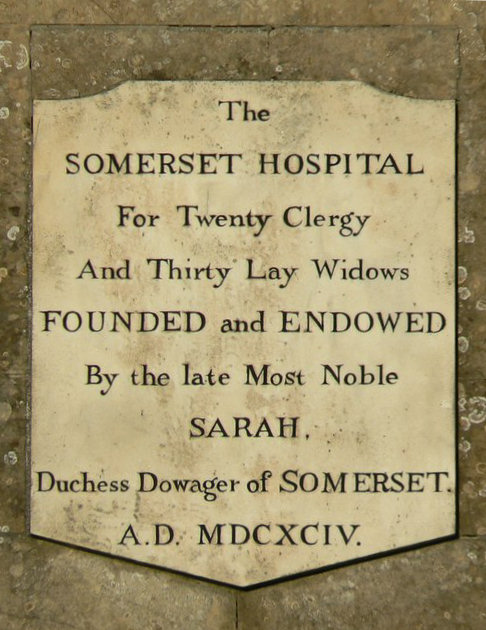
Dedication plaque

When Sarah Seymour, Duchess of Somerset died in 1694, her substantial will of 1686 included two charities relevant to Froxfield. The Broad Town charity was to help young men with their education or to enter apprenticeships. It is now the Broad Town Trust, and since 1990 it has been open to young women applicants as well as young men.

The Duchess also willed that almshouses and a chapel be built at Froxfield for 30 widows from Berkshire, Somerset, Wiltshire, London and Westminster, of whom half were to be widows of clergy. She willed that the Rector of Huish was to either serve as chaplain or provide another clergyman to do so; in practice the parish priest of Froxfield has usually served the hospital in his place.

The Duchess left the estate of Froxfield Manor as an endowment to the almshouses, called the Duchess of Somerset's Hospital. One of the trustees of the Duchess's will was her brother-in-law, Sir Samuel Grimston, 3rd Baronet, who refused to convey the prescribed lands and income to the hospital until he was ordered to do so by the Court of Chancery.

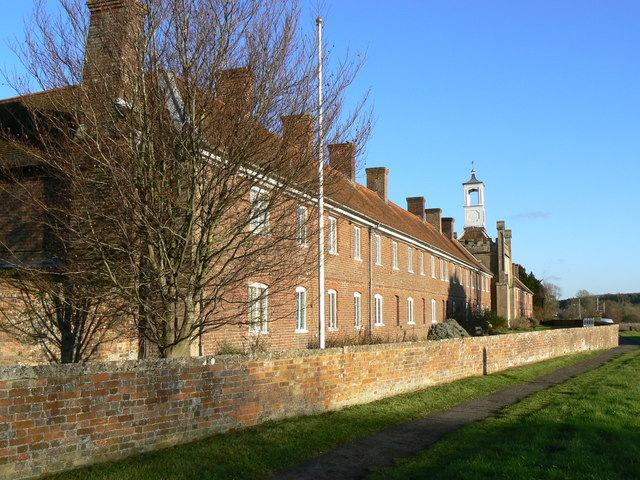
The Somerset Hospital

The original almshouses are built of brick around a quadrangle, with the chapel in the centre. In 1772–75 one range of seven almshouses was demolished and the hospital was enlarged to a length of 37 bays. This enabled it to accommodate 50 widows and eligibility was extended from its original geographical catchment area to include widows from anywhere in England within 150 miles (240 km) of London.

In 1813 or 1814 Charles Brudenell-Bruce, 1st Marquess of Ailesbury paid for the original chapel to be demolished and replaced by a new, presumably larger one built in its place, designed by the architect Thomas Baldwin of Bath. A new gateway to the hospital was added at the same time. The gateway and chapel are of ashlar masonry in a Georgian Gothick style.

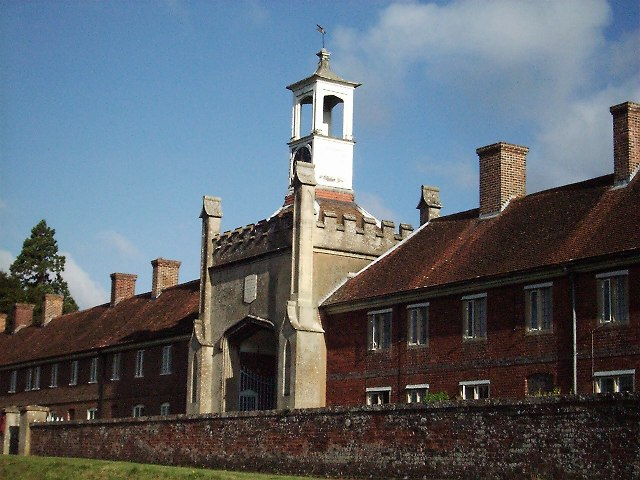
The gatehouse

The hospital's investment income began to decline and from 1851 it made successive reductions to the resident widows' pensions. From 1882 it started to leave vacant almshouses unoccupied to save money and in 1892 parishes in London and Westminster complained that they were not being given their allocation of places at the hospital. In 1897 the Charity Commission found the hospital was housing only 16 widows, and by 1921 this number had fallen to 13.

In 1920–22 the Hospital sold its lands and increased its income by investing the capital. By 1922 it had increased its residents to 25 and increased their pensions. In 1963 the chapel was restored. In 1966 the Hospital broadened eligibility to any poor woman over 55. Gifts from other charities, public bodies and private donations were invested in maintaining and improving the almshouses. By 1995 it provided 45 houses and four flats for widows and one house reserved for guests.

The dwellings and gatehouse were designated as Grade II* listed in 1966, as was the chapel.

== School ==
In the early part of the 19th century, most children from Froxfield who attended school did so in Little Bedwyn, Hungerford or Great Bedwyn. By 1871 a school had opened in Froxfield, but in 1884 it served only as an infants' school for children under six. It was rebuilt in 1885 to accommodate older children but was closed in 1907. A new school was built near the parish church and opened in 1910, taking children of all ages from five upwards, until 1948 when those over 11 were transferred to Marlborough Secondary Modern School. Falling pupil numbers led to closure of the school in 1963.

== Amenities ==
The village has a public house, the Pelican Inn; the 18th-century building to the east of the village was originally a terrace of three cottages. There is a village hall.

== Notable people ==
Lewis Evans (1755–1827), vicar of Froxfield from 1788 until his death, was also a mathematical master at the Royal Military Academy, Woolwich, and was recognised by the Royal Astronomical Society as an astronomical observer.

Constance Savery (1897–1999), a prolific writer of novels and children's books, was born at Froxfield while her father was the vicar.
