= Cobbler's Lock =

Canal lock in Berkshire, England

Coordinates: 51.41372°N 1.53982°W

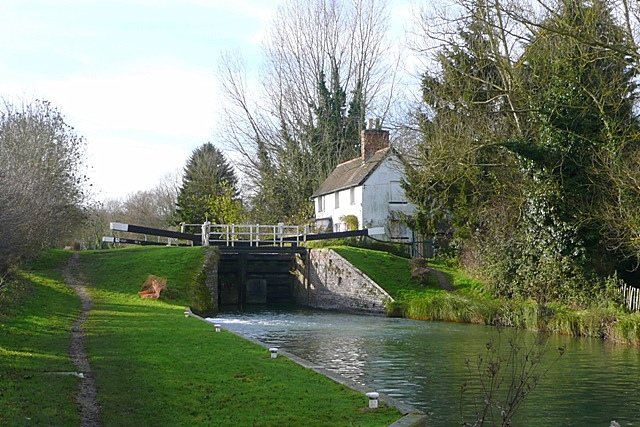
Cobbler's Lock

Cobbler's Lock is a lock on the Kennet and Avon Canal, near Hungerford, Berkshire, England.

The lock has a rise/fall of 8 ft 3 in (2.51 m).

== See also ==
- Locks on the Kennet and Avon Canal

Next lock upstream	Kennet and Avon Canal	Next lock downstream
Picketfield Lock	Cobbler's Lock; Grid reference: SU321684	Hungerford Marsh Lock
