= Wire Lock =

Canal lock in Berkshire, England

Coordinates: 51.41077°N 1.47946°W

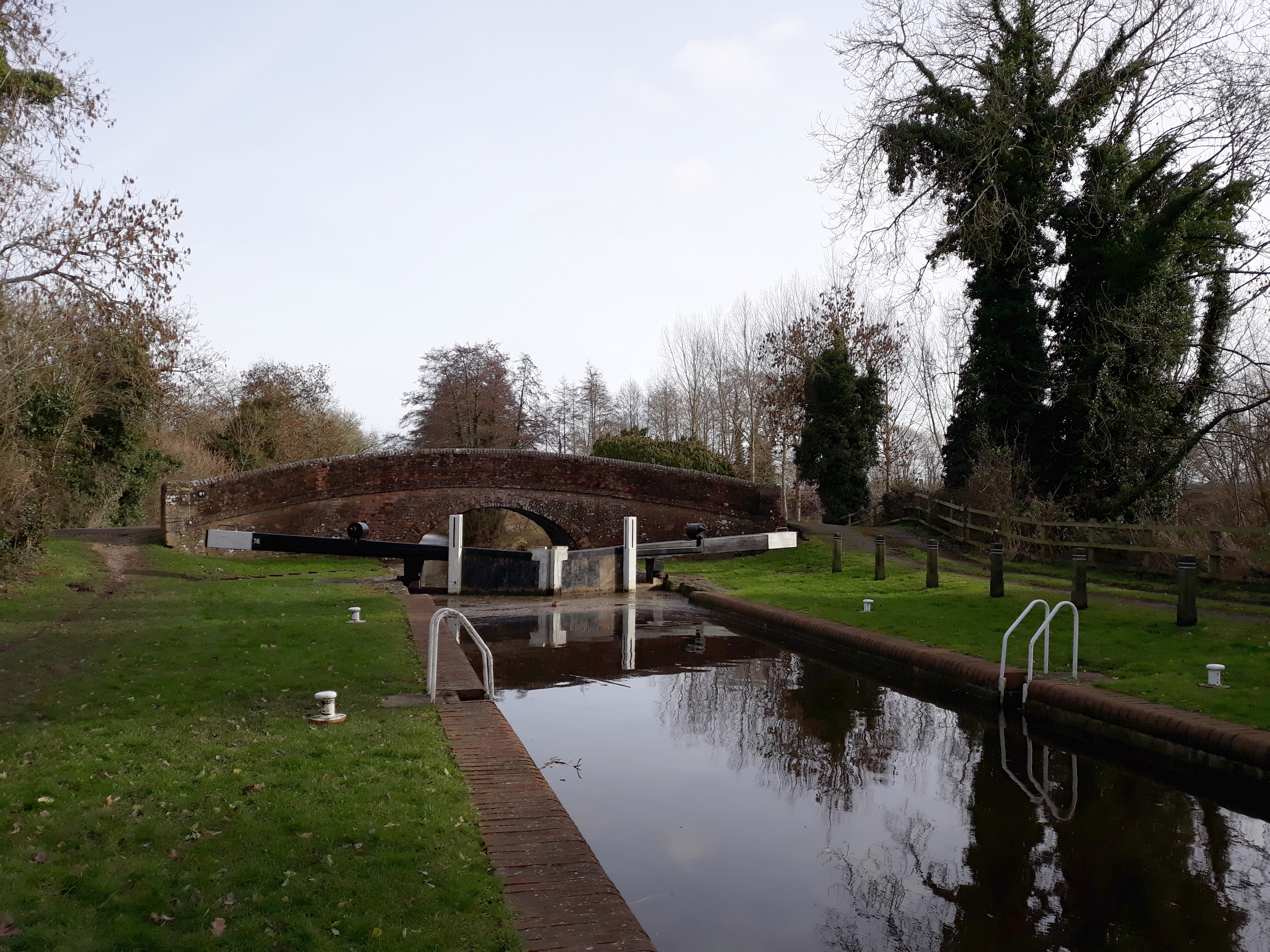
Wire Lock

Wire Lock is a lock on the Kennet and Avon Canal, near Hungerford, Berkshire, England.

It is a grade II listed building.

== See also ==
- Locks on the Kennet and Avon Canal

| Next lock upstream | Kennet and Avon Canal | Next lock downstream |
| Dun Mill Lock | Wire Lock; Grid reference: SU363681 | Brunsden Lock |
