= Hungerford Lock =

Canal lock in Hungerford, Berkshire, England

Coordinates: 51.41633°N 1.51823°W

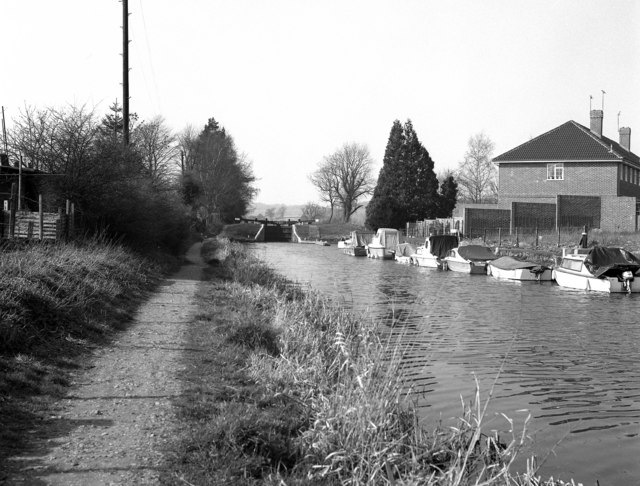
Hungerford Lock in 1976

Hungerford Lock is a lock on the Kennet and Avon Canal, at Hungerford, Berkshire, England.

The lock has a rise/fall of 8 ft 0 in (2.44 m).

== See also ==
- Locks on the Kennet and Avon Canal

Next lock upstream	Kennet and Avon Canal	Next lock downstream
Hungerford Marsh Lock	Hungerford Lock; Grid reference: SU336687	Dun Mill Lock
