= Hungerford Marsh Lock =

Canal lock in Berkshire, England

Coordinates: 51.41459°N 1.53262°W

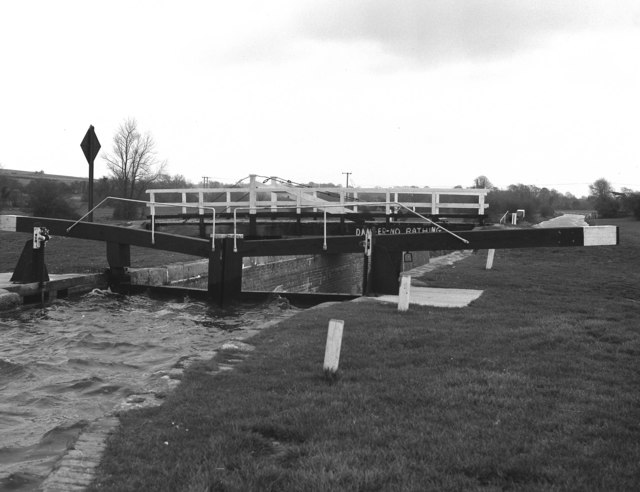
Hungerford Marsh Lock and swing bridge

Hungerford Marsh Lock is a lock on the Kennet and Avon Canal, at Hungerford, Berkshire, England.

The lock has a rise/fall of 8 ft 1 in (2.46 m).

The lock is unique compared to others on the canal in that it has a swing bridge directly over the centre of the lock that must be opened before the lock may be used.

== See also ==
- Locks on the Kennet and Avon Canal

Next lock upstream	Kennet and Avon Canal	Next lock downstream
Cobbler's Lock	Hungerford Marsh Lock; Grid reference: SU326685	Hungerford Lock
