= Baron Rootes =

Barony in the Peerage of the United Kingdom

Baron Rootes, of Ramsbury in the County of Wiltshire, is a title in the Peerage of the United Kingdom. It was created on 16 February 1959 for the businessman Sir William Rootes. He was head of the motor car manufacturer Rootes Ltd and, following his death, his son William Geoffrey Rootes became the new chairman in 1964. The company was acquired during the late 1960s by Chrysler and renamed Chrysler UK in 1970. As of 2010 the title is held by his grandson, the third Baron, who succeeded his father in 1992.

== Barons Rootes (1959) ==
- William Edward Rootes, 1st Baron Rootes (1894–1964)
- (William) Geoffrey Rootes, 2nd Baron Rootes (1917–1992)
- Nicholas Geoffrey Rootes, 3rd Baron Rootes (b. 1951)

The heir presumptive and sole heir to the barony is the present holder's first cousin William Brian Rootes (b. 1944).

== Arms ==
Coat of arms of Baron Rootes
Crest On a wreath Argent and Vert a cubit arm bendwise in armour Or the hand Proper grasping a spear in bend also Proper flying therefrom a forked pennon barry Argent and Azure semée of plates and bezants. Escutcheon Ermine within an orle Azure a bugle horn sable garnished Or stringed Gules. Supporters On either side a horse argent gorged with a chain pendant therefrom a wheel Or. Motto Prorsum In Futurum (Forward Into The Future) Badge A horse's head erased Argent gorged with a riband Gules pendant therefrom by a riband Azure a bugle horn Sable garnished Or.
