= Froxfield Bottom Lock =

Canal lock in Froxfield, Wiltshire, England

Coordinates: 51.40662°N 1.56577°W

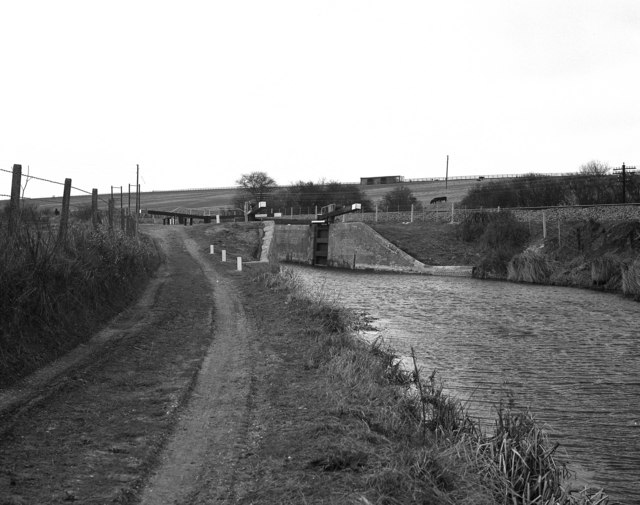
Froxfield Bottom Lock after reconstruction in 1976

Froxfield Bottom Lock is a lock on the Kennet and Avon Canal, at Froxfield, Wiltshire, England.

The lock has a rise/fall of 7 ft 0 in (2.13 m).

== See also ==
- Locks on the Kennet and Avon Canal

Next lock upstream	Kennet and Avon Canal	Next lock downstream
Froxfield Middle Lock	Froxfield Bottom Lock; Grid reference: SU303676	Picketfield Lock
