= Picketfield Lock =

Canal lock in Berkshire, England

Coordinates: 51.41015°N 1.54848°W

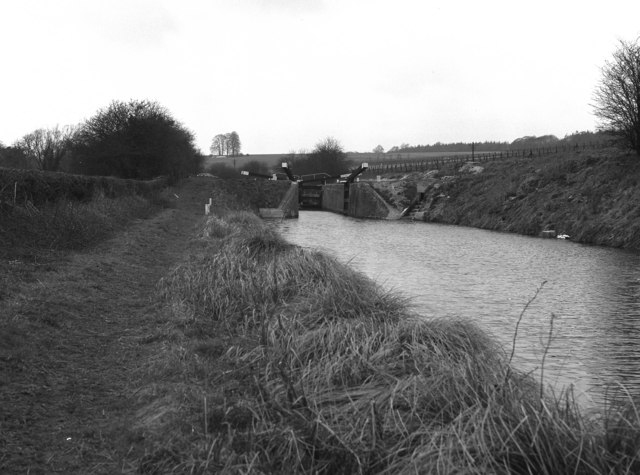
Picketfield Lock following restoration in 1976

Picketfield Lock is a lock on the Kennet and Avon Canal, near Hungerford, Berkshire, England.

The lock has a rise/fall of 7 ft 0 in (2.13 m).

== See also ==
- Locks on the Kennet and Avon Canal

Next lock upstream	Kennet and Avon Canal	Next lock downstream
Froxfield Bottom Lock	Picketfield Lock; Grid reference: SU315680	Cobbler's Lock
