= Dun Mill Lock =

Canal lock in Berkshire, England

Coordinates: 51.4117°N 1.4960°W

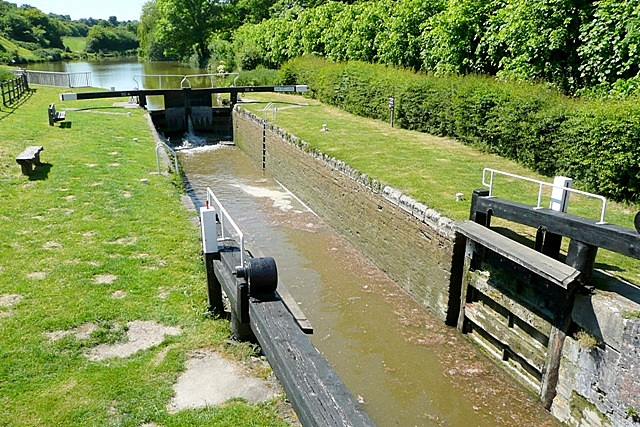
Dun Mill Lock

Dun Mill Lock is a lock on the Kennet and Avon Canal, near Hungerford, Berkshire, England.

The lock has a rise/fall of 5 ft 8 in (1.73 m).

It is a grade II listed building.

== See also ==
- Locks on the Kennet and Avon Canal

Next lock upstream	Kennet and Avon Canal	Next lock downstream
Hungerford Lock	Dun Mill Lock; Grid reference SU352683	Wire Lock
