= Oakhill Down Lock =

Canal lock in Froxfield, Wiltshire, England

Coordinates: 51.40215°N 1.57156°W

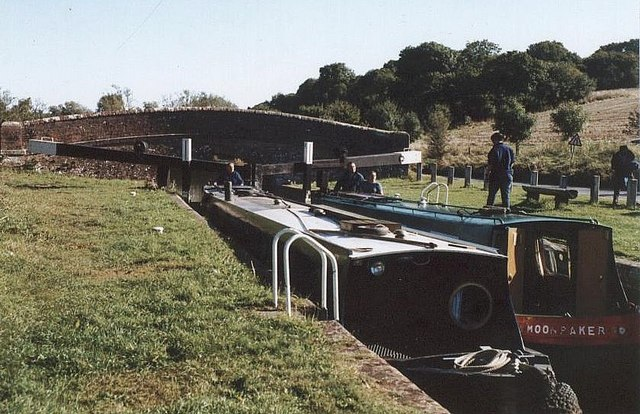
Boats leaving the lock

Oakhill Down Lock is a lock on the Kennet and Avon Canal, at Froxfield, Wiltshire, England, between Newbury Bridge and Pewsey Wharf.

The lock was built between 1794 and 1799, and has a rise/fall of 5 ft 11 in (1.80 m). The lock and bridge are Grade II listed structures.

== See also ==
- List of locks on the Kennet and Avon Canal

Next lock upstream	Kennet and Avon Canal	Next lock downstream
Little Bedwyn Lock	Oakhill Down Lock; Grid reference: SU299671	Froxfield Middle Lock
