= William Rootes, 1st Baron Rootes =

British motor manufacturer

The Lord Rootes
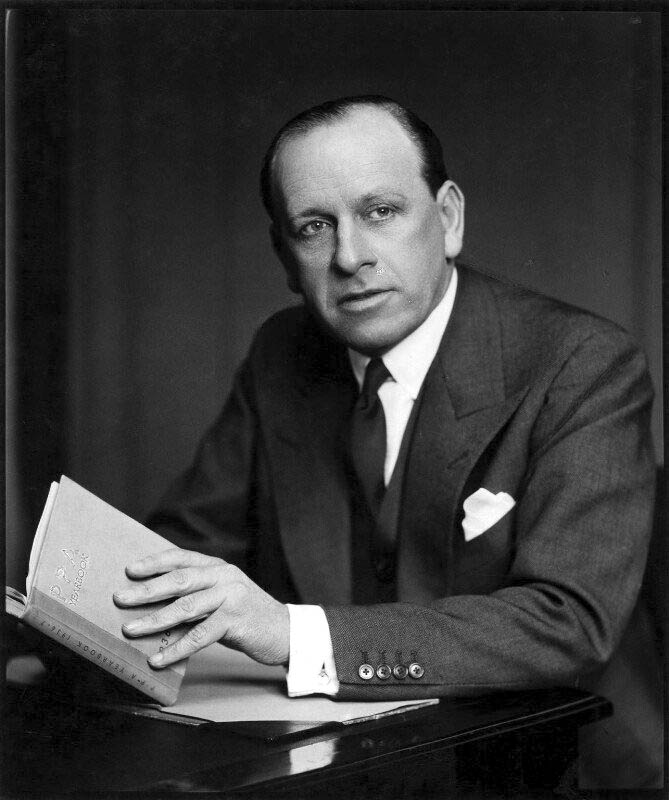
- Rootes in 1937
- Born: William Edward Rootes; 17 August 1894; Goudhurst
- Died: 12 December 1964 (aged 70)
- Occupation: Businessman
- Known for: Founder of Rootes Group

William Edward Rootes, 1st Baron Rootes GBE (17 August 1894 – 12 December 1964) (Billy Rootes; The Lord Rootes) was a British motor manufacturer. He opened his first car sales agency in 1913, leading to the global Rootes Group. During the Second World War he supervised the volume manufacture of aircraft and engines, as well as the supply of military motor vehicles and armoured fighting vehicles. He was knighted in 1942 for these services and for organising the reconstruction of bomb-damaged Coventry after its saturation bombing by the Luftwaffe on 14–15 November 1940. In the 1950s, he became a leader of Britain's export drive, and chaired a committee to found the University of Warwick with a vision of academic links with industry.

== Early life ==
William (Billy) Rootes was born in Goudhurst, Kent. His father, also William, owned a general engineering business in Goudhurst, which included bicycle production. William (Snr) attended a motor show organised by Sir David Salomons in Tunbridge Wells in 1895. Billy and his brother Reginald (Reggie) shared their father's interest in things mechanical.

Billy attended Cranbrook School, and on leaving school in 1909 was apprenticed to the Singer car company. His father had moved the family business to Hawkhurst by this time, and expanded into the motor trade.

== Career ==
Billy left Singer in 1913 to start his own car agency, independent of his father's business. He sold all of his first batch of cars within a few months of leaving Singer. The business was moved to Maidstone before the First World War, and the firm worked on the maintenance and repair of aero engines during the war.

By 1924, the Rootes company had become the largest truck and car distributor in the United Kingdom. From 1929 it expanded into manufacturing by buying established companies, beginning with Hillman, Humber and Commer. Rootes Group became a major vehicle manufacturer, with overseas distribution and vehicle assembly arms.

During the Second World War, Billy supervised the volume manufacture of aircraft and engines, as well as the supply of military motor vehicles and armoured fighting vehicles.

In the 1950s, he became a leader of Britain's export drive, and chaired a committee to found the University of Warwick with a vision of academic links with industry.

== Public honours ==
William and his brother Reginald were knighted in 1942 and 1946 respectively for their wartime work in setting up shadow factories. William was created a baron in 1959: his eldest son would accordingly become the second Baron Rootes on William's death.

== Personal life ==
Rootes married his first wife, Nora Press, in 1916. The marriage produced two sons, William Geoffrey Rootes (1917–1992) who between 1967 and 1973 served as chairman of the family business (at that time a subsidiary of Chrysler Corporation and renamed as Chrysler United Kingdom) and Brian Gordon Rootes (1919–1971) who held a succession of senior positions within the company between 1937 and 1967, interrupted by a period of military service during the Second World War.

In 1958, Rootes bought Ramsbury Manor, a country house in Wiltshire.

== Death and legacy ==
William Rootes died in 1964. It had been intended that he would be the first Chancellor of the University of Warwick; he is commemorated there by the Rootes Social Building, Rootes student residences, both built around 1966; and by the Lord Rootes Memorial Fund.

== Arms ==
Coat of arms of William Rootes, 1st Baron Rootes
Crest On a wreath Argent and Vert a cubit arm bendwise in armour Or the hand Proper grasping a spear in bend also Proper flying therefrom a forked pennon barry Argent and Azure semée of plates and bezants. Escutcheon Ermine within an orle Azure a bugle horn sable garnished Or stringed Gules. Supporters On either side a horse argent gorged with a chain pendant therefrom a wheel Or. Motto Prorsum in Futurum (Forward into The Future) Orders Order of the British Empire, Knight Grand Cross (GBE) Badge A horse's head erased Argent gorged with a riband Gules pendant therefrom by a riband Azure a bugle horn Sable garnished Or.

== See also ==
- Rootes Group

Peerage of the United Kingdom
New creation	Baron Rootes; 1959-1964	Succeeded by William Geoffrey Rootes
