= William Geoffrey Rootes =

(William) Geoffrey Rootes, 2nd Baron Rootes (14 June 1917 – 16 January 1992) was the chairman of Rootes Motors (1964–1967), Chrysler UK (1967–1978) and Britain's National Economic Development Council (1968–1973).

== Early life ==
Rootes was the first son of William Edward Rootes and Nora Press and was educated at Port Regis, Harrow and Oxford.

He married his wife, Marian, on 15 August 1946. Their children were Sally Hayter Rootes and Nicholas Geoffrey Rootes, the 3rd Baron Rootes.

== Arms ==
Coat of arms of William Geoffrey Rootes
Crest On a wreath Argent and Vert a cubit arm bendwise in armour Or the hand Proper grasping a spear in bend also Proper flying therefrom a forked pennon barry Argent and Azure semée of plates and bezants. Escutcheon Ermine within an orle Azure a bugle horn sable garnished Or stringed Gules. Supporters On either side a horse argent gorged with a chain pendant therefrom a wheel Or. Motto Prorsum In Futurum (Forward Into The Future) Badge A horse's head erased Argent gorged with a riband Gules pendant therefrom by a riband Azure a bugle horn Sable garnished Or.

Peerage of the United Kingdom
Preceded by William Rootes	Baron Rootes; 1964–1992	Succeeded by Nicholas Rootes
