= Rootes Group =

British automobile manufacturer

Rootes Motors Limited
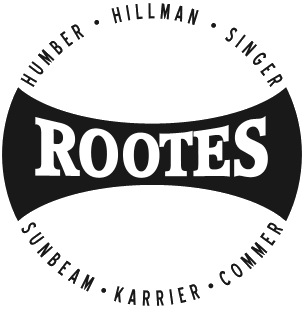

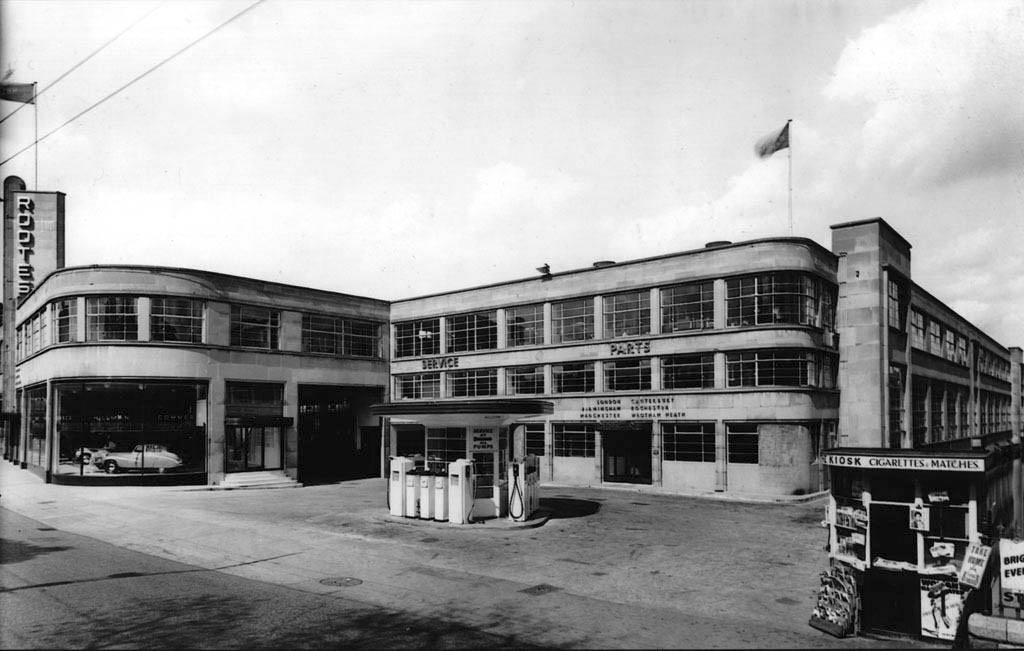
- The Rootes Maidstone on Mill Street, Rootes' factory building c. 1948
- Type: Limited
- Industry: Automotive
- Founded: 1913
- Founder: William Rootes; Reginald Rootes
- Defunct: 30 June 1970
- Fate: Acquired by Chrysler
- Headquarters: London, England
- Number of locations: London, Ryton, Linwood,
- Area served: Global
- Products: Automobiles, commercial vehicles
- Subsidiaries: Humber (60%, 1931–1967); Commer (1931–1967); Hillman (1931–1967); Karrier (1934–1970); Singer (1956–1970); Sunbeam (1935–1967); Talbot (1935–1967)

The Rootes Group was a British automobile manufacturer and, separately, a major motor distributors and dealers business. From headquarters in the West End of London, the manufacturer was based in the Midlands and the distribution and dealers business in the south of England.

In the decade 1928–1938, brothers William and Reginald Rootes, made prosperous by their very successful motor car distribution and servicing business, were keen to enter manufacturing for closer control of the products they were selling. With the financial support of Prudential Assurance, the two brothers bought many well-known British motor manufacturers—including Hillman, Humber, Singer, Sunbeam, Talbot, Commer and Karrier. At its height in 1960, Rootes Group had manufacturing plants in the Midlands at Coventry and Birmingham, in southern England at Acton, Luton and Dunstable, and a brand-new plant in the west of Scotland at Linwood. From its offices in Devonshire House on Piccadilly in central London, it controlled exports and international distribution for Rootes and other motor manufacturers, as well as its own local distribution and service operations in London, Kent, Birmingham and Manchester. There were assembly plants in nine countries outside the UK.

Rootes Group was under-capitalised in its last years and unable to survive industrial relations problems at its facilities and losses from the 1963 introduction of a new aluminium-engined small car, the Hillman Imp. By mutual agreement, from mid-1964, Rootes Motors was taken over in stages by US auto company Chrysler; it acquired control from the Rootes family by 1967 and refashioned the group as Chrysler United Kingdom. By the end of 1978, the last of the various elements of Chrysler UK had been resold to French automotive group Peugeot SA, which itself subsequently merged with FCA to form Stellantis.

== History ==
=== Dealer and distributor for other manufacturers ===
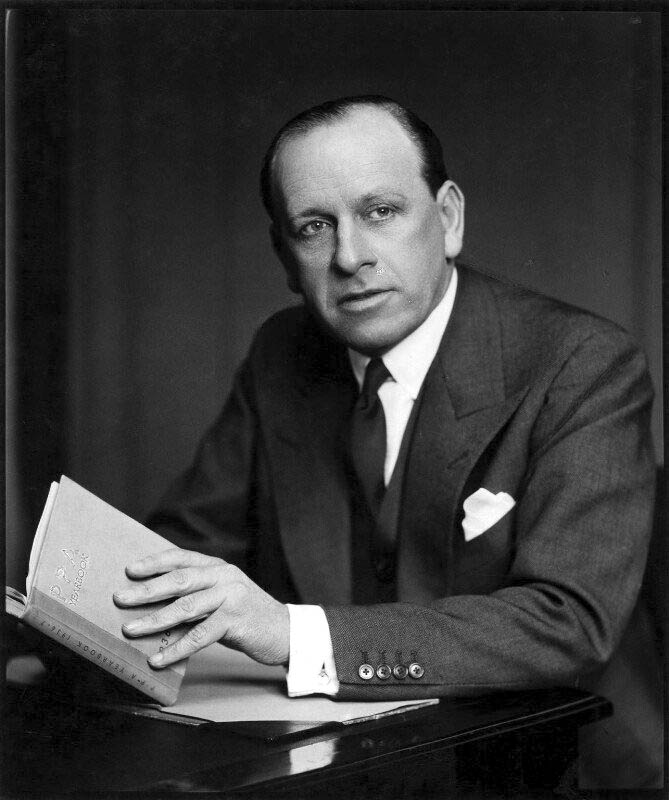
Founder William Rootes

Rootes was founded in Hawkhurst, Kent, in 1913 by William Rootes as a car sales agency independent from his father's Hawkhurst motor business. Rootes had moved his operations to Maidstone by 1914 and there he contracted to repair aero engines. In 1917 he formed Rootes Limited to buy the Maidstone branch of his father's motor business, founded by his father in 1897, to expand his aircraft engine repair business and the manufacture of aircraft parts.

In 1919 the distribution of cars and commercial vehicles resumed and operations extended to London and other part of the country. As early as 1924 Rootes had become the largest truck and car distributor in the United Kingdom. They advertised that their showrooms in Devonshire House, Piccadilly could supply new cars priced from £145 to £3,000 manufactured by Rolls-Royce, Daimler, Sunbeam, Austin, Hillman, Fiat or Clyno.

=== Humber Limited ===
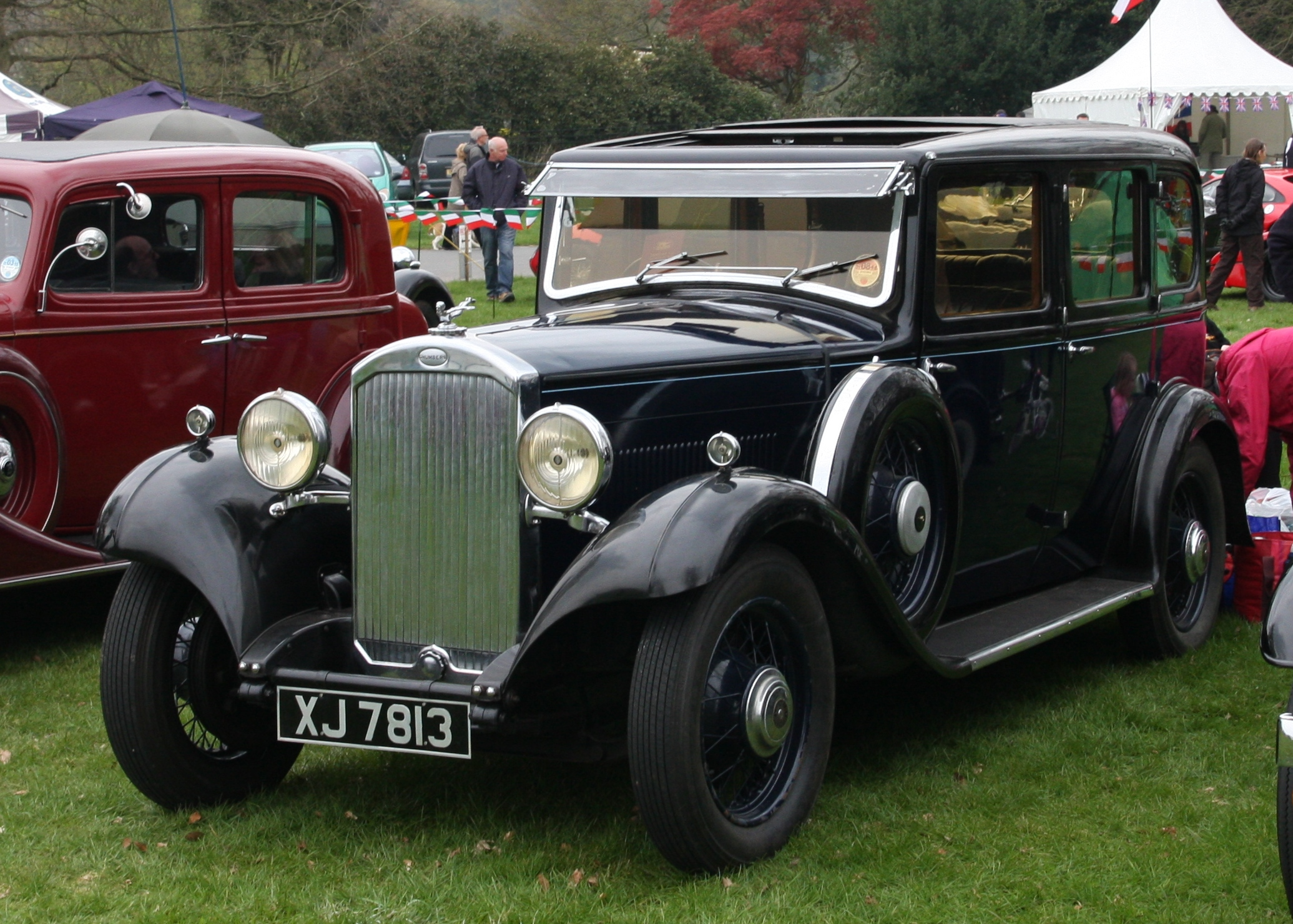
Hillman 14

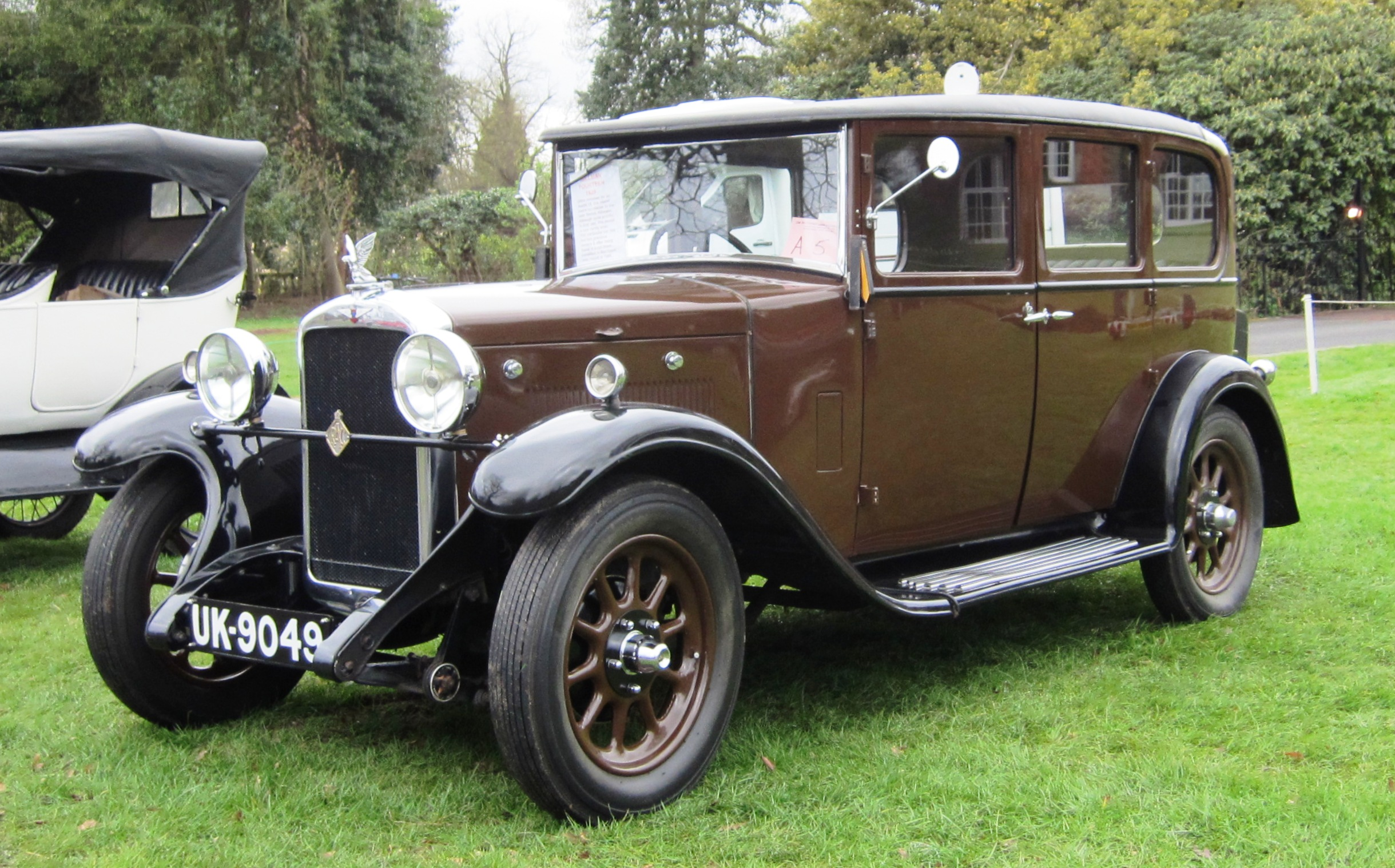
Humber 16–60

A particular effort was put into overseas sales and it became clear the export opportunities warranted a move into car manufacture, which was achieved in 1929 by the purchase of controlling interests in first Hillman followed by Humber and Commer. Hillman and Commer were made wholly owned subsidiaries of Humber Limited and the Rootes brothers' holding eventually became 60 percent of the Humber ordinary shares. The Rootes brothers could now show their ability to manufacture handsome cars with a strong sales appeal.

=== Humber Cycles ===
There was a resurgence in domestic and export demand for pedal bicycles, and in February 1932 Raleigh acquired all the Humber cycles trade marks. Manufacture was transferred to Raleigh's Nottingham works.

=== Rootes Securities Limited ===
Rootes Limited was renamed Rootes Securities Limited in 1933. During the Depression more businesses were picked up as they came available: Karrier (1934), Sunbeam (1934), Clement Talbot (1934) and British Light Steel Pressings (1937) were all bought and made subsidiaries of Humber Limited. London's Mayfair coachbuilders and Rolls-Royce and Daimler dealers Thrupp & Maberly had been bought in 1926 their royal warrant always proudly displayed.

=== Rootes Limited and exports ===
A new Rootes Limited was incorporated in 1933 to hold the core business of the Rootes brothers: the motor distribution and servicing functions, and its extension and development of export markets. It had been the largest truck and car distributor in the United Kingdom in 1924 and generated the capital to buy manufacturer Hillman, merge Hillman with manufacturer Humber and give the Rootes brothers control of Humber and the manufacturing subsidiaries they would have Humber buy.

Overseas representation of British motor manufacturers was not limited to group members.

=== Ownership and control, Rootes family ===
Rootes Motors Limited was the new name assumed 16 November 1949 of holding company Rootes Securities Limited. Substantially the whole of 1917's initial capital had been provided by the two Rootes brothers. Thereafter the business's expansion was financed by retained profits supplemented where necessary, for example the purchase of Hillman, by loans from Prudential and the company's bankers principally Midland Bank. On 24 November 1949 shares in Rootes Motors Limited were issued to the public in exchange for £3,025,000. Rootes was now a public company and the new capital repaid the Prudential and Midland Bank loans. The listed shares however were preference shares. The equity capital remained in the hands of the Rootes family now with new partner Prudential who had taken up all of the offered £1,000,000 of ordinary shares. External shareholders continued to hold a large proportion of Humber Limited. The preference shares issued to the public by Humber remained listed. In addition there were external shareholdings in the Rootes Acceptances vehicle exporting business and in Automobile Products of India.

At this time employees totalled 17,000. Rootes owned, on average, about 80 per cent of the capital of its subsidiaries. The manufacturing subsidiaries were held through partly owned Humber Limited. Manufacture was carried out in three factories in Coventry with more at Luton, Cricklewood and Acton. There was a wholly owned assembly plant in Australia and similar facilities owned with associates in Argentina, Republic of Ireland and India. From Devonshire House in Piccadilly the original business, the marketing subsidiary, directed operations at five branches in Kent, their North Kensington service department and Birmingham and Manchester branches together with distribution companies overseas sometimes jointly owned.

Barely twelve months after listing preference shares the Rootes brothers recognised the effect death duties would have on their holdings and their businesses and the two brothers offered one quarter of Rootes Motors' ordinary shares to current holders of Rootes preference shares. Further issues of preference shares and debenture stock followed in November 1954 and November 1959. Rootes Acceptances Limited, the export financing arm, was sold.

=== World War II ===
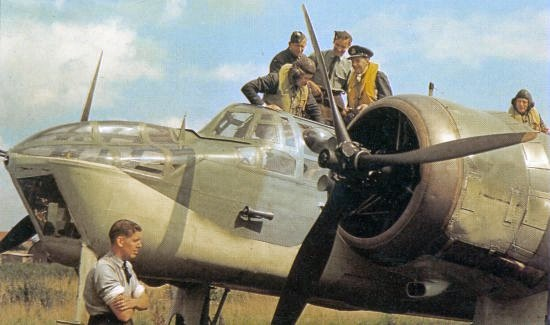
A Bristol Blenheim bomber

With the outbreak of World War II, Rootes, like most other British car manufacturers, became involved with the production of armaments. In 1940, under the Government's shadow factory scheme, Rootes built its massive assembly plant in Ryton-on-Dunsmore, near Coventry, initially manufacturing aircraft, one of the first types being the Bristol Blenheim. Production included a Royal Air Force heavy bomber, the Handley Page Halifax. These were built at a shadow factory at Speke Airport near Liverpool and at Blythe Bridge in Staffordshire from 1941 to 1943. Rootes also manufactured military vehicles, based on the Humber and Commer.

Rootes had a rare lapse of business judgement shortly after World War II. When he visited the Volkswagen factory in Wolfsburg to evaluate it for war reparations, he opined that it – and the Beetle – had no value.

=== Postwar acquisitions ===
Tilling-Stevens with its subsidiary Vulcan Motors, both old-established and well-known commercial vehicle and bus manufacturers, was bought in the second half of 1950. A new acquisition in 1956 was Singer Motors. Rootes' Singers, badge-engineered Hillmans, were aimed at slightly more upmarket small car buyers.

=== Post-war development ===
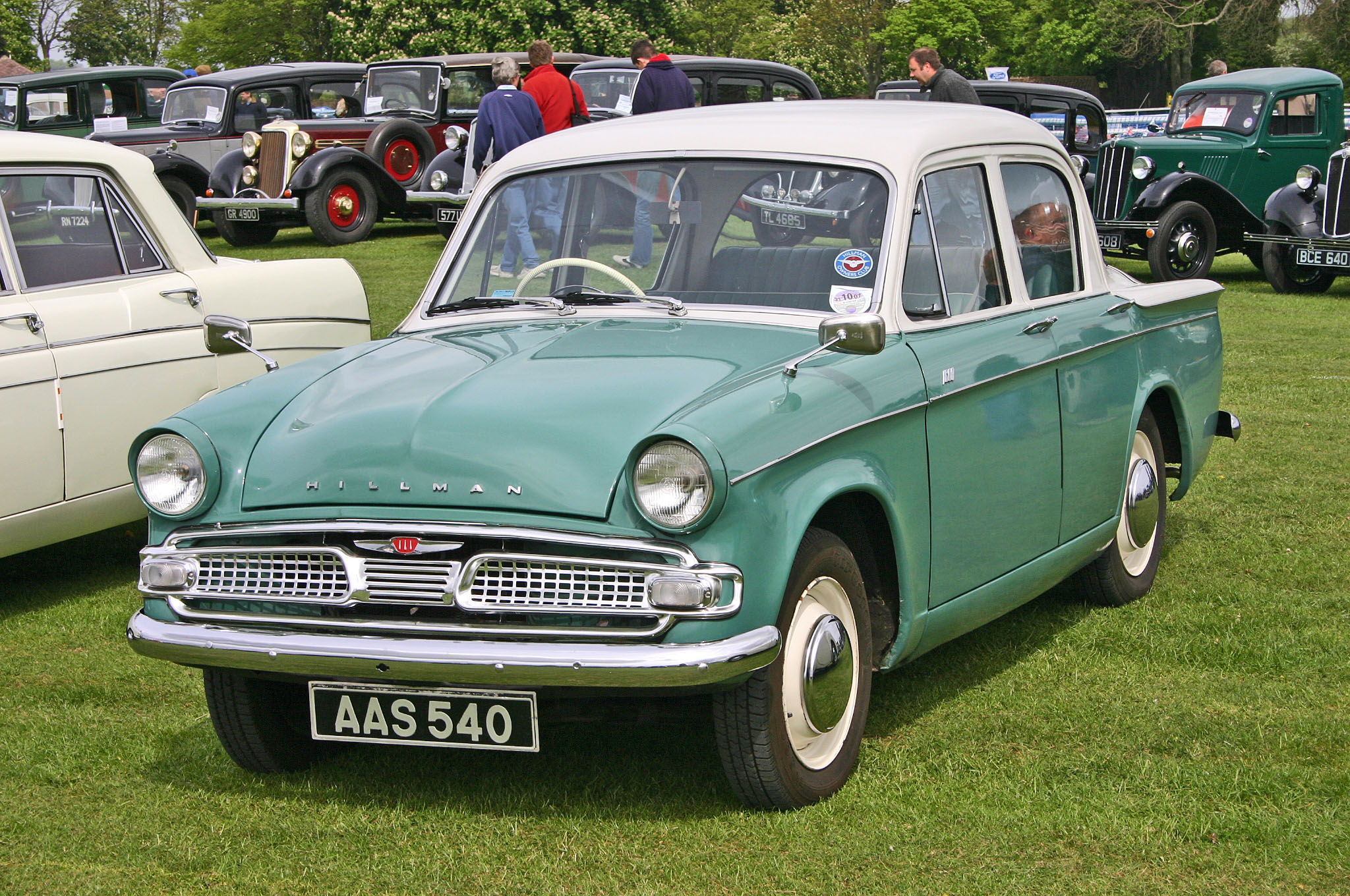
Hillman Minx Series IIIC

Following the war, Rootes also sponsored satellite manufacturing operations around the world, notably in Australasia (Rootes Australia) and the Middle East. The best known example of the latter was the Iranian-built Paykan, based on the Hillman Hunter. In 1950 it acquired Tilling-Stevens, a truck and bus manufacturer based in Maidstone, Kent.

Rootes successfully sold a range of cars priced at a slight premium to their major home market competitors, justified on the basis that they offered a level of superiority in design and finish.

Studebaker stylist Raymond Loewy was a design consultant to Rootes; evidence of his influence is most readily seen in the 1956 Audax range of cars, which included the contemporary Hillman Minx, a model also produced under licence by Isuzu of Japan as the Isuzu Hillman Minx.

=== Engineering innovation ===
Rootes introduced a novel supercharged diesel engine in 1954, based on a Sulzer Brothers concept. This was the Commer TS3 2-stroke 3-cylinder engine, with 2 opposed inward facing pistons per cylinder, which drove the crankshaft through bell cranks. The 3.25 litre engine developed 90 hp (67 kW), equivalent to contemporary 4-stroke diesel engines of more than twice the capacity.

The engine was used in Commer trucks as well as an industrial engine. Production ceased in 1968 after the Chrysler takeover.

=== Range rationalisation ===
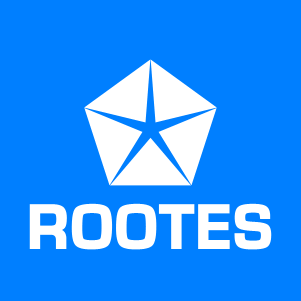
Rootes Group logo after Chrysler takeover. This logo was used until June 1970, when Rootes was replaced by Chrysler

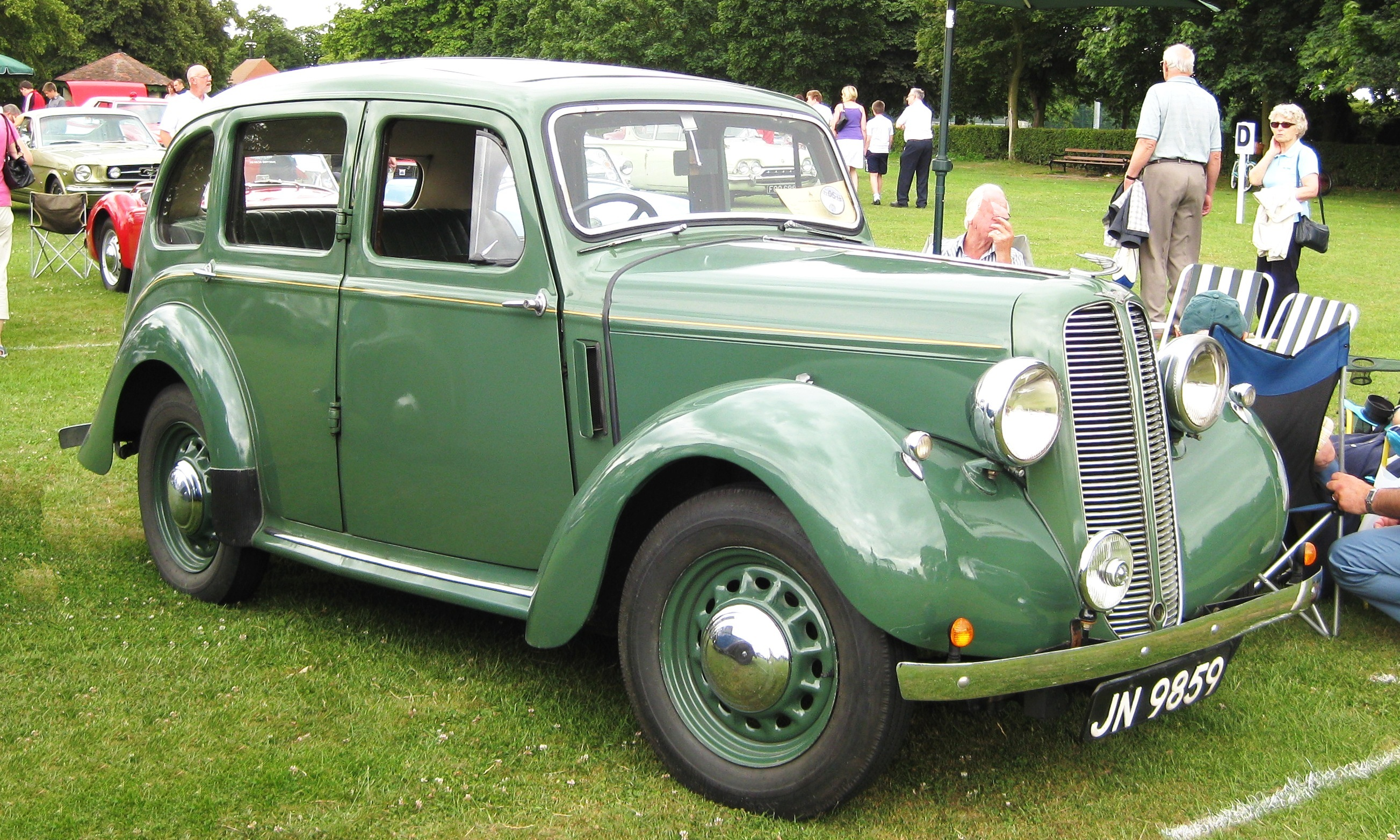
Hillman Minx Magnificent, 1937

Hillman when purchased had been making large cars. They introduced a straight-eight soon after Hillman became a subsidiary, but it was withdrawn as the Depression deepened. Their 2-1/2 and 3-litre cars were re-styled in the mid-1930s and renamed Humber Snipe and their small Minx was made the mainstay bread and butter member of the Rootes range. Sunbeam continued its sports appeal but downsizing postwar to small to medium-sized cars. Humber made the larger luxury passenger vehicles, Snipes and variants, and luxury mid-size cars ending with the compact Sceptre. The intervening break in medium-sized Humbers was filled by the postwar Sunbeams. Commer and Karrier were the commercial vehicle brands. Commer manufactured a full range of vans, trucks, tractors and bus chassis, and some badge-engineered small vehicles from the Hillman range. Karrier represented mainly municipal and special-purpose trucks, vans and buses, though towards the end included badge-engineered models from the Commer range.

=== Sunbeam Tiger ===
During the 1960s, Sunbeam's Alpine convertible was moderately successful in the US market. Rootes considered that the Alpine's sales would be improved with a more powerful model. As a result, in 1964 they introduced the Tiger, a V8 derivative powered by a 260 cu in (4,261 cm^{3}) Ford V8 engine. Carroll Shelby was involved in the development of the Tiger prototype.

A 289 cu in (4,736 cm^{3}) model followed in 1967, but few were built as it was considered inappropriate for a Chrysler vehicle to be powered by Ford. Consideration was given to installing a Chrysler V8 in the Tiger, but their engines were larger and heavier than the Ford engines, and the rear-mounted distributor would have required an unaffordable chassis design, given the limited sales.

=== Hillman Imp and the move to Linwood ===
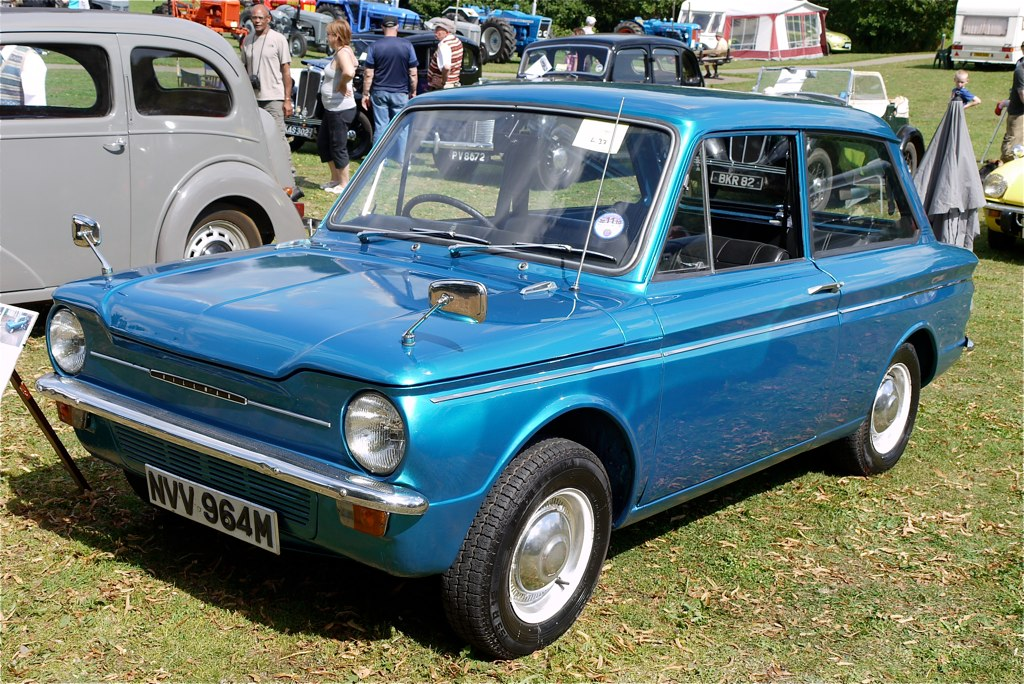
The rear-engine Hillman Imp never caught on with the buying public.

In 1963, Rootes introduced the Hillman Imp, a compact rear-engined saloon with an innovative all-aluminium OHC engine, based on a Coventry Climax engine design (originally used for a fire pump). It was intended to be a response from Rootes to rival British Motor Corporation's popular Mini, and a new factory (called the Linwood plant) on the boundary between Paisley and Elderslie, Renfrewshire was built for its assembly. The move to Linwood was forced upon the company by the British government, which had introduced the principle of industrial development certificates (IDCs) to build factories in depressed areas. The Linwood workforce had no experience in motor vehicle assembly and the build quality and reliability of the cars suffered. Another problem was that the component suppliers were still based in the Midlands, and the company incurred costs transporting half-finished engine castings from Linwood to be machined at Ryton and returned to Linwood once they had been assembled. Completed Imps returned south to Ryton, resulting in a 600-mile (970 km) round trip.

The Imp itself was underdeveloped, and the build quality and reliability problems, coupled with buyer apathy towards the design were reflected in poor sales. After a reasonably successful start in 1963–65, the Imp did not sell well. Lost production caused by frequent strike action at Linwood and escalating warranty claims left Rootes no money to develop other models.

=== Competition history ===
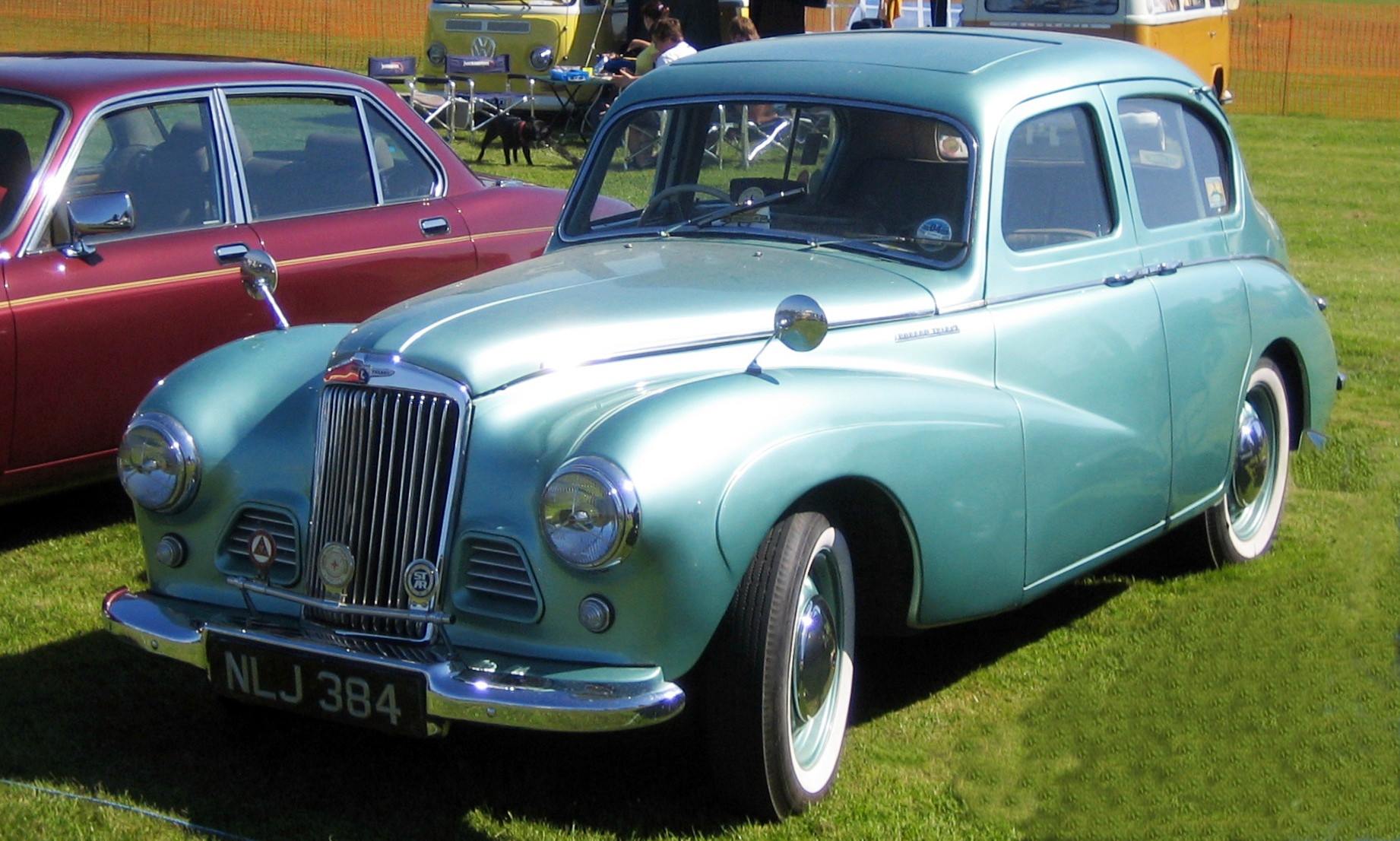
A Sunbeam-Talbot 90 won the Monte Carlo Rally in 1955

During the 1950s, Rootes's promotion included a strategy of participation in major UK and European car rallies. Stirling Moss and Sheila van Damm were their top drivers, and the Sunbeam-Talbot 90's win in the 1955 Monte Carlo Rally was the most significant victory.

In 1968, Rootes entered a factory team in the London-Sydney Marathon. Driving a Hillman Hunter, Andrew Cowan gained what was regarded as a surprise victory against stiff competition from other factory teams with bigger budgets.

=== Business strategy ===
William Rootes' particular business skills were in marketing. Rootes brothers' manufacturing business was best known for solid, dependable, well-engineered middle-market vehicles always of attractive appearance. Well-known Rootes models include the Hillman Minx, its successor the Hillman Hunter, the Humber Super Snipe and the Sunbeam Alpine.

William Rootes built the Rootes Group using specific brands for each market niche.

=== Management succession ===
Following the death in 1964 of Lord Rootes, his son, William Geoffrey Rootes, became the second Lord Rootes and became the new chairman of Rootes Motors. On 1 May 1967 Lord Rootes appointed Gilbert Hunt, a Wolverhampton-born business executive, who at the time was managing director of Massey Ferguson in the UK, to be the new managing director of the Rootes Group. Hunt's appointment was made with the support of Chrysler, which was building its holding and control over the business during this period.

== Rootes' successors ==
=== Chrysler (1967–1978) ===
In June 1964 Rootes Motors announced Chrysler would take a 30 per cent interest in their ordinary capital offering current shareholders double the market price and a 50 per cent share in the non-voting preference capital for almost three times market price. The purchase would leave control in British hands. On completion Rootes family holdings would still exceed those of Chrysler. The purchase was completed in October 1964. During 1966 the holdings were increased to 45 per cent of the ordinary shares and 65 per cent of the non-voting shares and in January 1967 holdings were increased to about two-thirds of Rootes Motors capital. It was renamed Chrysler UK on 30 June 1970.

It has been suggested that the demise of Rootes began with losses due to industrial relations problems at their BLSP plant in London, with knock-on problems down the supply chain. By the mid-1960s, Rootes was progressively taken over by Chrysler of the United States, following huge losses amid the commercial failure of the troubled Imp. The company's financial year ran to 31 July, and in the year ended 31 July 1967 Rootes was able to report a pre-tax profit of just £3.8 million. It was the first reported profit since 1964 and compared with a pretax loss of £10.7 million in the year ending in 1966. Lack of funds for new model investment was a striking feature of the company's final decade.

Chrysler was also keen to take control of the struggling firm as it wished to have its own wholly independent European subsidiaries like archrivals Ford and General Motors. Chrysler took over Simca of France and Barreiros of Spain at the same time, merging it with Rootes to create Chrysler Europe. In 1970, the Rootes name was replaced by Chrysler United Kingdom (correspondingly the French arm Simca was renamed Chrysler France at the same time), and subsequently disappeared from the public sphere. The various Rootes marques were progressively phased out during the 1970s. Only Hillman was left by 1977, when it, too, was shelved in favour of the Chrysler name. The Commer name was also phased out in the 1970s; the van and truck models mostly assuming the Dodge nameplate by 1976.

In Iacocca—an Autobiography, former Chrysler chairman Lee Iacocca was disparaging of the Rootes operation, writing that Chrysler should never have bought it. Chrysler UK continued with a range of rear-wheel-drive family cars such as the Hillman Avenger (introduced in 1970) and Hillman Hunter (introduced in 1966), while the Imp — which by now had most of its teething problems ironed out — was largely ignored by the new management. The Imp's commercial chances were not helped by the launch of new imports in the early 1970s including the Fiat 127 and Renault 5, which not only showed that front engined, front wheel drive hatchbacks would become the industry standard format in the entry level market segment, but spearheaded an influx of popular imports.

In the late 1960s, Chrysler endeavoured to market the Rootes cars in the US. These efforts proved unsuccessful. Marketing in the US was impeded by an inability to offer cars for sale during part of 1968, as the Rootes cars could not comply with exhaust emission requirements.

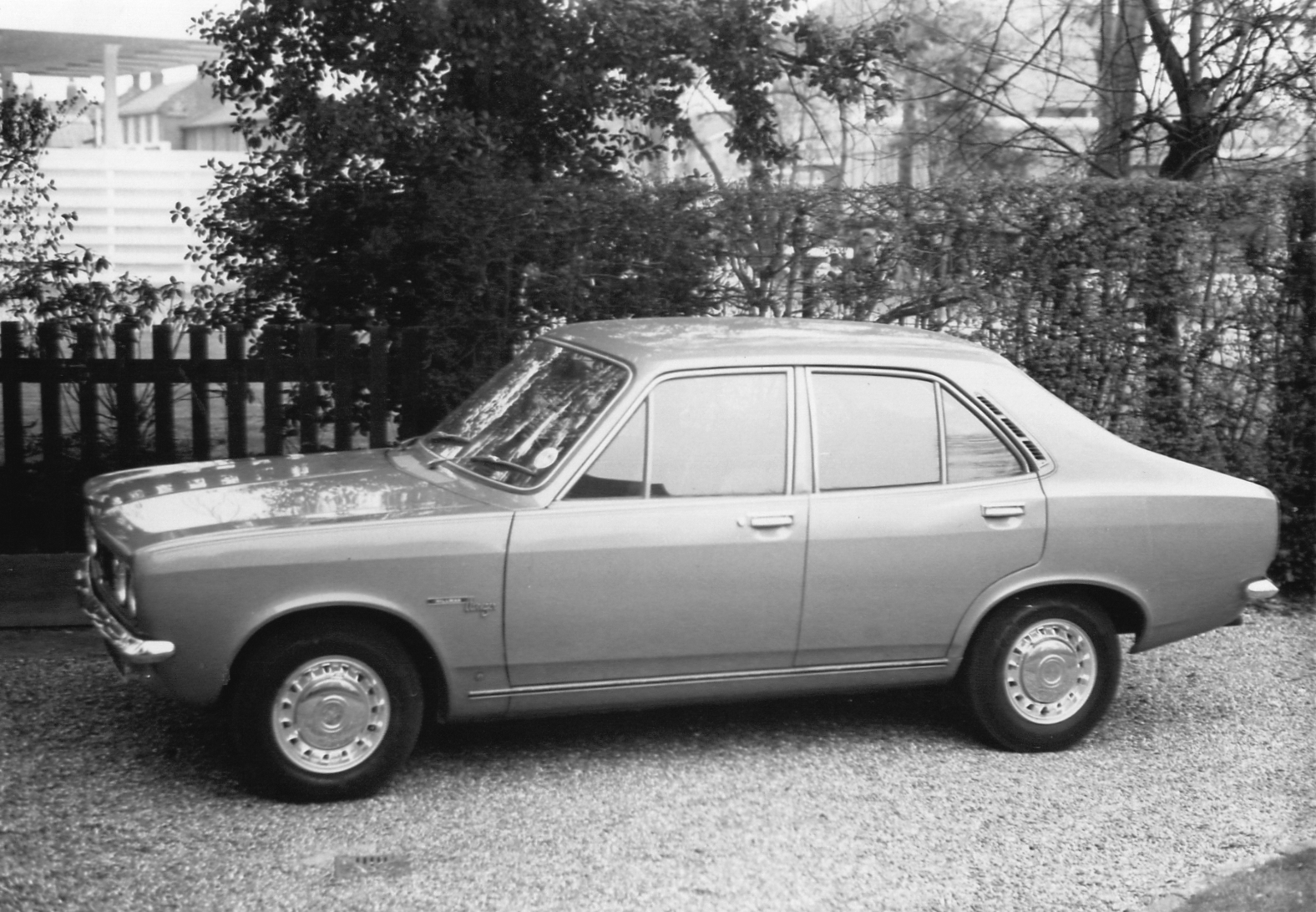
The Hillman Avenger was produced between 1970 and 1981

In the early 1970s, with the rise of interest in sub-compact cars, Chrysler offered the Hillman Avenger in North America as the Plymouth Cricket. This attempt was aborted after only two years. At the same time, Chrysler's Dodge Division offered the Dodge Colt as its subcompact, sourced from Mitsubishi in Japan. The Colt proved a popular and reliable car, hastening the Cricket's demise.

However, Chrysler Fevre Argentina commenced manufacturing the Hillman Avenger-based Dodge 1500, and this car continued in production until 1990. During its last 10 years of production it was badged as a Volkswagen after that firm acquired Chrysler's Argentine business. There was also a Brazilian variant until 1980.

By the early 1970s, Chrysler Europe was working on the development of two new family car ranges which would be produced at both its British and French plants, and sold under both the Chrysler and Simca marques on the relevant markets - similar to the integration of British and German model ranges which its rivals Ford and General Motors were carrying out at the time.

The Chrysler Alpine (sold in France as the Simca 1307/1308) was introduced in 1975, being produced at the former Rootes plant at Ryton as well as the former Simca plant at Poissy, near Paris. The Chrysler Sunbeam a three-door hatchback based on the Avenger floorpan, was introduced in 1977 as successor to the Hillman Imp. Also, Chrysler UK made a significant contribution to the design of Chrysler's European range. As well as the Alpine and Sunbeam, there was the saloon derivative of the Alpine, the Talbot Solara (launched in early 1980 after Chrysler sold its European operations to Peugeot), and Chrysler/Simca Horizon. The Alpine and Horizon were both voted European Car of the Year on their launch, and the Horizon was the basis for the US Plymouth Horizon and Dodge Omni, which were very successful for Chrysler and continued in production in various guises for more than a decade.

The Imp was finally discontinued in 1976, and the Hunter followed it three years later (although it continued to be produced in Iran). Indeed, componentry for the Iranian version of the car was a successful UK export during the 1980s.

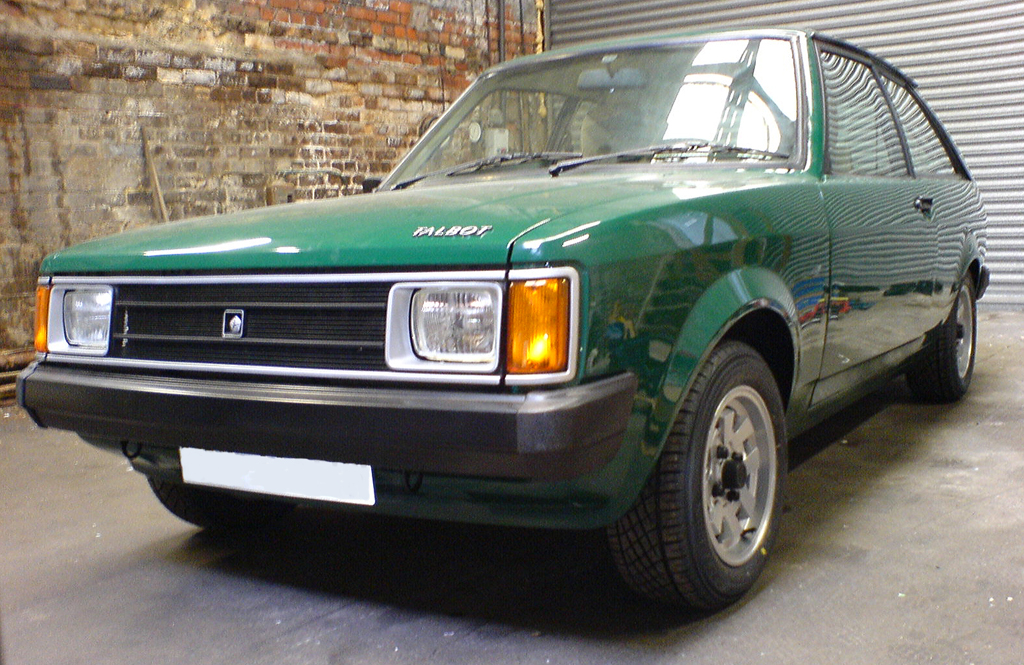
The Chrysler Sunbeam kept the company going in the later 1970s

Only the Avenger-based Chrysler Sunbeam hatchback, launched in 1977 kept the Rootes lineage alive, although the Alpine name was still in use and later Alpine and Solara special edition models were given the old Rootes model names, Minx and Rapier. The rights to the Rapier name remained with the successors of the company, and were eventually resurrected again on a few limited edition Peugeot models. There was also a special Sceptre edition of the 205, 405 and the 605 SRi models. This used a black plastic badge with the chrome effect Sceptre cursive script similar to that on the sideflashes of the '60s saloons. In the case of the Peugeot cars, the Sceptre badging was applied to the bootlid and lower aft part of the front wing.

Chrysler had spent much of the 1970s unsuccessfully trying to integrate its Rootes and Simca ranges into one, coherent whole. The traditionally engineered, rear-wheel-drive cars of the British division had limited appeal outside the UK, although the Avenger and Hunter—the first locally assembled car to reach a total of 30,000 units sold in its 12-year lifespan—were both relatively successful in New Zealand. Hunter production continued there and in Ireland until 1979, and it was built in Iran by Iran Khodro as the Paykan for many years more.

Unfortunately, with its problems in the US, Chrysler did not have the capital to invest in refreshing their entire product range, and sales of the older designs stagnated in the face of more modern competition. Also, the production facilities were outmoded, industrial relations problems were persistent, and the products had a poor reputation for quality.

In the face of massive losses, and the risk of high unemployment in the surrounding areas if the factories closed, the Ryton and Linwood factories were the subject of frequent government bail-outs.

=== Peugeot-Talbot (1978–2007) ===
Despite the government assistance, the weight of problems bearing on Chrysler Europe resulted in its collapse in 1977, leading to the company's 1978 takeover by PSA Peugeot-Citroen. PSA soon closed the troubled Linwood factory in Scotland, and revived the Talbot marque from Rootes' history to re-badge the former Chrysler and Simca badged models. Whilst Ryton was saved, PSA took little interest in the heavy commercial vehicles and the former Commer/Dodge/Karrier truck and van factory was run in conjunction with the trucks division of Renault. After the withdrawal of the last Dodge-derived trucks (latterly badged as Renaults) it became an engine production plant for Renault Véhicules Industriels.

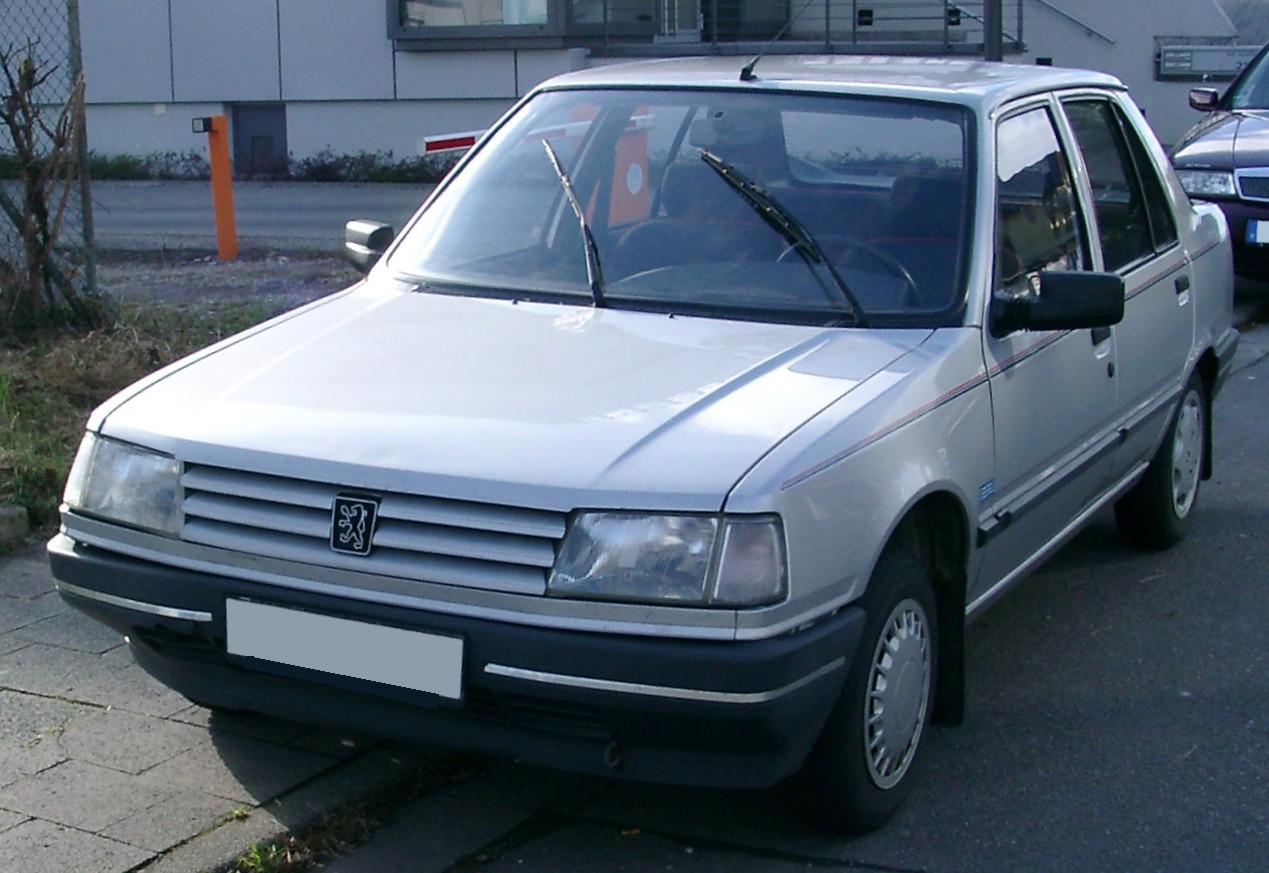
The Peugeot 309 was the first Peugeot assembled at the Ryton plant

The first Rootes model to be discontinued under Peugeot's ownership was the Hunter in 1979, and its production tooling subsequently went to Iran, where the Paykan went into local production, which continued until 2004. It remains a common sight throughout the Middle East, especially as a taxi. The closure of Linwood in 1981 spelled the end (in Europe at least) for the Avenger. Chrysler had retained the rights to the car, and continued its production in Argentina. The demise of Linwood also meant the demise of the Talbot Sunbeam after just four years in production. Its successor was the French built Talbot Samba, based on the Peugeot 104, and which went on sale in the UK in February 1982. By this stage, however, Peugeot was a year away from unveiling its highly acclaimed new 205 supermini, although it was originally planned that Peugeot would launch a Talbot badged supermini on the 205 platform as well as a Citroen some time around the mid-1980s.

The Simca-based models (the Horizon, Alpine and Solara) continued to be built at Ryton, using the resurrected Talbot badge from 1979. However, the Talbot-badged models declined in popularity over the next few years, with sales dropping from nearly 120,000 on the UK market in 1979 to around 25,000 in 1984, while at the same time the Peugeot brand was gaining ground thanks to the success of the 205.

By 1985 PSA had announced that it would abandon the three-marque strategy on passenger cars, and the Horizon replacement, developed as the Talbot Arizona, became the Peugeot 309 when it was launched in the autumn of 1985, and was the first Peugeot-badged car to be assembled at the Ryton plant. The Arizona's styling was mismatched with the rest of the range, making it resemble an enlarged Simca 1108. The Talbot badge was discontinued on passenger cars, with the Alpine, Solara and Samba all finishing production in May 1986, and the last Horizon models leaving the production lines in Spain and Finland a year later. The Talbot brand survived on the Express van - part of a venture between Peugeot and Fiat - until 1994.

The Ryton plant was initially retained and went on to assemble the Peugeot 405 alongside the 309 from 1987, as well as the 309's successor (the Peugeot 306) from late 1992, and finally the Peugeot 206 from 1998.

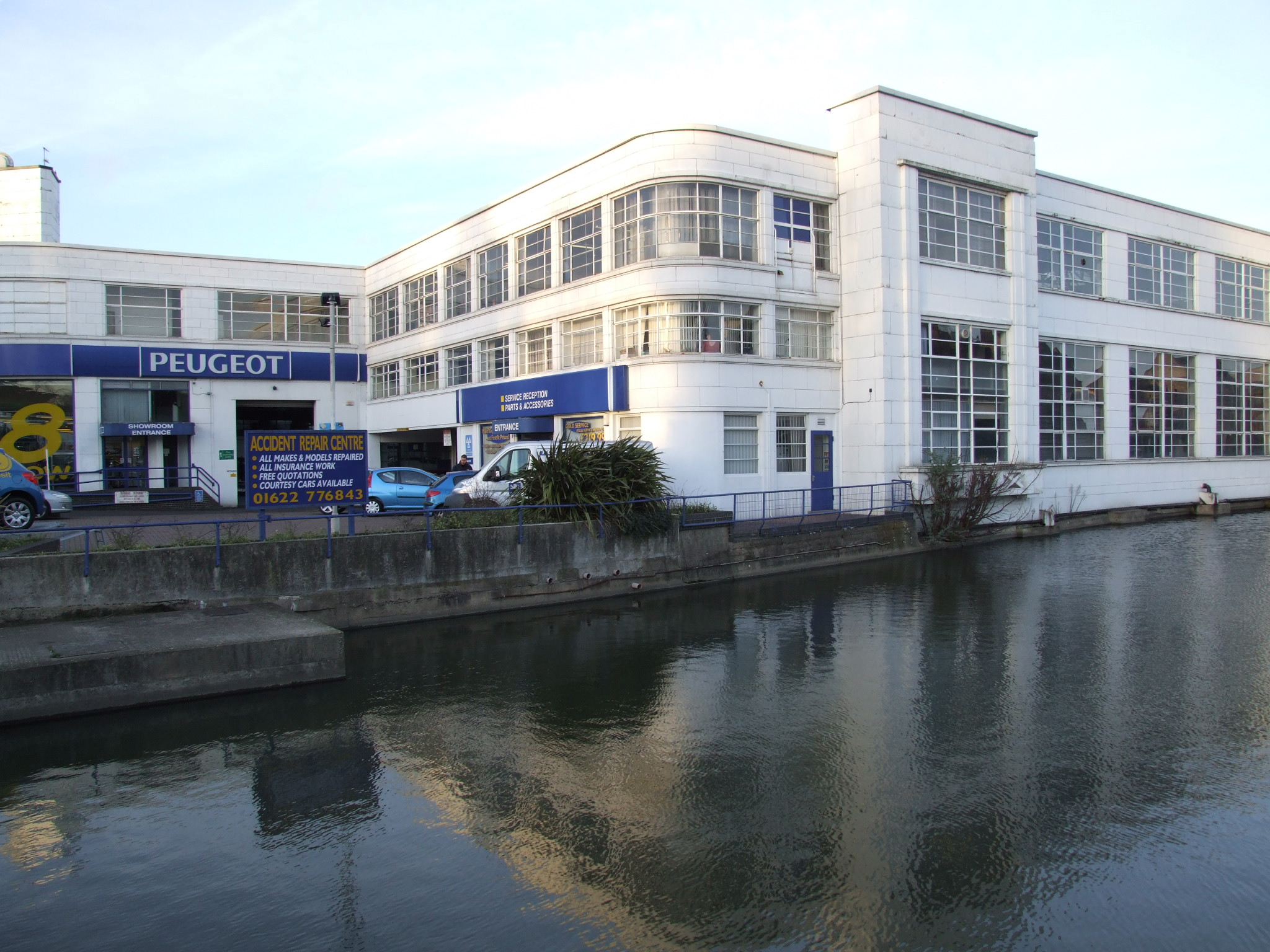
Former Rootes building in Maidstone as a Peugeot repair centre and showroom in the 2000s

Ryton began assembling its last Peugeot, the 206, in 1998. At the height of the car's success, the plant was working at capacity to satisfy demand. Ryton's importance in PSA's overall strategy was as an assembly operation with limited production capacity compared to PSA's main factories in France and Spain - particularly as its location between two main roads made expansion impossible.

In April 2006, after years of speculation surrounding Ryton's future, the PSA Group announced that production of the Peugeot 206 would be shifted to Slovakia and the Ryton plant would close within the next year.

Production at the plant ceased on 12 December 2006. It marked the end of nearly 60 years of car manufacturing at Ryton, and severed the motor industry's final remaining direct link with the Rootes Group. More than 2,000 jobs were lost as a result of the factory's closure. It was demolished soon after. The only physical remnant of the Rootes Group still in existence is the Whitley research and development centre - originally established during the Chrysler era, but subsequently sold by PSA and is now owned by Jaguar Land Rover.

The intellectual property owned by the former Rootes Group (including dormant marque and model names) was divided up between Chrysler and PSA Peugeot-Citroën following the divestment of the company's assets in 1978; and still appear from time to time on both companies' products - for example Peugeot has used the names Minx, Rapier and Sceptre on various occasions, and on one occasion considered a second resurrection of the Talbot marque as a new budget brand - whilst Chrysler has reused the Avenger nameplate on the Dodge Avenger, and more recently on the Jeep Avenger in 2023.

In 2021 the successors of both conglomerates, namely Fiat Chrysler Automobiles, and PSA Group merged to form Stellantis - effectively bringing together the surviving fragments of the Rootes Group back under one umbrella.

== Commemorations ==
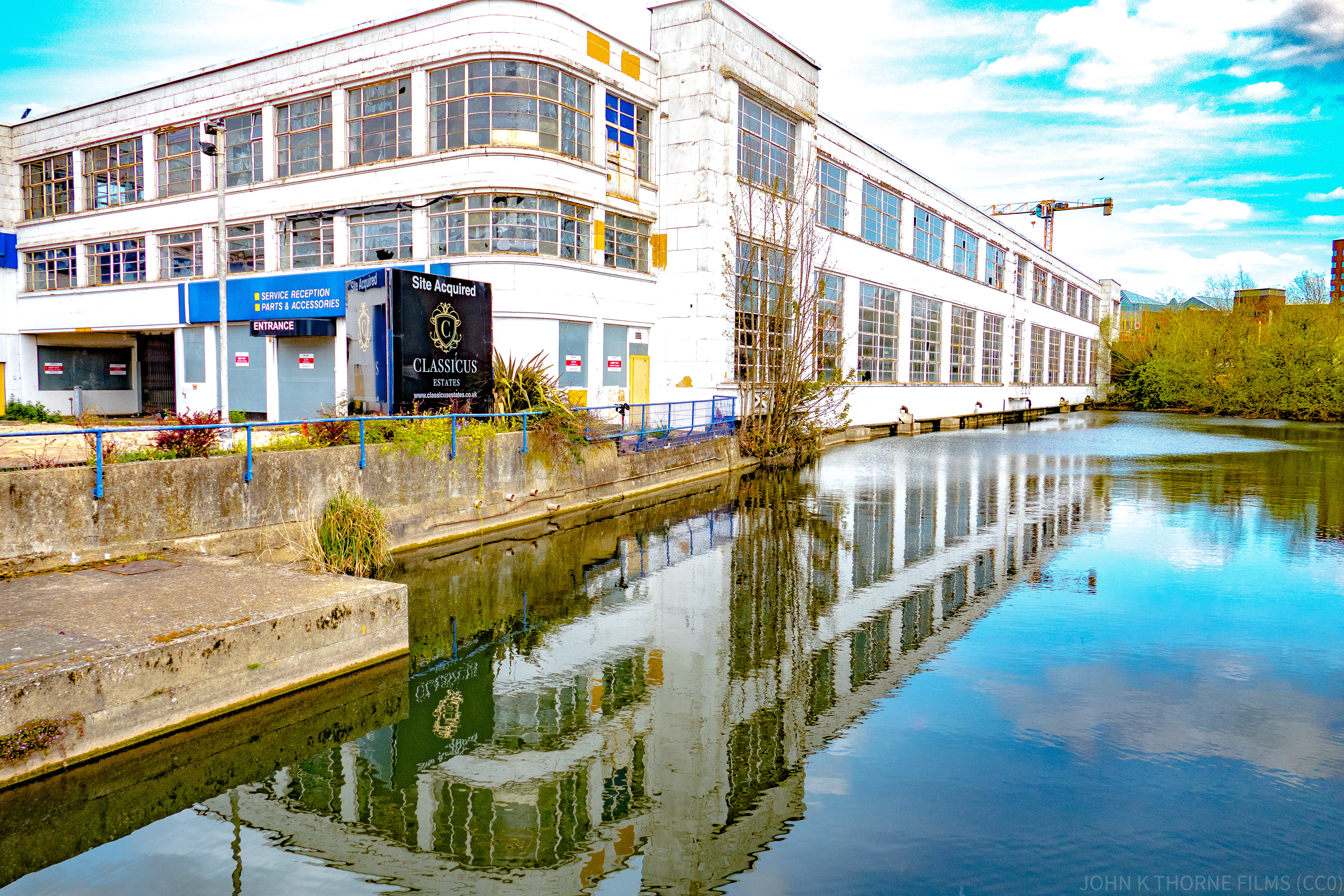
The Rootes Maidstone on Mill Street in 2022

Maidstone, where William Rootes set up his business in 1914, kept the Rootes name on its building until 2007. Built in 1938-39 for Rootes it is listed Grade II. (Note: "The Rootes car showroom and workshops, Mill Street, Maidstone, is designated at Grade II for the following principal reasons: * The building is of architectural interest as an example of a Modernist motorcar showroom and workshops which retains a significant proportion of its original fabric. * The building is of architectural interest due to its grand scale, town-centre location and picturesque setting adjacent to the Len mill pond, which distinguishes it from other buildings associated with the motorcar industry during this phase of early motoring. * The building is a prominent manifestation of a hugely successful British car manufacturer, built in a period when the expansion of car ownership was having a revolutionary impact on the physical and social fabric of the nation." Historic England accessed 26 April 2019) On 1 January 2007, in line with the other 40 dealerships within its business group, the name was changed from Rootes Maidstone, to Robins & Day Maidstone. Robins & Day is wholly owned and operated by Peugeot UK, as opposed to many car dealerships which are franchises. As of April 2020 it is being converted into luxury penthouses and will be completed in 2024.

Rootes' contribution to Coventry's history is commemorated by the University of Warwick in the naming of Rootes Hall, one of its largest halls of residence, on the main campus site on the outskirts of Coventry.

The name lives on in the short access to the Rootes Estate, a housing estate built in the early 1990s on most of the Ladbroke Grove site of the Clément-Talbot car factory. The main access to the redevelopment, Shrewsbury Street, is named after the founder of Clément-Talbot, Charles Chetwynd-Talbot, 20th Earl of Shrewsbury. Soon after the Second World War the group of Clément-Talbot factory buildings was converted to a Rootes Group London administration and service depot which was later bought by Warwick Wright. One of the original buildings remains, the Talbot administration block now known as Ladbroke Hall, with the earl's crest high above its main entrance. A tenant, Sunbeam studios, is named after the Sunbeam-Talbot car briefly produced there from 1938 to 1939 and 1945 to 1946. In the housing area there are short links one named Humber Drive and a Hillman Drive each side of a small park and there is a Sunbeam Crescent.
