= Brunsden Lock =

Canal lock in Berkshire, England

Coordinates: 51.40621°N 1.46657°W

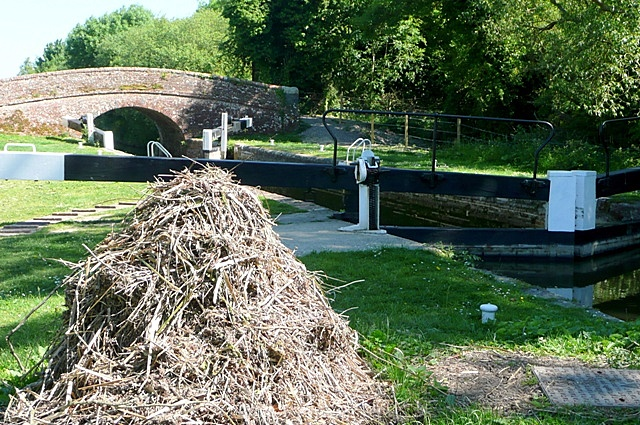
Brunsden Lock

Brunsdon Lock is a lock on the Kennet and Avon Canal, near Kintbury, Berkshire, England.

The lock has a rise/fall of 4 ft 11 in (1.5 m). The Lock is also known as Brunsden Lock and was the site of a coal and grain merchant's business called Brunsdens for many years.

It is a grade II listed building.

== See also ==
- Locks on the Kennet and Avon Canal

Next lock upstream	Kennet and Avon Canal	Next lock downstream
Wire Lock	Brunsden Lock; Grid reference: SU372676	Kintbury Lock
