= River Thames =

River in southern England

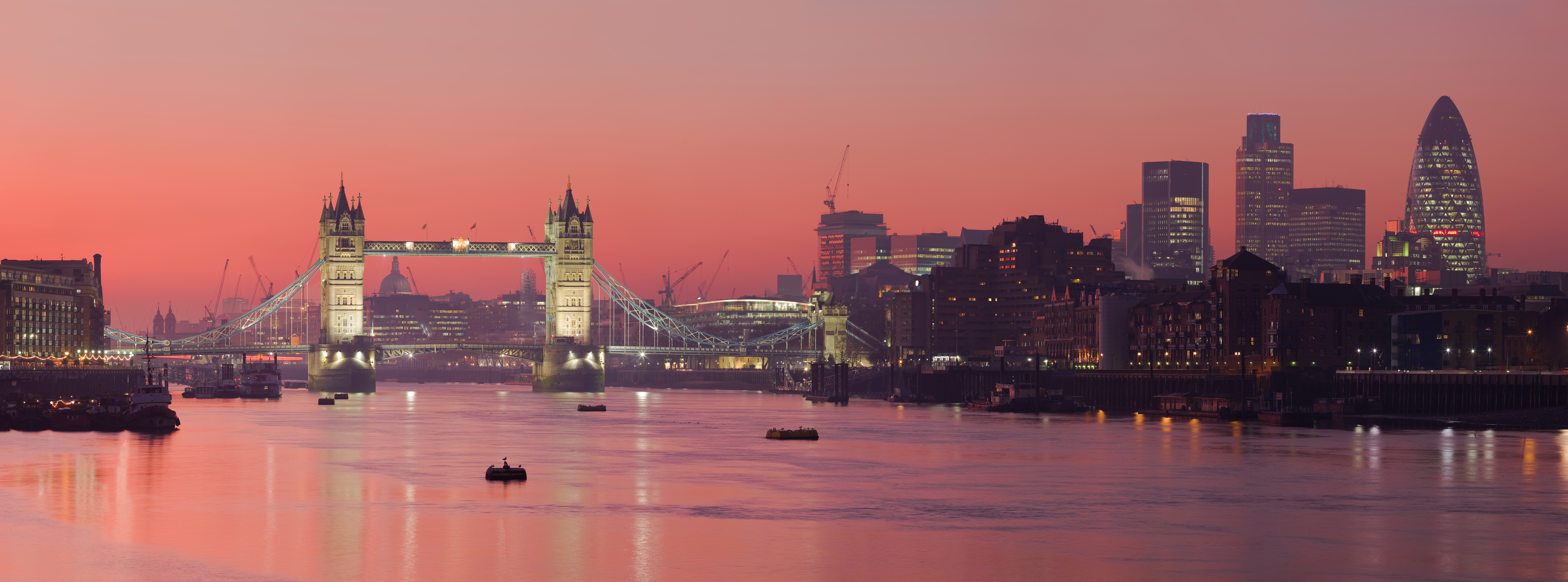
- Panorama of the River Thames, Tower Bridge and the City of London
- Etymology: Proto-Celtic *tamēssa, possibly meaning "dark"

Location
- Country: England
- Counties: Gloucestershire, Wiltshire, Oxfordshire, Berkshire, Buckinghamshire, Surrey, Greater London, Kent, Essex
- Towns/cities: Cricklade, Lechlade, Oxford, Abingdon, Wallingford, Reading, Henley-on-Thames, Marlow, Maidenhead, Windsor, Staines-upon-Thames, Walton-on-Thames, Sunbury-on-Thames, Kingston upon Thames, London (inc. Twickenham, the City), Dagenham, Erith, Dartford, Grays, Gravesend

Physical characteristics
- Source
  - location: Thames Head, Gloucestershire, UK
  - coordinates: 51°41′40″N 02°01′47″W
  - elevation: 110 m (360 ft)
- 2nd source
  - location: Ullenwood, Gloucestershire, UK
  - coordinates: 51°50′49″N 02°04′41″W
  - elevation: 214 m (702 ft)
- Mouth: Thames Estuary, North Sea
  - location: Southend-on-Sea, Essex, UK
  - coordinates: 51°30′00″N 00°36′36″E
  - elevation: 0 m (0 ft)
- Length: 215 mi (346 km)
- Basin size: 12,935 km^{2} (4,994 sq mi)
- Discharge
  - location: London
  - average: 65.8 m^{3}/s (2,320 cu ft/s)
  - maximum: 370 m^{3}/s (13,000 cu ft/s)
- Discharge
  - location: entering Oxford
  - average: 17.6 m^{3}/s (620 cu ft/s)
- Discharge
  - location: leaving Oxford
  - average: 24.8 m^{3}/s (880 cu ft/s)
- Discharge
  - location: Reading, Berkshire
  - average: 39.7 m^{3}/s (1,400 cu ft/s)
- Discharge
  - location: Windsor
  - average: 59.3 m^{3}/s (2,090 cu ft/s)

Basin features
- Tributaries
  - left: Windrush, Cherwell, Colne, Lea, Roding
  - right: Kennet, Wey, Mole

The River Thames, or simply the Thames (/tɛmz/ TEMZ), known alternatively in parts as the River Isis, is a river that flows through southern England including London. At 215 miles (346 km), it is the longest river entirely in England and the second-longest in the United Kingdom, after the River Severn.

The river rises at Thames Head in Gloucestershire and flows into the North Sea near Tilbury, Essex and Gravesend, Kent, via the Thames Estuary. From the west, it flows through Oxford (where it is sometimes called the Isis), Reading, Henley-on-Thames and Windsor. The Thames also drains the whole of Greater London.

The lower reaches of the river are called the Tideway, derived from its long tidal reach up to Teddington Lock. Its tidal section includes most of its London stretch and has a rise and fall of 23 ft (7 m). From Oxford to the estuary, the Thames drops by 55 metres (180 ft). Running through some of the drier parts of mainland Britain and heavily abstracted for drinking water, the Thames' discharge is low considering its length and breadth: the Severn has a discharge almost twice as large on average despite having a smaller drainage basin. In Scotland, the Tay achieves more than double the Thames' average discharge from a drainage basin that is 60% smaller.

Along its course are 45 navigation locks with accompanying weirs. Its catchment area covers a large part of south-eastern and a small part of western England; the river is fed by at least 50 named tributaries. The river contains over 80 islands. With its waters varying from freshwater to almost seawater, the Thames supports a variety of wildlife and has a number of adjoining Sites of Special Scientific Interest, with the largest being in the North Kent Marshes and covering 20.4 mi^{2} (5,289 ha).

== Name ==
=== Brittonic origin ===
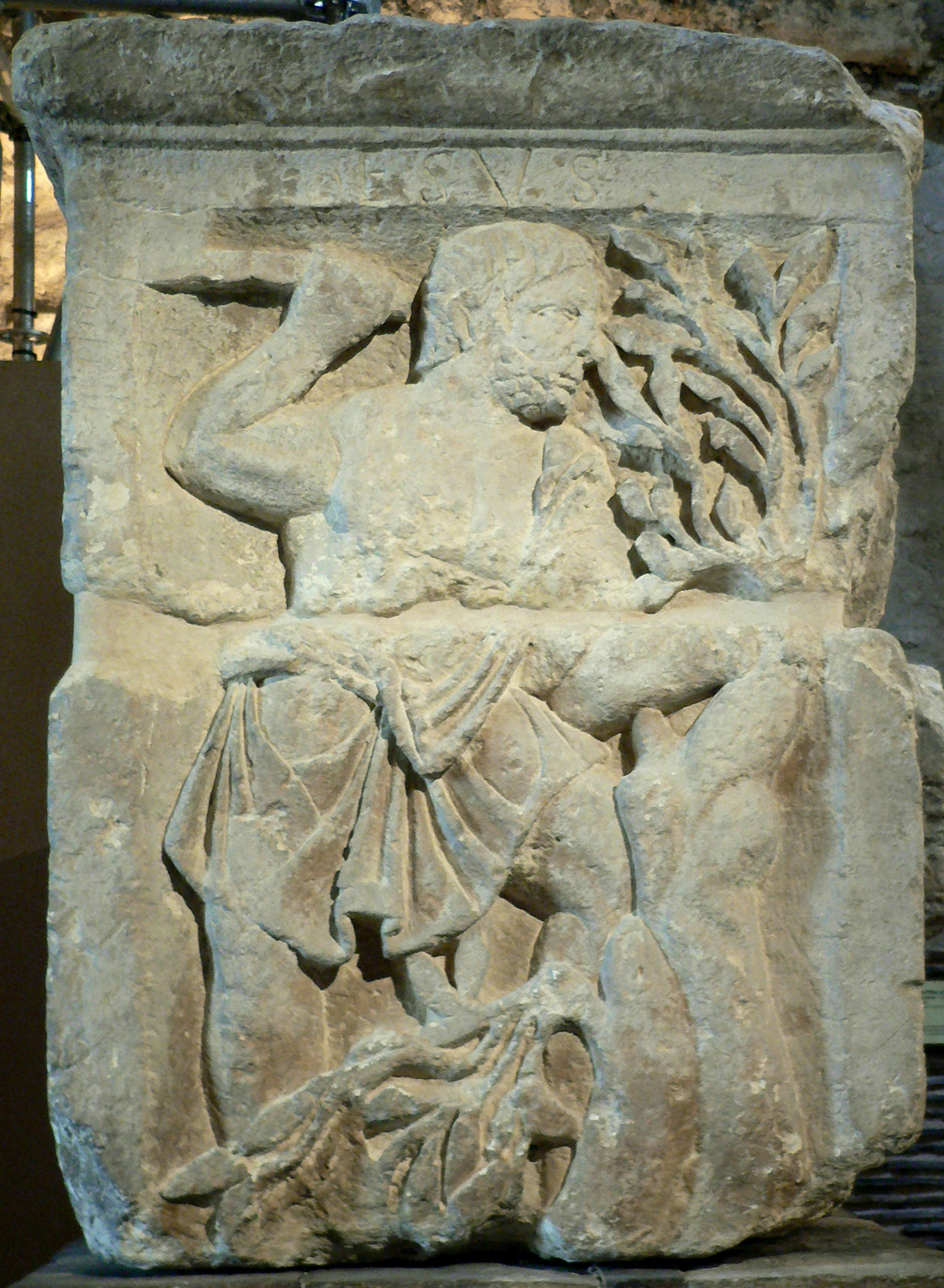
Image of the deity Æsus on the Gallo-Roman "Pillar of the Boatmen"

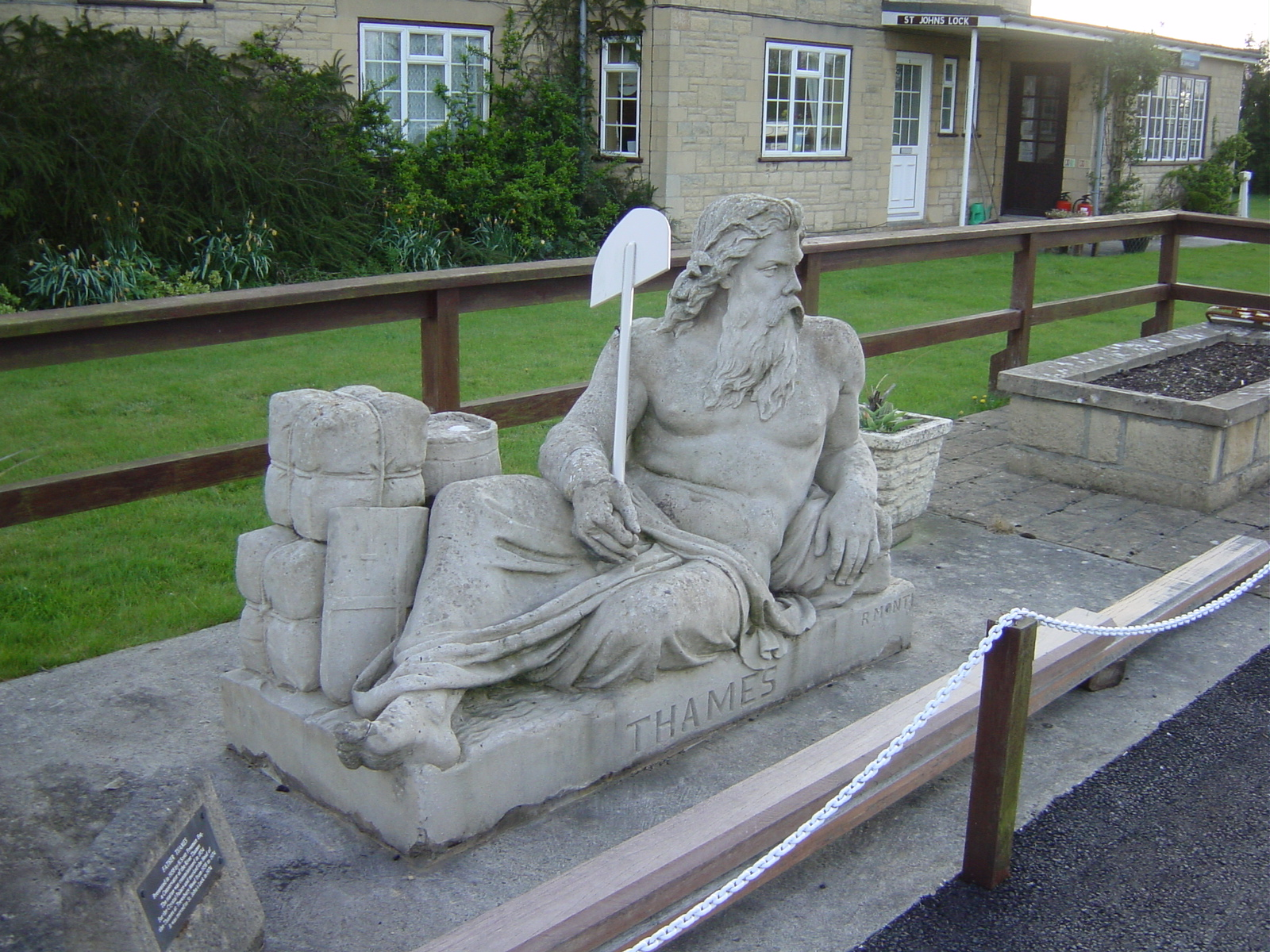
A statue of Old Father Thames by Raffaelle Monti at St John's Lock, Lechlade

According to Mallory and Adams, the Thames, from Middle English Temese, is derived from the Brittonic name for the river, Tamesas (from the hypothesised *tamēssa), recorded in Latin as Tamesis and yielding modern Welsh Tafwys "Thames".

The name element Tam may have meant "dark" and can be compared to other cognates such as Slavic темно (Proto-Slavic *tĭmĭnŭ), Lithuanian tamsi "dark", Latvian tumsa "darkness", Sanskrit tamas and Welsh tywyll "darkness" and Middle Irish teimen "dark grey". (Note: Chapter 5: The Celtic Element (P. H. Reaney) . . . The name is considered to be related to the Sanskrit Tamasa ("dark water"), the name of a tributary (Note: See Tamsa River) of the River Ganges.) The origin is shared by many other river names in Britain, such as the River Tamar at the border of Devon and Cornwall, several rivers named Tame in the Midlands and North Yorkshire, the Tavy on Dartmoor, the Team of the North East, the Teifi and Teme of Wales, the Teviot in the Scottish Borders and a Thames tributary, the Thame.

Kenneth H. Jackson proposed that the name of the Thames is not Indo-European (and of unknown meaning), while Peter Kitson suggested that it is Indo-European, but originated before the Britons, and has a name indicating "muddiness" from a root *tā-, 'melt'.

=== Name history ===
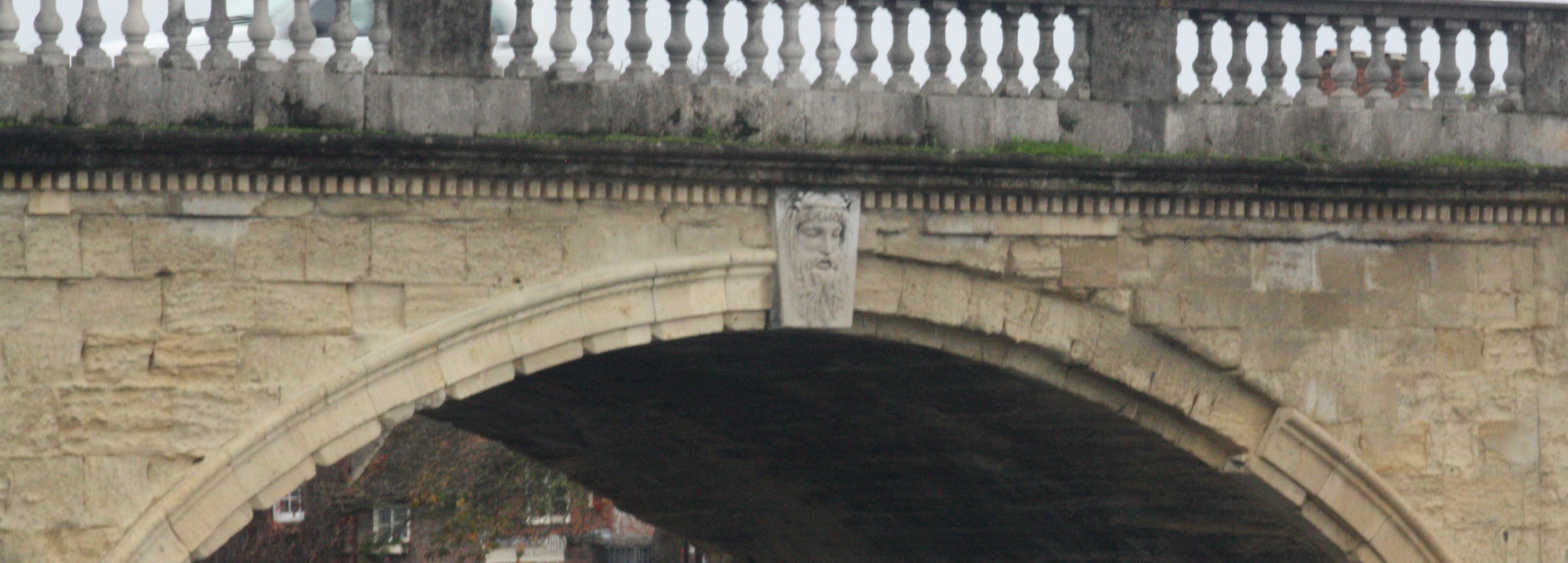
Sculpture of Tamesis. Downstream keystone of the central arch of Henley Bridge

Early variants of the name include:

- Tamesa (Brittonic)
- Tamesis (Latin)
- Tamis, Temes (Old English)
- Tamise, Thamis (1220) (Middle English, Anglo-Norman French) (Note: Chapter 5: "The Celtic Element" (P. H. Reaney). The common ME Tamise is a French form, as is the modern spelling with the French Th– for T– (Thamis 1220).)

Indirect evidence for the antiquity of the name "Thames" is provided by a Roman potsherd found at Oxford, bearing the inscription Tamesubugus fecit (Tamesubugus made [this]). It is believed that Tamesubugus' name was derived from that of the river. Tamese was referred to as a place, not a river in the Ravenna Cosmography (c. AD 700).

The river's name has always been pronounced with a simple t /t/; the Middle English spelling was typically Temese and the Brittonic form Tamesis. A similar spelling from 1210, "Tamisiam" (the accusative case of "Tamisia"; see Kingston upon Thames § Early history), is found in Magna Carta.

=== The Isis ===
The Thames through Oxford is sometimes called the Isis. Historically, and especially in Victorian times, gazetteers and cartographers insisted that the entire river was correctly named the Isis from its source down to Dorchester on Thames and that only from this point, where the river meets the Thame and becomes the "Thame-isis" (supposedly subsequently abbreviated to Thames) should it be so called. Ordnance Survey maps still label the Thames as "River Thames or Isis" down to Dorchester. Since the early 20th century this distinction has been lost in common usage outside of Oxford, and some historians suggest the name Isis is nothing more than a truncation of Tamesis, the Latin name for the Thames. Sculptures titled Tamesis and Isis by Anne Seymour Damer are located on the bridge at Henley-on-Thames, Oxfordshire (the original terracotta and plaster models were exhibited at the Royal Academy, London, in 1785. They are now (2018) on show at the River and Rowing Museum in Henley).

=== Name legacy ===
Richard Coates suggests that while the river as a whole was called the Thames, part of it, where it was too wide to ford, was called *(p)lowonida. This gave the name to a settlement on its banks, which became known as Londinium, from the Indo-European roots *pleu- "flow" and *-nedi "river" meaning something like the flowing river or the wide flowing unfordable river.

The river gives its name to the Thames Valley, a region of England around the river between Oxford and West London; the Thames Gateway; and the overlapping Thames Estuary around the tidal Thames to the east of London and including the waterway itself. Thames Valley Police is a formal body that takes its name from the river, covering three counties. In non-administrative use, the river's name is used in those of Thames Valley University, Thames Water, Thames Television, publishing company Thames & Hudson, Thameslink (north–south rail service passing through central London) and South Thames College. An example of its use in the names of historical entities is the Thames Ironworks and Shipbuilding Company.

== History ==
Marks of human activity, in some cases dating back to Pre-Roman Britain, are visible at various points along the river. These include a variety of structures connected with use of the river, such as navigations, bridges and watermills, as well as prehistoric burial mounds.

The lower Thames in the Roman era was a shallow waterway winding through marshes. But centuries of human intervention have transformed it into a deep tidal canal flowing between 200 miles of solid walls; these defend a floodplain where 1.5 million people work and live.

A major maritime route is formed for much of its length for shipping and supplies: through the Port of London for international trade, internally along its length and by its connection to the British canal system. The river's position has put it at the centre of many events in British history, leading to it being described by John Burns as "liquid history".

Two broad canals link the river to other rivers: the Kennet and Avon Canal (Reading to Bath) and the Grand Union Canal (London to the Midlands). The Grand Union effectively bypassed the earlier, narrow and winding Oxford Canal which remains open as a popular scenic recreational route. Three further cross-basin canals are disused but are in various stages of reconstruction: the Thames and Severn Canal (via Stroud), which operated until 1927 (to the west coast of England), the Wey and Arun Canal to Littlehampton, which operated until 1871 (to the south coast), and the Wilts & Berks Canal.

Rowing and sailing clubs are common along the Thames, which is navigable to such vessels. Kayaking and canoeing also take place. Major annual events include the Henley Royal Regatta and the Boat Race, while the Thames has been used during two Summer Olympic Games: 1908 (rowing) and 1948 (rowing and canoeing). Safe headwaters and reaches are a summer venue for organised swimming, which is prohibited on safety grounds in a stretch centred on Central London.

=== Conversion of marshland ===
After the river took its present-day course, many of the banks of the Thames Estuary and the Thames Valley in London were partly covered in marshland, as was the adjoining Lower Lea Valley. Streams and rivers like the River Lea, Tyburn Brook and Bollo Brook drained into the river, while some islands, e.g. Thorney Island, formed over the ages. The northern tip of the ancient parish of Lambeth, for example, was marshland known as Lambeth Marshe, but it was drained in the 18th century; the street names Lower Marsh and Upper Marsh preserve a memory.

Until the middle of the Victorian era, malaria was commonplace beside the River Thames, even in London, and was frequently lethal. Some cases continued to occur into the early 20th century. Draining of the marshes helped with its eradication, but the causes are complex and unclear.

The East End of London, also known simply as the East End, was the area of London east of the medieval walled City of London and north of the River Thames, although it is not defined by universally accepted formal boundaries; the River Lea can be considered another boundary. Most of the local riverside was also marshland. The land was drained and became farmland; it was built on after the Industrial Revolution.

Canvey Island in southern Essex (area 18.45 km^{2}, 7.12 sq mi; population 40,000) was once marshy, but is now a fully reclaimed island in the Thames estuary, separated from the mainland of south Essex by a network of creeks. Lying below sea level, it is prone to flooding at exceptional tides, but has nevertheless been inhabited since Roman times.

== Course ==
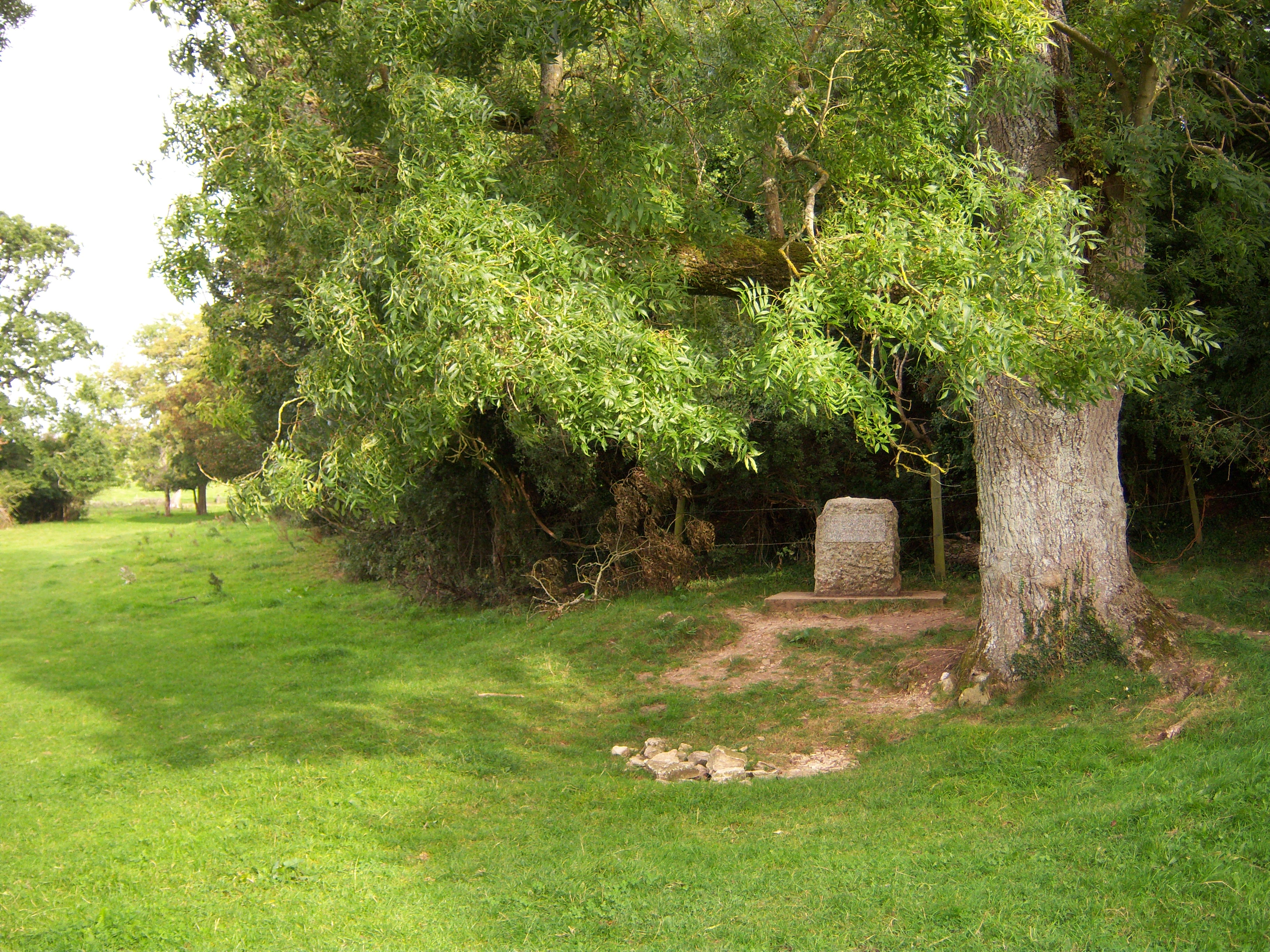
The marker stone at the official source of the River Thames named Thames Head near Kemble

The usually quoted source of the Thames is at Thames Head (at grid reference ST980994). This is about 1.5 mi (2.4 km) north of the village of Kemble in southern Gloucestershire, near the town of Cirencester, in the Cotswolds. However, Seven Springs near Cheltenham, where the Churn (which feeds into the Thames near Cricklade) rises, is also sometimes quoted as the Thames' source, as this location is farthest from the mouth and adds some 14 mi (23 km) to the river's length. At Seven Springs above the source is a stone with the Latin hexameter inscription "Hic tuus o Tamesine pater septemgeminus fons", which means "Here, O Father Thames, [is] your sevenfold source".

The springs at Seven Springs flow throughout the year, while those at Thames Head are seasonal (a winterbourne). With a length of 215 mi (346 km), the Thames is the longest river entirely in England. (The longest river in the United Kingdom, the Severn, flows partly in Wales.) However, as the River Churn, sourced at Seven Springs, is 14 mi (23 km) longer than the section of the Thames from its traditional source at Thames Head to the confluence, the overall length of the Thames measured from Seven Springs, at 229 mi (369 km), is greater than the Severn's length of 220 mi (350 km). Thus, the "Churn/Thames" river may be regarded as the longest natural river in the United Kingdom. The stream from Seven Springs is joined at Coberley by a longer tributary which could further increase the length of the Thames, with its source in the grounds of the National Star College at Ullenwood.

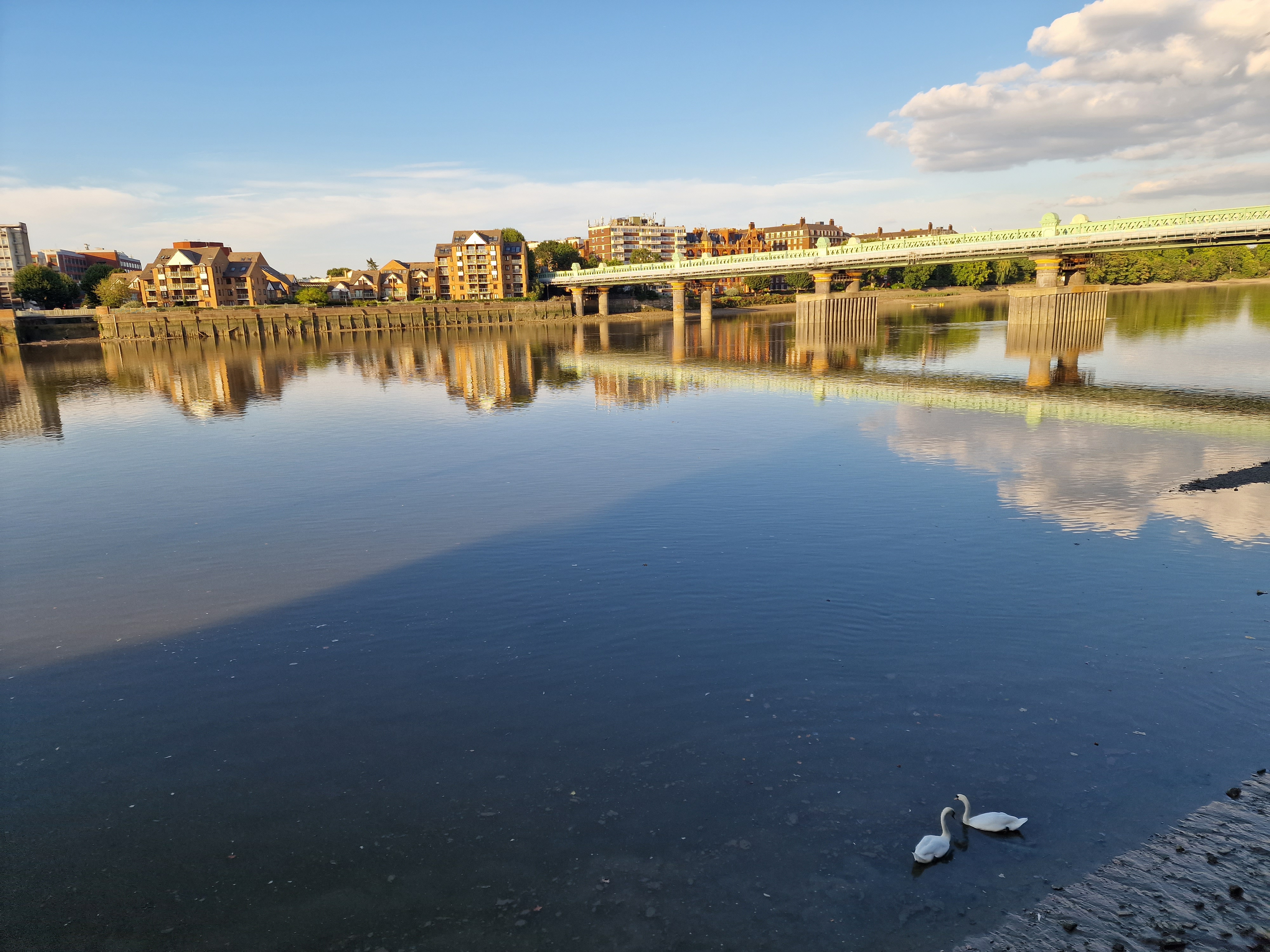
Fulham Railway Bridge over the River Thames at low tide

The Thames flows through or alongside Ashton Keynes, Cricklade, Lechlade, Oxford, Abingdon-on-Thames, Wallingford, Goring-on-Thames and Streatley (at the Goring Gap), Pangbourne and Whitchurch-on-Thames, Reading, Wargrave, Henley-on-Thames, Marlow, Maidenhead, Windsor and Eton, Staines-upon-Thames and Egham, Chertsey, Shepperton, Weybridge, Sunbury-on-Thames, Walton-on-Thames, Molesey and Thames Ditton. The river was subject to minor redefining and widening of the main channel around Oxford, Abingdon and Marlow before 1850, when further cuts to ease navigation reduced distances further.

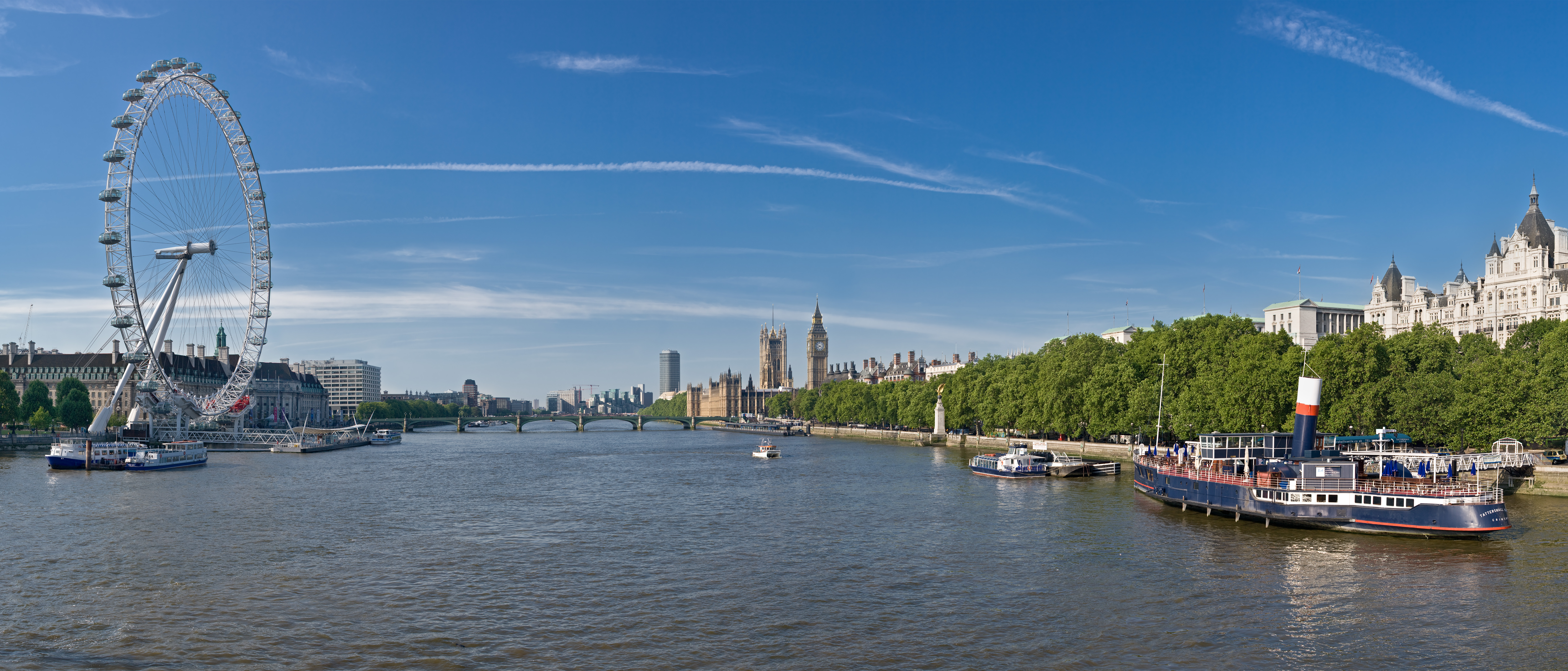
The Thames passes by some of the sights of London, including the Houses of Parliament and the London Eye.

Molesey faces Hampton, and in Greater London the Thames passes Hampton Court Palace, Surbiton, Kingston upon Thames, Teddington, Twickenham, Richmond (with a famous view of the Thames from Richmond Hill), Syon House, Kew, Brentford, Chiswick, Barnes, Hammersmith, Fulham, Putney, Wandsworth, Battersea and Chelsea. In central London, the river passes Pimlico and Vauxhall, and then forms one of the principal axes of the city, from the Palace of Westminster to the Tower of London. At this point, it historically formed the southern boundary of the medieval city, with Southwark, on the opposite bank, then being part of Surrey.

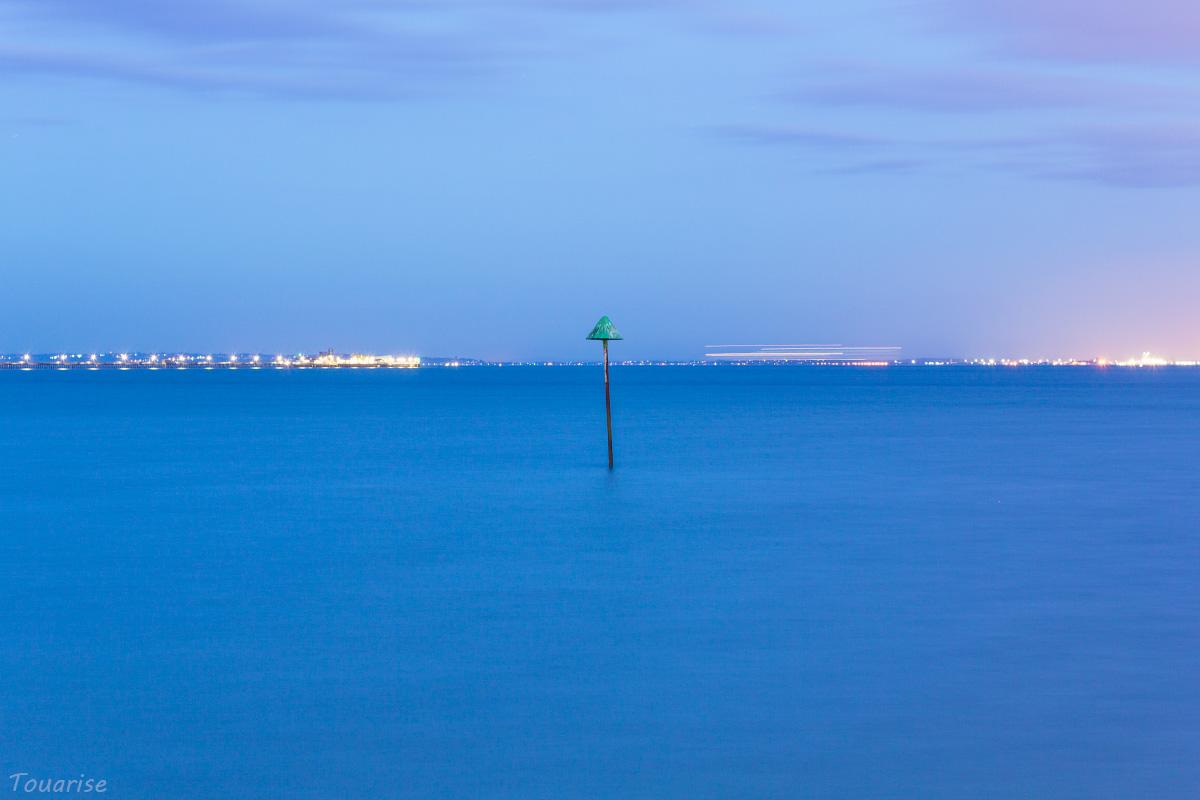
River Thames, Southend-on-Sea, 2019

Beyond central London, the river passes Bermondsey, Wapping, Shadwell, Limehouse, Rotherhithe, Millwall, Deptford, Greenwich, Cubitt Town, Blackwall, New Charlton and Silvertown, before flowing through the Thames Barrier, which protects central London from flooding by storm surges. Below the barrier, the river passes Woolwich, Thamesmead, Dagenham, Erith, Purfleet, Dartford, West Thurrock, Northfleet, Tilbury and Gravesend before entering the Thames Estuary near Southend-on-Sea.

=== Sea level ===
The sea level in the Thames estuary is rising and the rate of rise is increasing.

Sediment cores up to 10 metres (33 ft) deep collected by the British Geological Survey from the banks of the tidal River Thames contain geochemical information and fossils which provide a 10,000-year record of sea-level change. Combined, this and other studies suggest that the Thames sea-level has risen more than 30 metres (100 ft) during the Holocene at a rate of around 5–6 mm (1/5 to 1/4 inch) per year from 10,000 to 6,000 years ago. The rise in sea level dramatically reduced at around the completion of the ice melt over the past 4,000 years. Since the beginning of the 20th century, rates of sea level rise have ranged from 1.22 mm (0.048 inch) per year to 2.14 mm (0.084 inch) per year.

=== Catchment area and discharge ===
The Thames River Basin District, including the Medway catchment, covers an area of 6,229 sq mi (16,130 km^{2}). The entire river basin is a mixture of urban and rural, with rural landscape predominating in the western part. The area is among the driest in the United Kingdom. Water resources consist of groundwater from aquifers and water taken from the Thames and its tributaries, much of it stored in large bank-side reservoirs.

The Thames itself provides two-thirds of London's drinking water, while groundwater supplies about 40 per cent of public water supplies in the overall catchment area. Groundwater is an important water source, especially in the drier months, so maintaining its quality and quantity is extremely important. Groundwater is vulnerable to surface pollution, especially in highly urbanised areas.

==== Non-tidal section ====
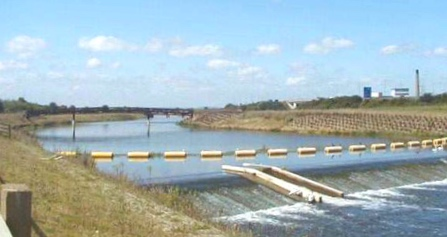
The Jubilee River at Slough Weir

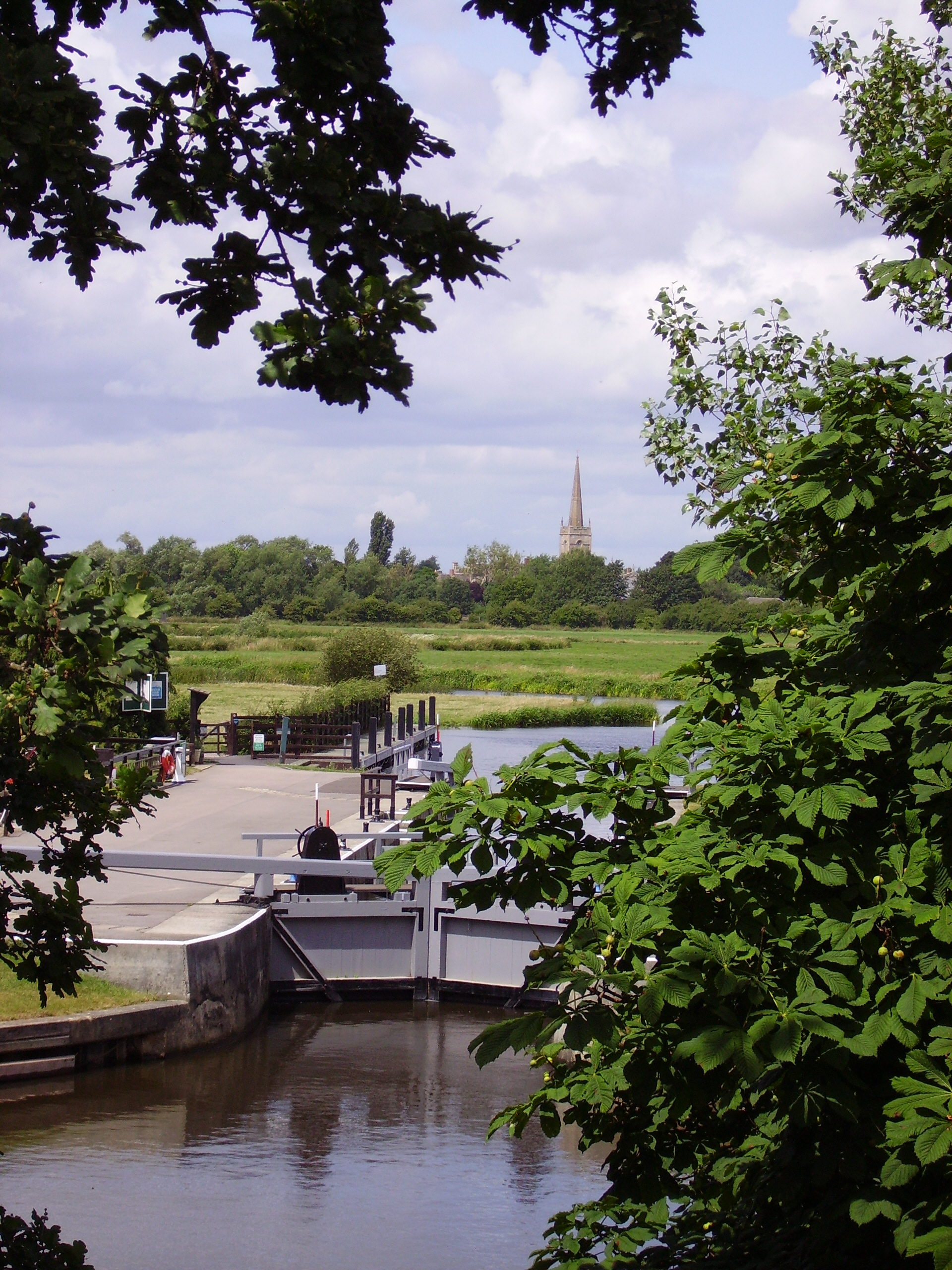
St John's Lock, near Lechlade

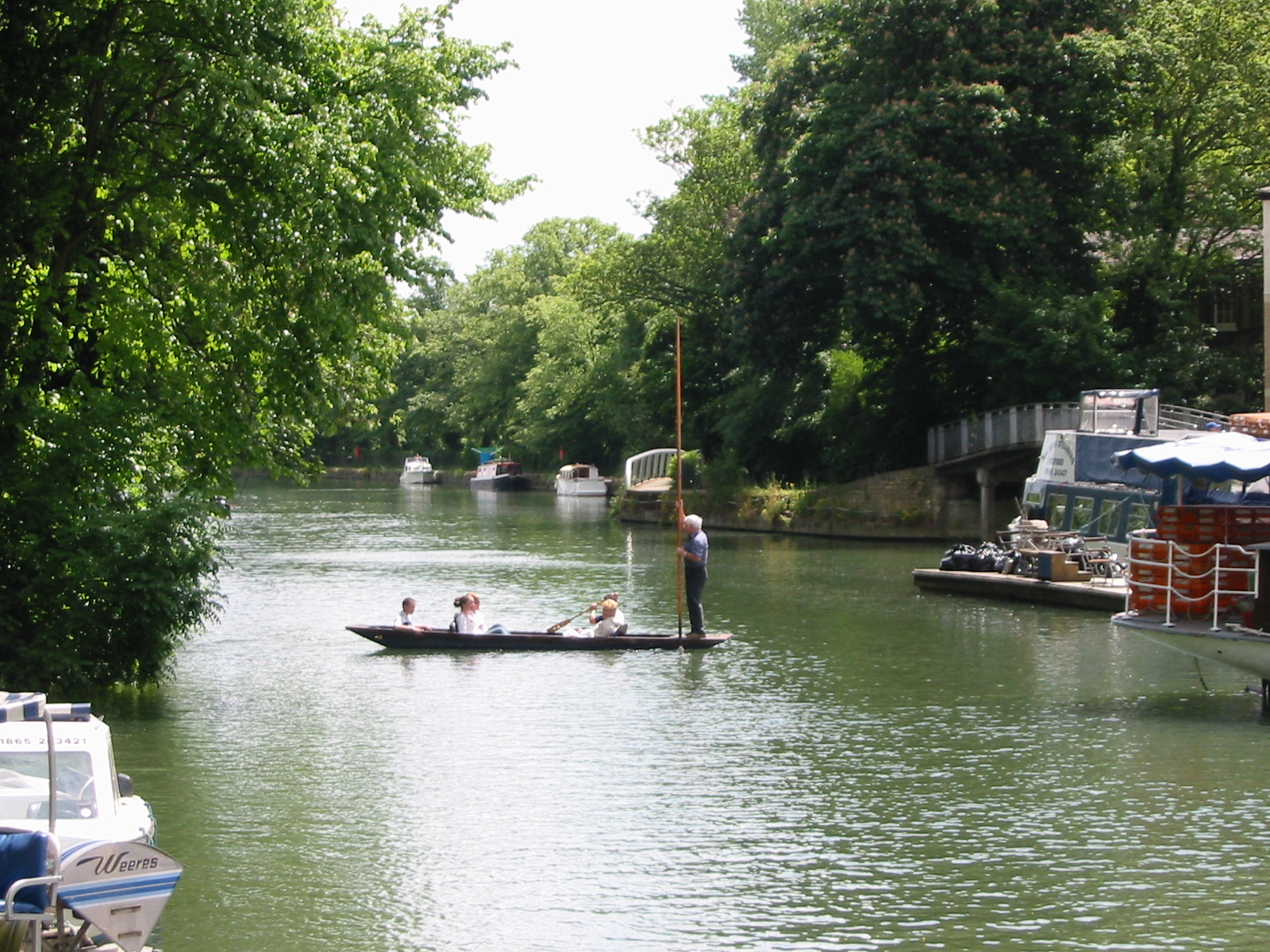
The River Thames in Oxford

Brooks, canals and rivers, within an area of 3,842 sq mi (9,951 km^{2}), combine to form 38 main tributaries feeding the Thames between its source and Teddington Lock. This is the usual tidal limit; however, high spring tides can raise the head water level in the reach above Teddington and can occasionally reverse the river flow for a short time. In these circumstances, tidal effects can be observed upstream to the next lock beside Molesey weir, which is visible from the towpath and bridge beside Hampton Court Palace. Before Teddington Lock was built in 1810–12, the river was tidal at peak spring tides as far as Staines upon Thames.

In descending order, non-related tributaries of the non-tidal Thames, with river status, are the Churn, Leach, Cole, Ray, Coln, Windrush, Evenlode, Cherwell, Ock, Thame, Pang, Kennet, Loddon, Colne, Wey and Mole. In addition, there are occasional backwaters and artificial cuts that form islands, distributaries (most numerous in the case of the Colne), and man-made distributaries such as the Longford River. Three canals intersect this stretch: the Oxford Canal, Kennet and Avon Canal and Wey Navigation.

Its longest artificial secondary channel (cut), the Jubilee River, was built between Maidenhead and Windsor for flood relief and completed in 2002.

The non-tidal section of the river is managed by the Environment Agency, which is responsible for managing the flow of water to help prevent and mitigate flooding, and providing for navigation: the volume and speed of water downstream is managed by adjusting the sluices at each of the weirs and, at peak high water, levels are generally dissipated over preferred flood plains adjacent to the river. Occasionally, flooding of inhabited areas is unavoidable and the agency issues flood warnings. Due to stiff penalties applicable on the non-tidal river, which is a drinking water source before treatment, sanitary sewer overflow from the many sewage treatment plants covering the upper Thames basin should be rare in the non-tidal Thames. However, storm sewage overflows are still common in almost all the main tributaries of the Thames despite claims by Thames Water to the contrary.

==== Tidal section ====
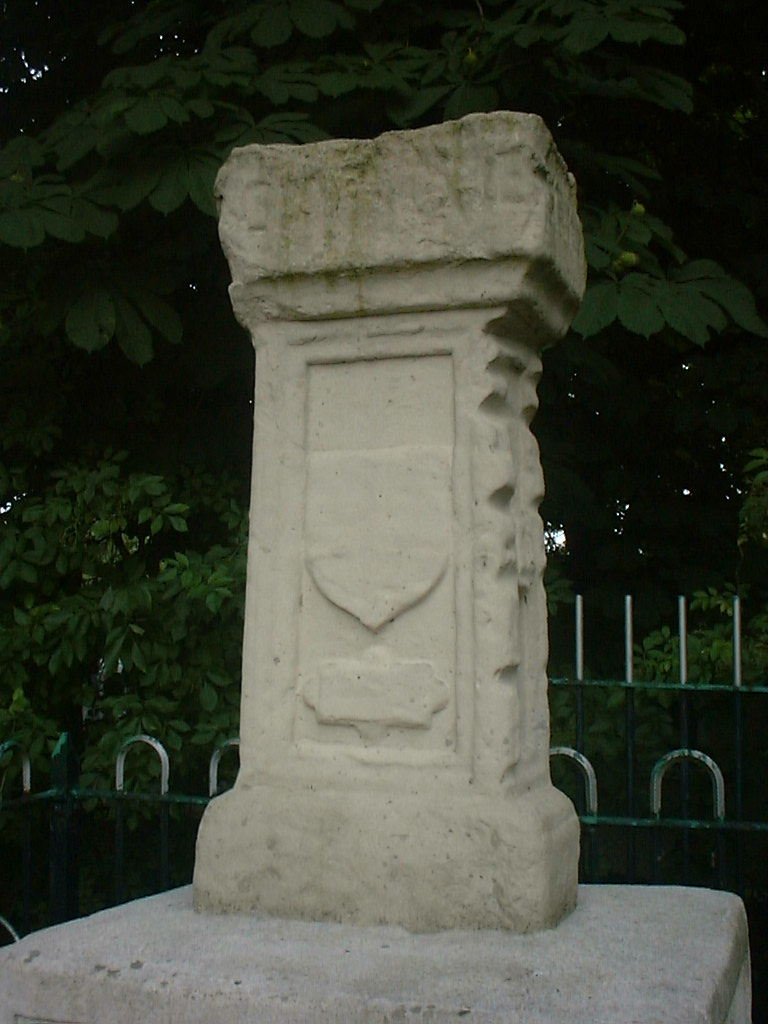
London Stone at Staines, built in 1285 marked the customs limit of the Thames and the City of London's jurisdiction.

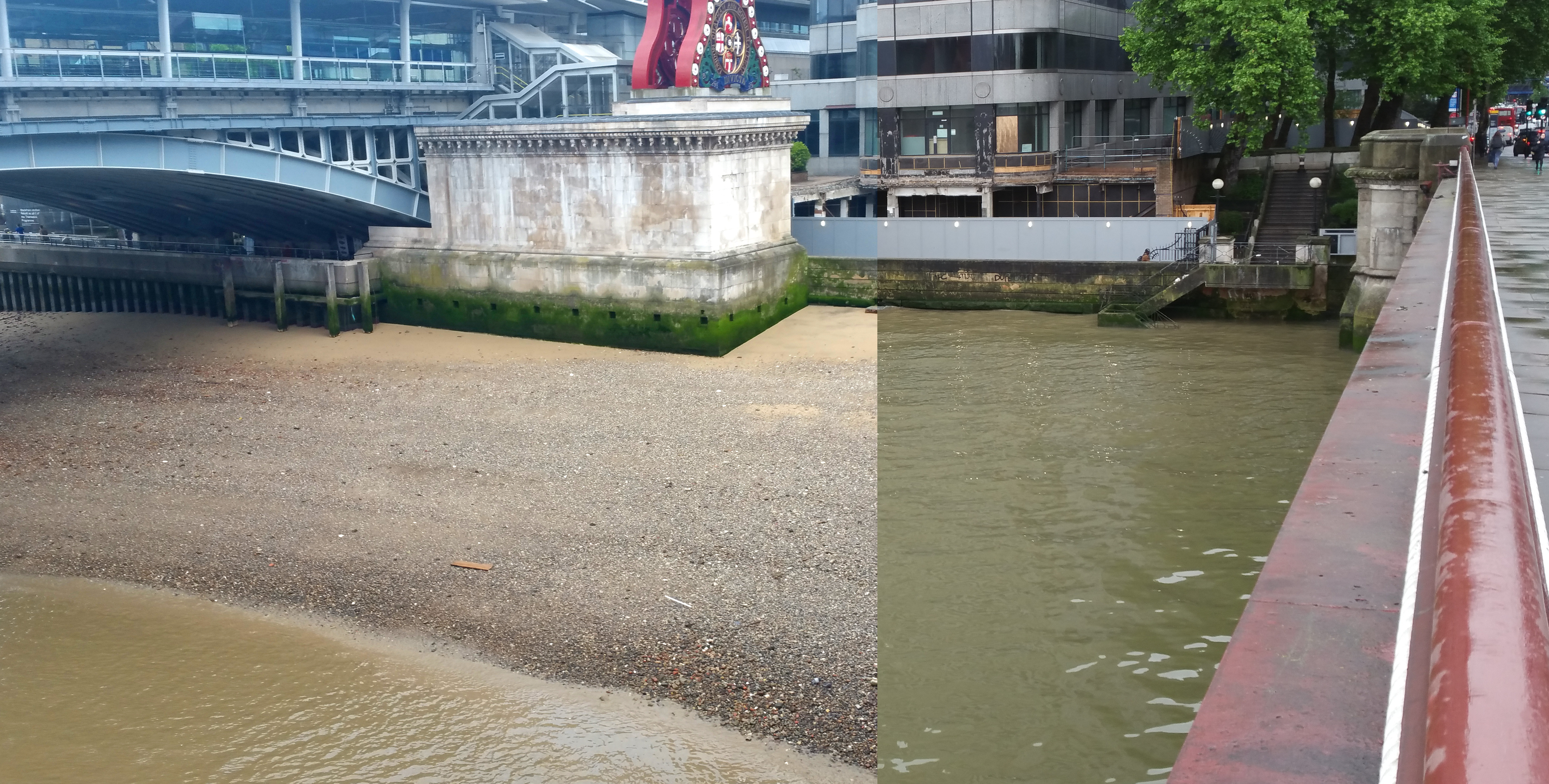
Waterstand of Thames at low tide (left) and high tide (right) in comparison at Blackfriars Bridge in London

Below Teddington Lock (about 55 mi or 89 km upstream of the Thames Estuary), the river is subject to tidal activity from the North Sea. Before the lock was installed, the river was tidal as far as Staines, about 16 mi (26 km) upstream. London, capital of Roman Britain, was established on two hills, now known as Cornhill and Ludgate Hill. These provided a firm base for a trading centre at the lowest possible point on the Thames.

A river crossing was built at the site of London Bridge. London Bridge is now used as the basis for published tide tables giving the times of high tide. High tide reaches Putney about 30 minutes later than London Bridge, and Teddington about an hour later. The tidal stretch of the river is known as the Tideway. Tide tables are published by the Port of London Authority and available online.

The principal tributaries of the River Thames on the Tideway include the rivers Crane, Brent, Wandle, Ravensbourne (the final part of which is called Deptford Creek), Lea (the final part of which is called Bow Creek), Roding (Barking Creek), Darent and Ingrebourne. In London, the water is slightly brackish with sea salt, being a mix of sea and fresh water.

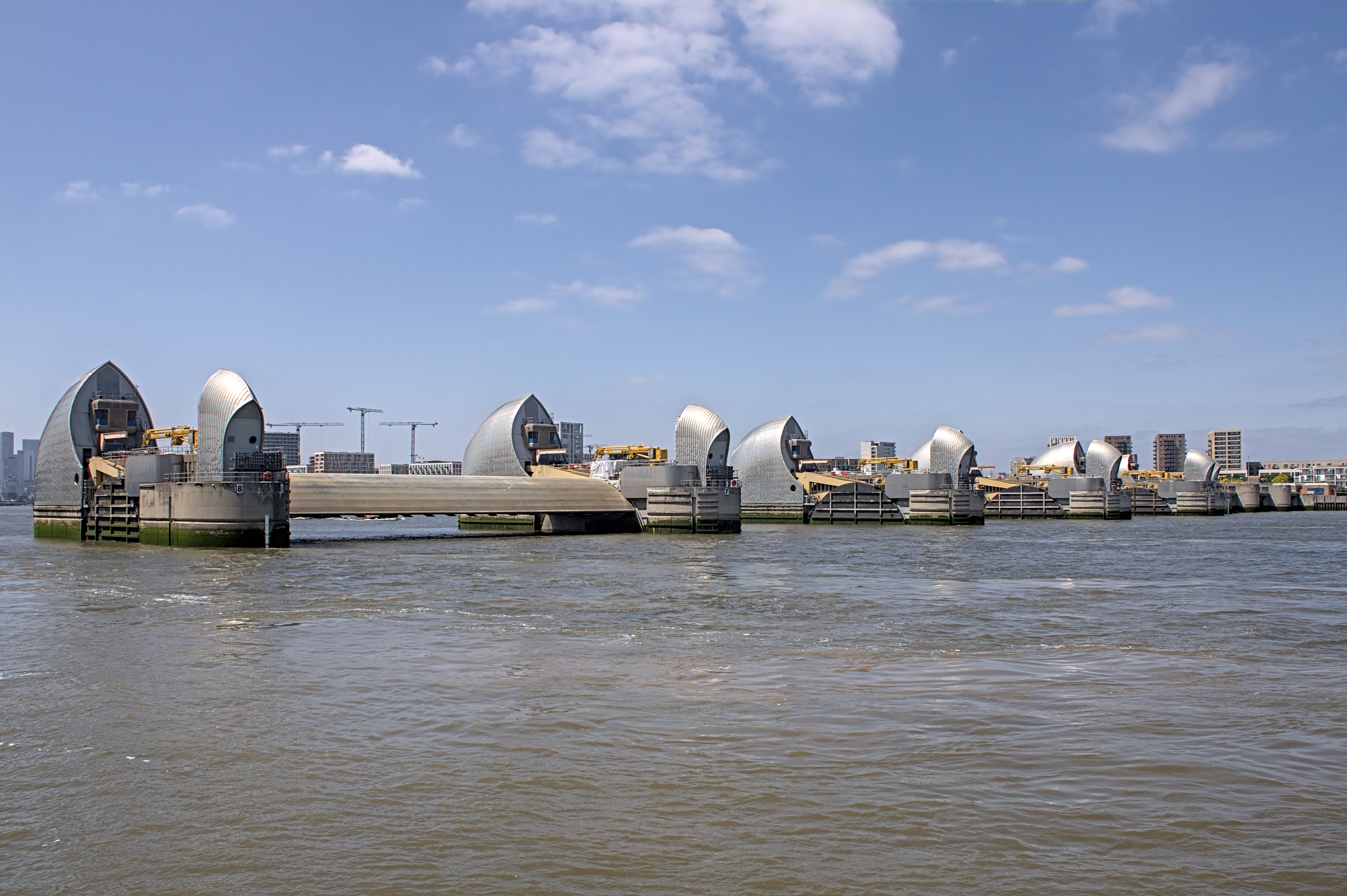
The Thames Barrier provides protection against floods.

This part of the river is managed by the Port of London Authority. The flood threat here comes from high tides and strong winds from the North Sea, and the Thames Barrier was built in the 1980s to protect London from this risk.

The Nore is the sandbank that marks the mouth of the Thames Estuary, where the outflow from the Thames meets the North Sea. It is roughly halfway between Havengore Creek in Essex and Warden Point on the Isle of Sheppey in Kent. Until 1964 it marked the seaward limit of the Port of London Authority. As the sandbank was a major hazard for shipping coming in and out of London, in 1732 it received the world's first lightship. This became a major landmark, and was used as an assembly point for shipping. Today it is marked by Sea Reach No. 1 Buoy.

=== Islands ===
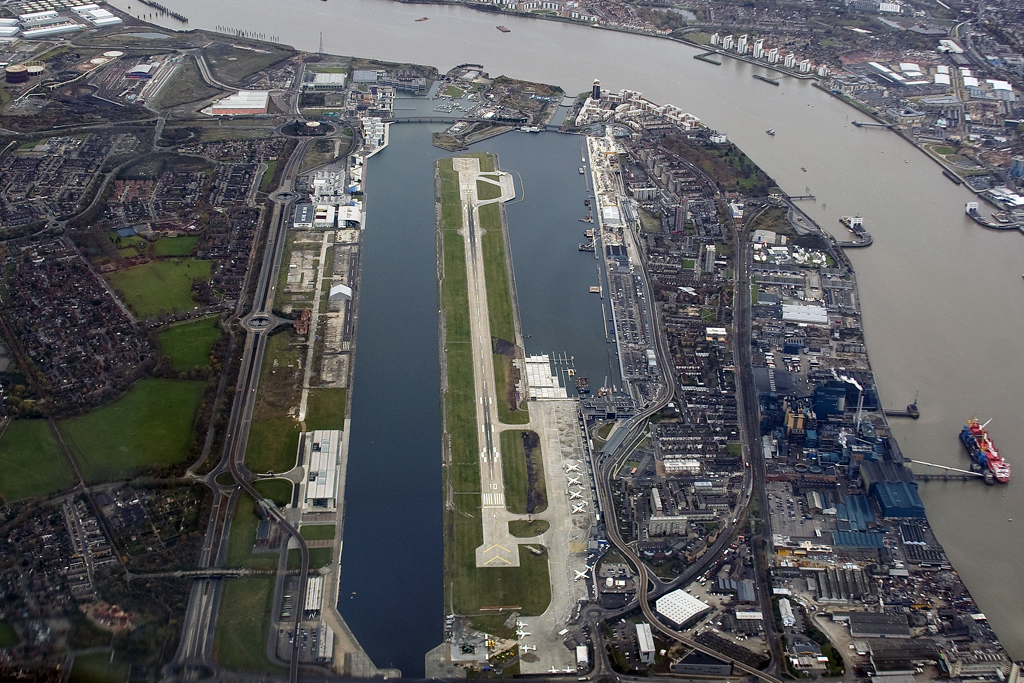
London City Airport is on the site of a dock.

The River Thames contains over 80 islands ranging from the large estuarial marshlands of the Isle of Sheppey and Canvey Island to small tree-covered islets like Rose Isle in Oxfordshire and Headpile Eyot in Berkshire. They are found all the way from Fiddler's Island in Oxfordshire to the Isle of Sheppey in Kent. Some of the largest inland islands, for example Formosa Island near Cookham and Andersey Island at Abingdon, were created naturally when the course of the river divided into separate streams.

In the Oxford area the river splits into several streams across the floodplain (Seacourt Stream, Castle Mill Stream, Bulstake Stream and others), creating several islands (Fiddler's Island, Osney and others). Desborough Island, Ham Island at Old Windsor and Penton Hook Island were artificially created by lock cuts and navigation channels. Chiswick Eyot is a landmark on the Boat Race course, while Glover's Island forms the centre of a view from Richmond Hill.

Islands of historical interest include Magna Carta Island at Runnymede, Fry's Island at Reading, and Pharaoh's Island near Shepperton. In more recent times Platts Eyot at Hampton was the place where Motor Torpedo Boats (MTB)s were built, Tagg's Island near Molesey was associated with the impresario Fred Karno and Eel Pie Island at Twickenham was the birthplace of the South East's R&B music scene.

Westminster Abbey and the Palace of Westminster (commonly known today as the Houses of Parliament) were built on Thorney Island, which used to be an eyot.

== Geology ==
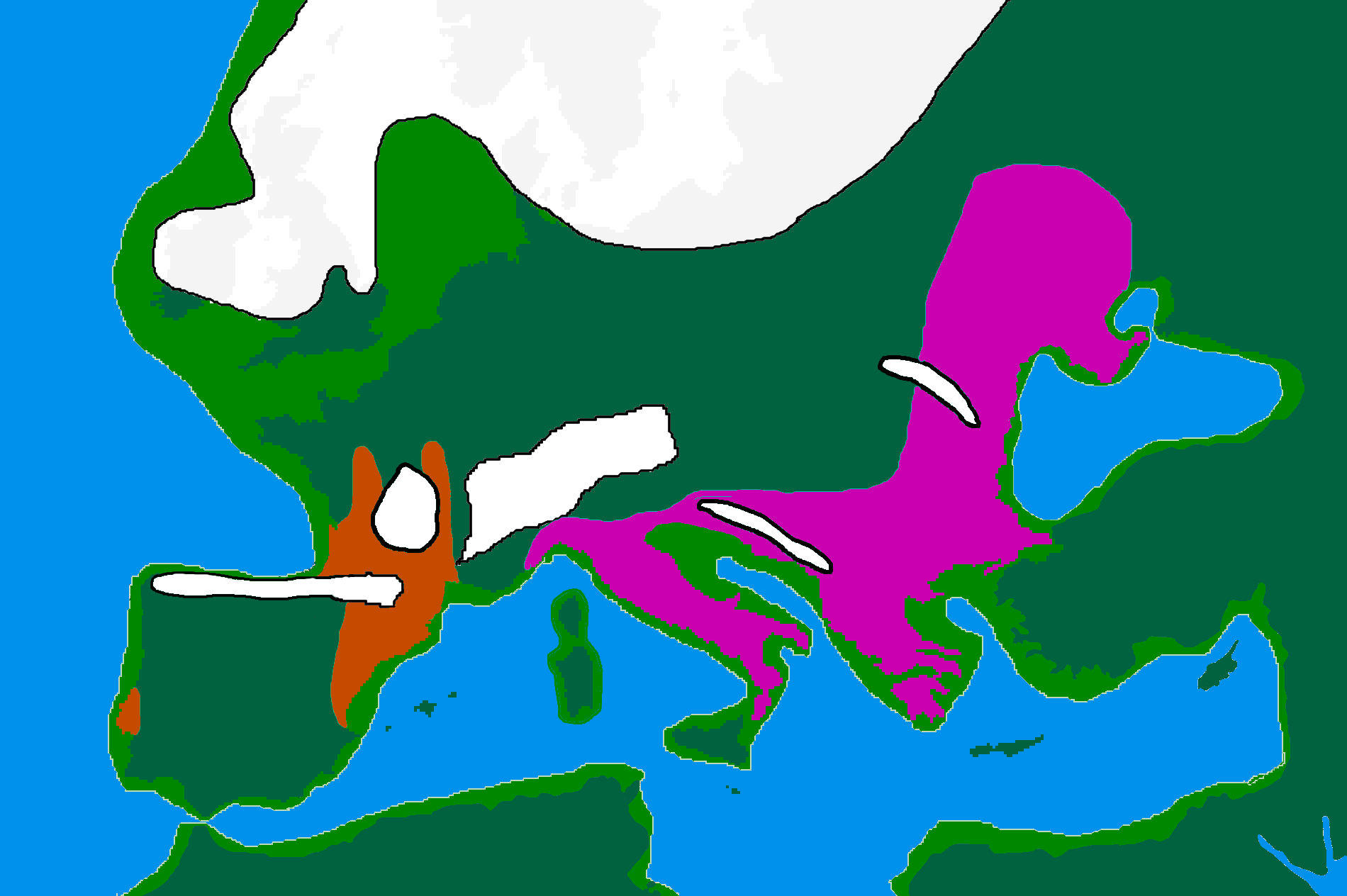
European LGM refuges, 20,000 years ago. The Thames was a minor river that joined the Rhine, in the southern North Sea Basin at this time. Solutrean and Proto Solutrean Cultures Epi Gravettian Culture

Researchers have identified the River Thames as a discrete drainage line flowing as early as 58 million years ago, in the Thanetian stage of the late Palaeocene epoch. Until around 500,000 years ago, the Thames flowed on its existing course through what is now Oxfordshire, before turning to the north-east through Hertfordshire and East Anglia and reaching the North Sea near present-day Ipswich.

At this time the river-system headwaters lay in the English West Midlands and may, at times, have received drainage from the Berwyn Mountains in North Wales.

=== Ice age ===
About 450,000 years ago, in the most extreme Ice Age of the Pleistocene, the Anglian, the furthest southern extent of the ice sheet reached Hornchurch in east London, the Vale of St Albans, and the Finchley Gap.

It dammed the river in Hertfordshire, resulting in the formation of large ice lakes, which eventually burst their banks and caused the river to divert onto its present course through the area of present-day London.

The ice lobe which stopped at present-day Finchley deposited about 14 metres of boulder clay there. Its torrent of meltwater gushed through the Finchley Gap and south towards the new course of the Thames, and proceeded to carve out the Brent Valley in the process.

The Anglian ice advance resulted in a new course for the Thames through Berkshire and on into London, after which the river rejoined its original course in southern Essex, near the present River Blackwater estuary. Here it entered a substantial freshwater lake in the southern North Sea basin, south of what is called Doggerland. The overspill of this lake caused the formation of the Channel River and later the Dover Strait gap between present-day Britain and France. Subsequent development led to the continuation of the course that the river follows at the present day.

Most of the bedrock of the Vale of Aylesbury comprises clay and chalk that formed at the end of the ice age and at one time was under the Proto-Thames. At this time the vast underground reserves of water formed that make the water table higher than average in the Vale of Aylesbury.

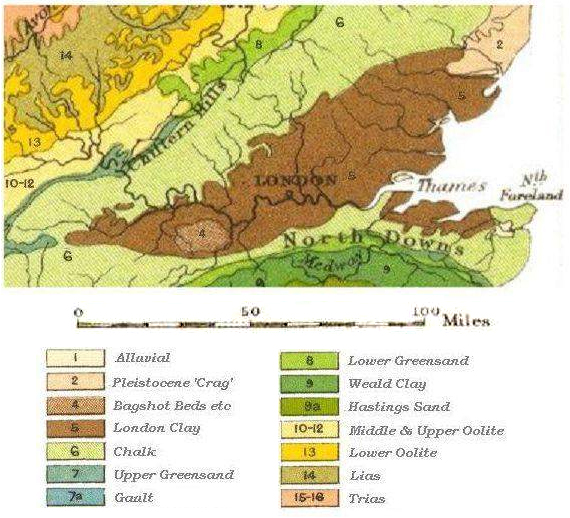
A geological map of the London Basin; the London Clay is marked in dark brown.

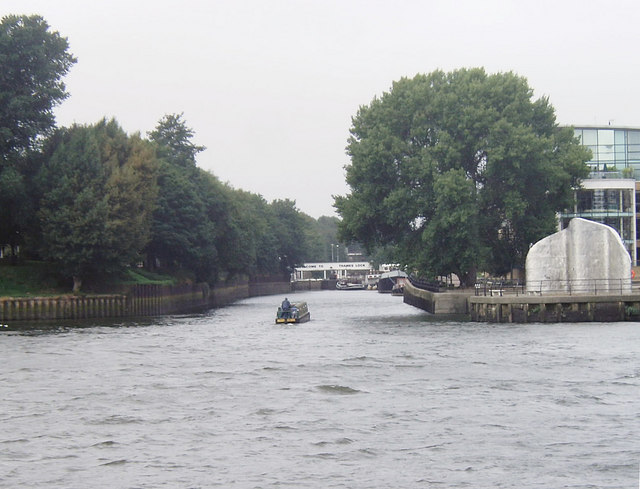
The confluence of the Rivers Thames and Brent. The narrowboat is heading up the River Brent. From this point as far as Hanwell the Brent has been canalised and shares its course with the main line of the Grand Union Canal. From Hanwell the Brent can be traced to various sources in the Barnet area.

At the height of the last ice age, around 20,000 BC, Britain was connected to mainland Europe by a large expanse of land known as Doggerland in the southern North Sea Basin. At this time, the Thames' course did not continue to Doggerland but flowed southwards from the eastern Essex coast where it met the waters of the proto-Rhine–Meuse–Scheldt delta flowing from what are now the Netherlands and Belgium. These rivers formed a single river – the Channel River (Fleuve Manche) – that passed through the Dover Strait and drained into the Atlantic Ocean in the western English Channel.

Upon the valley sides of the Thames and some of its tributaries can be seen other terraces of brickearth, laid over and sometimes interlayered with the clays. These deposits were brought in by the winds during the periglacial periods, suggesting that wide, flat marshes were then part of the landscape, which the new rivers proceeded to cut into.

The steepness of some valley sides indicates very much lower mean sea levels caused by the glaciation locking up so much water upon the land masses, thus causing the river water to flow rapidly seaward and so erode its bed quickly downwards.

The original land surface was around 350 to 400 ft (110 to 120 m) above the current sea-level. The surface had sandy deposits from an ancient sea, laid over sedimentary clay (this is the blue London Clay). All the erosion down from this higher land surface, and the sorting action by these changes of water flow and direction, formed what is known as the Thames River Gravel Terraces. Sand and gravel was deposited near Beaconsfield and other places by the ancestral Thames. This sand and gravel is now being excavated.

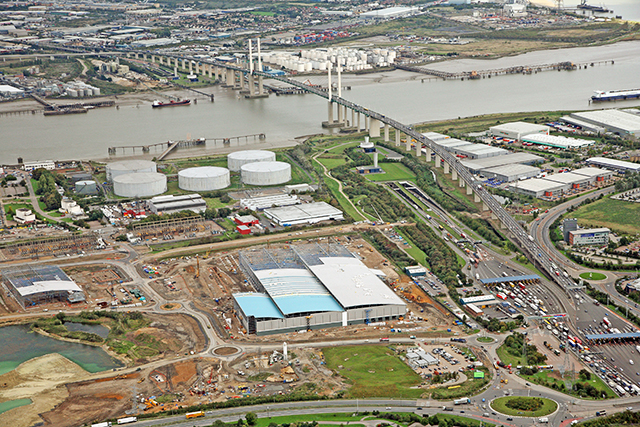
The M25 goes over the River Thames

Since Roman times and perhaps earlier, the isostatic rebound from the weight of previous ice sheets, and its interplay with the eustatic change in sea level, have resulted in the old valley of the River Brent, together with that of the Thames, silting up again. Thus, along much of the Brent's present-day course, one can make out the water-meadows of rich alluvium, which is augmented by frequent floods.

== Wildlife ==
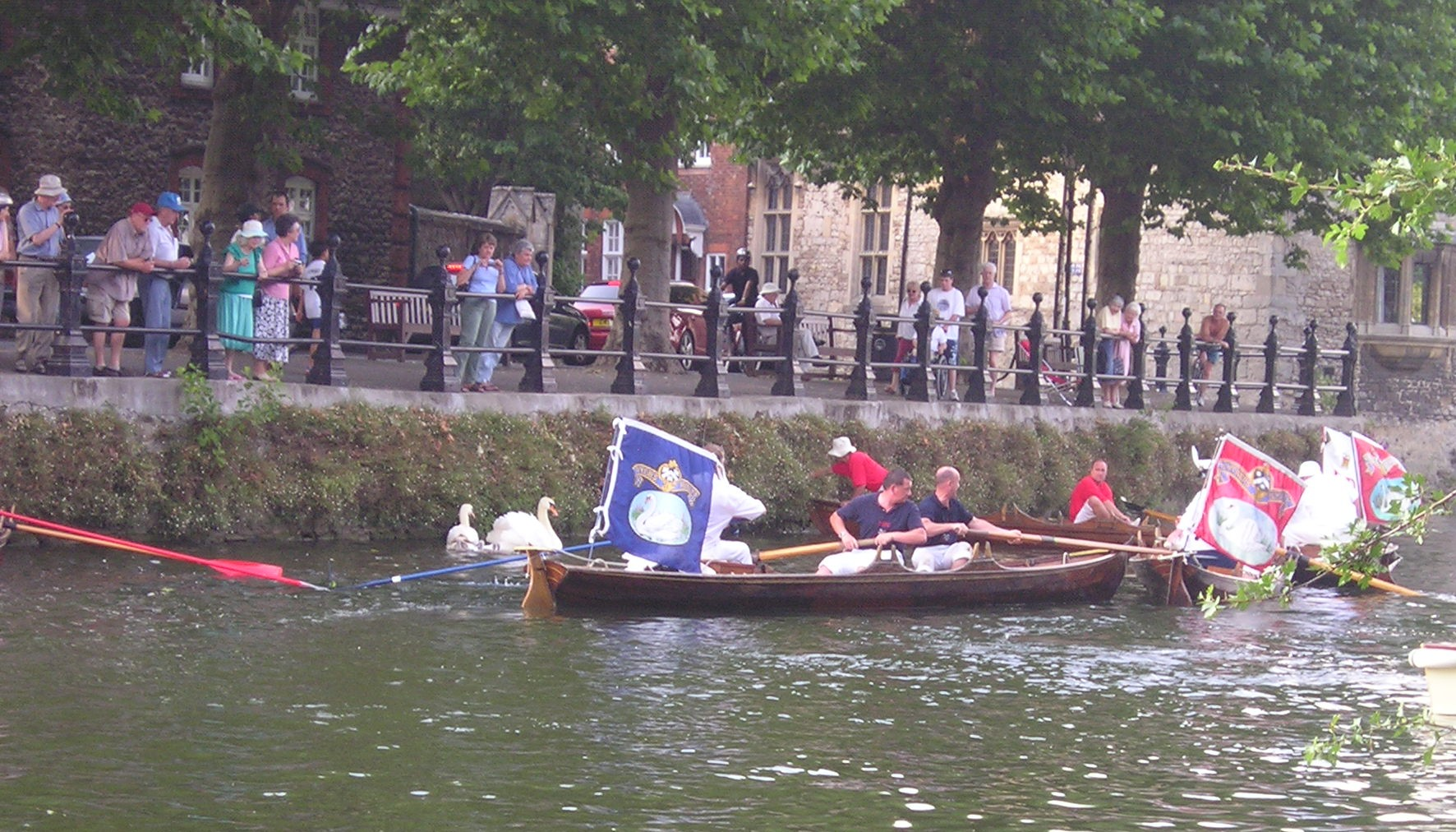
Swan Upping – skiffs surround the swans

Various species of birds feed off the river or nest on it, some being found both at sea and inland. These include cormorant, black-headed gull and herring gull. The mute swan is a familiar sight on the river but the escaped black swan is more rare. The annual ceremony of Swan Upping is an old tradition of counting stocks.

Non-native geese that can be seen include Canada geese, Egyptian geese and bar-headed geese, and ducks include the familiar native mallard, plus introduced Mandarin duck and wood duck. Other water birds to be found on the Thames include the great crested grebe, coot, moorhen, heron and kingfisher. Many types of British birds also live alongside the river, although they are not specific to the river habitat.

The Thames contains both sea water and fresh water, thus providing support for seawater and freshwater fish. However, many populations of fish are at risk and are being killed in tens of thousands because of pollutants leaking into the river from human activities. Salmon, which inhabit both environments, have been reintroduced and a succession of fish ladders have been built into weirs to enable them to travel upstream.

On 5 August 1993, the largest non-tidal salmon in recorded history was caught close to Boulters Lock in Maidenhead. The specimen weighed 14 1/2 lb (6.6 kg) and measured 22 in (56 cm) in length. The eel is particularly associated with the Thames and there were formerly many eel traps. Freshwater fish of the Thames and its tributaries include brown trout, chub, dace, roach, barbel, perch, pike, bleak and flounder. Colonies of short-snouted seahorses as well as tope and starry smooth-hound sharks have also recently been discovered in the river. The Thames is also host to some invasive crustaceans, including the signal crayfish and the Chinese mitten crab.

Aquatic mammals are also known to inhabit the Thames. The population of grey and harbour seals numbers up to 700 in the Thames Estuary. These animals have been sighted as far upriver as Richmond. Bottlenose dolphins and harbour porpoises are also sighted in the Thames.

On 20 January 2006, a 16–18 ft (4.9–5.5 m) northern bottle-nosed whale was seen in the Thames as far upstream as Chelsea. This was extremely unusual: this whale is generally found in deep sea waters. Crowds gathered along the riverbanks to witness the spectacle but there was soon concern, as the animal came within yards of the banks, almost beaching, and crashed into an empty boat causing slight bleeding. About 12 hours later, the whale is believed to have been seen again near Greenwich, possibly heading back to sea. A rescue attempt lasted several hours, but the whale died on a barge. See River Thames whale.

On 25 September 2018, a beluga whale was spotted off Gravesend, more than 1,000 miles (870 nmi) from its habitat in the Arctic. Nicknamed "Benny the Beluga", the male mammal was spotted over the course of three months throughout the Thames. Many researchers believed the animal appeared lost or 'in trouble.' It was last seen in the Cliffe area, east of Gravesend, and is believed to have left the Thames the following January.

== Human history ==
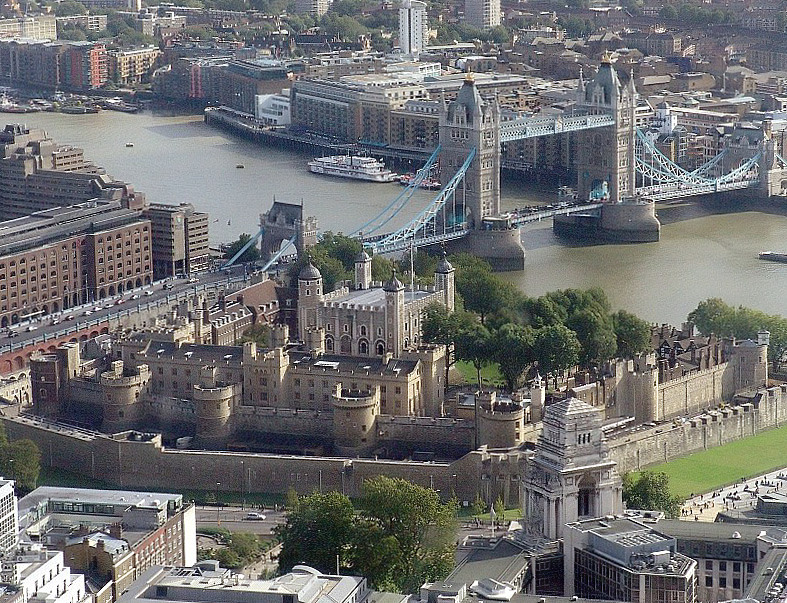
The Tower of London begun in the 11th century, with Tower Bridge, built 800 years later

The River Thames has played several roles in human history: as an economic resource, a maritime route, a boundary, a fresh water source, a source of food and more recently a leisure facility. In 1929, John Burns, one-time MP for Battersea, responded to an American's unfavourable comparison of the Thames with the Mississippi by coining the expression "The Thames is liquid history".

There is evidence of human habitation living off the river along its length dating back to Neolithic times. The British Museum has a decorated bowl (3300–2700 BC), found in the river at Hedsor, Buckinghamshire, and a considerable amount of material was discovered during the excavations of Dorney Lake. A number of Bronze Age sites and artefacts have been discovered along the banks of the river including settlements at Lechlade, Cookham and Sunbury-on-Thames.

So extensive have the changes to this landscape been that what little evidence there is of man's presence before the ice came has inevitably shown signs of transportation here by water and reveals nothing specifically local. Likewise, later evidence of occupation, even since the arrival of the Romans, may lie next to the original banks of the Brent but have been buried under centuries of silt.

=== Roman Britain ===
Some of the earliest written references to the Thames (Latin: Tamesis) occur in Julius Caesar's account of his second expedition to Britain in 54 BC, when the Thames presented a major obstacle and he encountered the Iron Age Belgic tribes (Catuvellauni and Atrebates) along the river. At the confluence of the Thames and Cherwell was the site of early settlements and the River Cherwell marked the boundary between the Dobunni tribe to the west and the Catuvellauni to the east (these were pre-Roman Celtic tribes). In the late 1980s a large Romano-British settlement was excavated on the edge of the village of Ashton Keynes in Wiltshire.

Starting in AD 43, under the Emperor Claudius, the Romans occupied England and, recognising the river's strategic and economic importance, built fortifications along the Thames valley including a major camp at Dorchester. Cornhill and Ludgate Hill provided a defensible site near a point on the river both deep enough for the era's ships and narrow enough to be bridged; Londinium (London) grew up around the Walbrook on the north bank around the year 47. Boudica's Iceni razed the settlement in AD 60 or 61, but it was soon rebuilt; and once the bridge was built, it grew to become the provincial capital of the island.

The next Roman bridges upstream were at Staines on the Devil's Highway between Londinium and Calleva (Silchester). Boats could be swept up to it on the rising tide, with no need for wind or muscle power.

=== Middle Ages ===
A Romano-British settlement grew up north of the confluence of the Thames and Cherwell, partly because the site was naturally protected from attack on the east side by the Cherwell and on the west by the Thames. This settlement dominated the pottery trade in what is now central southern England, and pottery was distributed by boats on the Thames and its tributaries.

Competition for the use of the river created the centuries-old conflict between those who wanted to dam the river to build millraces and fish traps and those who wanted to travel and carry goods on it. Economic prosperity and the foundation of wealthy monasteries by the Anglo-Saxons attracted unwelcome visitors and by around AD 870 the Vikings were sweeping up the Thames on the tide and creating havoc as in their destruction of Chertsey Abbey.

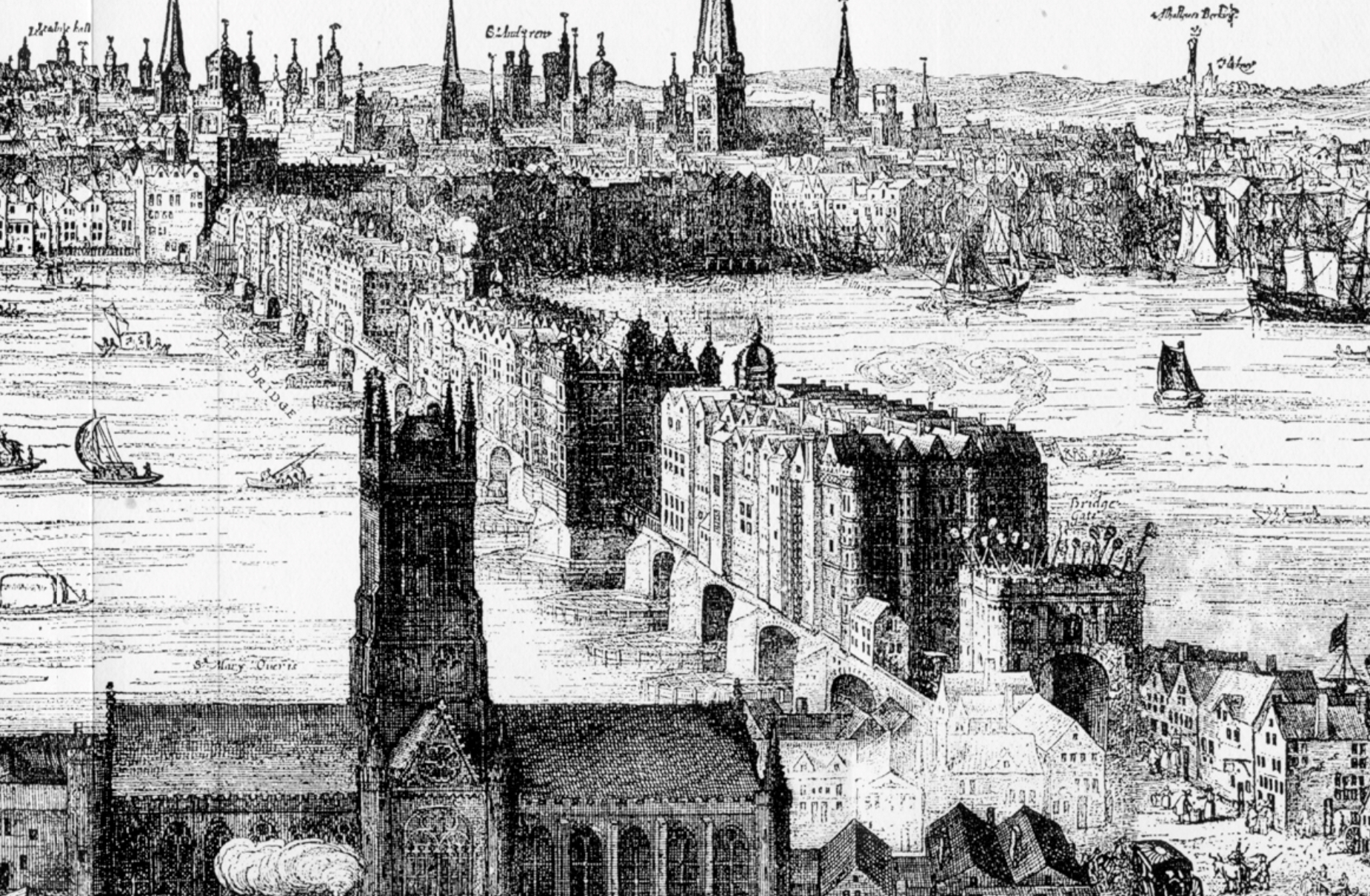
A 1616 engraving by Claes Van Visscher showing the Old London Bridge, with St Mary's Overie (over-the-river), now Southwark Cathedral in the foreground

Once King William had won total control of the strategically important Thames Valley, he went on to invade the rest of England. He had many castles built, including those at Wallingford, Rochester, Windsor and most importantly the Tower of London. Many details of Thames activity are recorded in the Domesday Book. The following centuries saw the conflict between king and barons coming to a head in AD 1215 when King John was forced to grant the Magna Carta by the Thames at Runnymede. Among a host of other things, this granted the barons the right of Navigation under Clause 23.

Another major consequence of John's reign was the completion of the multi-piered London Bridge, which acted as a barricade and barrage on the river, affecting the tidal flow upstream and increasing the likelihood of the river freezing over. In Tudor and Stuart times, various kings and queens built magnificent riverside palaces at Hampton Court, Kew, Richmond on Thames, Whitehall and Greenwich.

As early as the 1300s, the Thames was used to dispose of waste matter produced in the city of London, thus turning the river into an open sewer. In 1357, Edward III described the state of the river in a proclamation: "... dung and other filth had accumulated in divers places upon the banks of the river with ... fumes and other abominable stenches arising therefrom."

The growth of the population of London greatly increased the amount of waste that entered the river, including human excrement, animal waste from slaughter houses, and waste from manufacturing processes. According to historian Peter Ackroyd, "a public lavatory on London Bridge showered its contents directly onto the river below, and latrines were built over all the tributaries that issued into the Thames."

=== Early modern period ===
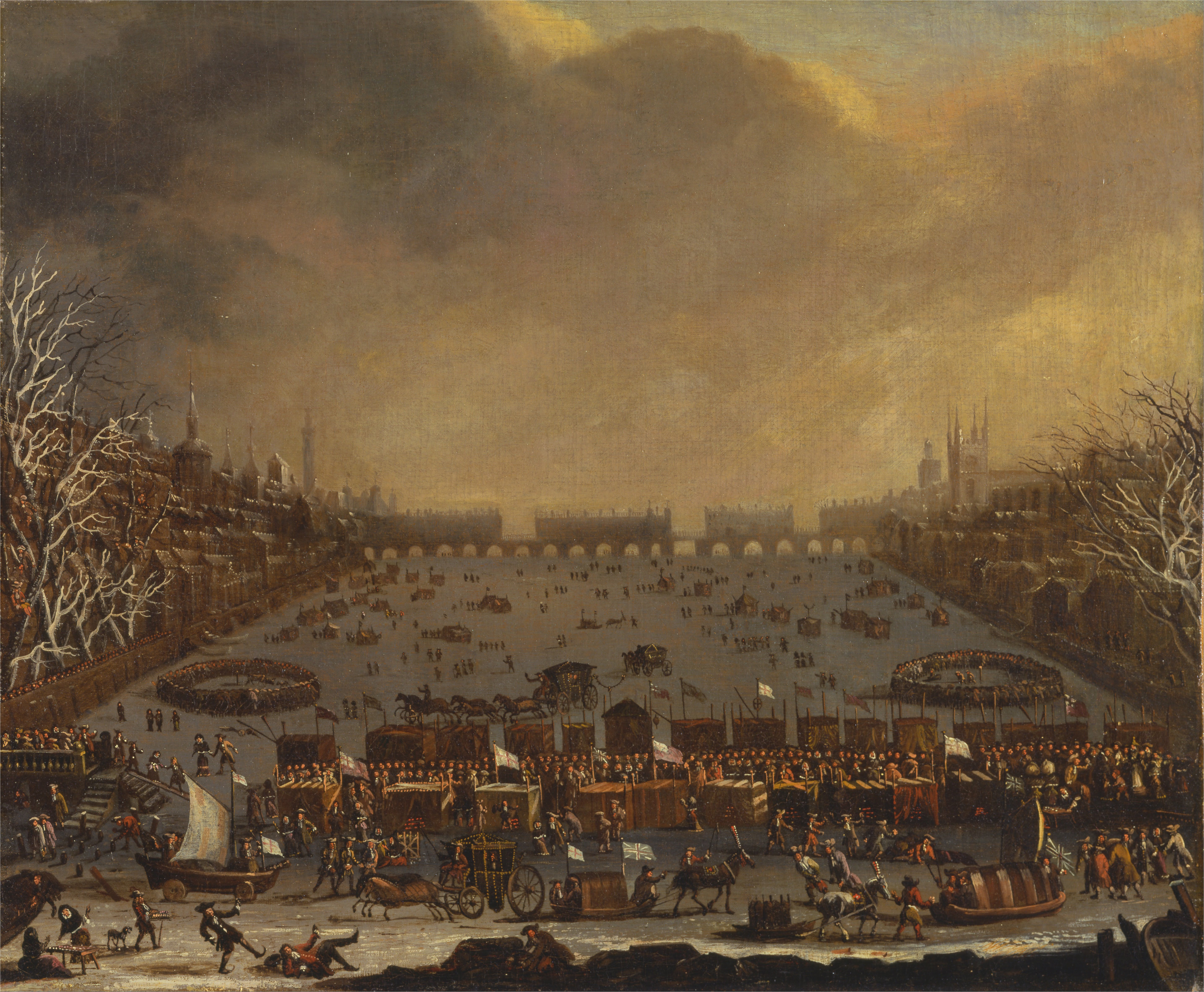
River Thames frost fair, c. 1685

The Stuart monarchs and the City of London organised pageants on the river, including London's Love to Prince Henry in May 1610, and a theatrical sea battle for the Wedding of Princess Elizabeth and Frederick V of the Palatinate in February 1613. During a series of cold winters the Thames froze over above London Bridge: in the first Frost Fair in 1607, a tent city was set up on the river, along with a number of amusements, including ice bowling.

In good conditions, barges travelled daily from Oxford to London carrying timber, wool, foodstuffs and livestock. The stone from the Cotswolds used to rebuild St Paul's Cathedral after the Great Fire in 1666 was brought all the way down from Radcot. The Thames provided the major route between the City of London and Westminster in the 16th and 17th centuries; the clannish guild of watermen ferried Londoners from landing to landing and tolerated no outside interference. In 1715, Thomas Doggett was so grateful to a local waterman for his efforts in ferrying him home, pulling against the tide, that he set up a rowing race for professional watermen known as "Doggett's Coat and Badge".

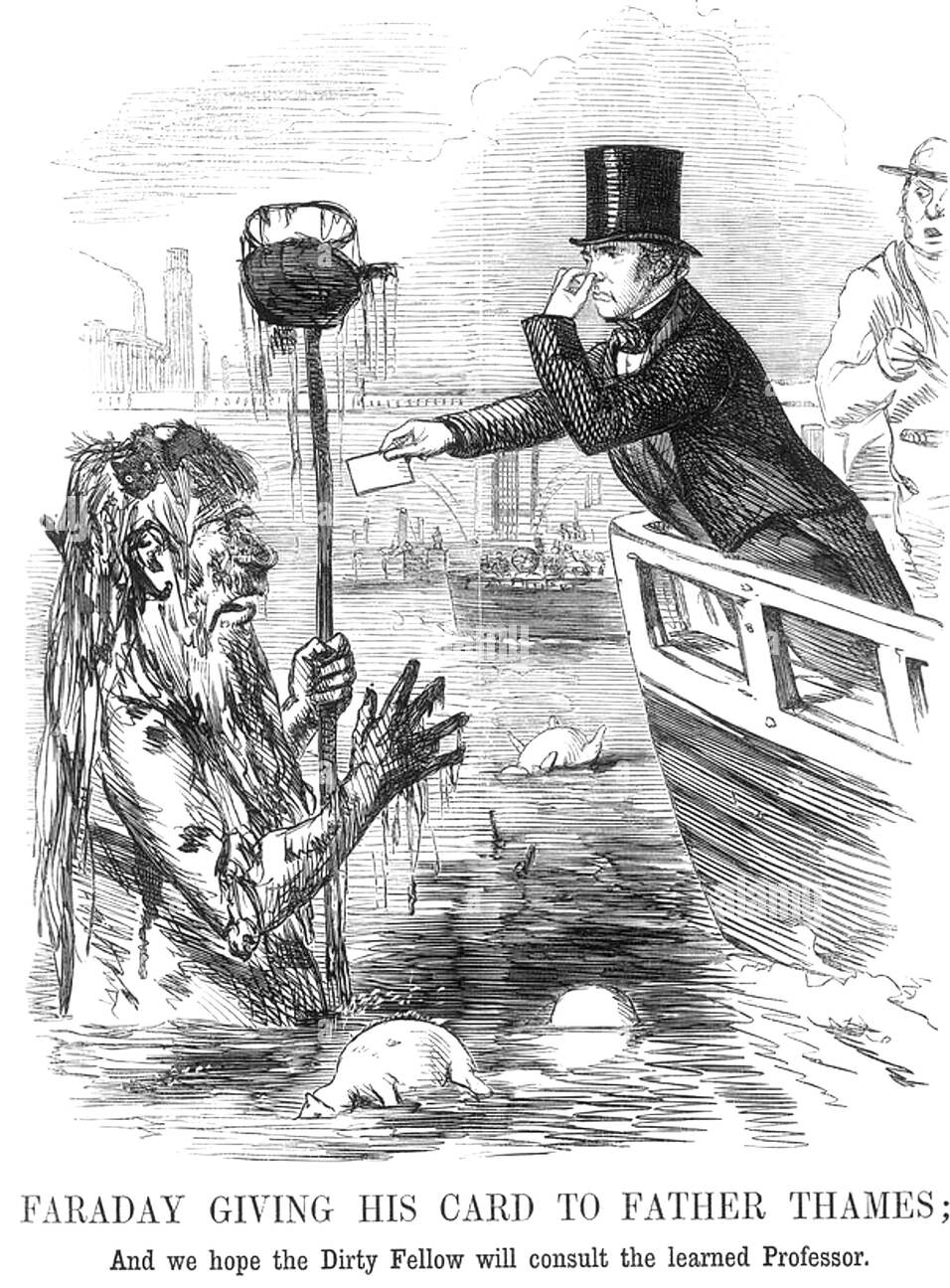
Michael Faraday giving his card to Father Thames, caricature commenting on a letter of Faraday's on the state of the river in The Times in July 1855

By the 18th century, the Thames was one of the world's busiest waterways, as London became the centre of the vast, mercantile British Empire, and progressively over the next century the docks expanded in the Isle of Dogs and beyond. Efforts were made to resolve the navigation conflicts upstream by building locks along the Thames. After temperatures began to rise again, starting in 1814, the river stopped freezing over. The building of a new London Bridge in 1825, with fewer piers (pillars) than the old, allowed the river to flow more freely and prevented it from freezing over in cold winters.

Throughout early modern history the population of London and its industries discarded their rubbish in the river. This included the waste from slaughterhouses, fish markets, and tanneries. The buildup in household cesspools could sometimes overflow, especially when it rained, and was washed into London's streets and sewers which eventually led to the Thames. In the late 18th and 19th centuries people known as mudlarks scavenged in the river mud for a meagre living.

=== Victorian era ===
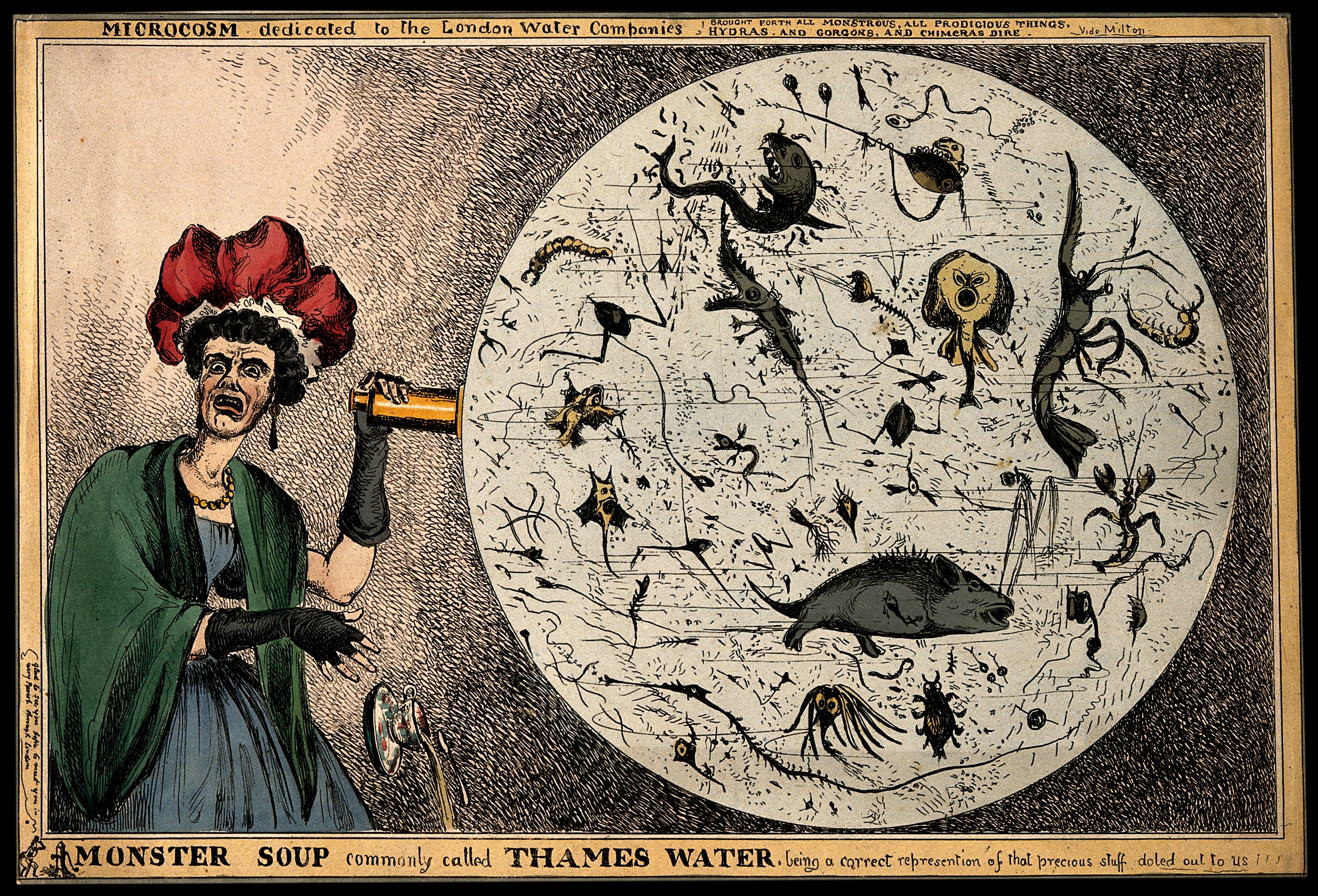
Satirical cartoon by William Heath, showing a woman observing monsters in a drop of London water (at the time of the Commission on the London Water Supply report, 1828)

In the 19th century the quality of water in the Thames deteriorated further. The discharge of raw sewage into the Thames was formerly only common in the City of London, making its tideway a harbour for many harmful bacteria. Gasworks were built alongside the river, and their by-products leaked into the water, including spent lime, ammonia, cyanide, and carbolic acid. The river had an unnaturally warm temperature caused by chemical reactions in the water, which also removed the water's oxygen. Four serious cholera outbreaks killed tens of thousands of people between 1832 and 1865. Historians have attributed Prince Albert's death in 1861 to typhoid that had spread in the river's dirty waters beside Windsor Castle. Wells with water tables that mixed with tributaries (or the non-tidal Thames) faced such pollution with the widespread installation of the flush toilet in the 1850s. In the 'Great Stink' of 1858, pollution in the river reached such an extreme that sittings of the House of Commons at Westminster had to be abandoned. Chlorine-soaked drapes were hung in the windows of Parliament in an attempt to stave off the smell of the river, but to no avail.

There followed a concerted effort to contain the city's sewage by constructing massive sewer systems on the north and south river embankments, under the supervision of engineer Joseph Bazalgette. Meanwhile, there were similar huge projects to ensure the water supply: reservoirs and pumping stations were built on the river to the west of London, slowly helping the quality of water to improve. The Victorian era was one of imaginative engineering. The coming of the railways added railway bridges to the earlier road bridges and also reduced commercial activity on the river.

The Victorian period was a time of increasing leisure on the waterway. From the early nineteenth century onwards, thousands of Londoners flocked to estuary resorts, such as Southend-on-Sea and Gravesend. One of the worst river disasters in England was on 3 September 1878, when the crowded pleasure boat Princess Alice collided in the Thames estuary with the Bywell Castle, killing over 640 people. On the non-tidal river, sporting and leisure use increased with the establishment of regattas such as Henley and the Boat Race.

The late Victorian period is sometimes called "the golden age of the Thames", as it was when thousands of people flocked to the fashionable riverside resorts west of London to enjoy boat outings, steam launch trips, regattas and carnivals. Recreational camping in the UK was also first popularised on the waterway during this period.

Around 1851: the banks of the Thames in London from Parliament and Westminster Abbey to Greenwich. (Owned by Friedenstein Stiftung Gotha, Germany)

=== 20th century ===
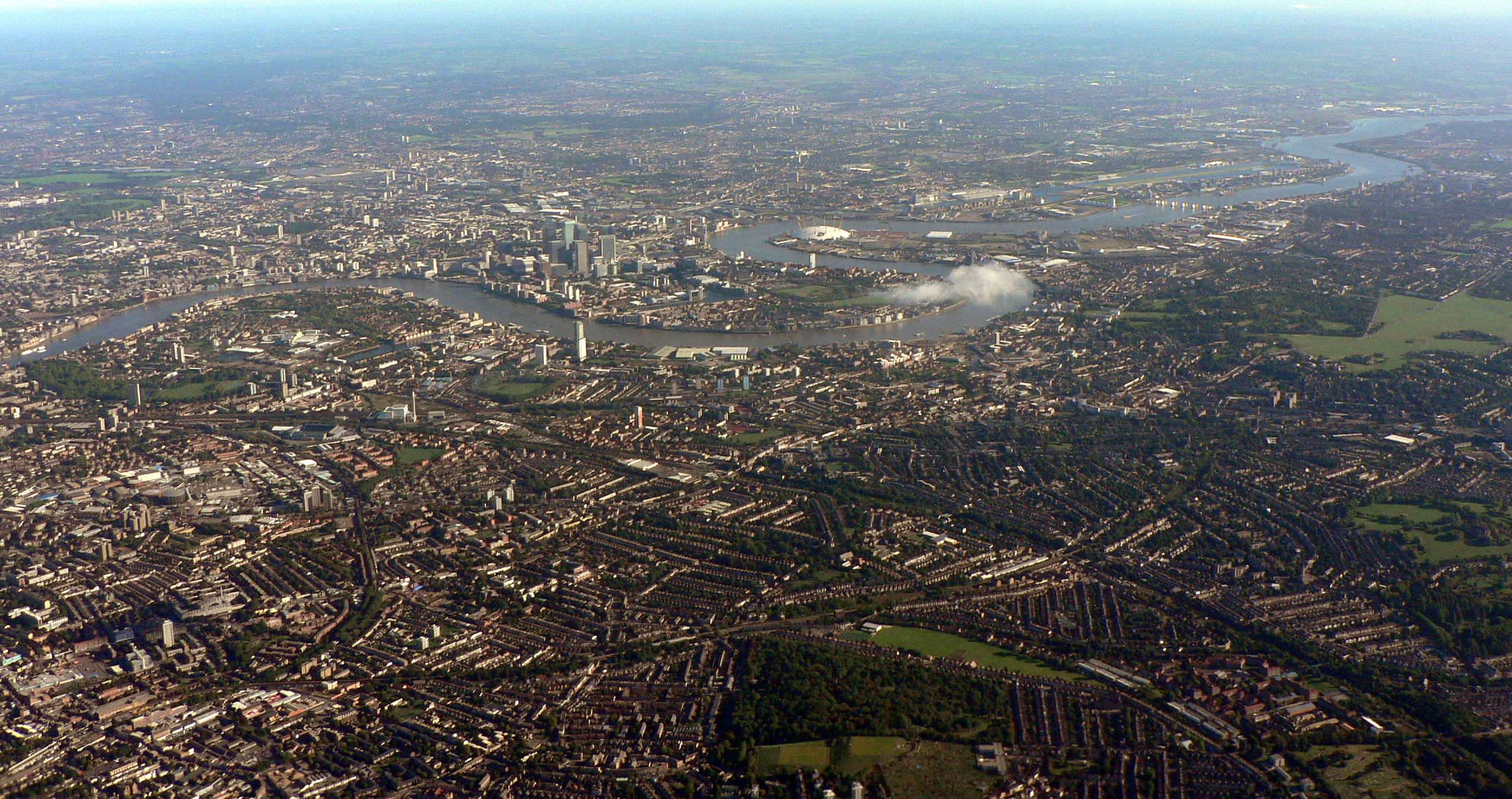
The Thames as it flows through east London, with the Isle of Dogs in the centre

The growth of road transport, and the decline of the Empire in the years following 1914, reduced the economic prominence of the river. During the Second World War, the protection of certain Thames-side facilities, particularly docks and water treatment plants, was crucial to the munitions and water supply of the country. The river's defences included the Maunsell forts in the estuary, and the use of barrage balloons to counter German bombers using the reflectivity and shapes of the river to navigate during the Blitz.

In the post-war era, although the Port of London remains one of the UK's three main ports, most trade has moved downstream from central London. In the late 1950s, the discharge of methane gas in the depths of the river caused the water to bubble, and the toxins wore away at boats' propellers.

The decline of heavy industry and tanneries, reduced use of oil-pollutants and improved sewage treatment have led to much better water quality compared to the late 19th and early- to mid-20th centuries and aquatic life has returned to its formerly 'dead' stretches.

Alongside the entire river runs the Thames Path, a National Route for walkers and cyclists.

In the early 1980s a pioneering flood control device, the Thames Barrier, was opened. It is closed to tides several times a year to prevent water damage to London's low-lying areas upstream (the 1928 Thames flood demonstrated the severity of this type of event).

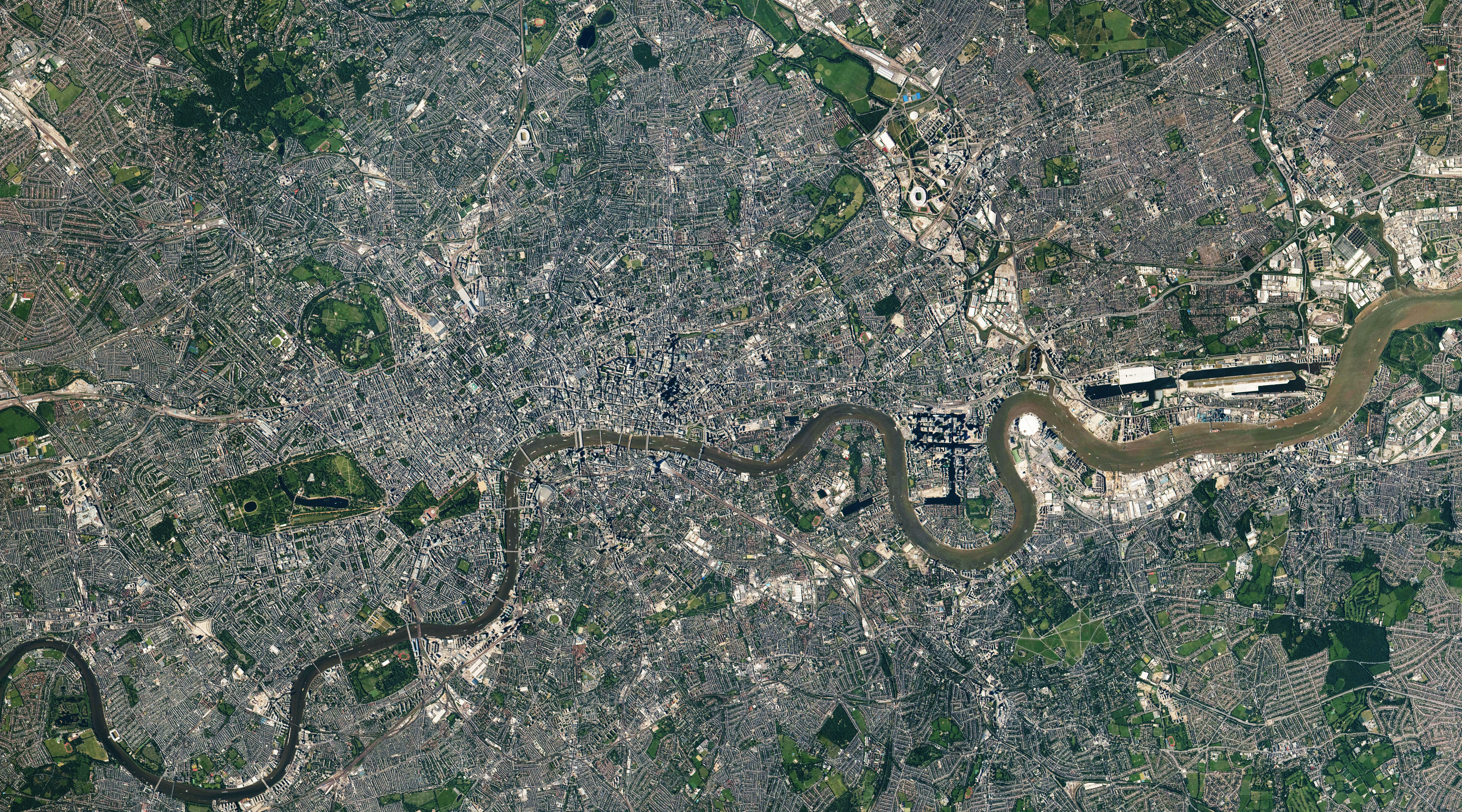
A view of the Thames as it passes through London, composed of 29 photos taken from the ISS in 2021

In the late 1990s, the 7 mi (11 km) long Jubilee River was built as a wide "naturalistic" flood relief channel from Taplow to Eton to help reduce the flood risk in Maidenhead, Windsor and Eton, although it appears to have increased flooding in the villages immediately downstream.

=== 21st century ===
In 2010, the Thames won the largest environmental award in the world: the $350,000 International Riverprize.

In August 2022, the first few miles of the river dried up due to the previous month's heatwave, and the source of the river temporarily moved five miles to beyond Somerford Keynes.

== The active river ==
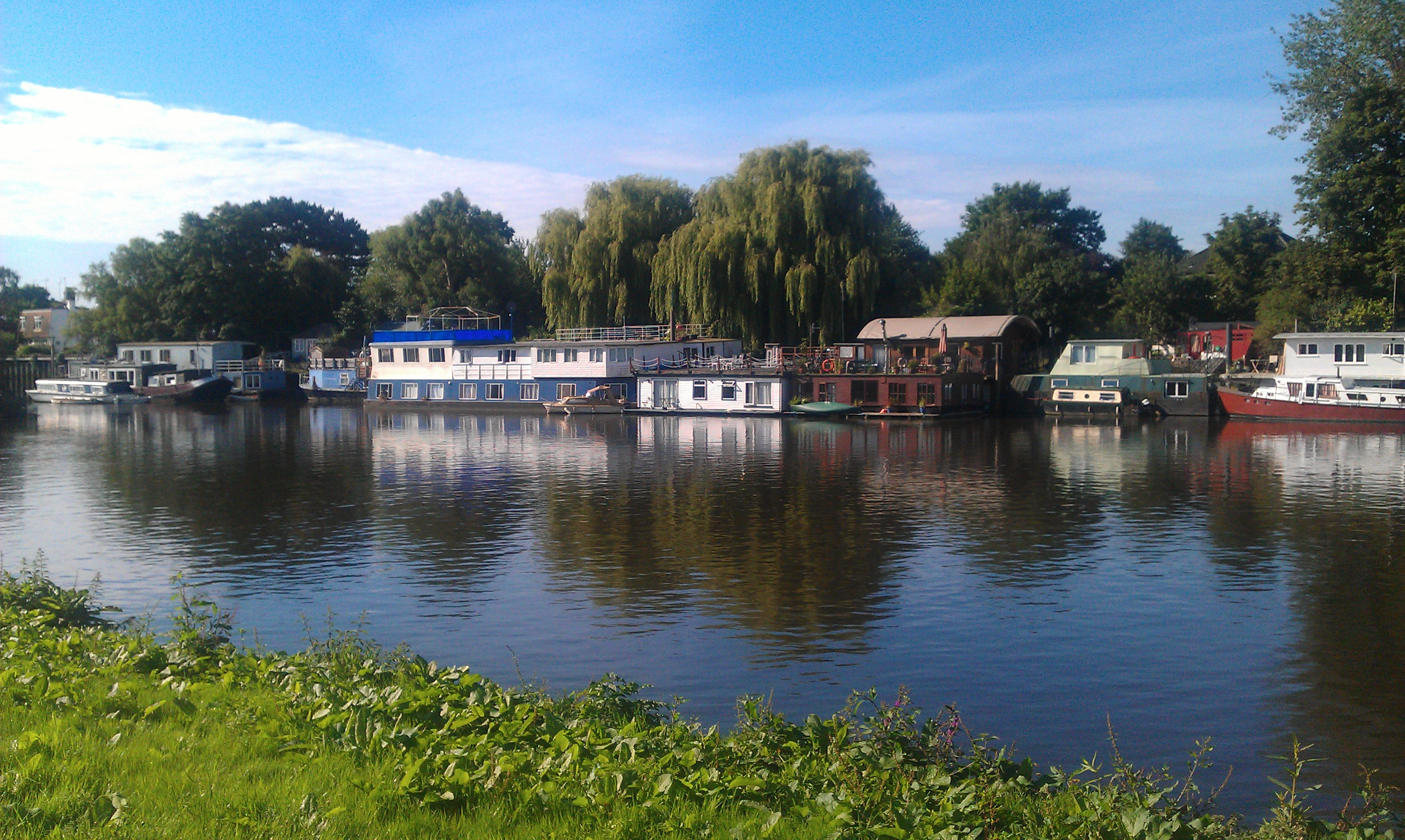
Houseboats on the River Thames, in the St Margaret's, Twickenham district

One of the major resources provided by the Thames is the water distributed as drinking water by Thames Water, whose area of responsibility covers the length of the River Thames. The Thames Water Ring Main is the main distribution mechanism for water in London, with one major loop linking the Hampton, Walton, Ashford and Kempton Park Water Treatment Works with central London.

In the past, commercial activities on the Thames included fishing (particularly eel trapping), coppicing willows and osiers which provided wood and baskets, and the operation of watermills for flour and paper production and metal beating. These activities have largely disappeared.

The Thames is popular for a wide variety of riverside housing, including high-rise flats in central London and chalets on the banks and islands upstream. Some people live in houseboats, typically around Brentford and Tagg's Island.

=== Transport and tourism ===
==== Tidal river ====
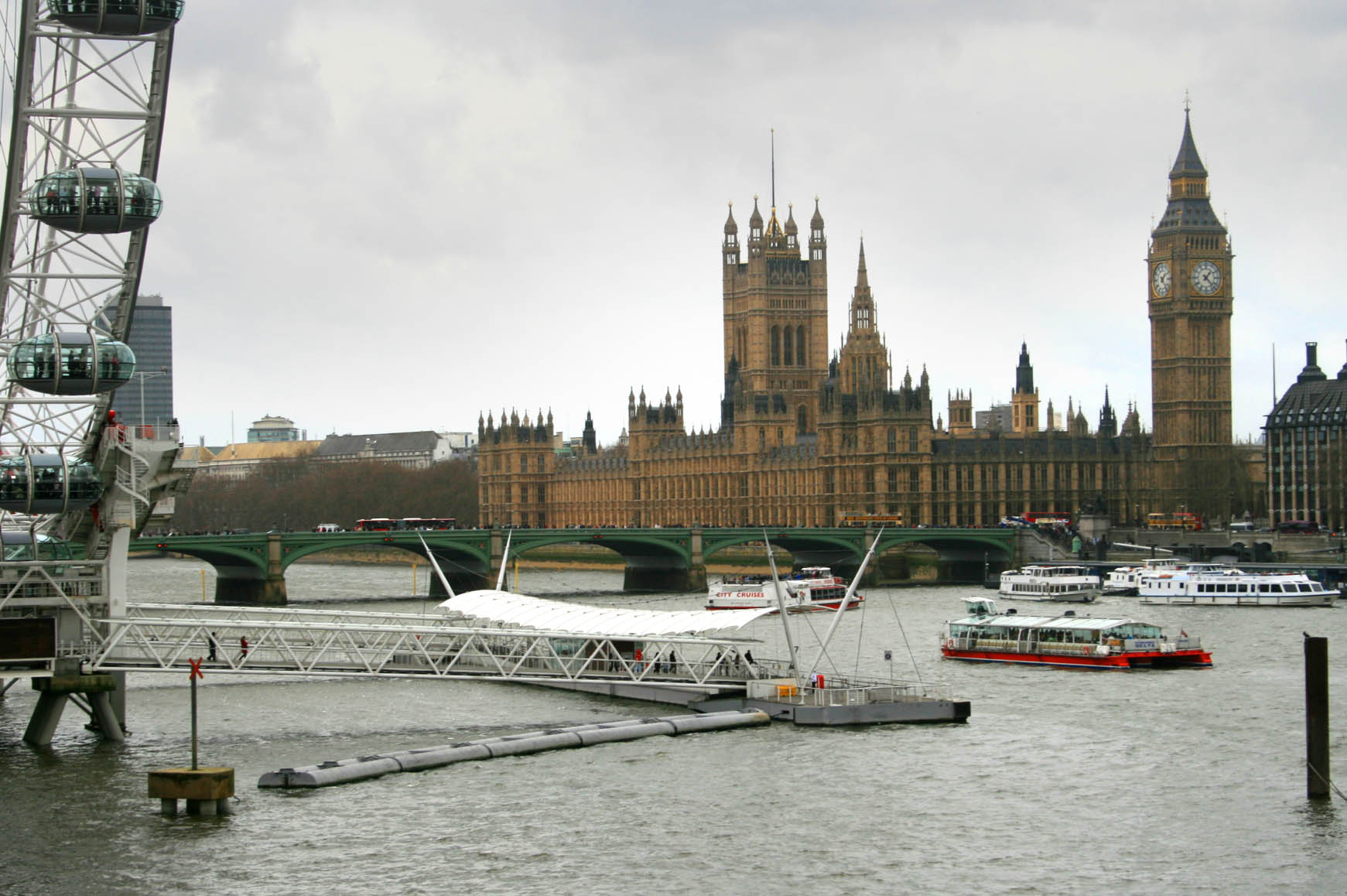
Passenger service on the River Thames

In London there are many sightseeing tours in tourist boats, past riverside attractions such as the Houses of Parliament and the Tower of London. There are also regular riverboat services co-ordinated by London River Services. London City Airport is situated on the Thames, in East London. Previously it was a dock.

==== Upper river ====
The leisure navigation and sporting activities on the river have given rise to a number of businesses including boatbuilding, marinas, ships chandlers and salvage services.

In summer, passenger services operate along the entire non-tidal river between Oxford and Teddington. The two largest operators are Salters Steamers and French Brothers. Salters operate services between Staines and Folly Bridge in Oxford. The whole journey takes four days and requires several changes of boat. French Brothers operate passenger services between Maidenhead and Hampton Court. Along the course of the river a number of smaller private companies also offer river trips at Oxford, Wallingford, Reading and Hampton Court. Many companies also provide boat hire on the river.

==== Cable car ====
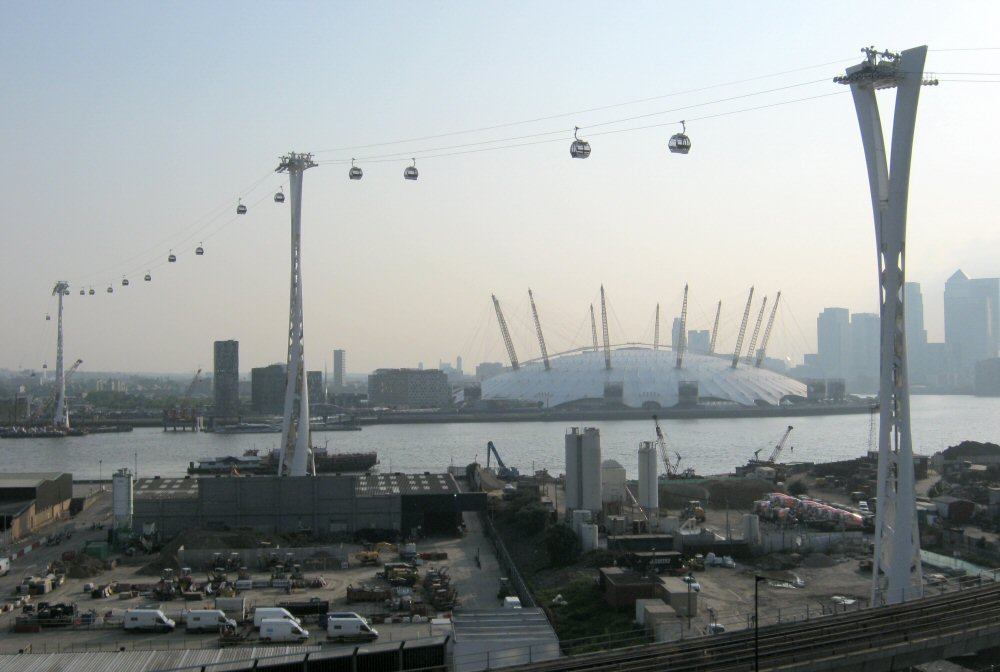
The London Cable Car, over the River Thames

The London Cable Car over the Thames from the Greenwich Peninsula to the Royal Docks has been in operation since the 2012 Summer Olympics.

=== Police and lifeboats ===
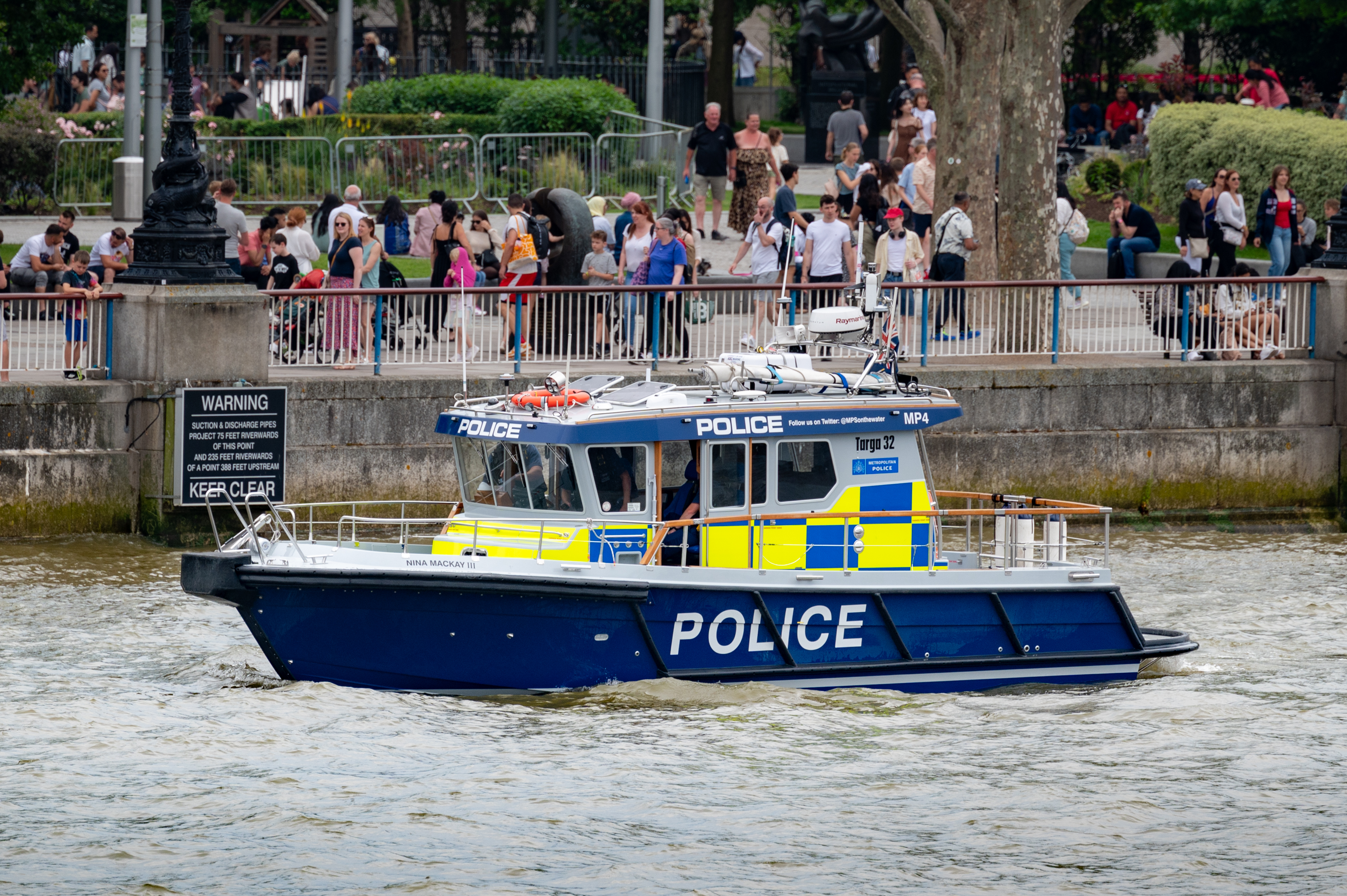
Metropolitan Marine Policing Unit patrol vessel, Nina Mackay III, on the Thames River in London

The river is policed by five police forces. The Thames Division is the River Police arm of London's Metropolitan Police, while Surrey Police, Thames Valley Police, Essex Police and Kent Police have responsibilities on their parts of the river outside the metropolitan area. There is also a London Fire Brigade fire boat on the river. The river claims a number of lives each year.

As a result of the Marchioness disaster in 1989 when 51 people died, the Government asked the Maritime and Coastguard Agency, the Port of London Authority and the Royal National Lifeboat Institution (RNLI) to work together to set up a dedicated Search and Rescue service for the tidal River Thames. As a result, there are four lifeboat stations on the River Thames: at Teddington, Chiswick, Tower (based at Victoria Embankment/Waterloo Bridge) and Gravesend.

=== Navigation ===
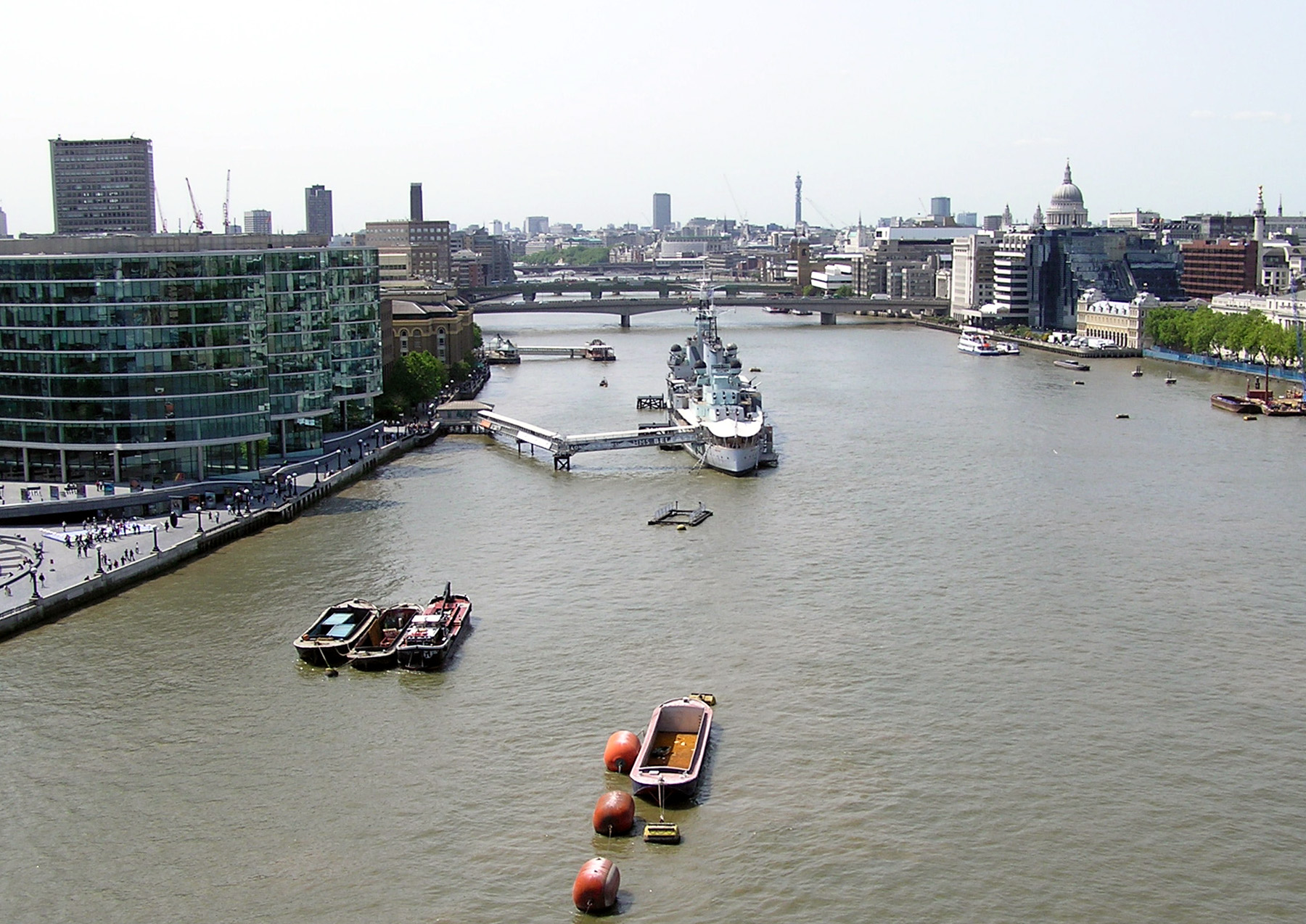
Pool of London looking west, from the high-level walkway on Tower Bridge

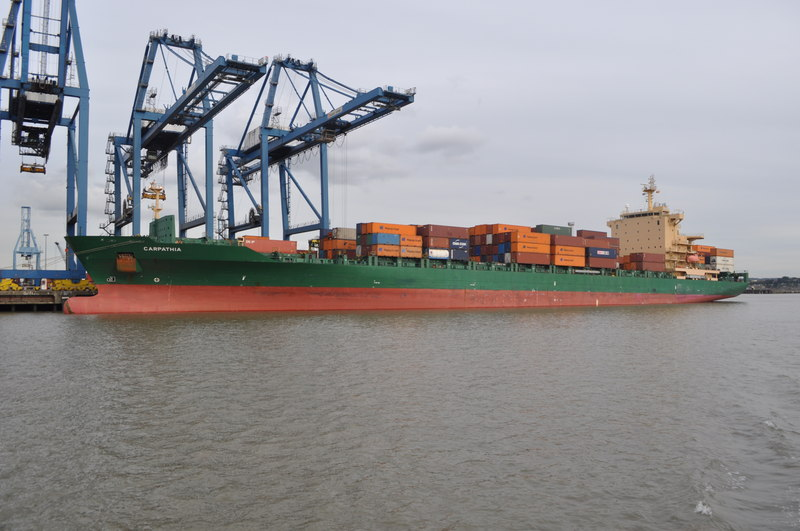
A container ship unloading at Northfleet Hope terminal, Tilbury

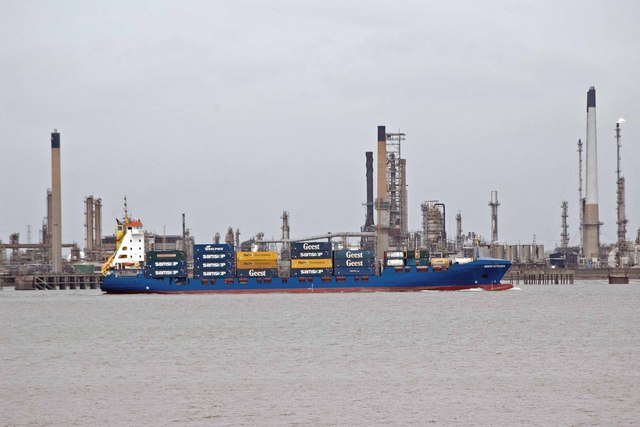
A ship heading downstream past Coryton Refinery

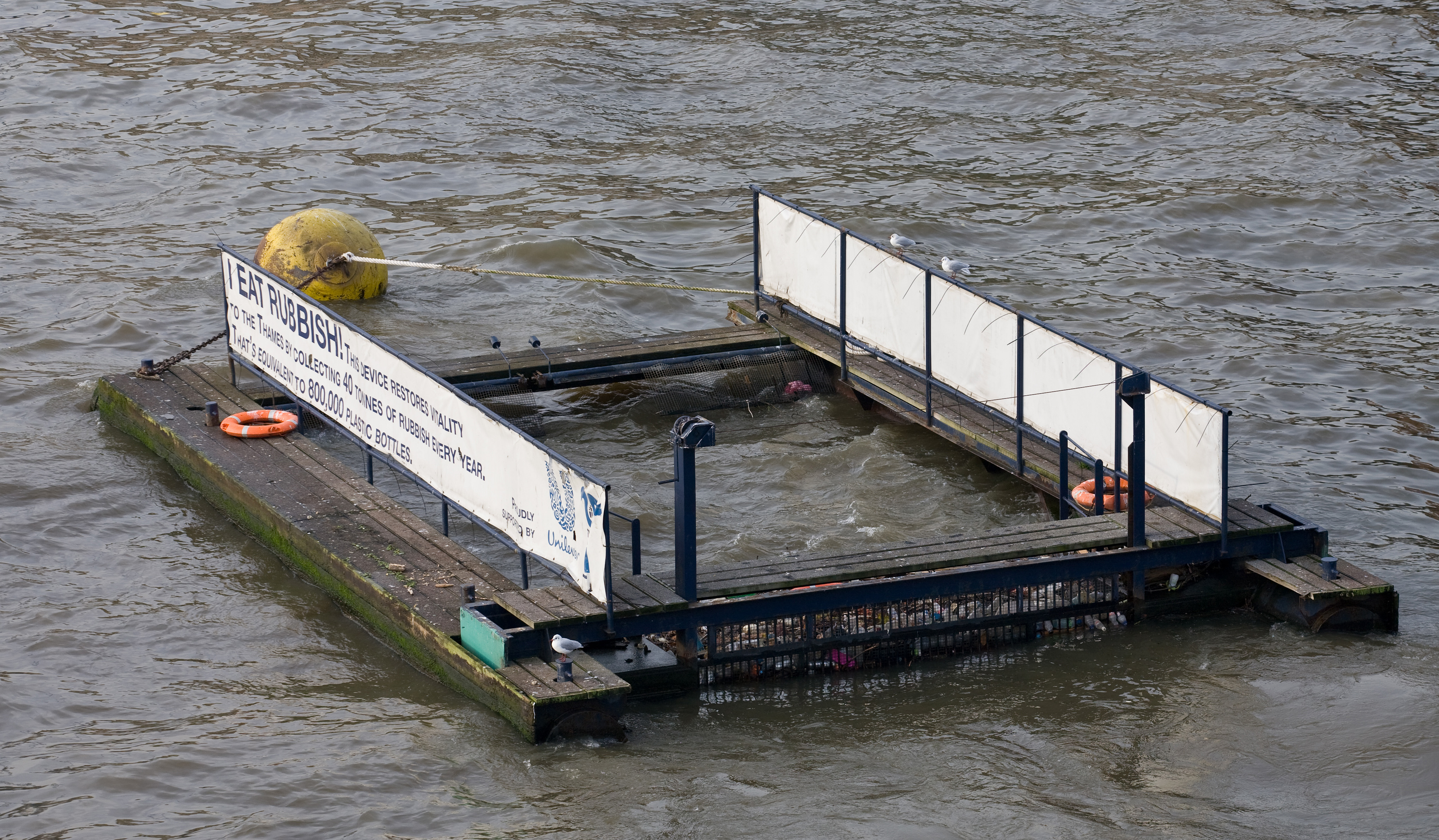
Rubbish traps are used on the Thames to filter debris as it flows through central London.

The Thames is maintained for navigation by powered craft from the estuary as far as Lechlade in Gloucestershire and for very small craft to Cricklade. The original towpath extends upstream from Putney Bridge as far as the connection with the now disused Thames and Severn Canal at Inglesham, one and a half miles upstream of the last boat lock near Lechlade. From Teddington Lock to the head of navigation, the navigation authority is the Environment Agency. Between the sea and Teddington Lock, the river forms part of the Port of London and navigation is administered by the Port of London Authority. Both the tidal river through London and the non-tidal river upstream are intensively used for leisure navigation.

The non-tidal River Thames is divided into reaches by the 45 locks. The locks are staffed for the greater part of the day, but can be operated by experienced users out of hours. This part of the Thames links to existing navigations at the River Wey Navigation, the River Kennet and the Oxford Canal. All craft using it must be licensed. The Environment Agency has patrol boats (named after tributaries of the Thames) and can enforce the limit strictly since river traffic usually has to pass through a lock at some stage. A speed limit of 8 km/h (4.3 kn) applies. There are pairs of transit markers at various points along the non-tidal river that can be used to check speed – a boat travelling legally taking a minute or more to pass between the two markers.

The tidal river is navigable to large ocean-going ships as far upstream as the Pool of London and London Bridge. Although London's upstream enclosed docks have closed and central London sees only the occasional visiting cruise ship or warship, the tidal river remains one of Britain's main ports. Around 60 active terminals cater for shipping of all types including ro-ro ferries, cruise liners and vessels carrying containers, vehicles, timber, grain, paper, crude oil, petroleum products, liquified petroleum gas etc. There is a regular traffic of aggregate or refuse vessels, operating from wharves in the west of London. The tidal Thames links to the canal network at the River Lea Navigation, the Regent's Canal at Limehouse Basin and the Grand Union Canal at Brentford.

Upstream of Wandsworth Bridge a speed limit of 8 kn (15 km/h) is in force for powered craft to protect the riverbank environment and to provide safe conditions for rowers and other river users. There is no absolute speed limit on most of the Tideway downstream of Wandsworth Bridge, although boats are not allowed to create undue wash. Powered boats are limited to 12 knots between Lambeth Bridge and downstream of Tower Bridge, with some exceptions. Boats can be approved by the harbourmaster to travel at speeds of up to 30 knots from below Tower Bridge to past the Thames Barrier.

==== Management ====
The administrative powers of the Thames Conservancy to control river traffic and manage flows have been taken on with some modifications by the Environment Agency and, in respect of the Tideway part of the river, such powers are split between the agency and the Port of London Authority.

In the Middle Ages the Crown exercised general jurisdiction over the Thames, one of the four royal rivers, and appointed water bailiffs to oversee the river upstream of Staines. The City of London exercised jurisdiction over the tidal Thames. However, navigation was increasingly impeded by weirs and mills, and in the 14th century the river probably ceased to be navigable for heavy traffic between Henley and Oxford. In the late 16th century the river seems to have been reopened for navigation from Henley to Burcot.

The first commission concerned with the management of the river was the Oxford-Burcot Commission, formed in 1605 to make the river navigable between Burcot and Oxford.

In 1751 the Thames Navigation Commission was formed to manage the whole non-tidal river above Staines. The City of London long claimed responsibility for the tidal river. A long running dispute between the City and the Crown over ownership of the river was not settled until 1857, when the Thames Conservancy was formed to manage the river from Staines downstream. In 1866 the functions of the Thames Navigation Commission were transferred to the Thames Conservancy, which thus had responsibility for the whole river.

In 1909 the powers of the Thames Conservancy over the tidal river, below Teddington, were transferred to the Port of London Authority.

In 1974 the Thames Conservancy became part of the new Thames Water Authority. When Thames Water was privatised in 1990, its river management functions were transferred to the National Rivers Authority, in 1996 subsumed into the Environment Agency.

In 2010, the Thames won the world's largest environmental award at the time, the $350,000 International Riverprize, presented at the International Riversymposium in Perth, WA in recognition of the substantial and sustained restoration of the river by many hundreds of organisations and individuals since the 1950s.

=== As a boundary ===
Until enough crossings were established, the river presented a formidable barrier, with Belgic tribes and Anglo-Saxon kingdoms being defined by which side of the river they were on. When English counties were established, their boundaries were partly determined by the Thames. On the northern bank were the ancient counties of Gloucestershire, Oxfordshire, Buckinghamshire, Middlesex and Essex. On the southern bank were the counties of Wiltshire, Berkshire, Surrey and Kent.

Counting bridges to the far bank or to an island connected to such, the Thames has 223. From source to mouth a channel can be found with 138 bridges, plus the temporary footbridge often added during Reading Festival. The river is heavily splayed in Ashton Keynes and Oxford. Where the river is wide, 17 tunnels have been built; many of these are for rail or notable electricity cables. The crossings have changed the dynamics and made cross-river development and shared responsibilities more practicable. In 1965, upon the creation of Greater London, the London Borough of Richmond upon Thames included both the former "Middlesex" and "Surrey" banks, Spelthorne was transferred from Middlesex to Surrey; and further changes in 1974 moved some of the boundaries away from the river. For example, some areas were transferred from Berkshire to Oxfordshire, and others from Buckinghamshire to Berkshire. In many river sports and traditions – for example in rowing – the banks are referred to by their historical county names.

=== Crossings ===
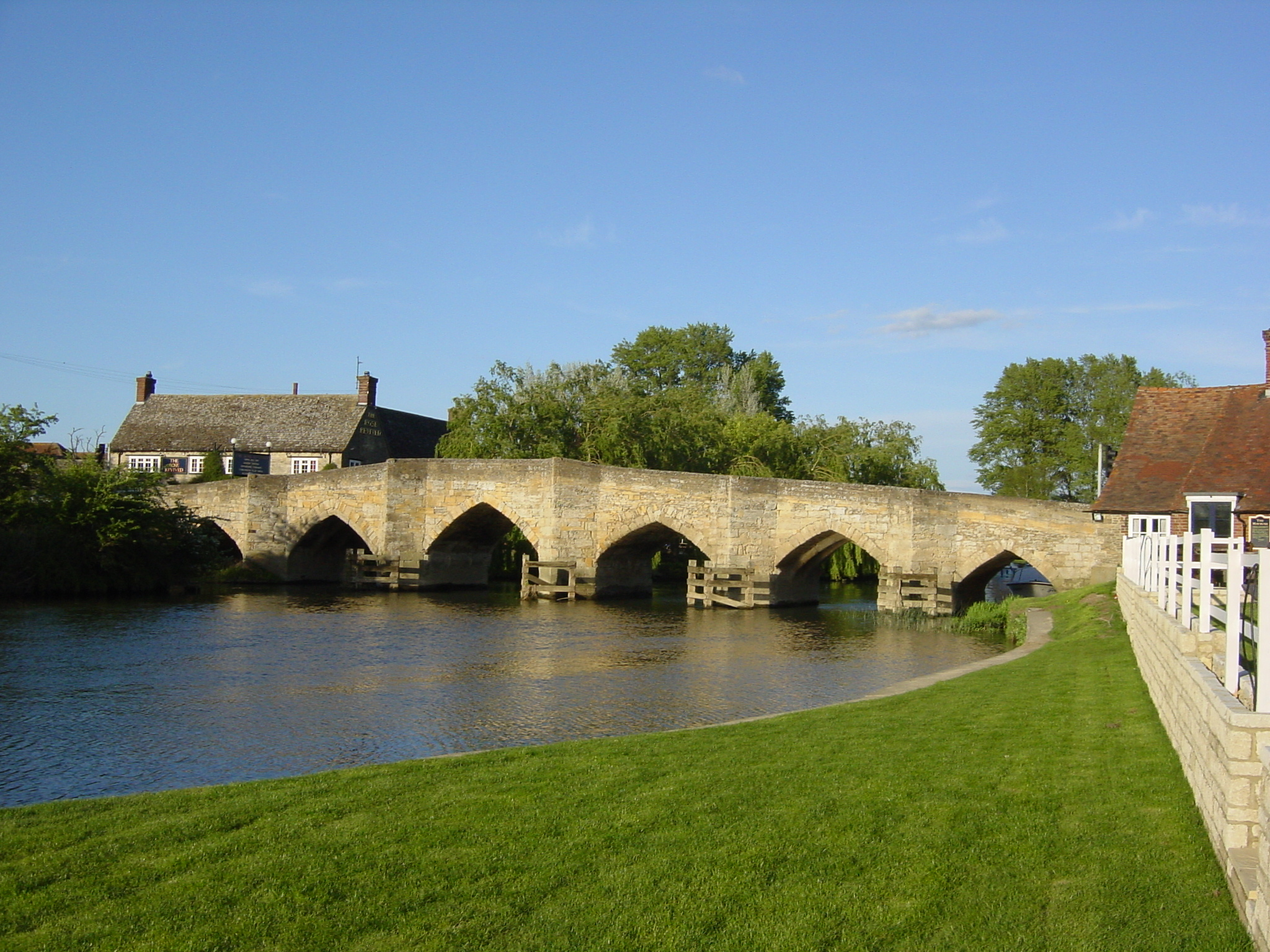
Newbridge, in rural Oxfordshire

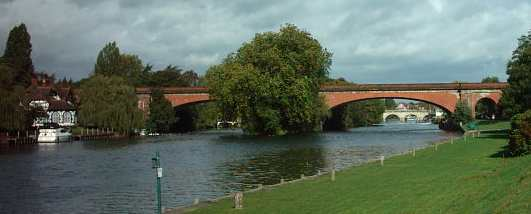
The Railway bridge at Maidenhead

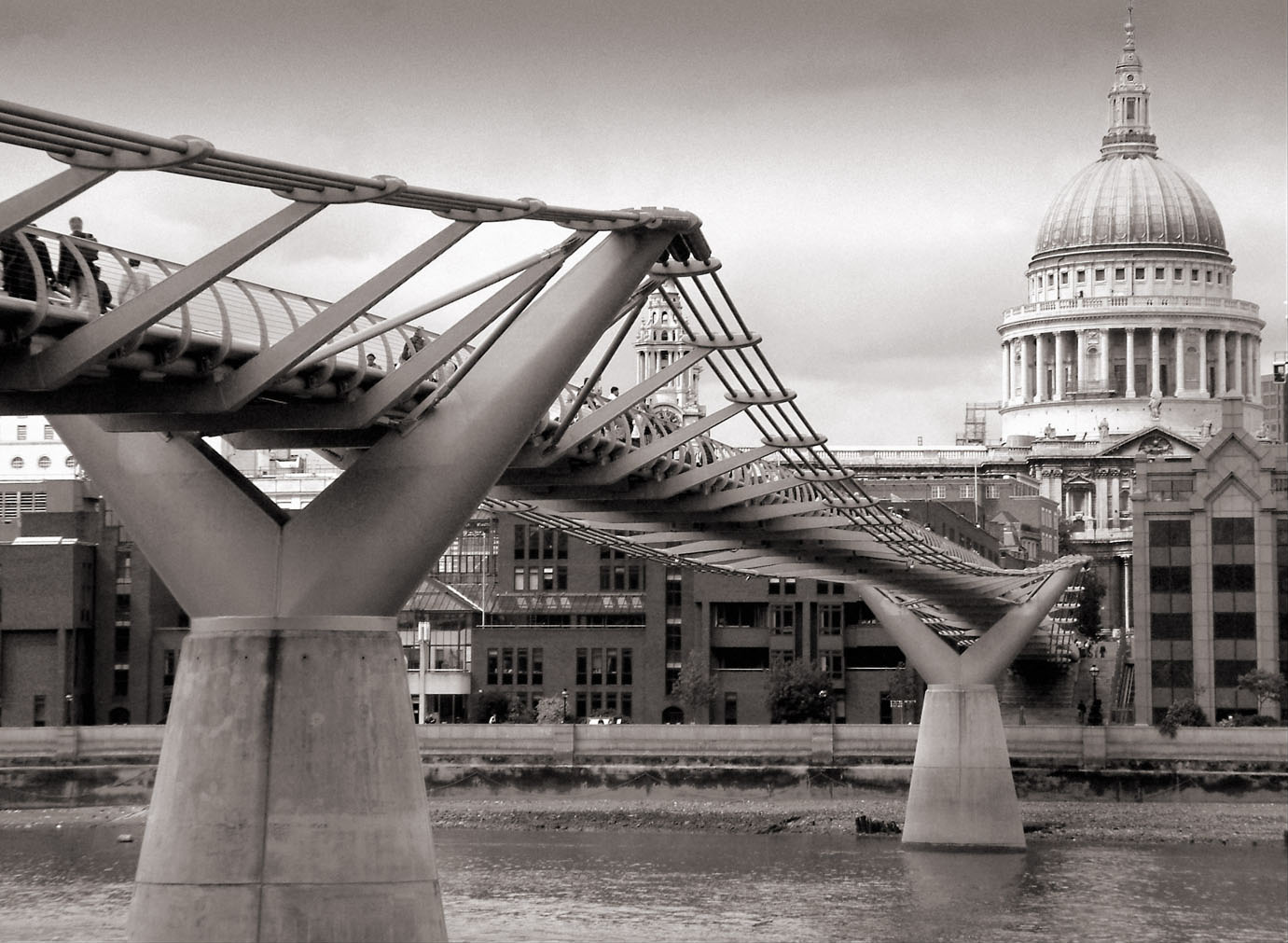
The Millennium Footbridge with St Paul's Cathedral in the background

Many of the present-day road bridges are on the sites of earlier fords, ferries and wooden bridges. Swinford Bridge, known as the five pence toll bridge, replaced a ferry that in turn replaced a ford. The earliest known major crossings of the Thames by the Romans were at London Bridge and Staines Bridge. At Folly Bridge in Oxford the remains of an original Saxon structure can be seen, and medieval stone bridges such as Newbridge, Wallingford Bridge and Abingdon Bridge are still in use.

Kingston's growth is believed to stem from its having the only crossing between London Bridge and Staines until the beginning of the 18th century. During the 18th century, many stone and brick road bridges were built from new or to replace existing bridges both in London and along the length of the river. These included Putney Bridge, Westminster Bridge, Datchet Bridge, Windsor Bridge and Sonning Bridge.

Several central London road bridges were built in the 19th century, most conspicuously Tower Bridge, the only bascule bridge on the river, designed to allow ocean-going ships to pass beneath it. The most recent road bridges are the bypasses at Isis Bridge and Marlow By-pass Bridge and the motorway bridges, most notably the two on the M25 route: Queen Elizabeth II Bridge and M25 Runnymede Bridge.

Railway development in the 19th century resulted in a spate of bridge building, including Blackfriars Railway Bridge and Charing Cross (Hungerford) Railway Bridge in central London, and the railway bridges by Isambard Kingdom Brunel at Maidenhead Railway Bridge, Gatehampton Railway Bridge and Moulsford Railway Bridge.

The world's first underwater tunnel was Marc Brunel's Thames Tunnel built in 1843 and now used to carry the East London Line. The Tower Subway was the first railway under the Thames, which was followed by all the deep-level tube lines. Road tunnels were built in East London at the end of the 19th century, being the Blackwall Tunnel and the Rotherhithe Tunnel. The latest tunnels are the Dartford Crossings.

Many foot crossings were established across the weirs that were built on the non-tidal river, and some of these remained when the locks were built – for example at Benson Lock. Others were replaced by a footbridge when the weir was removed, as at Hart's Weir Footbridge. Around 2000, several footbridges were added along the Thames, either as part of the Thames Path or in commemoration of the millennium. These include Temple Footbridge, Bloomers Hole Footbridge, the Hungerford Footbridges and the Millennium Bridge, all of which have distinctive design characteristics.

Before bridges were built, the main means of crossing the river was by ferry. A significant number of ferries were provided specifically for navigation purposes. When the towpath changed sides, it was necessary to take the towing horse and its driver across the river. This was no longer necessary when barges were powered by steam. Some ferries still operate on the river. The Woolwich Ferry carries cars and passengers across the river in the Thames Gateway and links the North Circular and South Circular roads. Upstream are smaller pedestrian ferries, for example Hampton Ferry and Shepperton to Weybridge Ferry, the last being the only non-permanent crossing that remains on the Thames Path.

=== Hydro-power ===
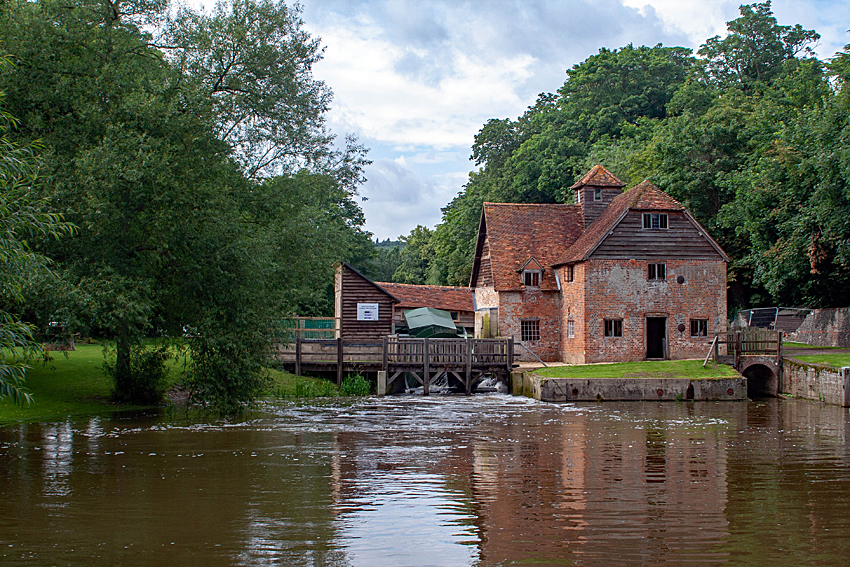
Mapledurham mill and turbine

Whilst the use of the river to drive water-mills has largely died out, there has been a recent trend to use the head of water provided by the river's existing weirs to drive small hydro-electric power plants, using Archimedes screw turbines. Operational schemes include:

- A privately owned plant opened at Mapledurham Watermill in 2011, running in parallel to the waterwheel driven corn mill that still operates occasionally.
- A hydro-electric plant at Romney Lock to power Windsor Castle using two Archimedes' screws, opened in 2013 by Queen Elizabeth II.
- Osney Lock Hydro, a community owned scheme at Osney Lock in Oxford, also opened in 2013.
- Sandford Hydro, a community owned scheme at Sandford Lock to the south of Oxford, opened in 2017.
- Reading Hydro, a community owned scheme at Caversham Lock in Reading, opened in 2021.

== Pollution ==
=== Treated and untreated sewage ===
Treated waste water from all the towns and villages in the Thames catchment flow into the Thames via sewage treatment plants. This includes all that from Swindon, Oxford, Berkshire and almost all of Surrey.

However, untreated sewage still often enters the Thames during wet weather. When London's sewerage system was built, sewers were designed to overflow through discharge points along the river during heavy storms. Originally, this would happen once or twice a year; however, overflows now happen once a week on average. In 2013, over 55m tonnes of dilute raw sewage overflowed into the tidal Thames. These discharge events kill fish, leave raw sewage on the riverbanks, and decrease the water quality of the river. A 2022 investigation by the Environment Agency found "widespread and serious non-compliance with the relevant regulations". Thames Water has also published an interactive map showing discharges as they happen.

To reduce the release of this into the river, the Thames Tideway Scheme was constructed at a cost of £5 billion. It was completed in February 2025 after delays and additional costs because of the COVID-19 Pandemic. This project collects sewage from the Greater London area before it overflows, channelling it down a 25 km (15 mi) tunnel underneath the tidal Thames, so that it can be treated at Beckton Sewage Treatment Works. The project is intended to reduce sewage discharges into the Thames in the Greater London area by 90%, dramatically increasing water quality. It is estimated that two million tonnes of sewage will still enter the Thames each year.

=== Mercury levels ===
Mercury (Hg) is an environmentally persistent heavy metal which can be toxic to marine life and humans. Sixty sediment cores of 1 m in depth, spanning the entire tidal River Thames between Brentford and the Isle of Grain, have been analysed for total Hg. The sediment records show a clear rise and fall of Hg pollution through history. Mercury concentrations in the River Thames decrease downstream from London to the outer Estuary, with the total Hg levels ranging from 0.01 to 12.07 mg/kg, giving a mean of 2.10 mg/kg which is higher than many other UK and European river estuaries.

The most sedimentary-hosted Hg pollution in the Thames estuary occurs in the central London area between Vauxhall Bridge and Woolwich. The majority of sediment cores show a clear decrease in Hg concentrations close to the surface, which is attributed to an overall reduction in polluting activities as well as improved effectiveness of recent environmental legalisation and river management (e.g. Oslo-Paris convention).

=== Plastic pollution ===
The Thames has relatively high levels of plastic pollution, with an estimated 94,000 microplastics per second moving through some parts of the river. These microplastics come from the breakdown of larger items but also glitter and microbeads from cosmetics. One study found one-fifth of macroplastics found in the river were from food packaging.

== Sport ==
There are several watersports prevalent on the Thames, with many clubs encouraging participation and organising racing and inter-club competitions.

=== Rowing ===
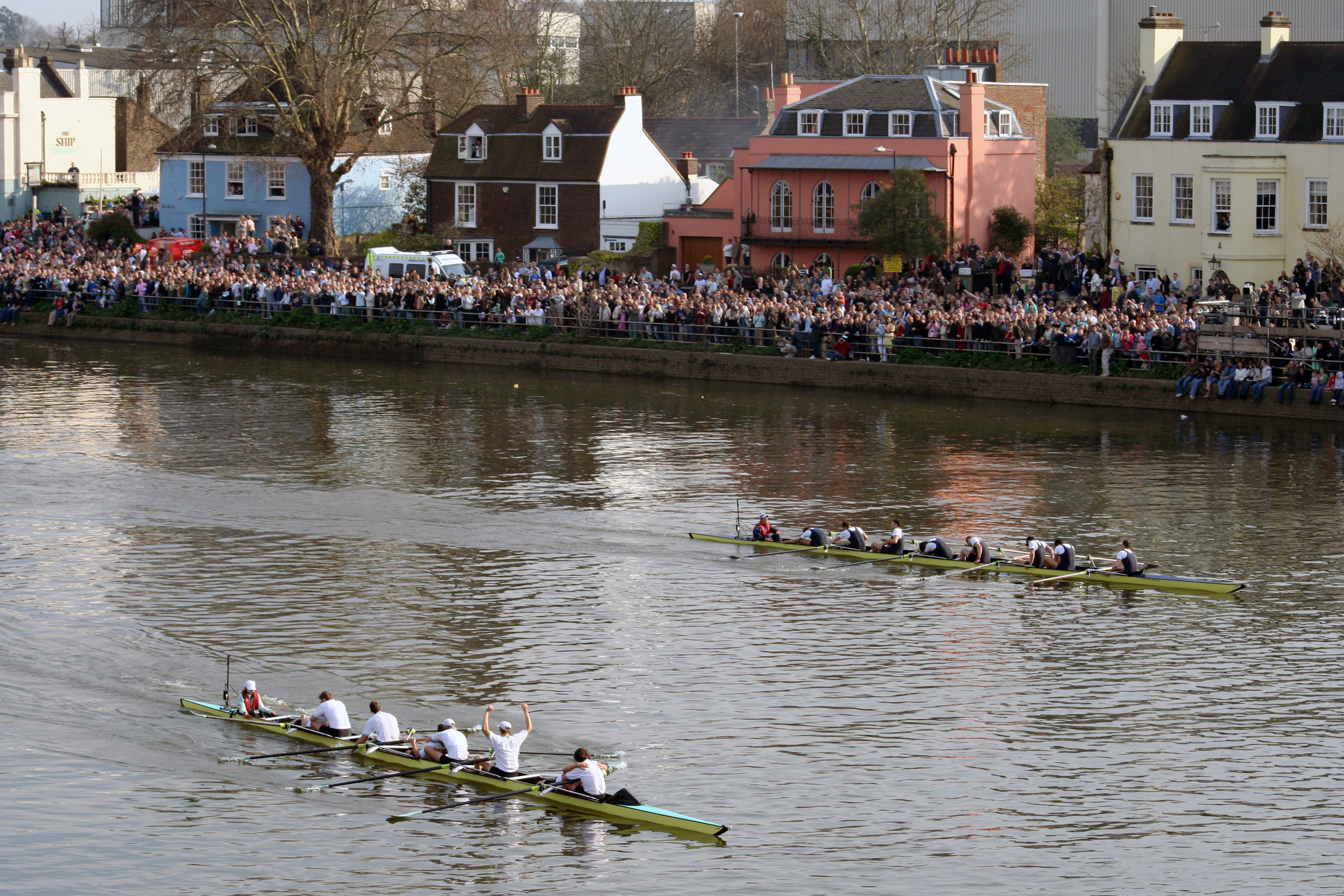
Cambridge cross the finish line ahead of Oxford in the 2007 Boat Race, viewed from Chiswick Bridge.

The Thames is the historic heartland of rowing in the United Kingdom. There are over 200 clubs on the river, and over 8,000 members of British Rowing (over 40% of its membership). Most towns and districts of any size on the river have at least one club. Internationally attended centres are Oxford, Henley-on-Thames and events and clubs on the stretch of river from Chiswick to Putney.

Two rowing events on the River Thames are traditionally part of the wider English sporting calendar:

The University Boat Race (between Oxford and Cambridge) takes place in late March or early April, on the Championship Course from Putney to Mortlake in the west of London.

Henley Royal Regatta takes place over five days at the start of July in the upstream town of Henley-on-Thames. Besides its sporting significance the regatta is an important date on the English social calendar alongside events like Royal Ascot and Wimbledon.

Other significant or historic rowing events on the Thames include:

- The Head of the River Race and Women's Eights Head of the River Race (8+) (i.e. coxed eights), Schools' Head, Veterans Head, Scullers Head, Fours Head (HOR4s), and Pairs Head (shorter) on the Championship Course
- The Wingfield Sculls on the same course: (1x) (single sculling) championship
- Doggett's Coat and Badge for apprentice watermen of London, one of the oldest sporting events in the world
- Henley Women's Regatta
- The Henley Boat Races currently for the Lightweight (men's and women's) crews of Oxford and Cambridge universities
- The Oxford University bumping races known as Eights Week and Torpids

Other regattas, head races and university bumping races are held along the Thames which are described under Rowing on the River Thames.

=== Sailing ===
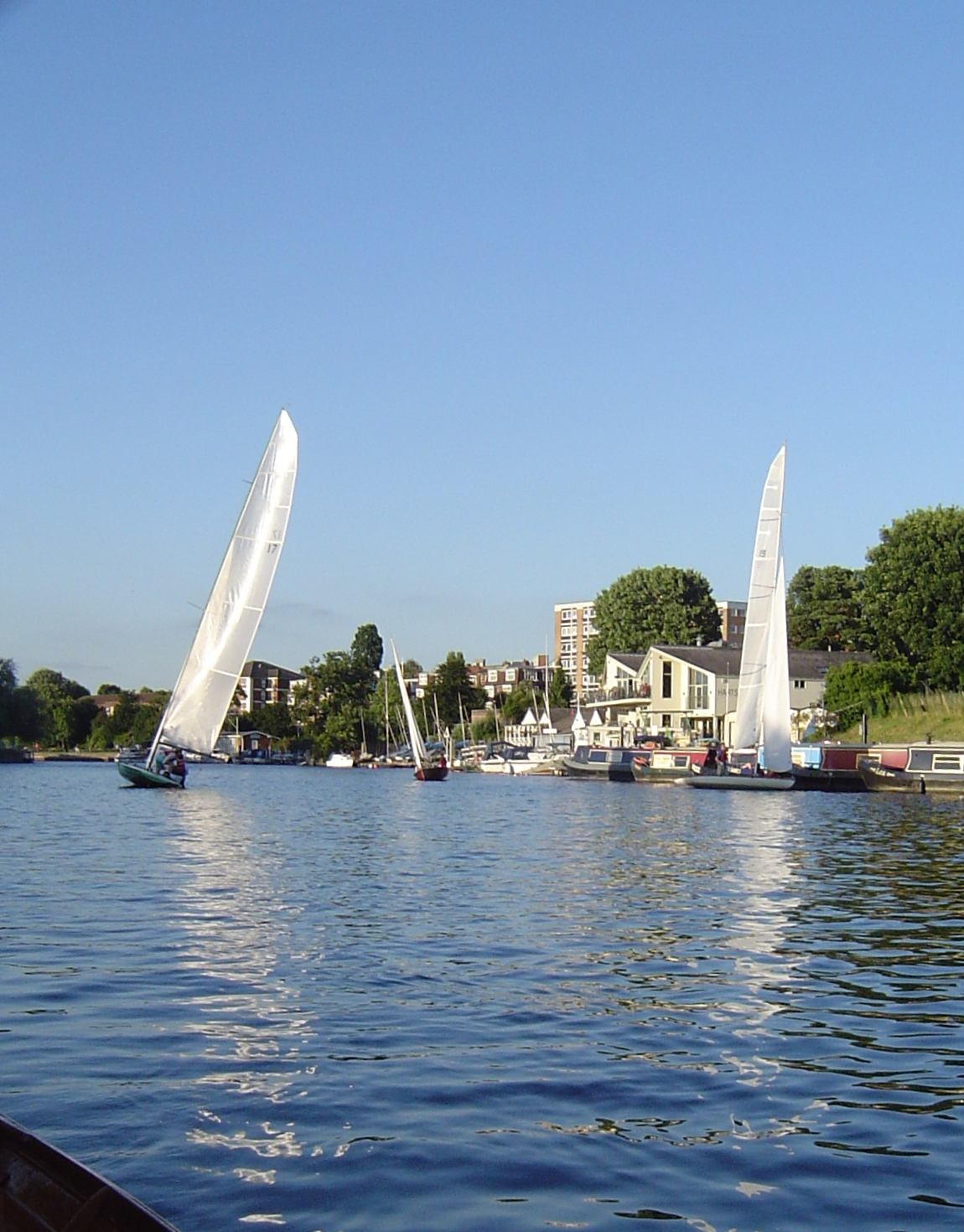
Thames Raters at Raven's Ait, Surbiton

Sailing is practised on both the tidal and non-tidal reaches of the river. The highest club upstream is at Oxford. The most popular sailing craft used on the Thames are lasers, GP14s and Wayfarers. One sailing boat unique to the Thames is the Thames Rater, which is sailed around Raven's Ait.

=== Skiffing ===
Skiffing has dwindled in favour of private motor boat ownership but is competed on the river in the summer months. Six clubs and a similar number of skiff regattas exist from the Skiff Club, Teddington upstream.

=== Punting ===
Unlike the "pleasure punting" common on the Cherwell in Oxford and the Cam in Cambridge, punting on the Thames is competitive as well as recreational and uses narrower craft, typically based at the few skiff clubs.

=== Kayaking and canoeing ===
Kayaking and canoeing are common, with sea kayakers using the tidal stretch for touring. Kayakers and canoeists use the tidal and non-tidal sections for training, racing and trips. Whitewater playboaters and slalom paddlers are catered for at weirs like those at Hurley Lock, Sunbury Lock and Boulter's Lock. At Teddington just before the tidal section of the river starts is Royal Canoe Club, said to be the oldest in the world and founded in 1866. Since 1950, almost every year at Easter, long distance canoeists have been competing in what is now known as the Devizes to Westminster International Canoe Race, which follows the course of the Kennet and Avon Canal, joins the River Thames at Reading and runs right up to a grand finish at Westminster Bridge.

=== Swimming ===
In 2006, British swimmer and environmental campaigner Lewis Pugh became the first person to swim the full length of the Thames from outside Kemble to Southend-on-Sea to draw attention to the severe drought in England which saw record temperatures indicative of a degree of global warming. The 202 mi (325 km) swim took him 21 days to complete. The official headwater of the river had stopped flowing due to the drought, forcing Pugh to run the first 26 mi (42 km).

Since June 2012, the Port of London Authority has made a by-law, which it enforces, that bans swimming between Putney Bridge and Crossness, Thamesmead (thus including all of central London), without obtaining prior permission, on the grounds that swimmers in that area of the river endanger not only themselves, due to the strong current of the river, but also other river users.

Organised swimming events take place at various points generally upstream of Hampton Court, including Windsor, Marlow and Henley. In 2011, comedian David Walliams swam the 140 mi (230 km) from Lechlade to Westminster Bridge and raised over £1 million for charity.

In non-tidal stretches swimming was, and still is, a leisure and fitness activity among experienced swimmers where safe, deeper outer channels are used in times of low stream.

=== Meanders ===
A Thames meander is a long-distance journey over all or part of the Thames by running, swimming or using any of the above means. It is often carried out as an athletic challenge in a competition or for a record attempt.

== The Thames in the arts ==
=== Visual arts ===
The River Thames has been a subject for artists, great and minor, over the centuries. Four major artists with works based on the Thames are Canaletto, J. M. W. Turner, Claude Monet and James McNeill Whistler. The 20th-century British artist Stanley Spencer produced many works at Cookham.

John Kaufman's sculpture The Diver: Regeneration is sited in the Thames near Rainham.

The river and bridges are portrayed as being destroyed – together with much of London – in the film Independence Day: Resurgence.

An aerial photography of the Thames, between Rotherhithe and Woolwich (south bank) and Shadwell and Beckton (north bank), forms the opening and closing credits of the soap opera EastEnders.

Paintings

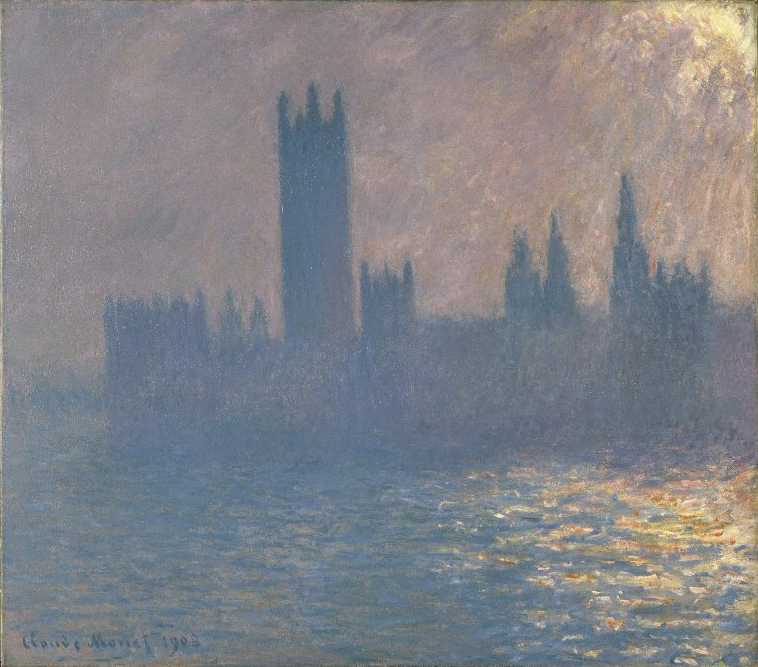
Houses of Parliament Sunlight Effect ("Le Parlement effet de soleil"), Claude Monet

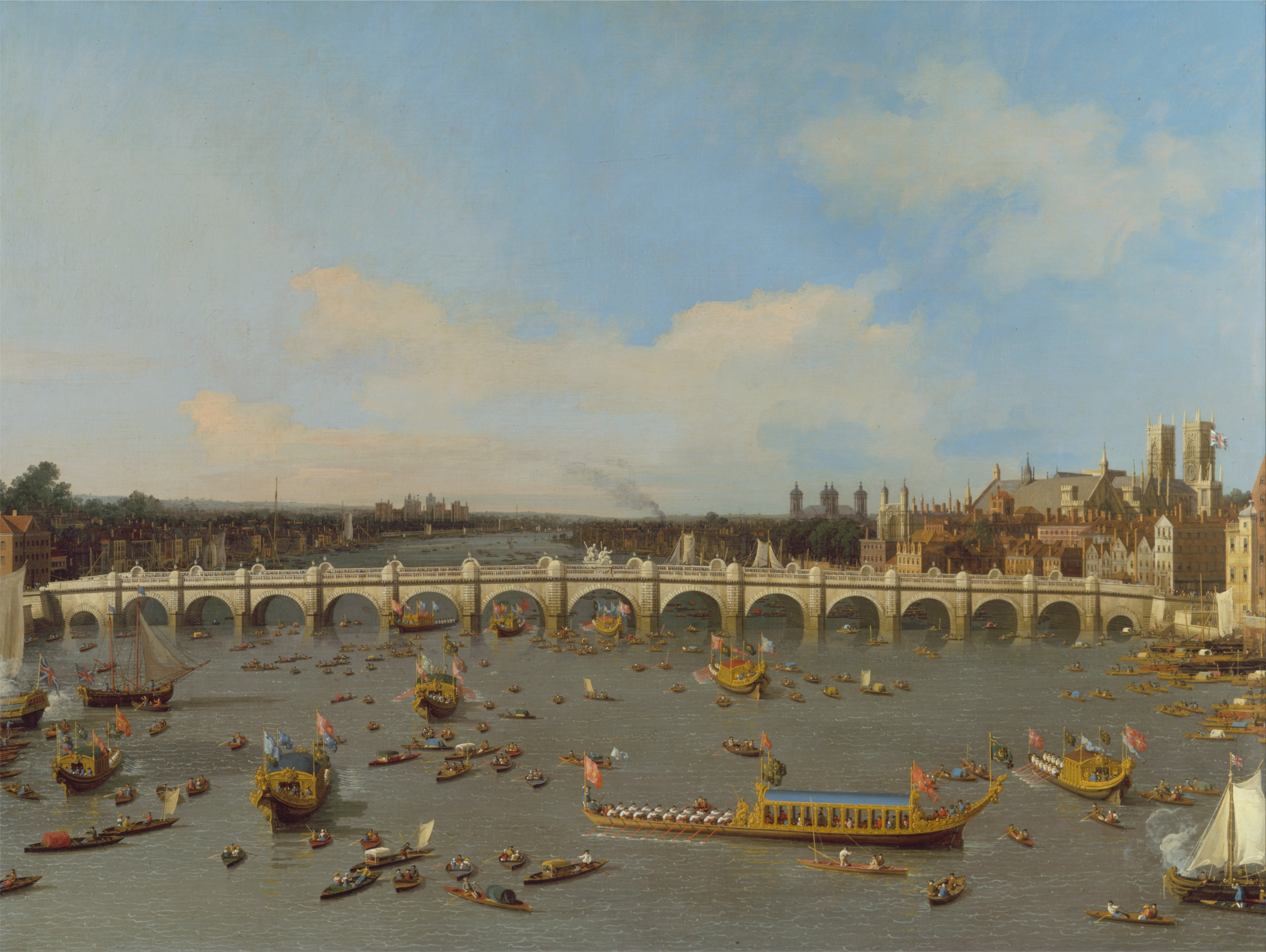
The first Westminster Bridge as painted by Canaletto in 1746

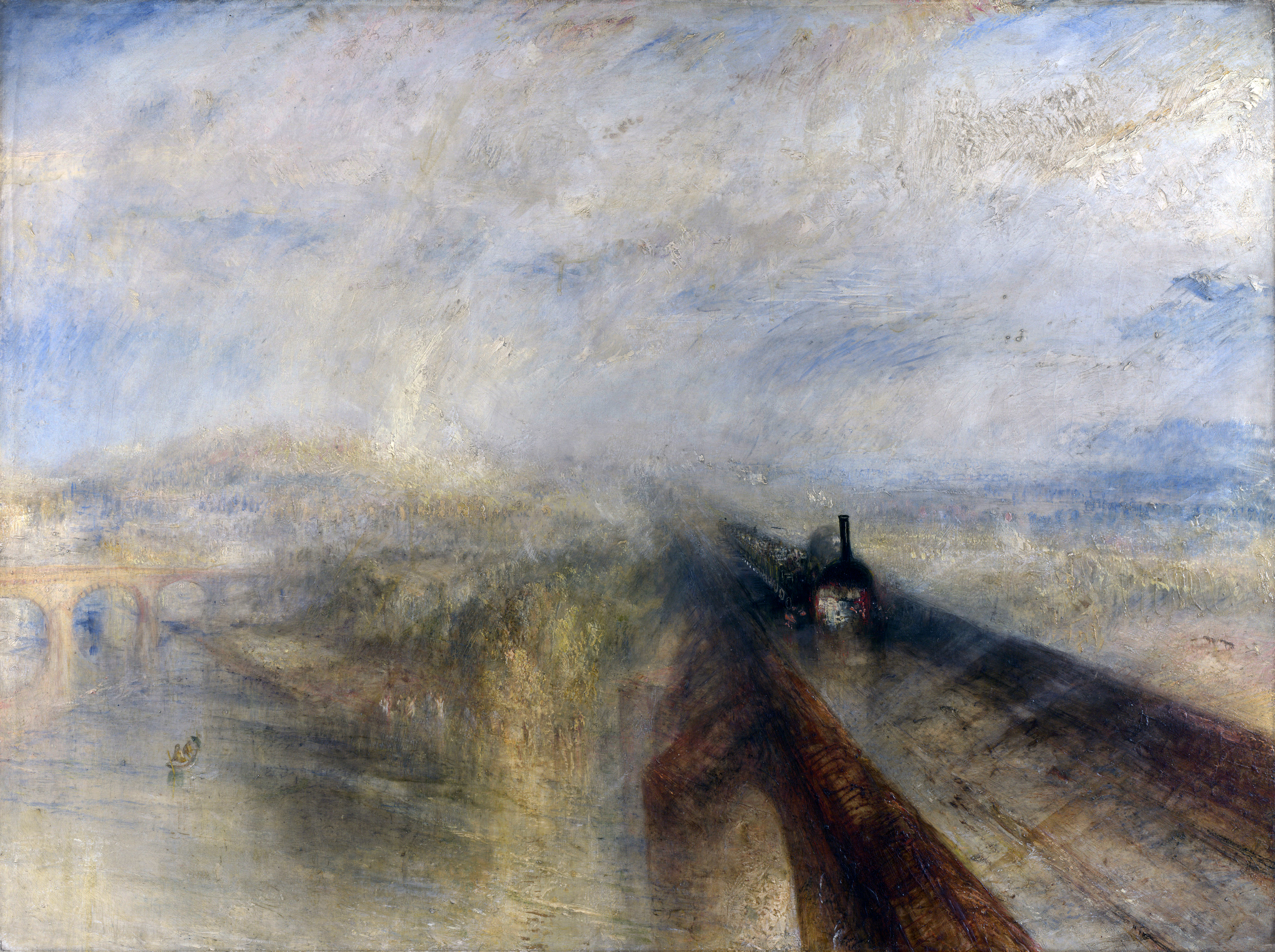
Rain, Steam and Speed – The Great Western Railway (Maidenhead Railway Bridge) as Turner saw it in 1844

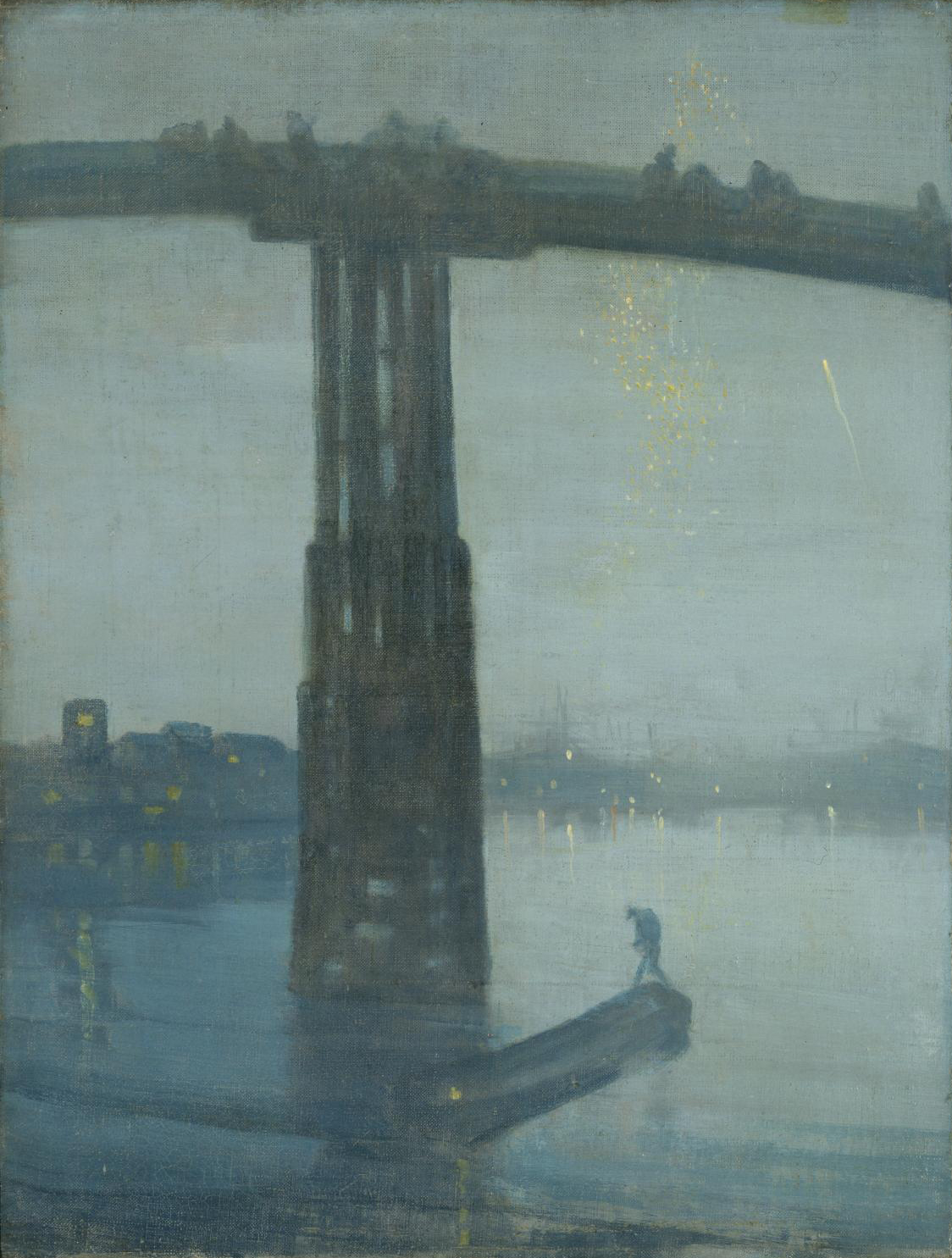
Nocturne: Blue and Gold – Old Battersea Bridge, James McNeill Whistler, (c. 1872–1875)

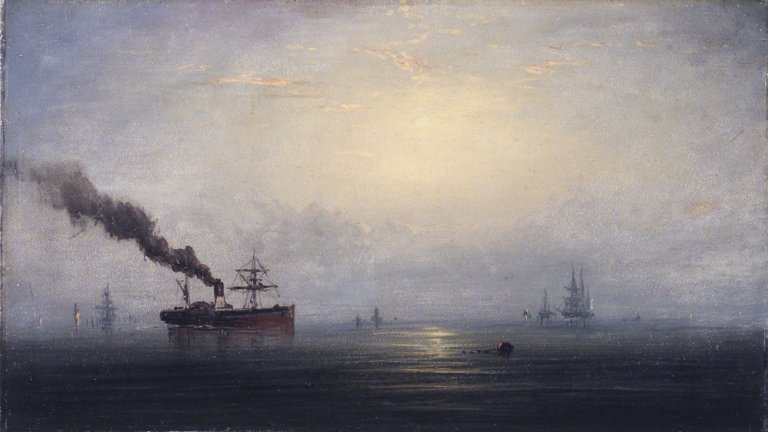
Foggy Morning on the Thames, James Hamilton (between 1872 and 1878)

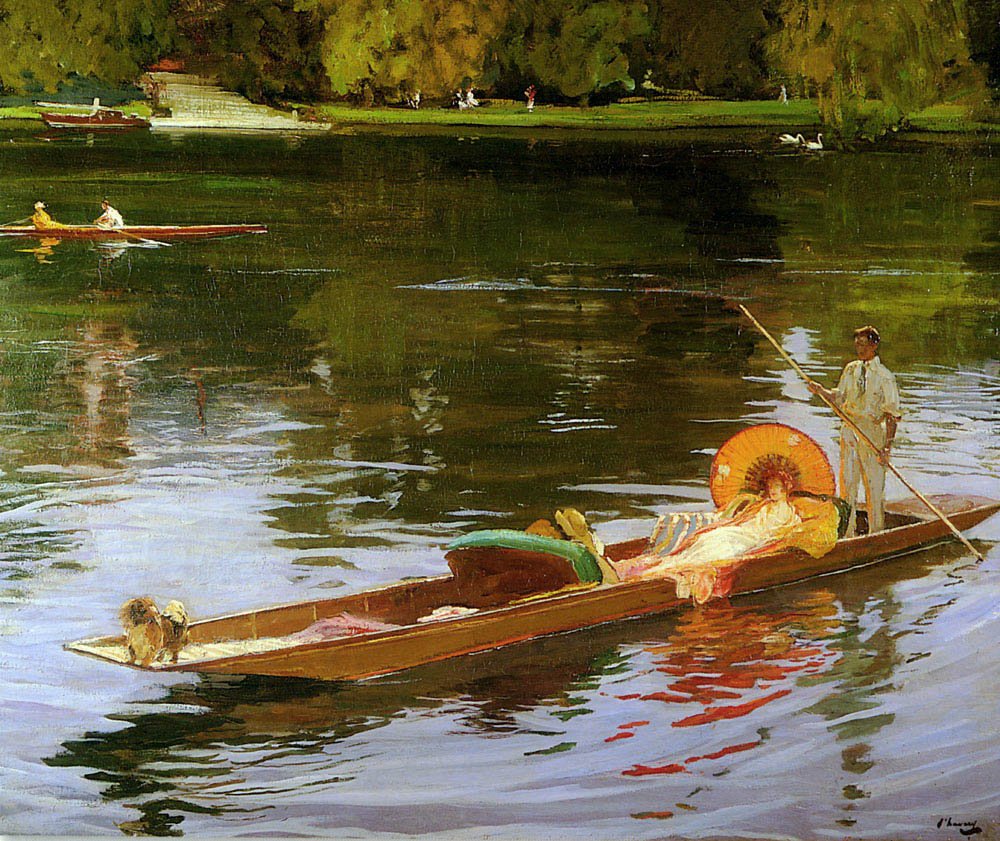
Boating on the Thames - John Lavery, c. 1890

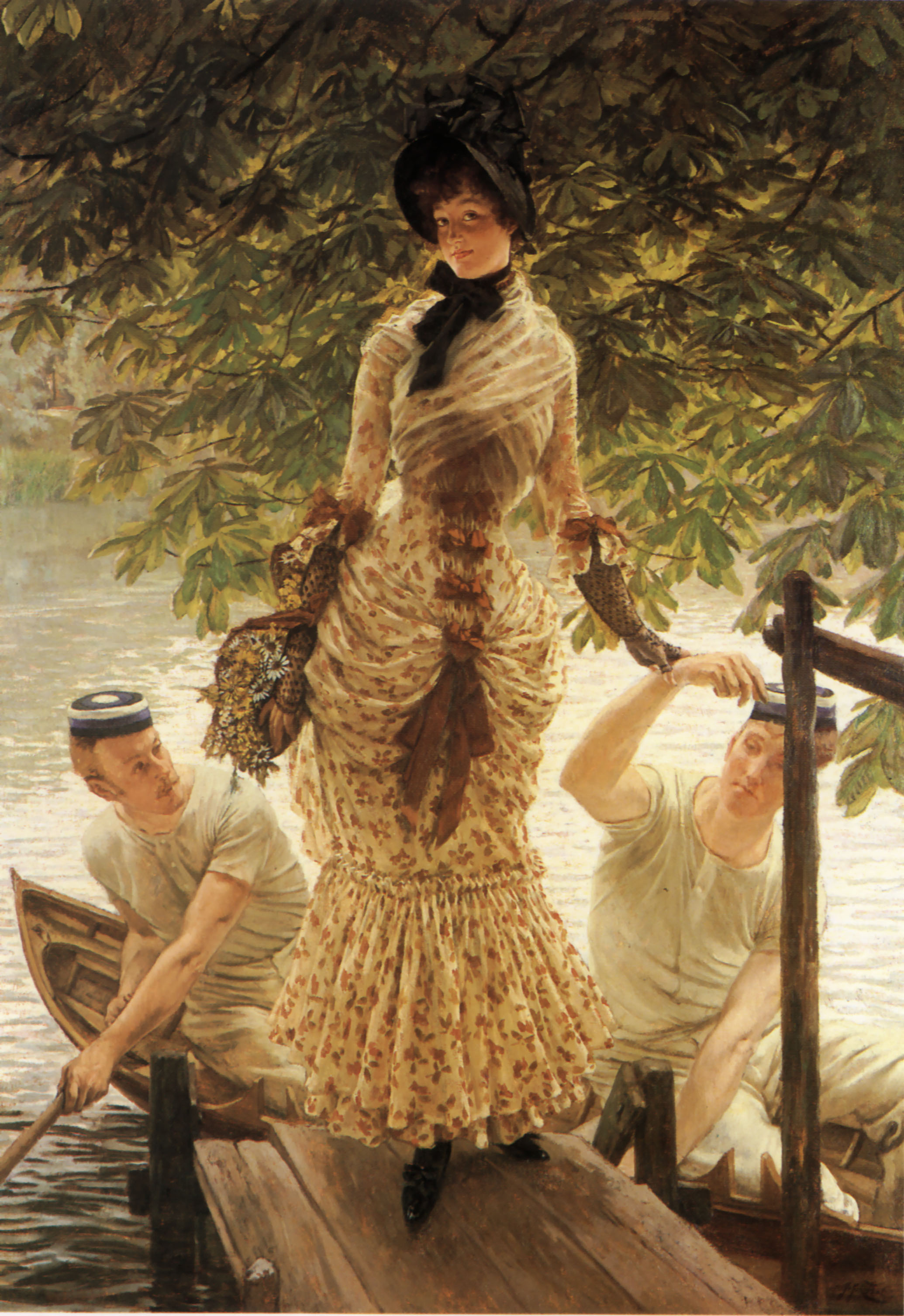
On the Thames , James Tissot, c. 1874

=== Literature ===
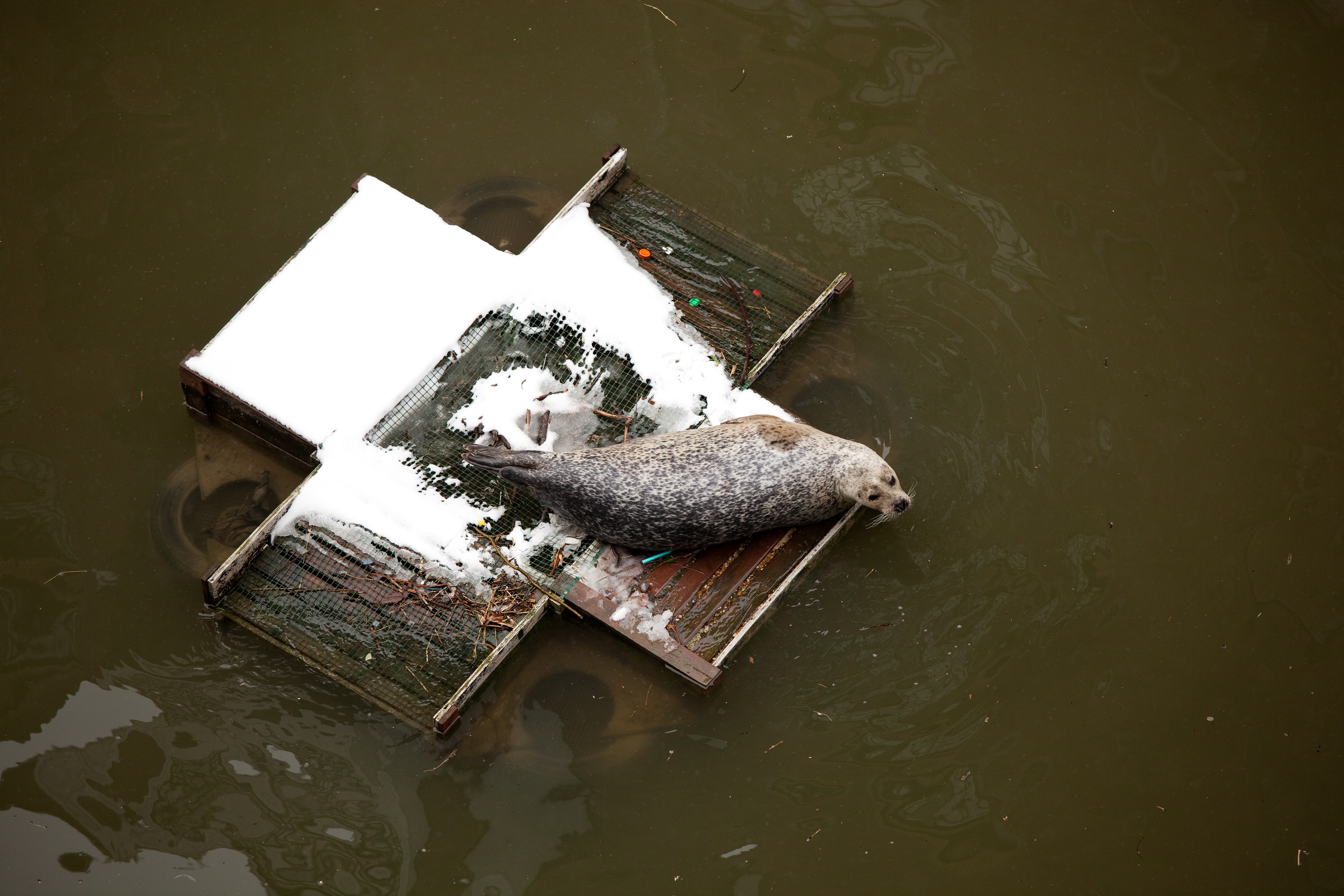
A seal in the river at St Saviour's Dock, London

The Thames is mentioned in many works of literature including novels, diaries and poetry. It is the central theme in three in particular:

Three Men in a Boat by Jerome K. Jerome, first published in 1889, is a humorous account of a boating holiday on the Thames between Kingston and Oxford. The book was intended initially to be a serious travel guide, with accounts of local history of places along the route, but the humorous elements eventually took over. The landscape and features of the Thames as described by Jerome are virtually unchanged, and the book's enduring popularity has meant that it has never been out of print since it was first published.

Charles Dickens' Our Mutual Friend (written in the years 1864–65) describes the river in a grimmer light. It begins with a scavenger and his daughter pulling a dead man from the river near London Bridge, to salvage what the body might have in its pockets, and leads to its conclusion with the deaths of the villains drowned in Plashwater Lock upstream. The workings of the river and the influence of the tides are described with great accuracy. Dickens opens the novel with this sketch of the river, and the people who work on it:

In these times of ours, though concerning the exact year there is no need to be precise, a boat of dirty and disreputable appearance, with two figures in it, floated on the Thames, between Southwark Bridge which is of iron, and London Bridge which is of stone, as an autumn evening was closing in. The figures in this boat were those of a strong man with ragged grizzled hair and a sun-browned face, and a girl of nineteen or twenty. The girl rowed, pulling a pair of sculls very easily; the man with the rudder-lines slack in his hands, and his hands loose in his waisteband, kept an eager look-out.

Kenneth Grahame's The Wind in the Willows, written in 1908, is set in the middle to upper reaches of the river. It starts as a tale of anthropomorphic characters "simply messing about in boats" but develops into a more complex story combining elements of mysticism with adventure and reflection on Edwardian society. It is generally considered one of the most beloved works of children's literature and the illustrations by E.H.Shepard and Arthur Rackham feature the Thames and its surroundings.

The river almost inevitably features in many books set in London. Most of Dickens' other novels include some aspect of the Thames. Oliver Twist finishes in the slums and rookeries along its south bank. The Sherlock Holmes stories by Arthur Conan Doyle often visit riverside parts as in The Sign of Four. In Heart of Darkness by Joseph Conrad, the serenity of the contemporary Thames is contrasted with the savagery of the Congo River, and with the wilderness of the Thames as it would have appeared to a Roman soldier posted to Britannia two thousand years before. Conrad also gives a description of the approach to London from the Thames Estuary in his essays The Mirror of the Sea (1906). Upriver, Henry James' Portrait of a Lady uses a large riverside mansion on the Thames as one of its key settings.

Literary non-fiction works include Samuel Pepys' diary, in which he recorded many events relating to the Thames including the Fire of London. He was disturbed while writing it in June 1667 by the sound of gunfire as Dutch warships broke through the Royal Navy on the Thames.

In poetry, William Wordsworth's sonnet On Westminster Bridge closes with the lines:

Ne'er saw I, never felt, a calm so deep!
The river glideth at his own sweet will:
Dear God! the very houses seem asleep;
And all that mighty heart is lying still!

T. S. Eliot makes several references to the Thames in The Fire Sermon, Section III of The Waste Land.

The Sweet Thames line is taken from Edmund Spenser's Prothalamion which presents a more idyllic image:

Along the shoare of silver streaming Themmes;
Whose rutty banke, the which his river hemmes,
Was paynted all with variable flowers.
And all the meads adorn'd with daintie gemmes
Fit to deck maydens bowres

Also writing of the upper reaches is Matthew Arnold in The Scholar Gypsy:

Crossing the stripling Thames at Bab-lock-hythe
Trailing in the cool stream thy fingers wet
As the slow punt swings round

Oh born in days when wits were fresh and clear
And life ran gaily as the sparkling Thames;
Before this strange disease of modern life.

Wendy Cope's poem 'After the Lunch' is set on Waterloo Bridge, beginning:

On Waterloo Bridge, where we said our goodbyes,
The weather conditions bring tears to my eyes.
I wipe them away with a black woolly glove,
And try not to notice I've fallen in love.

Dylan Thomas mentions the Thames in his poem "A Refusal to Mourn the Death, by Fire, of a Child in London". "London's Daughter", the subject of the poem, lays "Deep with the first dead...secret by the unmourning water of the riding Thames".

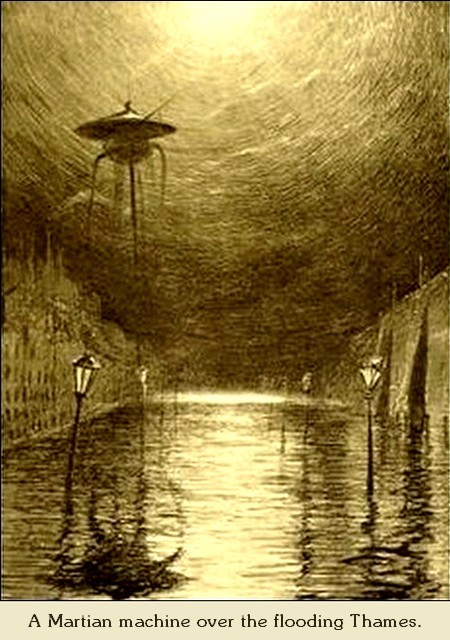
Martian machine over the flooded Thames. Illustration from H. G. Wells' The War of the Worlds (1898)

Science-fiction novels make liberal use of a futuristic Thames. The utopian News from Nowhere by William Morris is mainly the account of a journey through the Thames valley in a socialist future. The Thames features in H. G. Wells' The War of the Worlds. The Thames also features prominently in Philip Pullman's His Dark Materials trilogy, as a communications artery for the waterborne Gyptian people of Oxford and the Fens, and as a prominent setting for his novel La Belle Sauvage.

In The Deptford Mice trilogy by Robin Jarvis, the Thames appears several times. In one book, rat characters swim through it to Deptford. Winner of the Nestlé Children's Book Prize Gold Award I, Coriander, by Sally Gardner is a fantasy novel in which the heroine lives on the banks of the Thames. Mark Wallington describes a journey up the Thames in a camping skiff, in his 1989 book Boogie up the River.

Many of the principal characters of the Rivers of London urban fantasy series by Ben Aaronovitch are genii locorum (local gods) associated with River Thames and its tributaries. This includes Father Thames, the original god of the Thames but now (in the books) confined to non-tidal reaches above Teddington Lock and Mama Thames the goddess of the tidal Thames below Teddington.

=== Music ===
The Water Music composed by George Frideric Handel premiered on 17 July 1717, when King George I requested a concert on the River Thames. The concert was performed for King George I on his barge and he is said to have enjoyed it so much that he ordered the 50 exhausted musicians to play the suites three times on the trip.

The song 'Old Father Thames' was recorded by Peter Dawson at Abbey Road Studios in 1933 and by Gracie Fields five years later. Jessie Matthews sings "My river" in the 1938 film Sailing Along, and the tune is the centrepiece of a major dance number near the end of the film.

The Sex Pistols played a concert on the Queen Elizabeth Riverboat on 7 June 1977, Queen Elizabeth II's Silver Jubilee year, while sailing down the river.

The choral line "(I) (liaised) live by the river" in the song "London Calling" by the Clash refers to the River Thames.

Two songs by the Kinks feature the Thames as the setting of the first song's title and, for the second song, arguably in its mention of 'the river': "Waterloo Sunset" is about a couple's meetings on Waterloo Bridge, London and starts: "Dirty old river, must you keep rolling, flowing into the night?" and continues "Terry meets Julie, Waterloo station" and "...but Terry and Julie cross over the river where they feel safe and sound...". "See My Friends" continually refers to the singer's friends "playing 'cross the river" instead of the girl who "just left". Furthermore, Ray Davies as a solo artist refers to the River Thames in his "London Song".

Ewan MacColl's "Sweet Thames, Flow Softly", written in the early 1960s, is a tragic love ballad set on trip up the river (see Edmund Spenser's love poem's refrain above). Culture Club are travelling the River Thames in a riverboat in the video for "Karma Chameleon". English musician Imogen Heap wrote a song from the point of view of the River Thames entitled "You Know Where To Find Me". The song was released in 2012 on 18 October as the sixth single from her fourth album Sparks.

== Major flood and drought events ==
=== London flood of 1928 ===
The 1928 Thames flood was a disastrous flood of the River Thames that affected much of riverside London on 7 January 1928, as well as places further downriver. Fourteen people were drowned in London and thousands were made homeless when flood waters poured over the top of the Thames Embankment and part of the Chelsea Embankment collapsed. It was the last major flood to affect central London, and, particularly following the disastrous North Sea flood of 1953, helped lead to the implementation of new flood-control measures that culminated in the construction of the Thames Barrier in the 1970s.

=== Thames Valley flood of 1947 ===
The 1947 Thames flood was overall the worst 20th-century flood of the River Thames, affecting much of the Thames Valley as well as elsewhere in England during the middle of March 1947 after a very severe winter.

The floods were caused by 4.6 in (120 mm) of rainfall (including snow); the peak flow was 61.7×10^{9} L (13.6×10^{9} imp gal) of water per day and the damage cost a total of £12 million to repair. War damage to some of the locks made matters worse.

Other significant Thames floods since 1947 have occurred in 1968, 1993, 1998, 2000, 2003, 2006 and 2014.

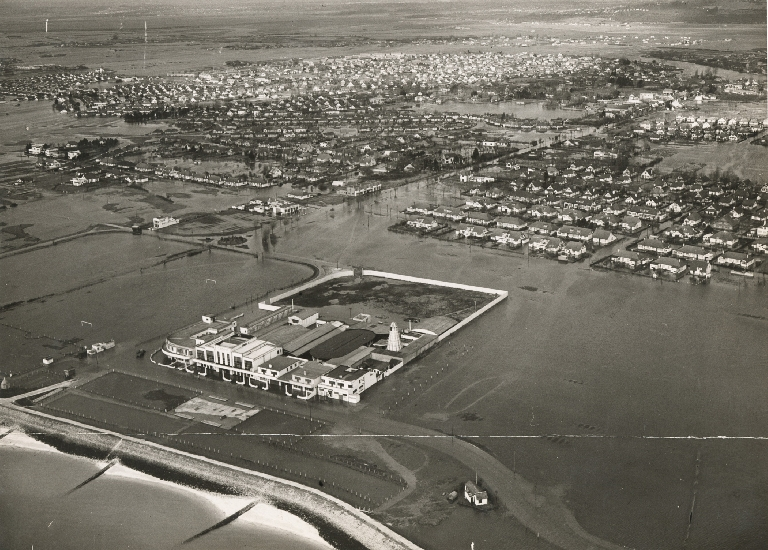
The flooded Canvey Island sea front, amusements and residential areas in 1953

=== Canvey Island flood of 1953 ===
On the night of 31 January, the North Sea flood of 1953 devastated the island, taking the lives of 58 islanders and forcing the temporary evacuation of the 13,000 residents. Canvey is consequently protected by modern sea defences comprising 15 mi (24 km) of concrete seawall. Many of the victims were in the holiday bungalows of the eastern Newlands estate and perished as the water reached ceiling level. The small village area of the island is approximately two foot (0.6 m) above sea level and consequently escaped the effects of the flood.

=== 2026 drought ===
On 29 July 2026, after a extended period of dry and hot weather, much of the south of England was declared officially in drought, with the Environment Agency introducing navigation restrictions from St John's Lock in Gloucestershire to Osney Lock in Oxford. In August 2026 it was reported that "significant rainfall" was needed within weeks to avoid a "dire situation" for boat owners. The Environment Agency advised those travelling on the river to avoid making unnecessary journeys and to share locks. Users were also told not to wash boats at drinking water points.

== See also ==
- Dartford Cable Tunnel
- Foreshore of the River Thames
- List of locations in the Port of London
- List of rivers of the United Kingdom
- Subterranean rivers of London
- Thames Discovery Programme
- Thames sailing barge
- Thames steamers
- River Tyburn
