= Buscot Lock =

Lock on the River Thames in Oxfordshire, England

Coordinates: 51°40′52″N 1°40′07″W

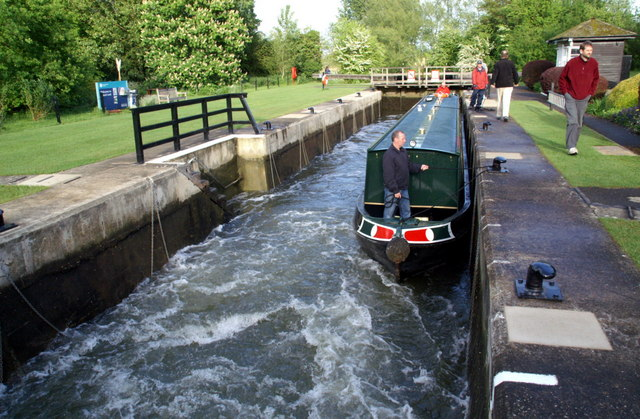
- Buscot Lock, filling.
- Interactive map of Buscot Lock
- Waterway: River Thames
- County: Oxfordshire
- Maintained by: Environment Agency
- Operation: Manual
- First built: 1790
- Length: 33.47 m (109 ft 10 in)
- Width: 4.47 m (14 ft 8 in)
- Fall: 1.69 m (5 ft 7 in)
- Above sea level: 230'
- Distance to Teddington Lock: 122 miles

Buscot Lock is a lock on the River Thames in England, near the village of Buscot, Oxfordshire.

The lock was built of stone by the Thames Navigation Commission in 1790 and is the smallest on the River Thames. Like most of the Upper Thames Locks, it is a beam lock, which is operated manually through pushing the beams to open and close the gates.

The new weir was created in 1979 when a cut was made through fields on the southern side of the lock. Of an unusual cresting design, it is now a National Trust picnic area. The weir was previously on the northern side of the lock. The area is rich in flora and fauna, and a frequent haunt for otters, kites and kingfishers.

== History ==
Before the construction of the lock, a flash lock was in place at Buscot weir to help navigation. When the lock was built the weir was owned by Edward Loveden Loveden of Buscot Park, who was a very strong champion of Thames navigation. The pound lock was built by J. Nock who also built St John's Lock at the same time after the opening of the Thames and Severn Canal. At first it was often alluded to as the "New Lock". The lock keeper's cottage was built in 1791, when Robert Gearing became the first lock keeper, and features a fish house.

When the Thames and Severn Canal was nearing completion, the engineer Robert Whitworth proposed making a new cut from near Inglesham to join the Thames below Buscot lock, because of the poor state of the upper river. However, the construction of locks at St John's and Buscot resulted in him using the natural course of the river rather than a new cut. The junction between the canal and river opened on 14 November 1789, but it was late 1790 before the two new locks were completed.

Buscot lock was particularly troublesome for the Thames and Severn Canal, because Lovenden charged a toll of one shilling for every five tons of cargo, which was the highest rate on the Thames, and whereas most locks only charged a toll for boats passing in one direction, Lovenden charged for boats moving both up and down the river, effectively doubling the charge. Such tolls increased the cost of products moving along the Thames from the canal, and restricted the volume of cargo which used the river. Lovenden refused to make any changes to his policy, even when the canal was struggling with profitability. The high costs of using Buscot lock, and the general poor state of the river above Abingdon were one of the main driving forces for a connection between the Thames and Severn Canal and the Wilts & Berks Canal, which would enable boats from the Thames and Severn to reach Abingdon without having to use Buscot Lock. Lovenden opposed the plans by every means he could, to protect his income.

The Wilts & Berks Canal had grand plans for extensions at the time, including a Severn Junction link to Cirencester, part of which became the North Wilts Canal, which ran from Swindon to Latton on the Thames and Severn. Lovenden wrote a report, opposing the canal project and commenting on "the present sufficient and still improving state" of the upper Thames. He alleged that the Wilts & Berks intended to obtain extra water supplies from the Thames, and ended with a plea to oppose "the conspiracy against old Father Thames". It had its desired effect, with the bill for Severn Junction Canal being withdrawn from the 1811 session of Parliament. He continued his campaign, buying up shares in the proposed canal, and in January 1812 packed the proprietors meeting with his associates where he alleged that the Thames Commissioners were about to improve the river above Abingdon, and succeeded in passing a resolution to oppose the junction with the Thames and Severn at Latton.

The committee for the Severn Junction Canal soon became aware that there were no such plans to improve the river, and a meeting was held shortly afterwards to reverse the previous decision. Lovenden had one last attempt to discredit the canal scheme, by alleging that the Wilts & Berks had acted in bad faith, and that the chairman of the company had taken a retainer from the Wilts & Berks. Finally recognising defeat, Lovenden grabbed the minute book and defaced it to remove his name from the records. The Severn Junction Canal became the North Wilts Canal, linking Latton to Swindon, and its authorising bill received royal assent on 2 July 1813, when the North Wilts Canal Act 1813 (53 Geo. 3. c. clxxxii) was passed. The canal opened on 2 April 1819, ending Buscot lock's stranglehold on trade between the Thames and Severn Canal and the River Thames.

When the Thames Conservancy took over management of the river in 1866, ownership of the weir remained with Mr Campbell of Buscot Park. Section 231 of the Thames Conservancy Act 1894 (57 & 58 Vict. c. clxxxvii) confirmed the private ownership of Buscot weir and lock, and Thacker noted that it was still owned by the Buscot estate in 1920. The old weir was renewed by Lord Faringdon of Buscot Park in 1909, The original structures were replaced by a new cut and weir in 1979.

== Reach above the lock ==
The river winds and doubles back on itself sharply on the short stretch upstream.

Buscot Park is above the lock. Robert Tertius Campbell who bought it in 1859 built a factory to distill alcohol from sugar beet. He supplied water to his estate from the river via a set of water wheels, but closed the undertaking in 1879. The property is now owned by the National Trust. Upstream, Bloomers Hole Footbridge crosses the river, then the River Cole enters from the southern bank, the River Leach enters from the northern bank, and finally St John's Bridge marks the beginning of St John's Lock.

The Thames Path follows the northern bank from Buscot Lock to Bloomers Hole Footbridge, where it crosses the river.

== See also ==
- Lechlade-on-Thames
- Locks on the River Thames
- Crossings of the River Thames

Next crossing upstream	River Thames	Next crossing downstream
Bloomers Hole Footbridge	Buscot Lock	Eaton Footbridge
Next lock upstream	River Thames	Next lock downstream
St John's Lock; 1.85 km (1.15 mi)	Buscot Lock; Grid reference: SU230980	Grafton Lock; 5.37 km (3.34 mi)

== Bibliography ==
- Household, Humphrey (2009). The Thames and Severn Canal. Amberley Publishing. ISBN 978-1-84868-035-7.
- Thacker, Fred. S. (1968) [1920]. The Thames Highway: Volume II Locks and Weirs. David & Charles. ISBN 0-7153-4233-9.
