= Southrop =

Village in Gloucestershire, England

Coordinates: 51.699999°N 1.6916°W

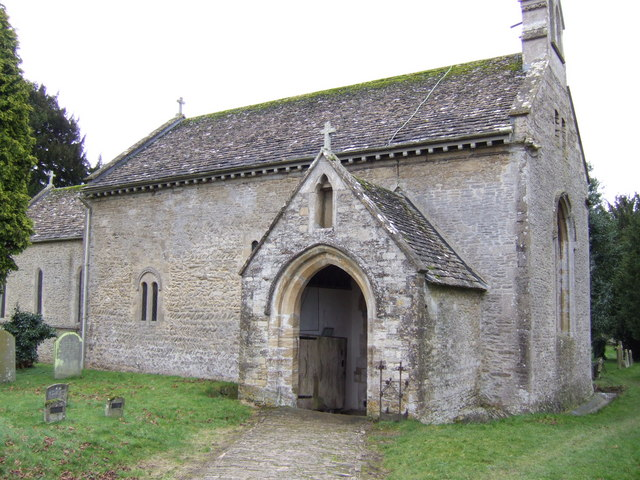
- St. Peter's, Southrop

- Location within Gloucestershire
- Population: 245 (2011)
- OS grid reference: SP205035
- Civil parish: Southrop
- District: Cotswold
- Shire county: Gloucestershire
- Region: South West
- Country: England
- Sovereign state: United Kingdom
- Post town: Lechlade
- Postcode district: GL7
- Police: Gloucestershire
- Fire: Gloucestershire
- Ambulance: South Western
- UK Parliament: North Cotswolds

Southrop is a village and civil parish in Gloucestershire, England. It is situated on the River Leach. The Grade I listed St Peter's Church dates from the 12th century. Nearby villages include Eastleach Turville, Eastleach Martin, Little Faringdon, Fairford, Lechlade, Filkins and Hatherop.

== Name and etymology ==
The name Southrop comes from sūð + þrop meaning "southern farmstead", the other þrop nearby being Hatherop. It has been attested as Suthþrop in the 1200s and Sowthethrop by the 1500s.

== History ==
A riot occurred in Southrop on 29 November 1830 as part of the Swing Riots of 1830 across the country. A farmer describes seeing "a great mob, who were many of them armed with hammers, axes and bludgeons".

Southrop Manor belonged to Wadham College, Oxford for three centuries, until 1926.

== Buildings ==
There exist many buildings in Southrop. There are:

The pub: There is a pub, The Swan, owned by Thyme.

Church: A church, St Peter's Church, regularly hosts events and services for the villagers.

Village Hall: The village hall has its popularity in the village. It often hosts events, in the bar inside, games nights, and the infamous Southrop Supper, where adults and children alike share a big dinner together with friends.

== Tourism ==
Southrop was rated as among the "20 most beautiful villages in the UK and Ireland" according to Condé Nast Traveler and is visited by many tourists each year.

The local pub is "The Swan".
