= Head of navigation =

Furthest navigable point up a waterway

The head of navigation is the furthest point above the mouth of a river that can be navigated by ships. Determining the head of navigation can be subjective on many streams, as the point may vary greatly with the size or the draft of the ship being contemplated for navigation and the seasonal water level. On others, it is quite objective, being caused by a waterfall, a low bridge that is not a drawbridge, or a dam without navigation locks. Several rivers in a region may have their heads of navigation along a line called the fall line.

Longer rivers such as the River Thames might have numerous heads of navigation depending on the size of the vessel. In the case of the Thames, that includes London Bridge, which historically served as the head of navigation for tall ships; Osney Bridge in Oxford, which has the lowest headroom of any bridge on the Thames that generally restricts navigation to smaller vessels such as narrowboats and cabin cruisers, and the long reach above St John's Lock, the first lock downstream of the river’s source, on the outskirts of Lechlade, where the river can become extremely narrow and shallow for anything besides small motorboats and human-powered vessels.

In the United States, the entirety of a navigable waterway up to the head of navigation is subject to federal jurisdiction. The government recognizes that the "upper limit" of navigability will "often be the same point traditionally recognized as the head of navigation", but may under some circumstances lie "yet farther upstream".
