= Grafton Lock =

Lock on the River Thames in Oxfordshire, England

Coordinates: 51.69090°N 1.60935°W

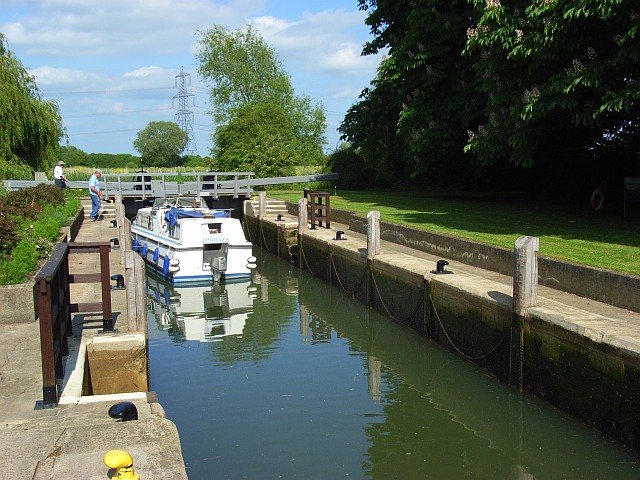
- Grafton Lock
- Waterway: River Thames
- County: Oxfordshire
- Maintained by: Environment Agency
- Operation: Manual
- First built: 1896
- Length: 34.59 m (113 ft 6 in)
- Width: 4.59 m (15 ft 1 in)
- Fall: 1.11 m (3 ft 8 in)
- Above sea level: 223'
- Distance to Teddington Lock: 118 miles

Grafton Lock is a lock on the River Thames in Oxfordshire, England. It is on the northern bank between Kelmscott and Radcot, about 1 mile (1.6 km) south of the hamlet of Grafton. The lock was built by the Thames Conservancy in 1896.

The weir is on the other side of the lock island at the upstream end.

Grafton Lock Meadow at the lock is a Site of Special Scientific Interest.

== History ==
There was previously a weir with a flash lock on the site known variously as Day's, East, New Lock or Lower Hart's. The name Lower Hart's was to avoid confusion with another Hart's Weir upstream which was eventually replaced by Eaton Footbridge in 1936.

The Thames Conservancy removed the weir in 1869. The first suggestion for a permanent pound lock was made in 1892, four years before it opened.

== Access to the lock ==
The lock can be reached on foot along the river or by road on a turning off Langley Lane which connects to the A4095.

== Reach above the lock ==
On the southern bank the river passes Eaton Hastings. On the north bank is Kelmscott and Kelmscott Manor, the country retreat of William Morris.

Further upstream the river is crossed by Eaton Footbridge There are moorings at this point reflecting the history of the site which had a weir and flash lock until 1936.

The Thames Path follows the northern bank to Buscot Lock.

== See also ==
- Locks on the River Thames

Next lock upstream	River Thames	Next lock downstream
Buscot Lock; 5.37 km (3.34 mi)	Grafton Lock; Grid reference: SU271992	Radcot Lock; 2.98 km (1.85 mi)

== Sources ==
- Thacker, Fred. S. (1968) [1920]. The Thames Highway. Vol. II: Locks and Weirs. Newton Abbott: David & Charles. pp. 13, 45, 49–52, 84. SBN 7153-4233-9.
