= The Trout Inn, Lechlade =

Grade II listed building in England

Trout Inn
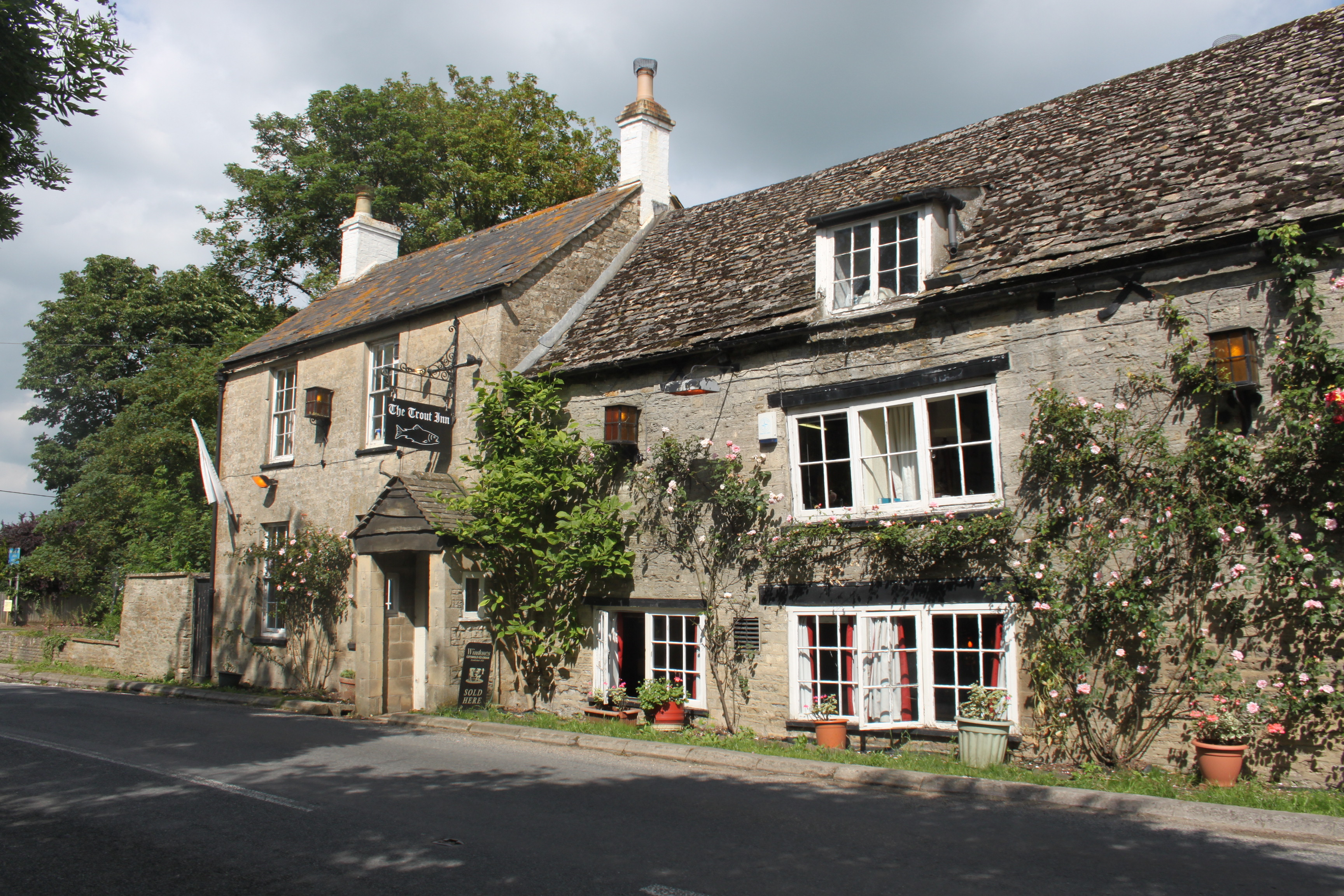

- Location within Gloucestershire
- 51°41′25″N 1°40′42″W
- Location: St. John's Bridge, Lechlade

History
- Built: 1220

Site notes
- Area: Gloucestershire

Listed Building – Grade II
- Designated: 4 July 1985
- Reference no.: 1155618

The Trout Inn is a pub next to the River Thames at Lechlade, Gloucestershire, England. The Grade II listed stone building consists of two two-storey structures, one late medieval and the other added in the 18th century. The building began as an almshouse for workers on the adjoining St John's Bridge in the 1220s, before becoming part of a priory and then an inn.

== Location ==
The pub is located on the Thames Path close to St John's Lock and St John's Bridge, where the River Cole and the River Leach join the Thames on opposite banks. Mooring for boats is available and small boats can be hired from the pub garden.

The pub is on the A417 on the outskirts of Lechlade. There is a camp site next to the pub. The pub owns 2 miles (3.2 km) of fishing rights.

== History ==
The building was started in the 1220s by Peter Fitzherbert as a hospital or almshouse, dedicated to St. John the Baptist, which had the mandate of caring for workmen on the bridge. The building was part of the Augustinian Lechlade Priory founded in the 13th century by Isabella de Mortimer; in 1252 Richard, 1st Earl of Cornwall became its patron. The priory survived until its dissolution in 1472. At that time, the building became known as an inn called Ye Sygne of St John Baptist Head. The name was changed to The Trout Inn in 1704.

In the 18th and early 19th centuries, The Trout provided the residence for the lock keeper of St John's Lock; this function was discontinued in 1830 when a lock house was built.

The pub is a venue for regular music events, particularly jazz, though one event in January 2014 had to be cancelled because of flooding. The pub serves draught beer and is Cask Marque accredited.

== Architecture ==
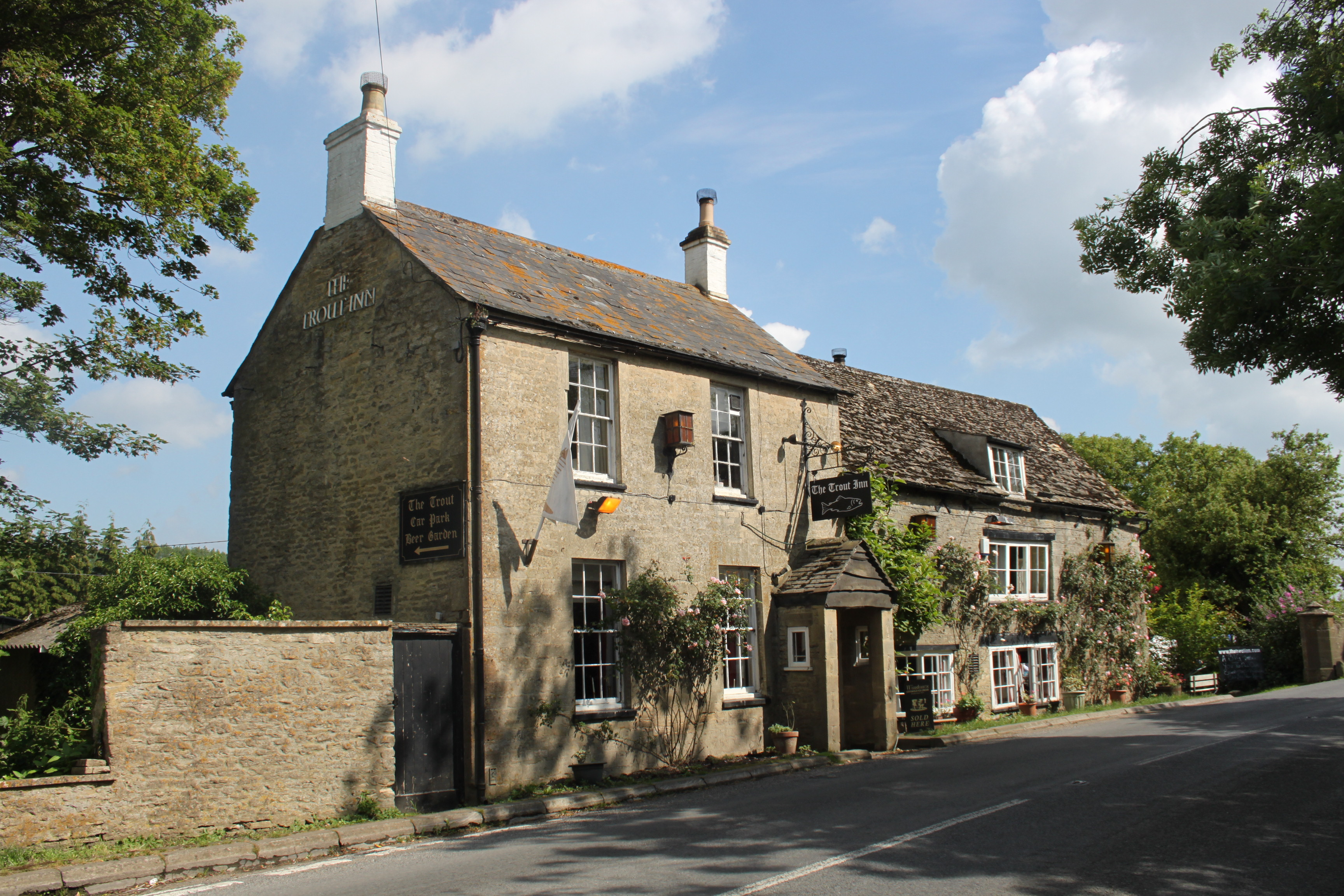
The Trout Inn from the A417

The original, two-storey structure is late medieval. Its interior incorporates timber-beamed ceilings. Near the end of the 18th century, a two-storey addition was made on the northern side; this building features stone construction and a slate roof. The newer structure features a pair of 12-pane sash windows on each floor, a half-glazed door, and a gabled entryway. To the rear of the buildings lie an old-fashioned garden, an orchard, and a pool.
