= Bloomers Hole Footbridge =

Footbridge across the River Thames in Oxfordshire, England

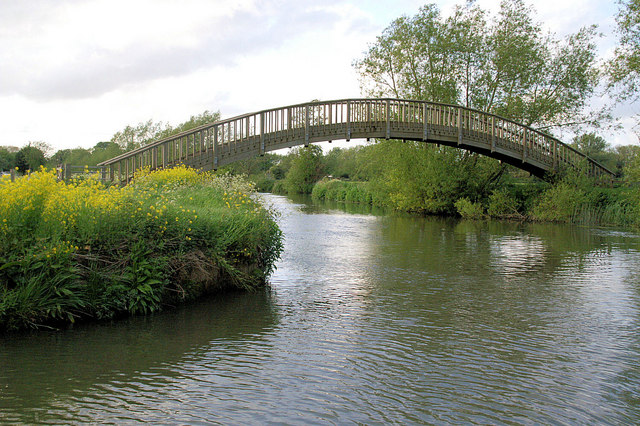
- Coordinates: 51.686611°N 1.675929°W
- Carries: Thames Path
- Crosses: River Thames
- Locale: Oxfordshire

Characteristics
- Material: Steel
- No. of spans: 1

History
- Designer: Charlie Benner
- Opened: 2000

Location
- Interactive map of Bloomers Hole Footbridge

Bloomers Hole Footbridge is a footbridge across the River Thames in Oxfordshire, England. It is situated on the reach above Buscot Lock and was installed in 2000 to carry the Thames Path across the Thames. It is built of steel encased in wood to make it look like a timber structure.

The Countryside Agency commissioned Oxfordshire County Council to design and build the bridge and the design was undertaken by Charlie Benner, the senior engineer. The bridge was installed in 2000. The two 27-metre (89 ft) 8-tonne steel beams were put in place by a Chinook helicopter from RAF Brize Norton.

Bloomer's Hole is at a wide bend about quarter of a mile downstream of St John's Lock. The river winds tortuously along here, and although a cut of the river across Bloomer Meadow was mooted as early as 1802, it was never implemented.

== See also ==
- Crossings of the River Thames

Next crossing upstream	River Thames	Next crossing downstream
St John's Bridge (road)	Bloomers Hole Footbridge	Buscot Lock (pedestrian)
Next crossing upstream	Thames Path	Next crossing downstream
southern bank Water Eaton House Bridge	Bloomers Hole Footbridge	northern bank Radcot Bridge
