= The Trout Inn =

The Trout Inn may refer to:

- The Trout Inn, Lechlade, Gloucestershire, England
- The Trout Inn, Lower Wolvercote, Oxfordshire, England
