= St Lawrence Church, Lechlade =

Coordinates: 51°41′38″N 1°41′26″W

St Lawrence Church
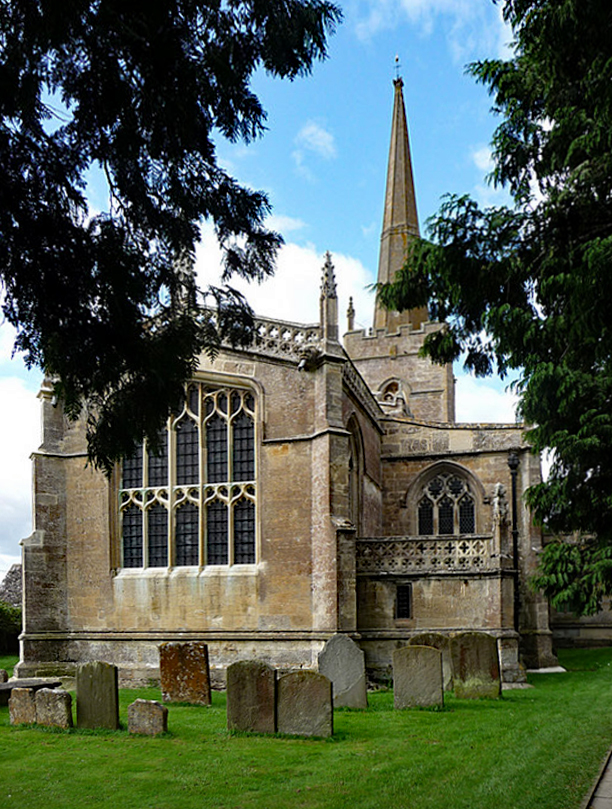

- Location within Gloucestershire
- Location: Lechlade, Gloucestershire
- Country: England
- Denomination: Church of England
- Website: https://www.stlawrencelechlade.org.uk/

Architecture
- Heritage designation: Grade I listed building
- Designated: 26 November 1958
- Completed: 1476

Administration
- Diocese: Diocese of Gloucester
- Archdeaconry: Cheltenham
- Deanery: Cirencester
- Benefice: South Cotswold Team Ministry
- Parish: Lechlade

Clergy
- Vicar: Dr Andrew Cinnamond

The Anglican St Lawrence Church, dedicated to St. Lawrence of Rome, is the Church of England parish church of Lechlade in Gloucestershire, England. The church building is Grade I listed and is described with admiration in Simon Jenkins's England's Thousand Best Churches.

The current church was built on the site of an earlier one and was completed in 1476. The roof and parts of the structure were replaced following a fire in the early 16th century. Various refurbishments have been undertaken since, including the installation of a gallery in 1740. Percy Bysshe Shelley composed a poem after visiting the churchyard in 1815.

The church is notable for its eight-sided spire above the tower. The internal fixtures and fittings include a brass chandelier, 13th-century piscina and carvings including the figure of the martyrdom of St Agatha.

== History ==
A church is known inferentially to have existed in Lechlade since at least 1210 when a fair was granted on St. Lawrence's day. It is known that this Church was one of the few in England that had the privilege of Sanctuary.

The present wool church replaced an earlier structure in 1476. This was funded by local townspeople and the dissolution of the Lechlade Priory, which was dissolved due to a lack of funds and which also provided building materials to the new church. The dedication of the church was originally to St Mary but changed in 1510 by Katherine of Aragon, who had come into possession of the manor of Lechlade in 1501.

The nave roof and clerestory, the north porch, and the tower and spire may have been added in the early 16th century following a fire in 1510. A west gallery for singers was installed in 1740 and there were further internal additions in the 1880s.

=== Literature ===
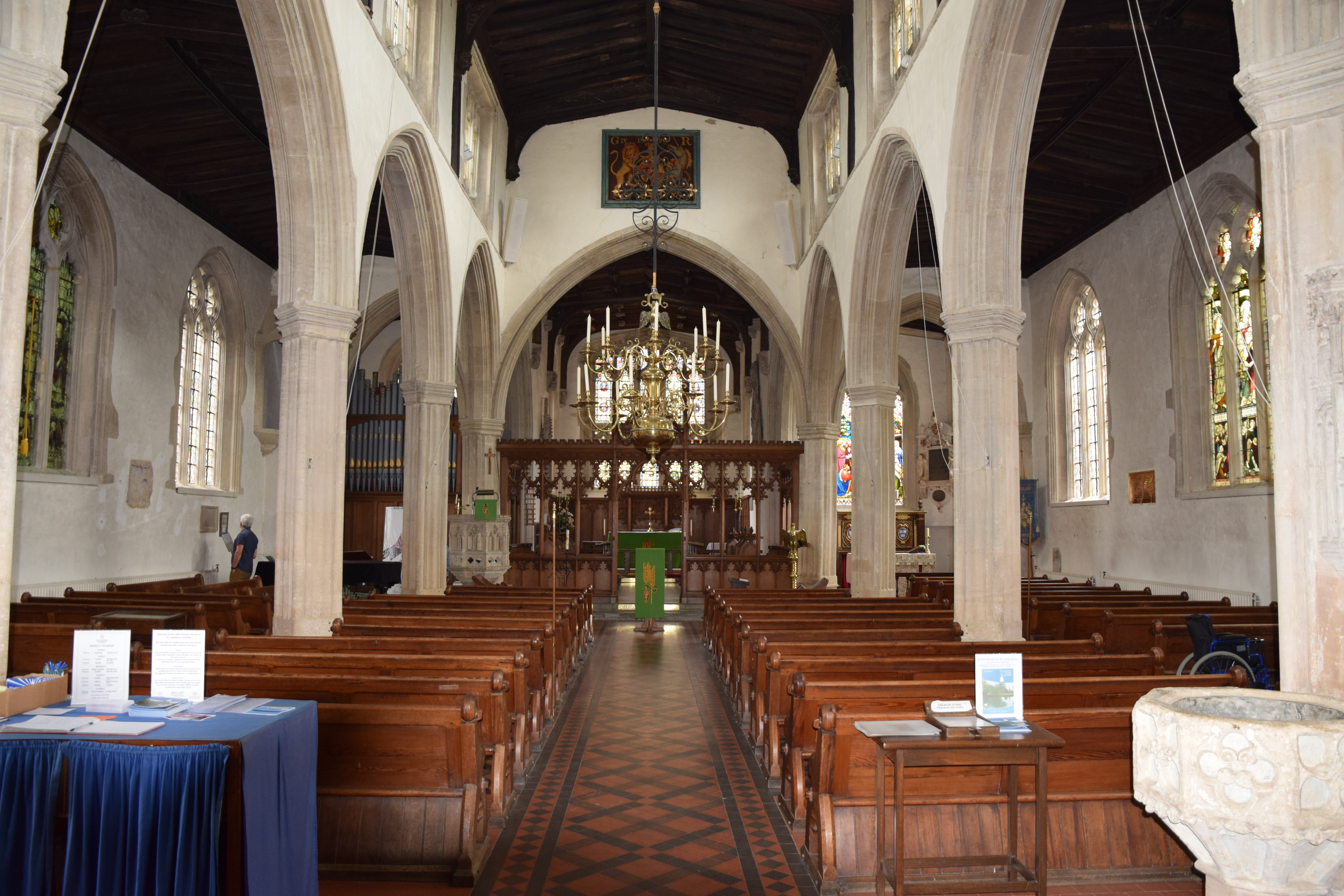
The interior of the church

In September 1815 Percy Bysshe Shelley visited Lechlade with his future wife Mary, her step-brother Charles Clairmont, and the novelist Thomas Love Peacock, and was moved to compose a poem, A Summer-Evening Churchyard, Lechlade, Gloucestershire, which was published the following year. The path through the churchyard is now named “Shelley's Walk”, in a tribute to the famous atheist.

=== Community ===
The Vicar is Dr Andrew Cinnamond. The church has strong links with the nearby St Lawrence Church of England Primary School.

The parish of Lechlade is part of the South Cotswold Team Ministry benefice within the Diocese of Gloucester.

== Architecture ==
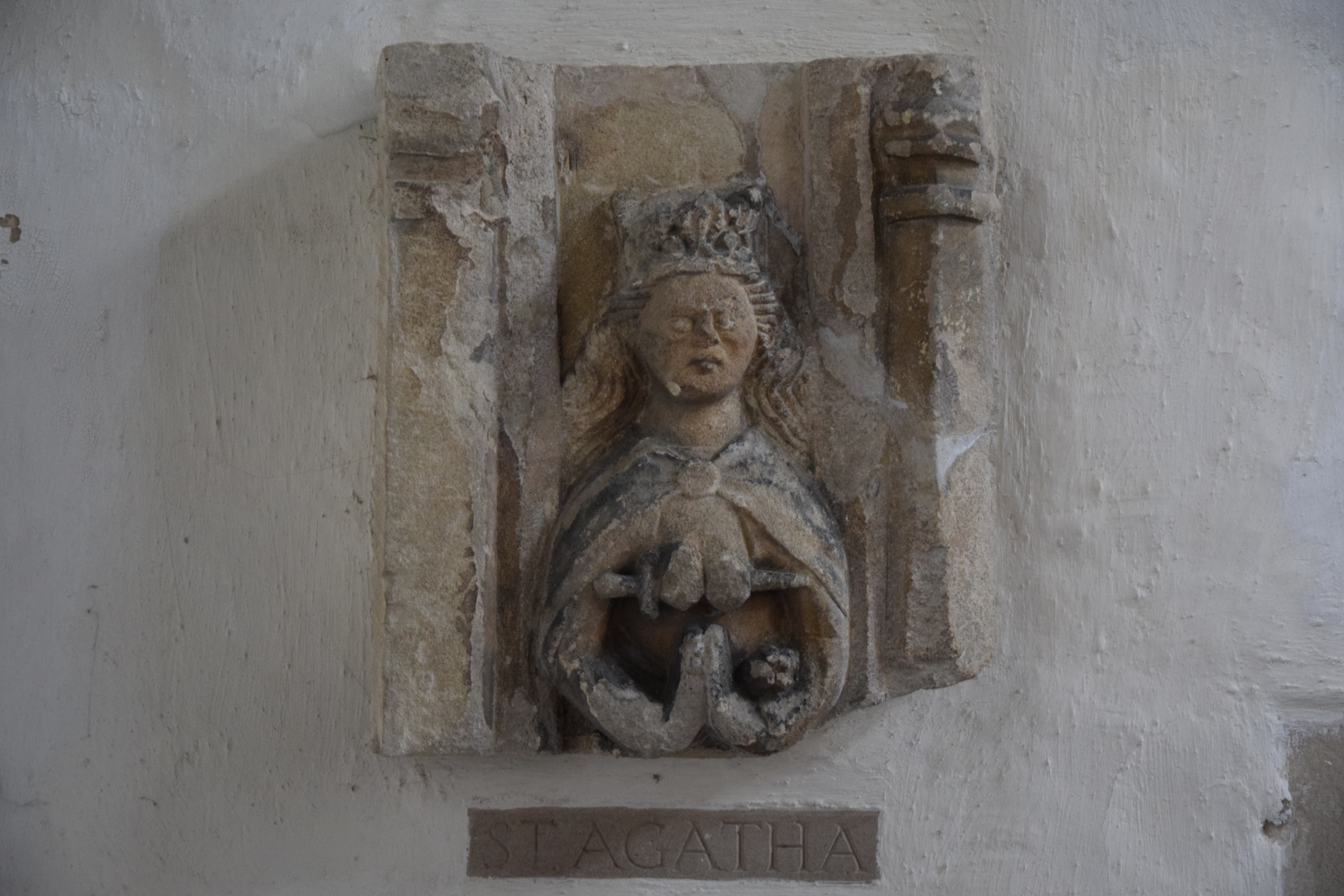
St Agatha

The church is of dressed freestone from Taynton Quarry near Burford. It consists of a nave with clerestory, four-bay aisles, north porch, north and south chancel chapels and chancel with a vestry on the north side. The three-stage west tower is supported by diagonal buttresses and topped with angle pinnacles, embattled parapet and an eight-sided spire. The bells in the tower are of various ages; the oldest of which is from 1590. The peal was rehung in 1911 when a new treble added, and again in 1966.

=== Fittings and fixtures ===
Some of the fittings including the 13th-century piscina, font and the figure of St Agatha in the north aisle are from the earlier church on the site. St Agatha is sculpted with a sword through her naked breasts depicting the nature of her martyrdom. The brass chandelier hanging from the ceiling is from 1730, and is inscribed "the gift of Mr Richard Ainge". The pulpit was added in 1882, but the base on which it stands is much older and was found in the vicarage garden.

There are some medieval brasses and marble monuments. Under the stained glass east window is a wooden reredos with a carving of Agnus Dei.

=== Graveyard ===
The graveyard is now closed for burials, with modern burials taking place in the town cemetery, but it includes many gravestones dating back hundreds of years. Chest tombs include those to William Hobbs, Ann Lambert, William Giles, Sarah Pace, Henry Yeatman, Thomas and John Walker, William Gearing, Mary Sophia Matthews, Thomas Hipsley, Mary Anne Walker, John Raven, William and Elizabeth Hobbs, Thomas Andrews, John Taylor, William and Thomas Hall and multiple unidentified monuments.
