= Old Man's Bridge =

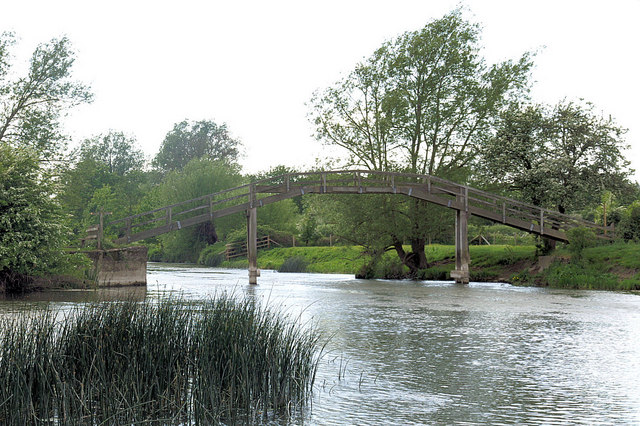
- Coordinates: 51.699932°N 1.568325°W
- Carries: Footpath
- Crosses: River Thames
- Locale: Oxfordshire

Characteristics
- Material: Wood
- Height: 14 feet 0 inches (4.27 m)

History
- Opened: 1894

Old Man's Bridge is a wooden footbridge across the River Thames in Oxfordshire, England. It is situated on the reach above Rushey Lock, a short way downstream of Radcot Lock.

There was formerly a weir known as Old Man's Weir, or alternatively Harper's Weir, which had a footpath across it. This was an important crossing because it linked several towns. The weir had disappeared by 1868 but the bridge was still standing then as there were complaints about its poor state of repair. The weir piles were then removed and a new footbridge built. This bridge was also called the "High" bridge. By 1894 this "steep trestle with five openings had become unsafe and the present bridge was built."

The original weir is not to be confused with "Old Nan's Weir" which was another weir downstream about a mile from Rushey Lock. Although the lock was built in 1790, the weir was not removed until 1868.

== See also ==
- Crossings of the River Thames

Next crossing upstream	River Thames	Next crossing downstream
Radcot Bridge (road)	Old Man's Bridge	Rushey Lock (pedestrian)
