= Grafton and Radcot =

Coordinates: 51.700°N 1.604°W

- Civil parish
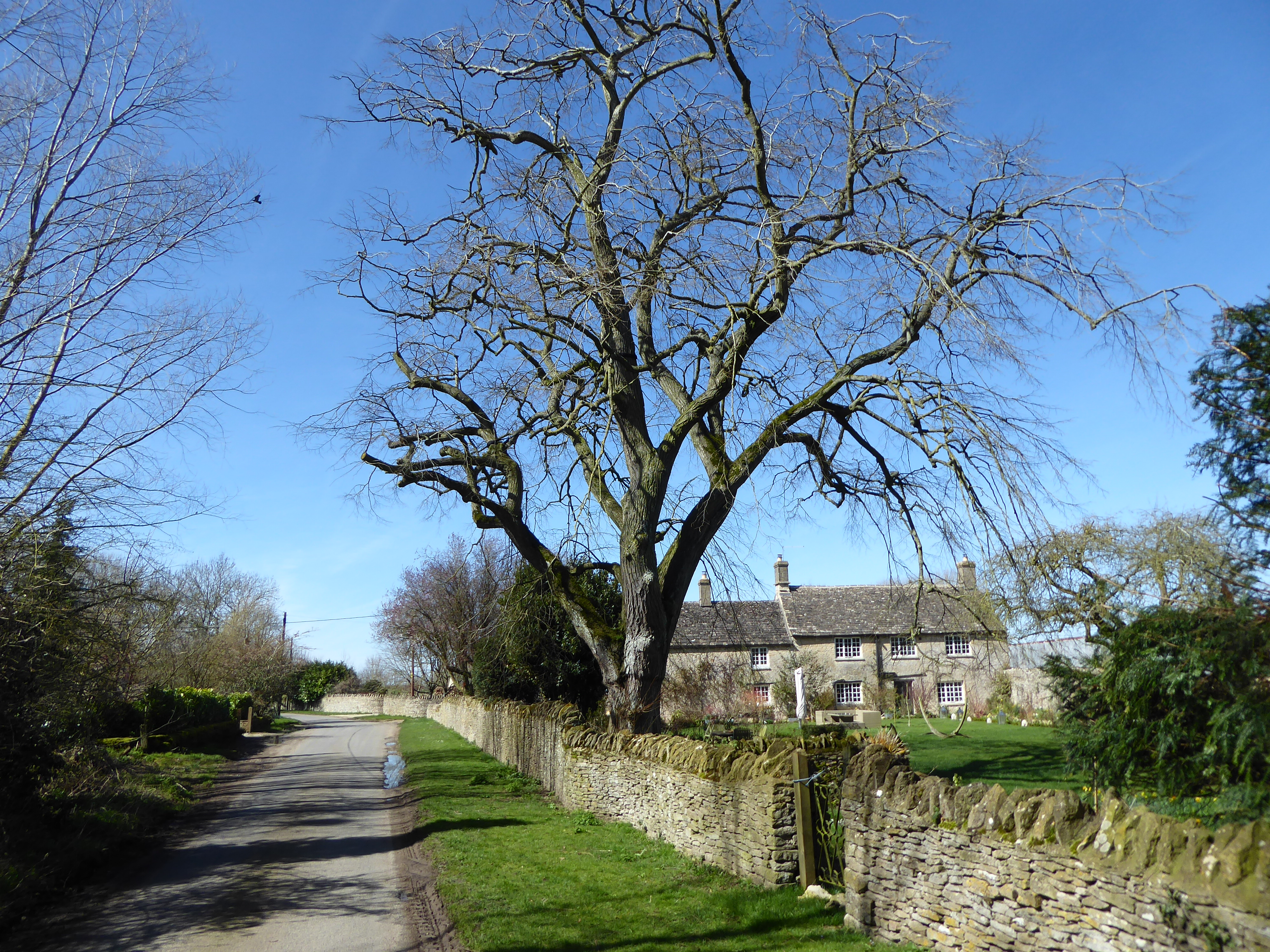
- Poplar Farm, Grafton

- Location within Oxfordshire
- Population: 63 (Parish, 2021)
- Civil parish: Grafton and Radcot
- District: West Oxfordshire
- Shire county: Oxfordshire
- Region: South East
- Country: England
- Sovereign state: United Kingdom
- Post town: Bampton
- Postcode district: OX18
- Dialling code: 01993
- Police: Thames Valley
- Fire: Oxfordshire
- Ambulance: South Central
- UK Parliament: Witney

Grafton and Radcot is a civil parish in the West Oxfordshire district of Oxfordshire, England. The parish includes the hamlets of Radcot, on the north bank of the River Thames, and Grafton. The parish lies 3 miles (5 km) south-west of Bampton, its post town. At the 2021 census the parish had a population of 63.

== History ==
The parish has its origins as two townships of the ancient parish of Langford. Each of Langford's four township took on civil functions under the poor laws from the 17th century onwards. As such, the four townships each became separate civil parishes in 1866 when the legal definition of 'parish' was changed to be the areas used for administering the poor laws. The two civil parishes of Radcot and Grafton were subsequently merged into a new civil parish called Grafton and Radcot in 1932.

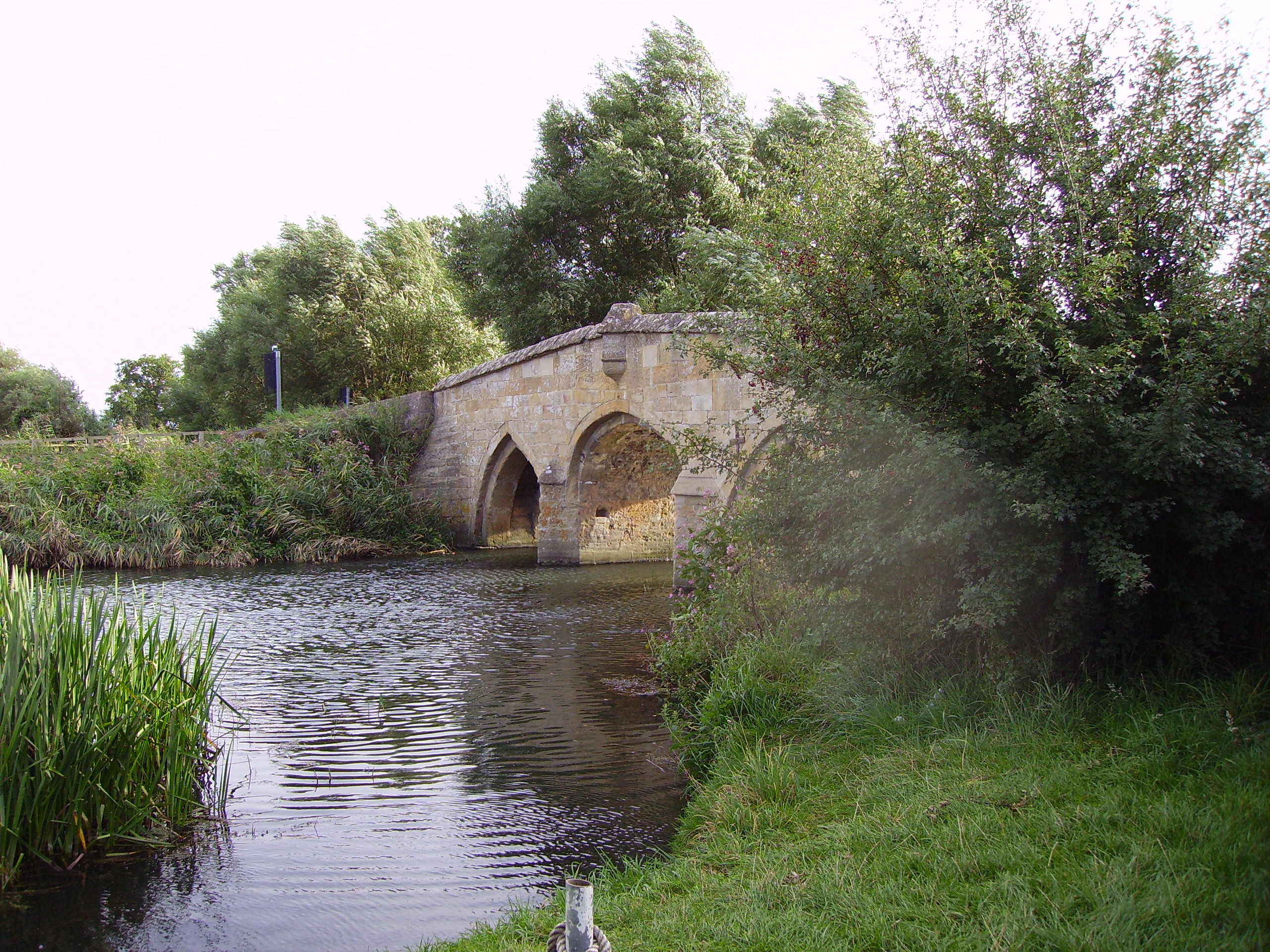
Radcot Bridge over the River Thames, which forms the southern boundary of the parish

== Governance ==
There are two elected tiers of local government covering Grafton and Radcot, at district and county level: West Oxfordshire District Council, and Oxfordshire County Council. The parish is too small to have an elected parish council, and so has a parish meeting instead.
