= Grafton, Oxfordshire =

Hamlet in Oxfordshire, England

Coordinates: 51.704°N 1.613°W

Grafton
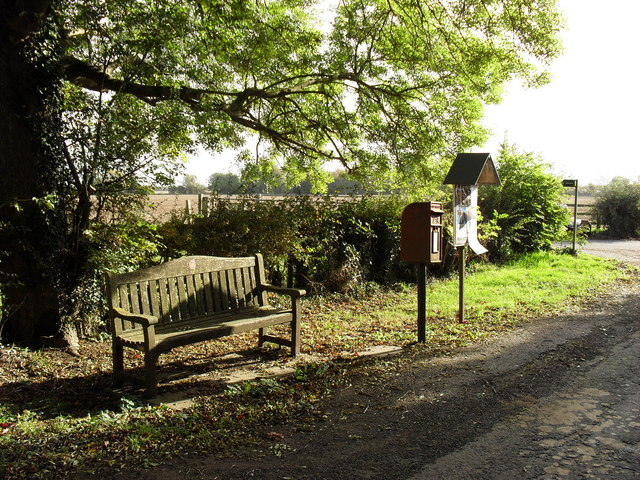
- The centre of Grafton

- Location within Oxfordshire
- OS grid reference: SP2600
- Civil parish: Grafton and Radcot
- District: West Oxfordshire
- Shire county: Oxfordshire
- Region: South East
- Country: England
- Sovereign state: United Kingdom
- Post town: Bampton
- Postcode district: OX18
- Dialling code: 01993
- Police: Thames Valley
- Fire: Oxfordshire
- Ambulance: South Central
- UK Parliament: Witney

Grafton is a hamlet in the civil parish of Grafton and Radcot, in the West Oxfordshire district of Oxfordshire, England. It is in the Thames Valley, about 3 1/2 miles (5.6 km) north of Faringdon. Grafton Lock is on the River Thames about 1 mile (1.6 km) south of the hamlet.

== History ==
Grafton was historically a township in the ancient parish of Langford. Each of Langford's four township took on civil functions under the poor laws from the 17th century onwards. As such, the four townships each became separate civil parishes in 1866 when the legal definition of 'parish' was changed to be the areas used for administering the poor laws.

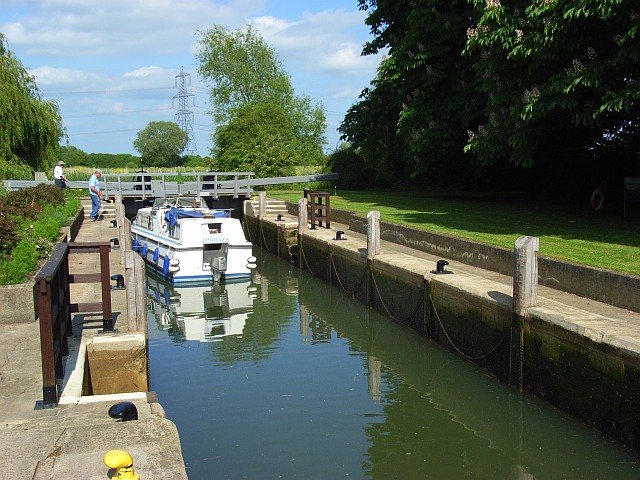
Grafton Lock

The two civil parishes of Grafton and Radcot (another of the former townships of Langford) were subsequently merged into a new civil parish called Grafton and Radcot in 1932. At the 1931 census (the last before the abolition of the parish), Grafton had a population of 54.
