= River Cole =

The River Cole may refer to:

- River Cole, West Midlands, England, which flows directly through Birmingham
- River Cole, Wiltshire, England, which flows through Wiltshire and Oxfordshire, where it forms the border
