= Grafton Lock Meadow =

Protected area in Oxfordshire, England

Coordinates: 51.6887°N 1.6063°W

Grafton Lock Meadow is a Site of Special Scientific Interest (SSSI) in Oxfordshire, England. It is located 2km east of Kelmscott and is situated on the bank of the River Thames directly south of Grafton Lock. This area is protected because this meadow has not been improved with modern fertilisers and has long been managed traditionally for hay and autumn pasture. This meadow is celebrated for its population of the plant called snake's-head fritillary.

== Biology ==
Grafton Lock Meadow is an area of neutral grassland on damp alluvial soils that floods in winter. Herbaceous plant species in this meadow include meadow-rue, yellow rattle, meadowsweet, pepper saxifrage, cowslip, lady's bedstraw and snake's-head fritillary. Fern species include adder's tongue.

== Land ownership ==
Part of the land within Grafton Lock Meadow SSSI is owned by the National Trust.
