= Battle of Radcot Bridge =

1387 battle in England

Coordinates: 51.6931°N 1.589°W

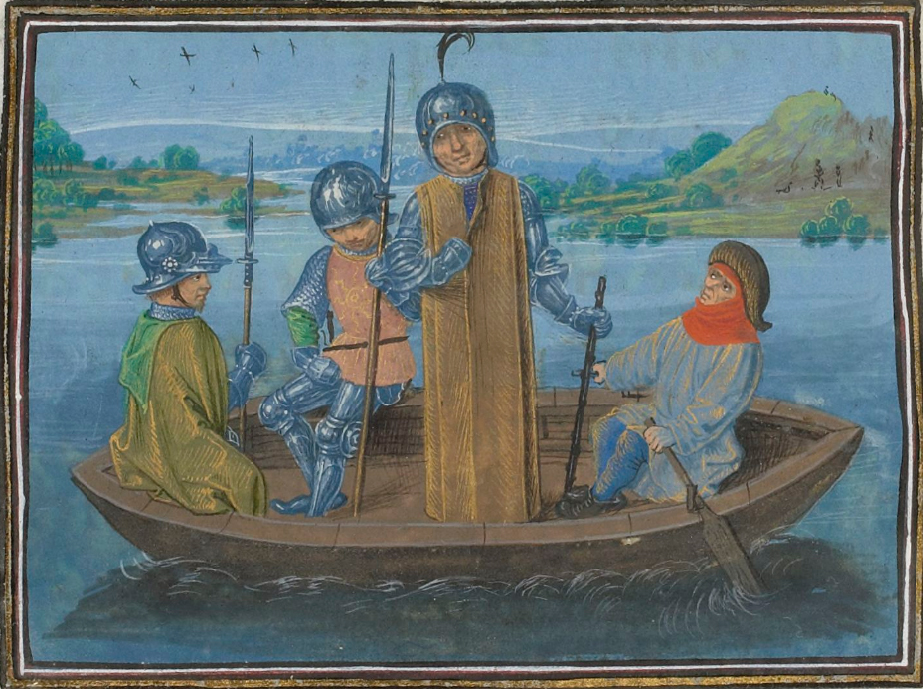
- Robert de Vere fleeing Radcot Bridge, from the Gruthuse manuscript of Froissart's Chroniques (c. 1475).
Date	19 December 1387
Location	Radcot Bridge, Oxfordshire
Result	Lords Appellant victory

Belligerents
Kingdom of England	Lords Appellant

Commanders and leaders
Earl of Oxford	Earl of Northampton

Strength
c. 4,000	c. 4,500

Casualties and losses
3	None

The Battle of Radcot Bridge was fought on 19 December 1387 in medieval England between troops loyal to Richard II, led by court favourite Robert de Vere, Earl of Oxford, and an army captained by Henry Bolingbroke, Earl of Northampton. It took place at Radcot Bridge, a bridge over the River Thames, now in Oxfordshire, but then the boundary between Oxfordshire and Berkshire.

== Background ==
The previous year had seen increasing hostility between the young King Richard II and his magnates. This crisis reached a head in November 1386, when the Wonderful Parliament compelled King Richard to remove his chancellor, Michael de la Pole.

According to the 16th-century chronicler Raphael Holinshed:

In 1387, King Richard II sent secretly to Robert de Vere, Duke of Ireland, who was levying troops in Wales, to come to him with all speed, to aid him with the Duke of Gloucester and his friends; and commissioned at the same time Sir Thomas Molineux de Cuerdale, Constable of Chester, a man of great influence in Cheshire and Lancashire, and the Sheriff of Chester, to raise troops, and to accompany and safe conduct the Duke of Ireland to the King's presence. Molineux executed his commission with great zeal, imprisoning all who would not join him. Thus was raised an army of 5,000 men. The Duke of Ireland, having with him Molineux, Vernon and Ratcliffe, rode forward "in statelie and glorious arraie." Supposing that none durst come forth to withstand him. Nevertheless, when he came to Radcot Bridge, 21 miles from Chipping Norton, he suddenly espied the army of the lords; and finding that some of his troops refused to fight, he began to wax faint-hearted, and to prepare to escape by flight, in which he succeeded; but Thomas Molineux determined to fight it out. Nevertheless, when he had fought a little, and perceived it would not avail him to tarry longer, he likewise, as one despairing of the victory, betook himself to flight; and plunging into the river, it chanced that Sir Roger Mortimer, being present, amongst others, called him to come out of the water to him, threatening to shoot him through with arrows, in the river, if he did not. "If I come," said Molineux, "will ye save my life?" "I will make ye no such promise," replied Sir Roger Mortimer, "but, notwithstanding, either come up, or thou shalt presently die for it." "Well then," said Molineux, "if there be no other remedy, suffer me to come up, and let me try with hand blows, either with you or some other, and so die like a man." But as he came up, the knight caught him by the helmet, plucked it off his head, and straightways drawing his dagger, stroke him into the brains, and so dispatched him. Molineux, a varlet, and a boy were the only slain in the engagement; 800 men fled into the marsh, and were drowned; the rest were surrounded, stript, and sent home. The Duke of Ireland made his escape to the Continent; and the King returned to London.

In the words of a modern English historian:

De Vere's army arrived at the twin Thames bridges, only to find the first sabotaged and the second guarded by Derby's troops. Gloucester's men were still closing in from the north. The Royalists turned and deserted at the first shock of Bolingbroke's pikes. They could only surrender or else make desperate rushes over or through the river in an attempt to escape. Mounting a fresh horse, De Vere pushed forward but, with Pidnell Bridge demolished, the terrified Earl was forced to have his mount leap into the river and face up stream. Hugging the bank, he lightened his load by dropping his gauntlets, sword and casque. At Radcot Bridge, stood a company of archers. Dodging their deadly arrows through the stream again, he sought a ford but none was to be found. As night came on, he slipped from his horse, put off his cuirass, plunged into the stream, and swimming across, escaped with the loss of everything but life and limb.

Hiding in the woods by day, De Vere stole away into the western shires where, for a while, he was safe. His enemies believed him dead. Horse, casque, sword and cuirass being found next morning by the riverbank, his pursuers fancied that he had been drowned. However, he eventually managed to flee to France, where he died in exile. With their victory at Radcot Bridge, the 'Lords Appellant' were able to gain a short-lived control over the country. This culminated in the Merciless Parliament in which King Richard's main allies were condemned.

It is strange that Pidnell is the more northerly of the two bridges and Radcot the southerly, while the villages are the other way round. The present Radcot Bridge, spanning the southern branch of the River Thames and the Berkshire-Oxfordshire Boundary, is of 14th-century date and is therefore the one that stood during the battle. Apparently a memorial to the dead, now lost, was placed upon it in 1393.

In August 1387 King Richard retaliated; he assembled a Council of magistrates at Nottingham and attempted to redefine the royal prerogative so as to render the Wonderful Parliament treasonous. The leaders of the Parliament, including Richard's uncle Thomas of Woodstock, Duke of Gloucester, hit back during the Miraculous or Merciless Parliament of November 1387. During this session, Woodstock and the Earls of Warwick and Arundel submitted an appeal which accused several of Richard's closest friends of routinely deceiving the King for their own profit.

== Preparatory events ==
Richard responded by summoning Woodstock and the other Lords Appellant to the Tower of London; all three refused.

This was open dissent, and both Richard and the Appellants knew the implications of such defiance. According to the author of the Eulogium historiarum, Richard asked Woodstock whether his companions were willing to take arms against him, to which the Duke replied: "we do not rebel or arm ourselves against the King except in order to instruct him".

Pushed further by Richard, who protested that Parliament did not have the right to command a King even in the case of "the meanest kitchen boy", the Duke darkly reminded his nephew of his own standing: "But I am the son of a king".

Fearing deposition, King Richard ordered that the citizens of London should take up arms. De Vere was despatched to Cheshire, where King Richard had assembled an army of five thousand retainers, under the direct command of Sir Thomas Molineux. De Vere now took these southwards towards London.

== Battle ==
The most direct routes to the capital were blocked by Arundel's men, so de Vere decided to cross the Thames at Radcot, near Faringdon. However, the bridge itself was under the guard of Derby's troops; they had also partly dismantled its structure. Undeterred, de Vere gave the command to storm the crossing. At this point, a larger force of Derby's men arrived from the north, effectively surrounding the Cheshiremen. De Vere managed to escape the field, eventually making his way to France; once it was known that he had fled, his army promptly surrendered. Among the handful of casualties was Molyneux himself, who was killed during the abortive attempt to cross the Thames.

== Aftermath ==
After the battle, Woodstock and the other Appellants held a council with Richard at the Tower. Richard had no means of resisting their demands, and it was agreed that a further Parliament should be called in February 1388. The resulting Merciless Parliament saw a full-scale purge of Richard's household.

On Saturday 22 September 1397 Sir Thomas Mortimer was summoned to stand trial as a traitor. Mortimer's alleged crime was the slaying of Thomas Molineux, constable of Chester Castle, at the skirmish at Radcot Bridge in 1387. Molineux had been one of the most important Royal agents in the Chester Palinate, and had been responsible for the daily exercise of de Vere's power in the region. In spite of Richard II's enduring resentment against the killer of his trusted servant, there were deeper political considerations behind the proceedings against a man who had been merely one of many gentry supporters of the Appellants.
