= St Peter's Church, Southrop =

Coordinates: 51.7291°N 1.7088°W

St Peter's, Southrop
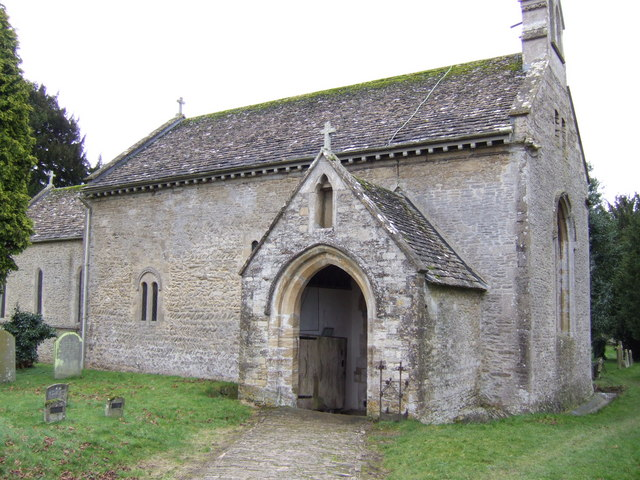
- St Peter's Church from the north

- Location in Gloucestershire
- OS grid reference: SP 20209 03420
- Location: Southrop, Gloucestershire
- Country: England
- Denomination: Anglican

History
- Status: Parish church

Architecture
- Functional status: Active
- Heritage designation: Grade I

Administration
- Province: Canterbury
- Diocese: Gloucester
- Archdeaconry: Cheltenham
- Deanery: Fairford

St Peter's Church is an Anglican church in Southrop, a Cotswolds village in the English county of Gloucestershire. It is an active parish church in the Diocese of Gloucester and the archdeaconry of Cheltenham. It has been designated a Grade I listed building by English Heritage. The church—on the site of an older structure—dates from the 12th century.

== History and assessment ==
A church existed on the site in Anglo-Saxon times. The earliest part of the current structure dates from the 12th century. The Rev. John Keble was vicar of St Peter's from 1823 to 1825. During his time at Southrop, he found a Norman-style circular baptismal font in the church wall.

St Peter's was designated a Grade I listed building by English Heritage on 16 January 1961. The Grade I designation—the highest of the three grades—is for buildings "of exceptional interest, sometimes considered to be internationally important". In his 1982 work Cotswold Churches, David Verey described St Peter's as a "most precious" church.

An active parish church in the Church of England, St Peter's is part of the Diocese of Gloucester, which is in the Province of Canterbury. It is in the archdeaconry of Cheltenham and the Deanery of Fairford.

Model Kate Moss and guitarist Jamie Hince were married at the church on 2 July 2011.

== Architecture ==
=== Exterior ===
St Peter's is built of limestone rubble and has a stone slate roof. The masonry has herringbone work. The plan consists of a nave with a south transept, a porch to the north, and a chancel to the east. The north entrance is Norman-style ("on quite a grand scale for a small church"); the round arch of the porch has roll moulding. The church doorway's jamb shafts have capitals with volutes. In the hood mould there is a tympanum with a diaper pattern.

The north and south nave walls each have a window dating from the 12th century, and a later two-light window from the 19th century. The nave also has a three-light Perpendicular style window with tracery. The east window in the chancel contains stained glass from 1852 designed by Thomas Willement.

=== Interior and fittings ===
The arch between the nave and chancel is Norman-style without moulding. There are two piscinae (basins) in the south wall of the chancel. The baptismal font discovered by Rev. John Keble in the 1820s is circular. It has eight arches and relief figures that include the Virtues (depicted as trampling the vices underfoot) and Moses. Monuments inside the church include effigies to Thomas and Elizabeth Conway, and memorials to the Keble family.

=== Churchyard ===
The churchyard contains war graves of a soldier of World War I and another of World War II.

== See also ==
- Grade I listed buildings in Gloucestershire
