= St John's Lock =

Lock on the River Thames in Gloucestershire, England

Coordinates: 51.68932°N 1.68025°W

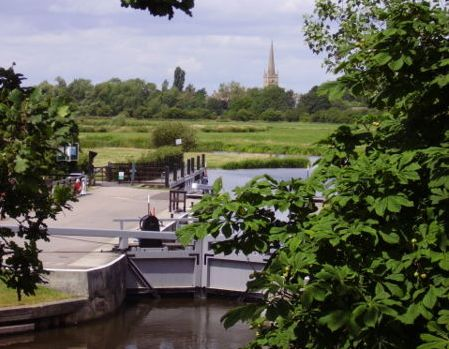
- St John's Lock, with Lechlade in the background
- Interactive map of St John's Lock
- Waterway: River Thames
- County: Gloucestershire
- Maintained by: Environment Agency
- Operation: Manual
- First built: 1790
- Latest built: 1905
- Length: 33.60 m (110 ft 3 in)
- Width: 4.52 m (14 ft 10 in)
- Fall: 0.85 m (2 ft 9 in)
- Above sea level: 233 ft (71 m)
- Distance to Teddington Lock: 123 miles

St John's Lock, below the town of Lechlade, Gloucestershire, is the furthest upstream lock on the River Thames in England. The name of the lock derives from a priory that was established nearby in 1250, but which no longer exists. The lock was built of stone in 1790 by the Thames Navigation Commission.

The main weir is downstream, just below St John's Bridge, where the River Cole and the River Leach join the Thames on opposite banks.

A statue of Old Father Thames by Raffaelle Monti is outside the lock house. The statue was commissioned in 1854 for The Crystal Palace's grounds, was later moved to the traditional source of the Thames at Thames Head, and then in 1974 relocated to St John's Lock. The statue is Grade II listed.

== History ==
The need for a pound lock here arose from the opening of the Thames and Severn Canal upstream in November 1789. It was built by J. Nock in 1790, and in its early days complaints were made of tolls being evaded by bullying bargemen. The first lock house was built in 1830, the lock-keeper being required to give up residence at the Trout Inn in accordance with Commission's rule that lock-keepers should not be publicans. The lock was reported to be in a poor state by 1857 and in 1867 was repaired. In 1905 the lock was rebuilt and a new lock-keeper's bungalow built on the other side of the lock.

== Access to the lock ==
The lock can be reached easily from St John's Bridge which is about a mile out of Lechlade on the A417 road.

== Reach above the lock ==
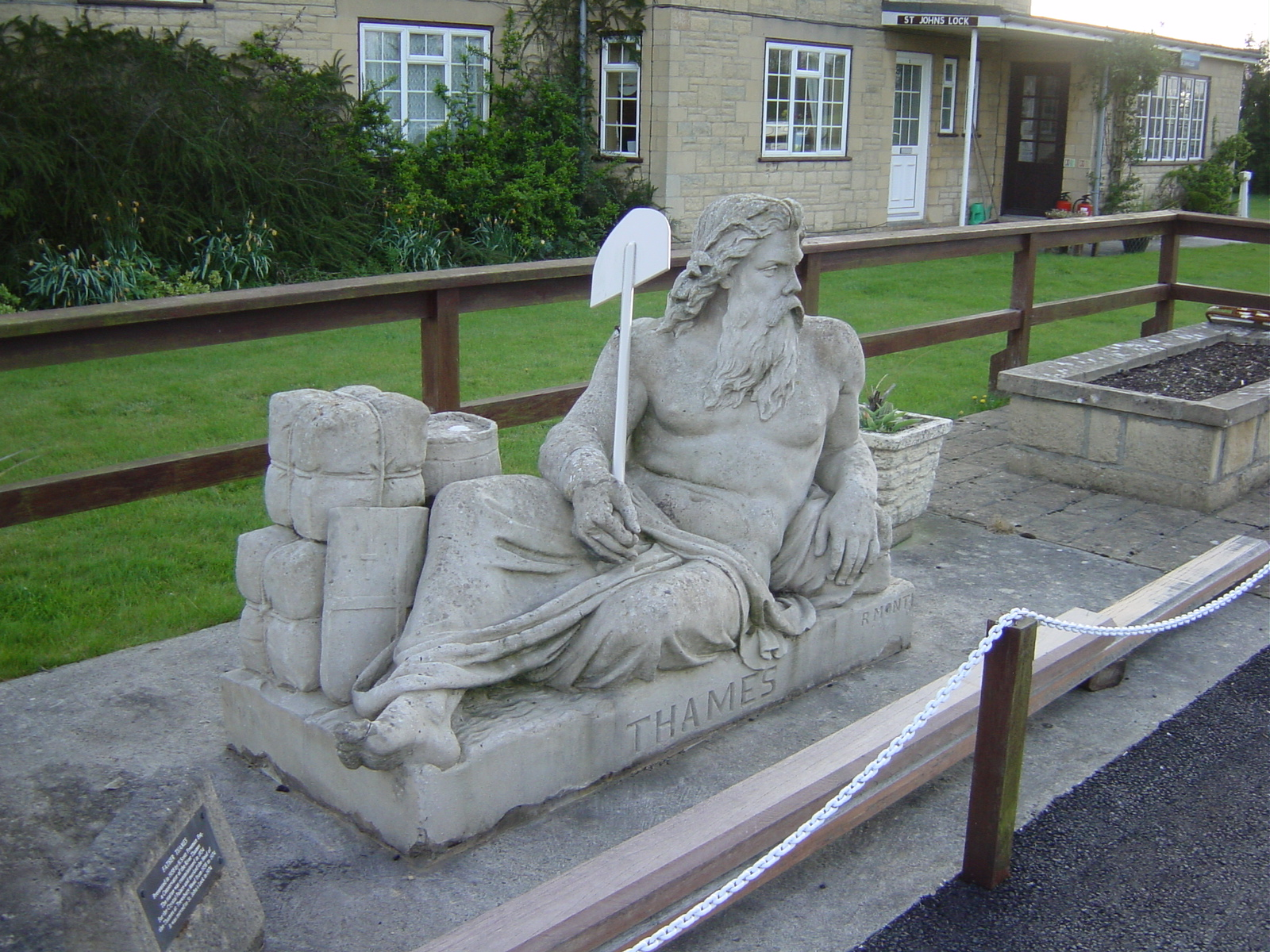
Statue of Father Thames by Rafaelle Monti at St John's Lock

The river winds for three quarters of a mile to Lechlade, where it passes under Halfpenny Bridge (or Ha'penny Bridge), which is so named because it was once a toll bridge. Half a mile after Lechlade there is a connection to the former Thames and Severn Canal, which linked the Thames to the River Severn via the Stroudwater Navigation and the Gloucester and Sharpness Canal. The Thames and Severn Canal is the subject of a restoration plan, and so navigation beyond Lechlade may one day be possible again. The River Coln also joins the Thames at the canal junction, where there is sufficient room to wind a 70 ft narrowboat with care. There are no more locks upstream on the River Thames, with Lechlade normally considered to be the end of the navigable river, but there is a right of navigation as far as Cricklade, and small craft may be able to travel for a further three miles beyond Lechlade when there is plenty of water.

The Thames Path follows the remaining towpath along the southern bank past Lechlade to Inglesham, extending as far as the connection with the now disused Thames and Severn Canal, one and a half miles upstream.

== See also ==
- Locks on the River Thames

Next lock upstream	River Thames	Next lock downstream
None; Lechlade 1.2 km (0.75 mi)	St John's Lock; Grid reference: SU222990	Buscot Lock; 1.85 km (1.15 mi)
