= Eaton Footbridge =

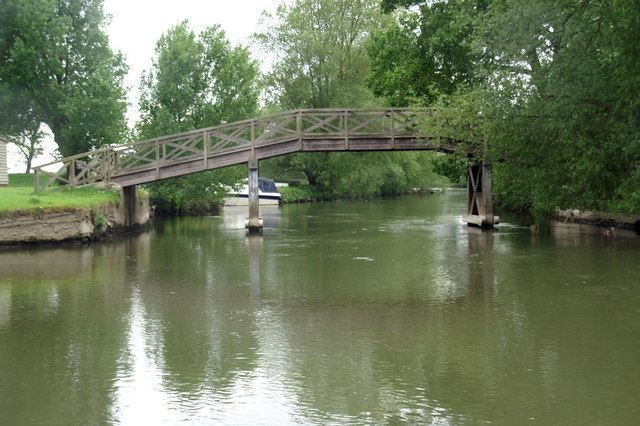
- Coordinates: 51.685531°N 1.644331°W
- Carries: Footpath
- Crosses: River Thames
- Locale: Oxfordshire

Characteristics
- Material: Wood
- Height: 9 ft 9 in (2.97 m)

History
- Opened: 1936

Eaton Footbridge is a wooden footbridge across the River Thames in Oxfordshire, England. It is situated on the reach above Grafton Lock.

The bridge was built in 1936 on the site of the last flash lock on the river which was in a weir known as Hart's Weir. The weir and lock, the last remaining on the Thames, were removed that year leaving the mooring cuts which are still in use. There was a lock keeper at the weir and a walkway across which is the precedent for the current bridge. The flash lock was notoriously difficult and Thacker quoted Henry Taunt: "I recollect one winter in passing this very weir, when lying on my back in the boat to get through, scraping a fair amount of skin off my nose and face though contact with the bridge whilst going under it."

== See also ==
- Crossings of the River Thames

| Next crossing upstream | River Thames | Next crossing downstream |
| Buscot Lock (pedestrian) | Eaton Footbridge | Radcot Bridge (road) |
