= Rushey Lock =

Lock on the River Thames in Oxfordshire, England

Coordinates: 51.69782°N 1.53405°W

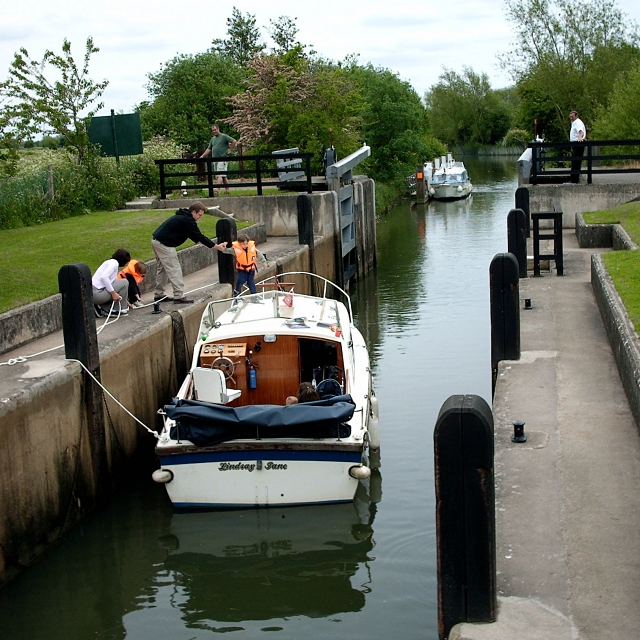
- Waterway: River Thames
- County: Oxfordshire
- Maintained by: Environment Agency
- Operation: Manual
- First built: 1790
- Latest built: 1898
- Length: 34.59 m (113 ft 6 in)
- Width: 4.59 m (15 ft 1 in)
- Fall: 1.82 m (6 ft 0 in)
- Above sea level: 66 m (216 ft)
- Distance to Teddington Lock: 114 miles (183 km)

Rushey Lock is a lock on the River Thames in England. It is on the northern bank of the river in Oxfordshire, at a considerable distance from any village, the nearest being Buckland Marsh, a hamlet on the road to Buckland to the south of the river.

The lock was built in stone in 1790 by the Thames Navigation Commission. The weir is adjacent to the lock on the other side of the lock island.

== History ==
There was originally a weir and flash lock about a mile upstream called Old Nan's Weir. A survey made in 1790 concluded that the site was unsuitable for a pound lock, and it was built at Rushey instead. There is no record of an earlier weir or lock at Rushey. Keepers at Rushey had oversight of Old Nan's Weir which was finally removed in 1868. Rushey lock was reported as in a bad state of deterioration in 1857 and the weir also in 1871, repairs being needed on both occasions. The lock keeper's house with a pyramidical roof was built in 1894, replacing an older one, and the lock was rebuilt in 1898.

== Access to the lock ==
There is a road to the lock from Tadpole Bridge downstream.

== Reach above the lock ==
The river is very twisty along this reach. A short way before Radcot Lock is Old Man's Bridge which is on the site of a former weir.

The Thames Path follows the southern bank to Radcot Lock.

== See also ==
- Locks on the River Thames
- Crossings of the River Thames

Next crossing upstream	River Thames	Next crossing downstream
Old Man's Bridge (pedestrian)	Rushey Lock	Tadpole Bridge (road)
Next lock upstream	River Thames	Next lock downstream
Radcot Lock; 4.23 km (2.63 mi)	Rushey Lock; Grid reference: SP323000	Shifford Lock; 6.92 km (4.30 mi)
