= Eastleach House =

- Location in Gloucestershire
- 51°44′41.64″N 01°42′24.84″W
- Location: Eastleach Martin, Gloucestershire, England

Eastleach House is Grade II listed country house in Eastleach Martin, Gloucestershire, designed by the architect Walter Cave and completed in 1900.

== History ==
The property in Eastleach Martin was built by the Bazley family late in the 19th century on the site of an earlier 19th-century farmhouse. It was completed in 1900. Gardner Sebastian Bazley son of Sir Thomas Bazley built the house for his daughter as a wedding present, using stone from two ruined local houses: Blunsden Abbey (which, in particular, supplied the medieval grotesques which decorate the wings of the west elevation) and Paul's Castle.

The house was originally called Ravens Hill until the name was changed by the present owner.

It was designed by Walter Cave, architect, stylistically the house is Cotswold manor house, Jacobean Revival. The exterior is constructed of coursed rubble oolithic limestone with ashlar and a stone slate roof.

The interior is decorated, in the arts and craft style, with simple panelling and boldly projecting, simplified mouldings. The fireplaces, though classically derived, have attenuated column mantelshelf supports rather similar to Charles Voysey's designs; the central hall fireplace has a carved datestone: 'GSB 1900'. The involved shape of the oak staircase in the central hall forms a half-landing above the main entrance lobby.

The stable and coach house were built for the previous house on this site.

The house is not open to the public.

== Gardens ==
The creation of the current gardens began in 1982 when the house was acquired by Stephanie and David Richards. The gardens cover 14 acres (57,000 m^{2}), and include a walled garden, a garden with a stone rill running through it, the south-facing lawn, and a 10-acre (40,000 m^{2}) park. Designed to follow the natural contours of the land, the gardens present the different and contrasting aspects—from the smooth lawns to the avenue, parkland and arboretum—of a traditional English country garden. The gardens are not open to the public.
