= Eastleach =

Civil parish in Gloucestershire, England

Coordinates: 51.746°N 1.709°W

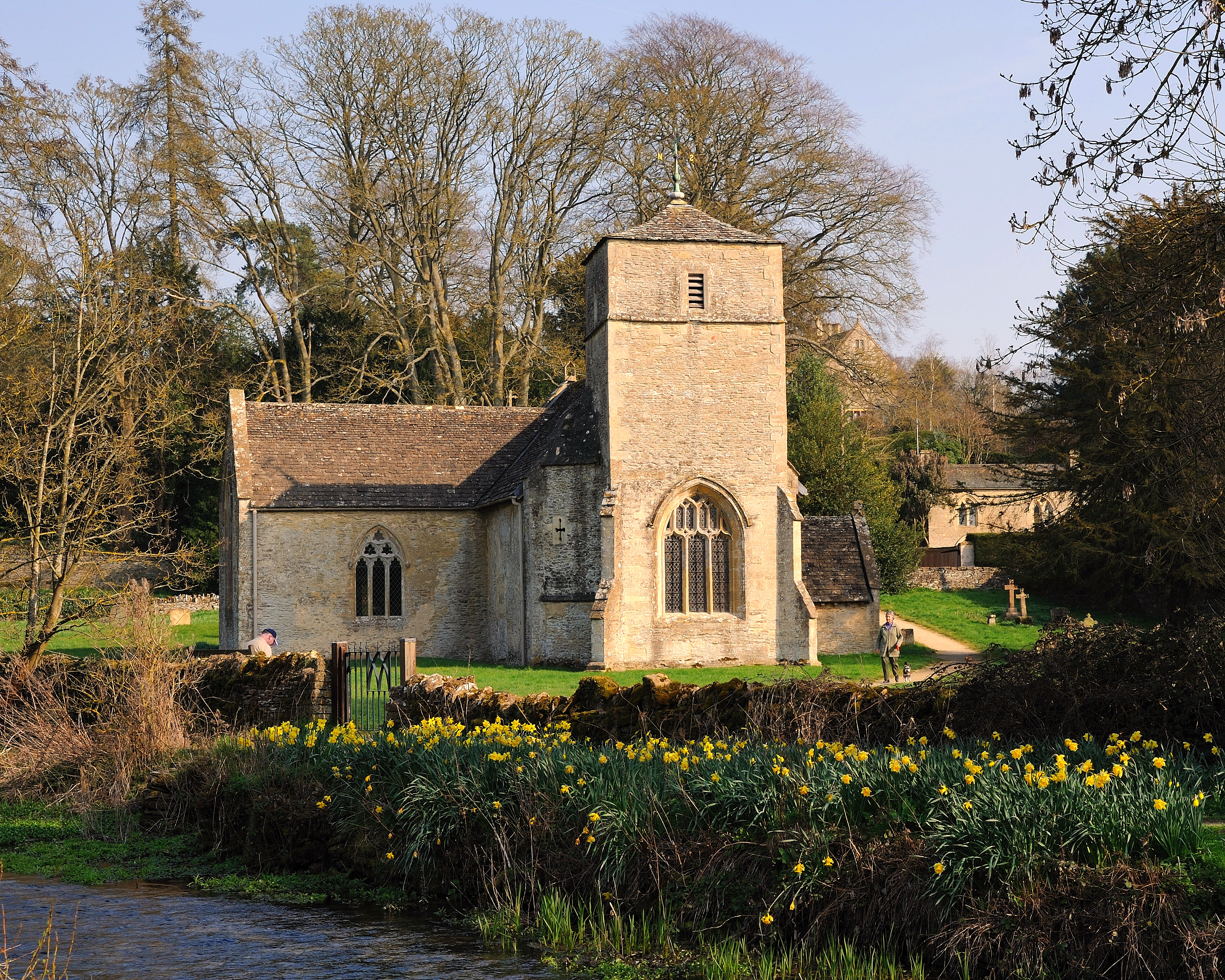
- St. Michael & St. Martin

- Location within Gloucestershire
- Population: 306 (2011)
- OS grid reference: SO2016905239
  - London: 84 mi (135 km)
- District: Cotswold
- Shire county: Gloucestershire
- Region: South West
- Country: England
- Sovereign state: United Kingdom
- Post town: CIRENCESTER
- Postcode district: GL7
- Dialling code: 01367
- Police: Gloucestershire
- Fire: Gloucestershire
- Ambulance: South Western
- UK Parliament: North Cotswolds

Eastleach is a civil parish in the county of Gloucestershire, England. It was created in 1935 when the separate parishes of Eastleach Turville and Eastleach Martin were combined as the civil parish of Eastleach. The two villages of the parish—Eastleach Turville and Eastleach Martin—are separated only by the narrow River Leach, which is spanned by the stone road bridge and a stone slab clapper footbridge. Together the villages of Eastleach have over 60 listed houses and farm structures.

== Eastleach Martin ==
On the east bank of the Leach is Eastleach Martin, the smaller of the two villages. Today, the two principal structures are the church of St. Michael & St Martin, and Eastleach House, with a formal garden and extensive grounds open to the public. Eastleach Martin was also known as Bouthrop or Burthrop.

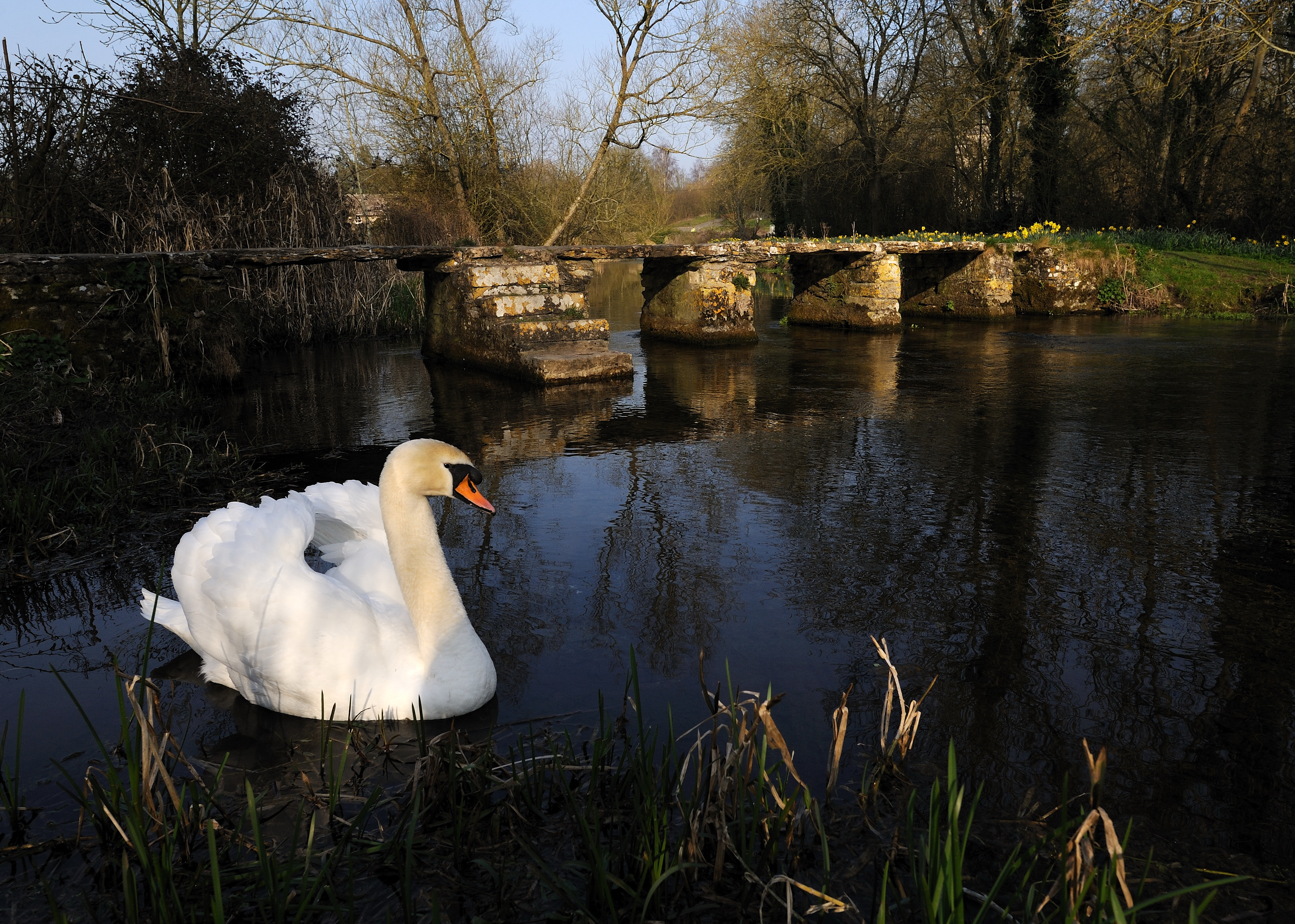
Keble clapper bridge across the River Leach

=== St. Michael & St. Martin ===
A Grade I listed structure, St. Michael & St. Martin is of early Norman in origin. Founded by Richard Fitz Pons, it was given to Great Malvern Priory in 1120, later passing to Gloucester Abbey. The present church is mostly 13th century; there are a Perpendicular font and some decorated Gothic windows terminating in tiny carved heads, but the interior is relatively plain. No longer used for worship, the church is maintained by the Churches Conservation Trust.

== Eastleach Turville ==
Eastleach Turville is the larger of the two villages today. The village hall, the parish church of St. Andrew, and the Victoria Inn all lie within Eastleach Turville.

=== St. Andrew ===
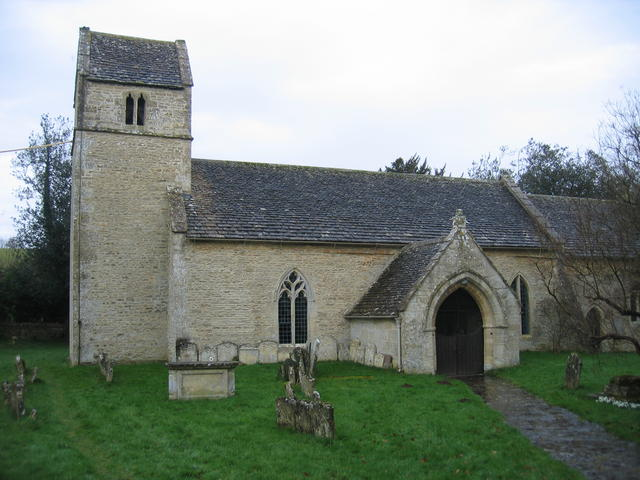
St Andrew, Eastleach Turville

Also a Grade I listed structure, St. Andrew sits directly across the Leach from St. Michael & St. Martin. Decoratively the more interesting of the two churches, St. Andrew's most prominent feature is the Christ in Majesty tympanum over the west door of the church. The interior of the church is also striking because of the spacious and beautiful Early English Period chancel. The lectern is said to have come from Tewkesbury Abbey. The 13th- or 14th-century tower of the mostly-Norman church has a simple gable roof known as a saddleback. St. Andrew remains a functioning parish church.

== Notable people ==
John Keble was curate of St. Michael & St. Martin, Eastleach Martin, in the early 19th century, where he founded a Sunday School; the clapper footbridge over the Leach is named after him. The priest and antiquary Peter Bailey Williams also served in Eastleach Martin, early in the 18th century.

The journalist, diplomat and intelligence agent, Jona von Ustinov, father of the actor Sir Peter Ustinov, died in Eastleach in 1962. His wife, the artist Nadia Benois also lived in the village. Some of her paintings depict local scenes.
