= Radcot Lock =

Coordinates: 51.69978°N 1.57241°W

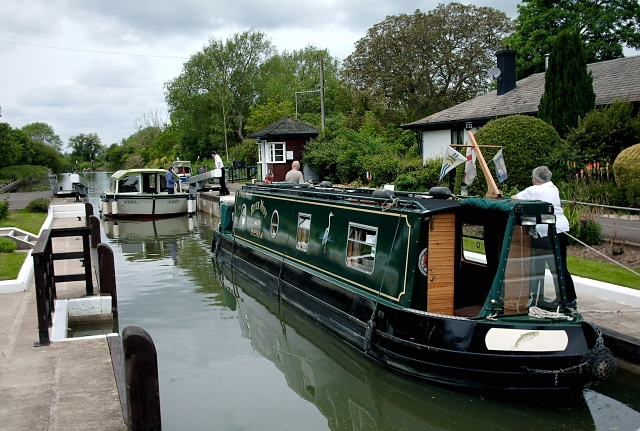
- Radcot Lock on the River Thames
- Interactive map of Radcot Lock
- Waterway: River Thames
- County: Oxfordshire
- Maintained by: Environment Agency
- Operation: Manual
- First built: 1892
- Length: 34.59 m (113 ft 6 in)
- Width: 4.57 m (15 ft 0 in)
- Fall: 1.48 m (4 ft 10 in)
- Above sea level: 221'
- Distance to Teddington Lock: 117 miles

Radcot Lock is a lock on the River Thames in England just downstream of Radcot, Oxfordshire, on the southern bank.

The lock was built by the Thames Conservancy in 1892 on the site of an old weir and flash lock.

The weir is on the other side of the lock island.

== History ==
There was previously a weir on the site known as Clarke's, although the names Becks or Bucks were also used. It was removed in 1868 and the river was widened then. Proposals for the new pound lock and weir were raised in 1891 and implemented the following year.

With the replacement of the historic paddle and rhymer weir(2013?) a combined fish and canoe pass was constructed, this currently (2018), is the only one of its type on the entire River Thames.

== Access to the lock ==
The lock can be reached on foot from the southern end of Radcot Bridge, or by road on a longer route, (about 1 mile) via Thrupp Turn. There is however no public vehicular access to the lock.

== Reach above the Lock ==
About halfway along is Radcot Bridge the oldest surviving bridge on the river. The bridge crossing the main channel has a single arch, and was constructed in stone in the late 18th century. The A4095 road which it carries also crosses a backwater, which was once the county boundary between Berkshire and Oxfordshire. The backwater bridge dates from the 13th and 14th centuries, and has three arches, the outer two being pointed, with the central one less so, as a result of later rebuilding. There is a considerable amount of mooring at the backwaters here. Stone for the rebuilding of St Paul's Cathedral, obtained from local quarries was loaded on rafts near the bridge.

Above Radcot is a sharp bend called "Hell's Turn" or "Hell Gut", and further on a point known as "Schoolmaster's Hole".

The Thames Path, which crosses the River at Radcot Bridge, follows the northern bank to Grafton Lock.

== See also ==
- Locks on the River Thames

| Next lock upstream | River Thames | Next lock downstream |
| Grafton Lock; 2.98 km (1.85 mi) | Radcot Lock; Grid reference: SP296001 | Rushey Lock; 4.23 km (2.63 mi) |
