= Halfpenny Bridge =

Bridge in Lechlade, England

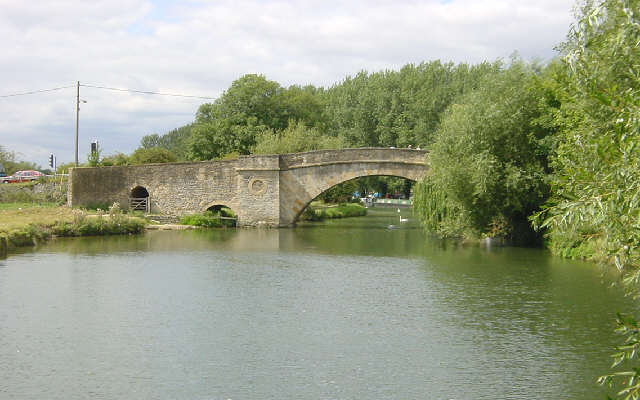
- Coordinates: 51.6924°N 1.6924°W
- Carries: A361 road
- Crosses: River Thames
- Locale: Lechlade

Characteristics
- Design: Arch
- Material: Stone
- Height: 15 ft 6 in (4.72 m)

History
- Designer: James Hollingsworth
- Opened: 1792

Location
- Interactive map of Halfpenny Bridge

Halfpenny Bridge is a bridge across the River Thames, at Lechlade, Gloucestershire, England. The bridge and its toll house are a Grade II listed building. It marks the start of the navigable Thames, although if the waters are high, the Thames can continue to be travelled by small and unpowered craft as far as Cricklade, over 10 miles (16 km) south-west.

The bow-backed bridge was built to a design of James Hollingworth in 1792. It carries the A361 from the south into Lechlade. It was called the Halfpenny bridge because that was the toll charged for pedestrians to cross it, until the toll was done away with in 1839.

The A361 is called Thames Street at this point, and the bridge was built when Thames Street was laid out. The structure is around 20 feet (6 m) wide and the single arch is nearly 26 feet (8 m) high to its apex. On the north bank of the river, a small square toll house is attached to the bridge on the downstream side. It consists of a basement and a room at road level, with a pyramidal asbestos slate roof. Both the bridge and the toll house are grade II listed. It is thought that a local firm of builders called Ralph and Crowdy were responsible for its construction. There is a separate arch in the south causeway, through which the towpath passes, and both parapets carry a central panel with a line on it, to mark the county boundary between Wiltshire and Gloucestershire.

In June 2023, a drunk-driver crashed into the eastern parapet causing substantial damage to the structure. The bridge is expected to remain closed to traffic for some months.

A local micro-brewery based in Lechlade, The Halfpenny Brewery, is named after the bridge.

== See also ==
- Crossings of the River Thames

Next crossing upstream	River Thames	Next crossing downstream
Footbridge at 51°41′18″N 1°42′16″W; Hannington Bridge (road)	Halfpenny Bridge	St John's Bridge (road)
