= River Leach =

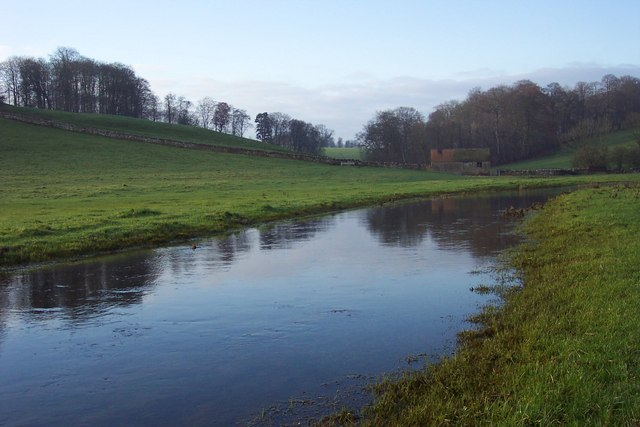
- Upper Leach near Eastleach Turville

Location
- Country: England
- Counties: Gloucestershire, Oxfordshire
- Towns: Northleach, Lechlade

Physical characteristics
- Source: Hampnett
  - location: Gloucestershire, Cotswolds
  - coordinates: 51°41′N 1°38′W
- Mouth: River Thames
  - location: Lechlade
  - coordinates: 51°41′21″N 1°40′38″W
- Length: 29 km (18 mi)
- Discharge
  - location: Priory Mill Lechlade
  - average: 0.75 m^{3}/s (26 cu ft/s)
  - minimum: 0.01 m^{3}/s (0.35 cu ft/s)25 September 1990

The River Leach is a river and upper tributary to the Thames, in England which runs almost entirely in Gloucestershire. It is approximately 18 miles (29 km) long, springing from the limestone uplands of the Cotswolds. In parts it becomes a seasonal bourn, an old concept, meaning only running above ground when there is sufficient rainfall. Despite its small size it gives its name to two towns and a pair of villages.

== Sources ==
The source of the Leach is in the village of Hampnett, about ten miles east of Cheltenham just south of the A40 road. The source spring is enclosed by stonework and pours from a pipe. It seems likely that this spring in a sheltered valley on the Cotswold uplands was the original reason for the existence of the village of Hampnett. According to residents, this section runs all year round.

== Early stream ==
After running a mile down its limestone valley, the Leach reaches Northleach, the first settlement to which it gives its name. The river enters Northleach to the south west, where it gushes out of a Victorian conduit just below the Fosse Way. At this point it is also known as the Seven Springs. The site of the first watermill on the river is in a part of Northleach called Mill End. A section of the river is confined into mill race type stonework, close to the churchyard and runs behind houses marking the town boundary. The river can next be seen at a road bridge at the end of the town. It is still little more than ditch-sized, and as such continues down the valley to the hamlet of Eastington running alongside a lane before passing through a culvert and away through grazing land.

== Seasonal bourn ==
The river runs behind Lodge Park, a National Trust property, and through Larkethill Wood, where it flows under another lane, before passing Kilkenny Farm. The Leach valley shows as a substantial dip in the B4425 Cirencester-Burford road. The river has an embankment at the bottom of the valley, but has not increased in size. Through all this section the river is often nearly invisible under summer vegetation. It then passes Swyre Farm with another road crossing, then Dean Farm, before reaching a very picturesque winding valley, crossed by the Westwell-Hatherop road. This section is notably a bourn in an unremarkable depression, that is, it normally runs in the winter, but often below the surface or dry in part of the summer. The bourn section is usually running continuously long enough to have the appearance of a river, with a scoured bed and water plants.)

== River ==
Between this road crossing and the paired villages of Eastleach Martin and Eastleach Turville is the point at which the bourn becomes an all-year river. Here it is crossed by a stone slab clapper bridge on a footpath close to a wide marshy area. A small spring rises close to the bridge. By the time the river passes between the Eastleach villages, each with their parish churches just a few hundred yards apart, the Leach has become a "proper" river, several yards (metres) wide. Between the villages a road bridge and another "clapper" footbridge cross the river. It passes another old mill between the Eastleaches and Southrop (pronounced "Suth-er-op") then skirts the hamlet of Fyfield. At the bridge at Southrop it divides into several channels, making a very attractive effect. From Southrop, the Leach forms the border between Gloucestershire and Oxfordshire.

== Final section and confluence ==
There are three large watermills (none working) on the river in fairly quick succession, firstly at Little Faringdon close to Lechlade the second town named after the river, then at Lechlade Mill, and finally Priory Mill which is situated on the Kelmscott road. A few hundred yards (metres) later the Leach discharges from the northern bank into the Thames on the reach above Buscot Lock. It joins at the corner of the camping field behind The Trout Inn.

== Water quality ==
The Environment Agency measure water quality of the river systems in England. Each is given an overall ecological status, which may be one of five levels: high, good, moderate, poor and bad. There are several components that are used to determine this, including biological status, which looks at the quantity and varieties of invertebrates, angiosperms and fish. Chemical status, which compares the concentrations of various chemicals against known safe concentrations, is rated good or fail.

Water quality of the River Leach in 2019:

Section	Ecological Status	Chemical Status	Overall Status	Length	Catchment	Channel
Leach (Source to Thames)	Poor	Fail	Poor	30.734 km (19.097 mi)	77.748 km^{2} (30.019 sq mi)	

== See also ==
- Tributaries of the River Thames
- List of rivers in England

Next confluence upstream	River Thames	Next confluence downstream
River Coln (north) with Thames and Severn Canal	River Leach	River Cole (south)
