= Lechlade Priory =

Monastery in Lechlade, Gloucestershire, England

Coordinates: 51°41′25″N 1°40′42″W

Lechlade Priory was a house of Augustinian Canons Regular in Lechlade, Gloucestershire, England.

The priory, also called the Lechlade hospital (hospitalry), was founded in the 13th century by Isabella de Mortimer, initially as a nunnery; in 1252 Richard, 1st Earl of Cornwall became its patron. The priory had seven priests, however on various occasions they were criticised for not carrying out their duties and diverting the charitable monies which were meant to be used for the poor and sick. The priory survived until its dissolution in 1472.

The priory during its existence maintained St. John's bridge which was built (or more accurately commissioned) by those who founded Lechlade priory, on the line of an old ford of the River Thames. It is known the prior was bestowed grants of pontage in 1338, 1341, and 1388. The building which is now the Trout Inn acted as a hospital or almshouse, dedicated to St. John the Baptist, and formed part of the priory. The hospital had the mandate of caring for workmen on the bridge.

Apart from a section of the Trout Inn all other buildings which made up the priory have now collapsed or been demolished. Part of the site is now a mobile home and caravan park.
