= St John's Bridge, Lechlade =

St John's Bridge
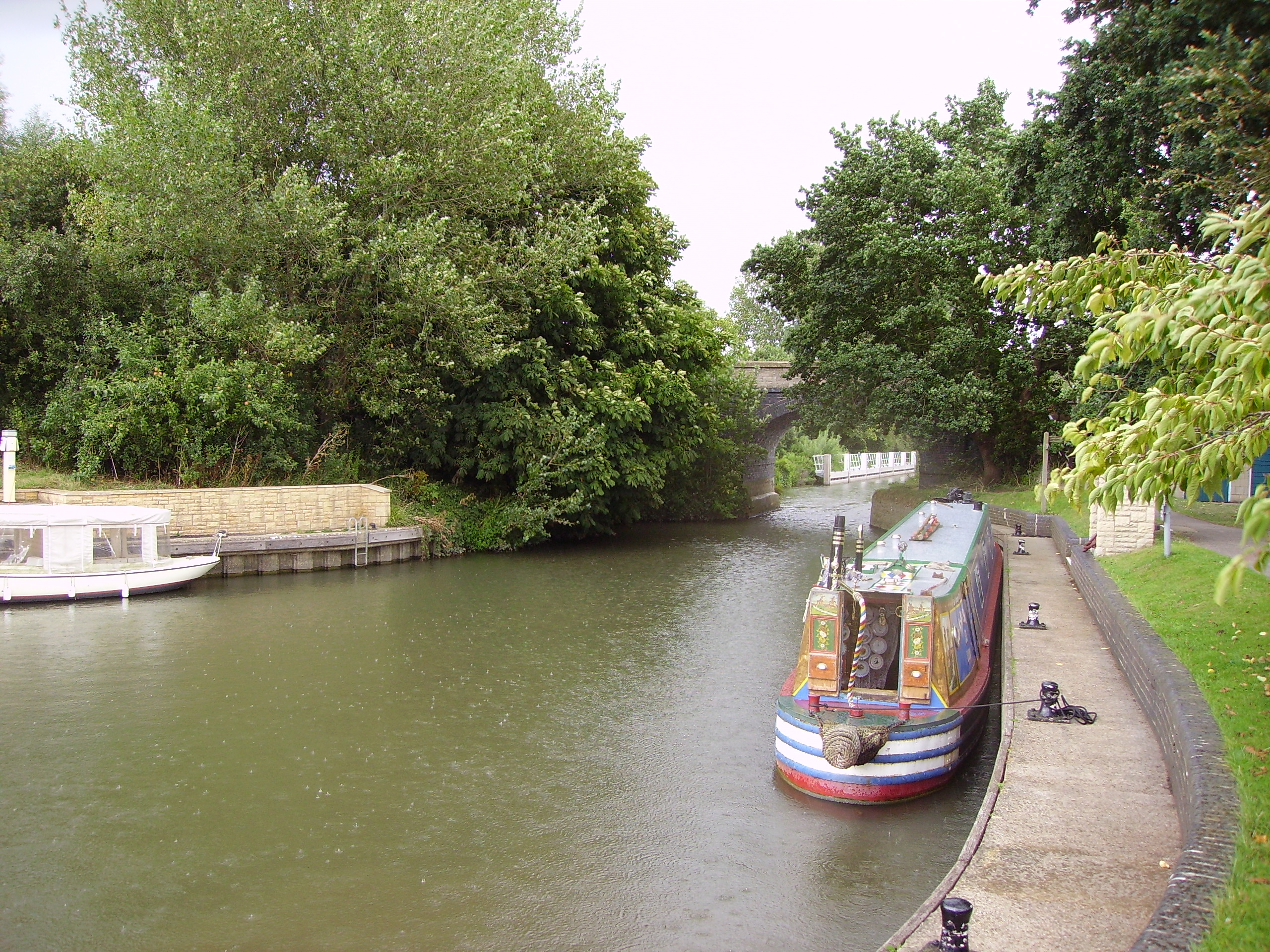
- The right-channel arch of St. John's Bridge (also known as lock cut arch)
- Coordinates: 51.689676°N 1.678873°W
- Carries: A417 road
- Crosses: River Thames
- Locale: Lechlade
- Maintained by: Gloucestershire County Council

Characteristics
- Material: Brick
- Height: 13 ft 10 in (4.22 m)
- No. of spans: 2
- Piers in water: none

History
- Opened: 1886, first opened 1229

Statistics
- Toll: abolished

Location
- Interactive map of St John's Bridge

St John's Bridge is a two-section road bridge across the channel of the upper Thames near Lechlade, England, then across the lock cut to the south, the highest lock on the Thames. It is a Grade II listed building.

== Purpose ==
It carries the A417 road between Lechlade and Faringdon.

== Landmarks ==
It crosses the channels, specifically considered from north to south, at points 10 m above the weir and then 50 m below St John's Lock. Its weir pool is next to the beer garden/lawn of The Trout Inn and is used for mooring of pleasure cruisers and smaller motor boats.

St John's Bridge Island, a natural long thin river island partially straightened for the building of the lock, supports the viaduct mid-section of the bridge. The parish boundaries for centuries have been approximately the lock's middle then immediately at the bridge a tiny dog-leg into the right bank, return to the cut for a distance, then a quarter turn to assume the midpoint of left channel – it is a mystery as to the exact shape of the island during the Middle Ages and before; however many former fords cross river islands. The island measures 1.208 acres (0.489 ha) and was divided into four land ownership or use parcels in the 1890s.

== History ==
The present bridge was built in 1886. The original was built (or more accurately commissioned) by those who founded a new priory, Lechlade Priory the year before nearby, in 1229 on the line of an old ford. A documented ancient right of taking toll from barges passing under the bridge, with which went the duty of penning back the water to create a 'flash' to enable them to pass, was later claimed by the lords of Lechlade manor as owners of the hospital estate.

The Lechlade hospital (hospitalry) also recorded as priory during its existence maintained St. John's bridge; it is known the prior was bestowed grants of pontage in 1338, 1341, and 1388. Later the bridge comprised two large and two small arches and there was a causeway of more than 20 arches across the south meadows. A gateway to the bridge was built by Peter FitzHerbert in 1228 later converted to a larger building known as "Noah's Ark" in 1716. By 1831 the bridge was dilapidated and an inconclusive dispute over the liability to repair it arose between the county and the occupiers of the former hospital (priory) lands. The county later accepted responsibility, employing a local builder, Peter Cox, to rebuild the bridge as a single arch. In the late 17th century and early 18th the right to take toll was disputed by the bargemen and in the time of Sir Thomas Cutler led on one occasion to the arches being chained over. In 1791 the difficulties of passing the main bridge were avoided when the navigation commissioners for the upper Thames by-passed it with a deepened cut to the immediate south of the old bridge suitable for barges in which they built a lock. The Thames and Severn Canal from Stroud to Lechlade was opened in 1789, the junction with the Thames being 1 km. southwest of the town where a watchman's house was built. Long-distance river traffic had fallen and the canal was closed in 1927.

== See also ==
- St John's Lock
- Crossings of the River Thames

Next bridge upstream	River Thames	Next bridge downstream
Halfpenny Bridge	St John's Bridge; Grid reference SU2229699037	Bloomers Hole Footbridge
