= River Cole, Wiltshire =

River in Wiltshire and Gloucestershire, England

River Cole
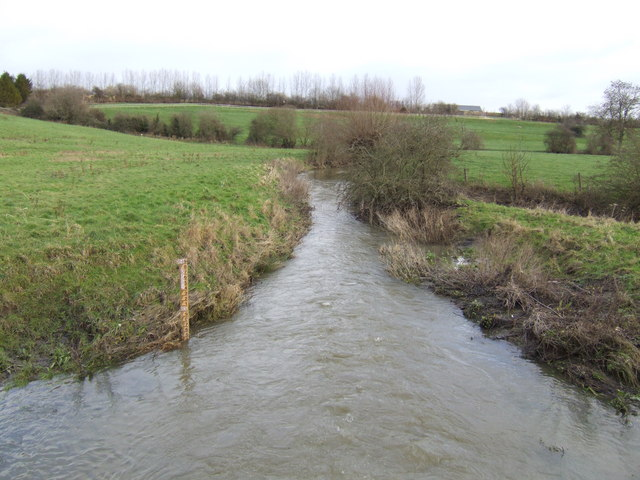
- Cole near Sevenhampton

Location
- Country: England
- Counties: Wiltshire, Oxfordshire
- Towns: Swindon

Physical characteristics
- Source
  - location: Swindon, Wiltshire
  - coordinates: 51.5726°N 1.7252°W
- Mouth: River Thames
  - location: Above Buscot Lock, Oxfordshire
  - coordinates: 51°41′19″N 1°40′37″W
- Length: 27 km (17 mi)

The River Cole is a tributary of the River Thames in England which flows through Wiltshire and Oxfordshire, forming part of the border between the two counties.

== Course ==
The river rises in Swindon, east of the town centre in the Walcot area. Much of its upper course has been culverted and built over; it can be seen east of the Greenbridge retail park, which it flows through in a northeasterly direction. From there it is culverted, across to Slade Drive where it turns southeast for about three quarters of a mile. At the Piccadilly roundabout it turns abruptly east and skirts the Coleview Estate. It flows east past Covingham and under Merlin Way, through a flood marsh before passing under the A419 road. It runs to the east of the town through Stratton St Margaret, South Marston and Coleshill, Oxfordshire. It joins the Thames near Lechlade from the southern bank near the A417 bridge on the reach above Buscot Lock. The river flows in part through National Trust land, with many mills adjacent to the river that have altered it by straightening and pollution.

== Restoration ==
The river had become polluted and underwent restoration in the 1990s near Coleshill, by allowing it to flow on its natural course and by redeveloping the river bed. This was intended to help increase the biodiversity of the area and of the river itself. The restoration measures included raising the river bed to create natural flood meadows and floodplains, and putting in meanders to recreate a natural environment. This should also help the local population as the flood risk will decrease as a result of allowing flooding further upstream and in fields adjacent to the river. The restoration works were carried out in 1995 by the River Restoration Project as one of three EU-LIFE demonstration projects. The River Restoration Centre (previously known as the River Restoration Project) hold reports and documents detailing the restoration of the Cole.

== Flooding ==
In the heavy rains of late July 2007 the Cole burst its banks and flooded the Covingham area of Swindon and Covingham Drive immediately to the south of the river. Extensive remedial works were carried out to reduce the risk of future flooding.

== See also ==
- Tributaries of the River Thames
- List of rivers in England

Next confluence upstream	River Thames	Next confluence downstream
River Leach (north)	River Cole, Wiltshire	River Windrush (north)
