= Father Thames =

Personification of the River Thames

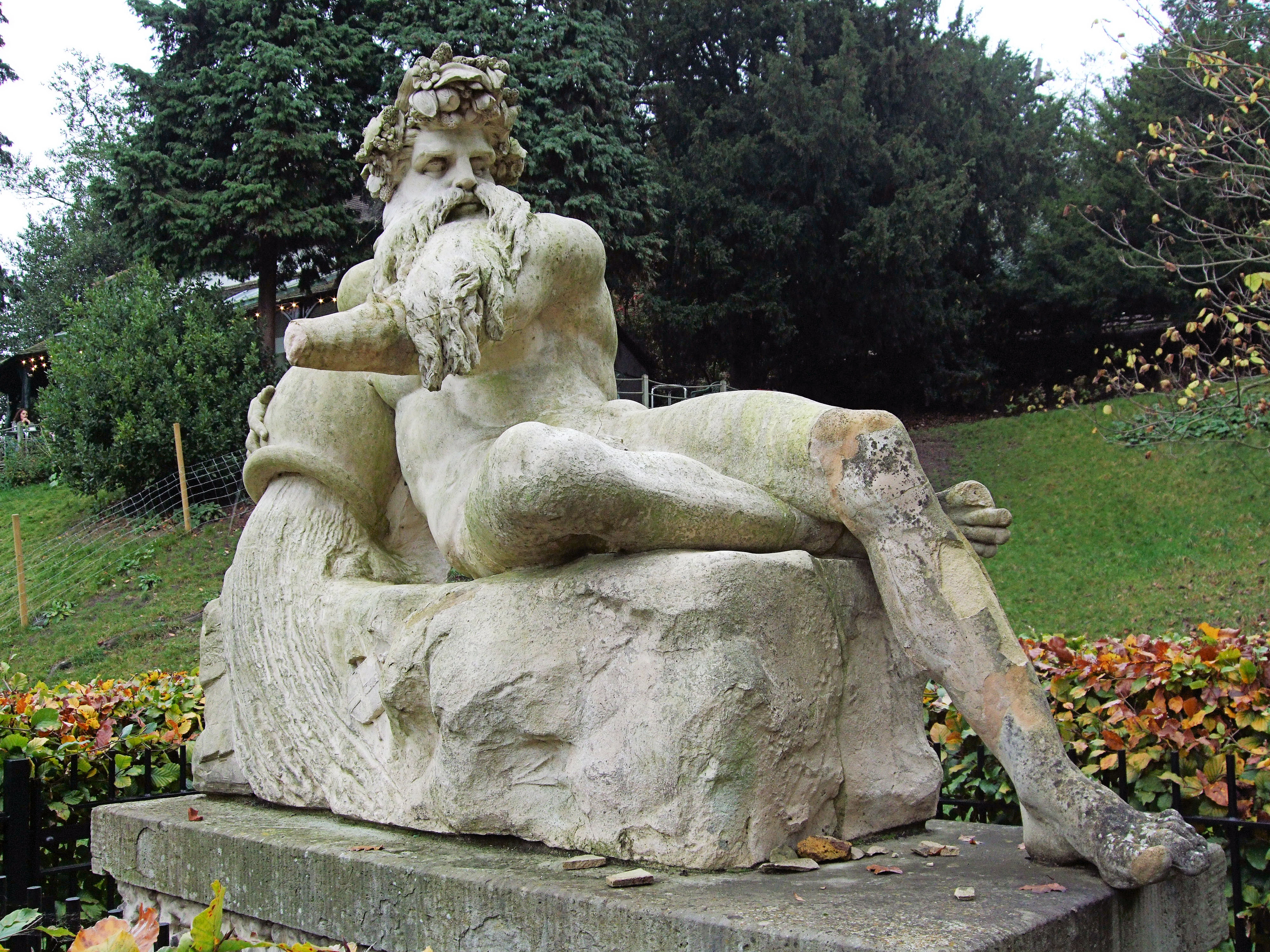
Coade stone sculpture Old Father Thames by John Bacon in Terrace Gardens, Richmond. One of two remaining, with the other at Ham House

Father Thames or Old Father Thames is a personification of the River Thames in English folklore. There had existed multiple deities associated with the Thames previously, and while his origins are obscure, starting in the 18th century the depiction of Father Thames with his commonly accepted characteristics and appearance began. His likeness has been rendered in artwork and his name used as a poetic or literary description of the Thames.

Due to the river's Roman association with the goddess Isis of Egyptian and later Roman mythology, the upper portion of the Thames has sometimes been given a feminine identity, with William Morris describing the calm upper reaches as "this far off, lonely mother of the Thames". At Seven Springs, a traditionally ascribed source of the Thames, his name is invoked with an inscription reading, in Latin, "Here, O Father Thames, is your sevenfold source".

His flowing beard and hair are features commonly associated with water in mythology, and he is often depicted alongside an urn or "Horn of Plenty" (cornucopia). It is traditionally said to have been created from the horn of Achelous, an Ancient Greek river god who lost it fighting Heracles while in the form of a bull. The association with the cornucopia also a represents the river as a fruitful force when well managed and utilised.

== Depictions ==
Father Thames has frequently been depicted in art, particularly in the form of sculpture around London and the Thames Valley. Old Father Thames by John Bacon was a set of casts in Coade stone with two known surviving examples, one in Richmond Terrace Gardens and one at Ham House. In a similar bronze rendition by John Bacon in Somerset House, Father Thames is likened to Neptune. Another statue of Father Thames made by Raffaelle Monti sits at St John's Lock, the site of one of the first locks built on the river – it was originally placed at Thames Head. In this sculpture he is depicted alongside bales and barrels to represent the use of the river in transport of goods, and holds a spade in reference to the industry required to maintain the river as a working waterway. 10 Trinity Square, the former headquarters of the Port of London Authority also has a statue of Father Thames, acting as a genius loci, he stands holding a trident and pointing out towards sea. Other depictions of Father Thames adorn the Hammersmith Town Hall as well as Vauxhall Bridge and Kew Bridge.

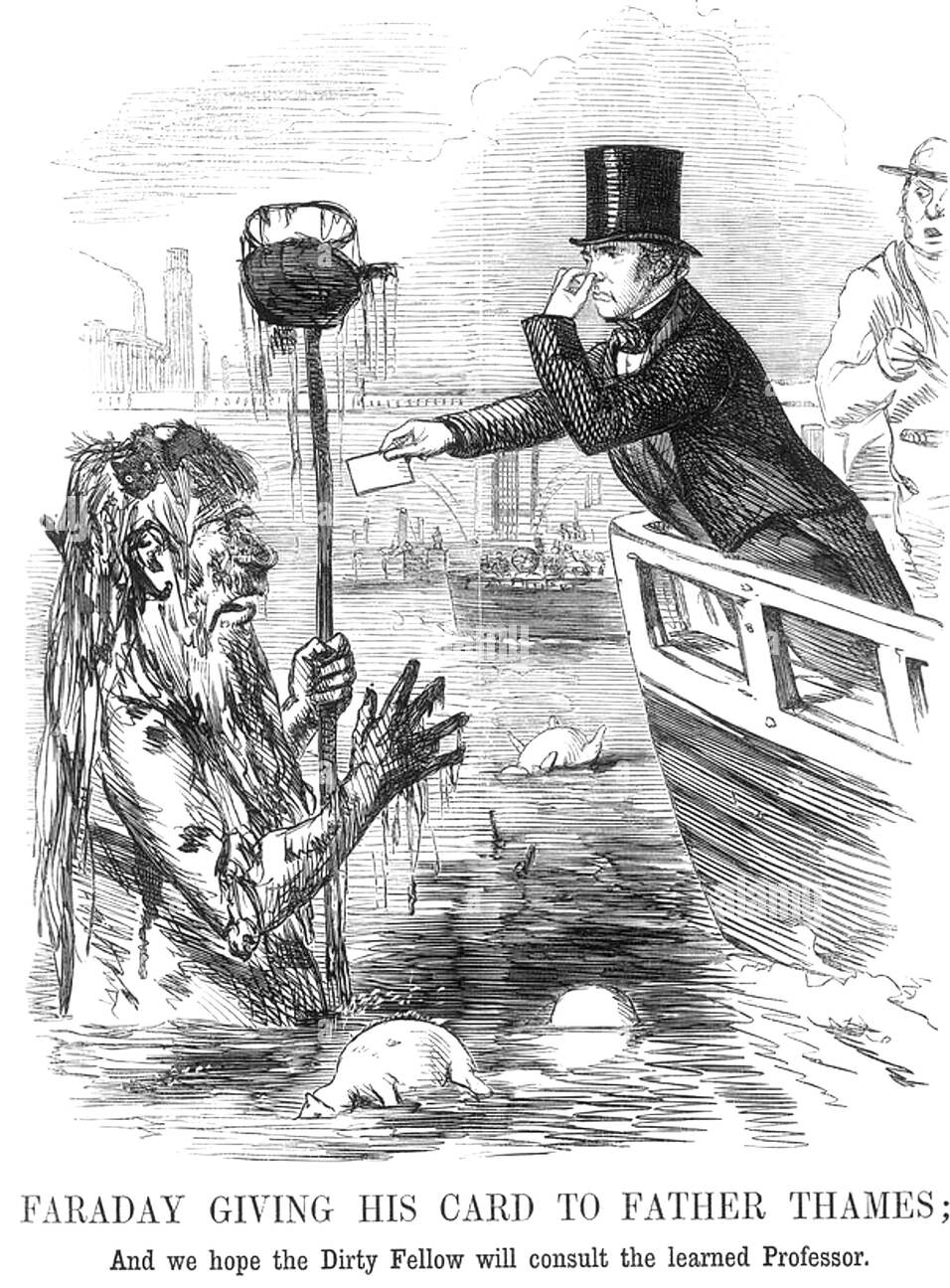
"Faraday giving his card to Father Thames", caricature in Punch, 1855

Reference to Father Thames or Old Father Thames in literature perhaps predates his physical personification. John Denham in his poem Cooper's Hill hints at a deistic interpretation of the Thames as early as 1642. John Dryden who gave comment praising the sweetness of Denham's lines would, in Annus Mirabilis, write explicitly of Old Father Thames in relation to the Great Fire of London. Alexander Pope in Windsor-Forest similarly named Old Father Thames.

The Rivers of London series by Ben Aaronovitch features Father Thames as a recurring character. In a reverse of William Morris' interpretation, he represents the non-tidal reaches beyond Teddington Lock. The tidal portion of the river is personified by Mama Thames with various tributaries depicted as their children.

During the Great Stink in 1858, Father Thames was often the subject of satirical cartoons such as those seen in Punch where he was shown as a dirty or putrescent figure. 'Old Father Thames (Keeps Rolling Along)' is also the title of a song by Huntley Trevor and Lawrence Right with recordings made by Jack Hylton, Peter Dawson, and Gracie Fields among others.
