= Radcot Bridge =

Grade I listed bridge in Grafton and Radcot, Oxfordshire, England

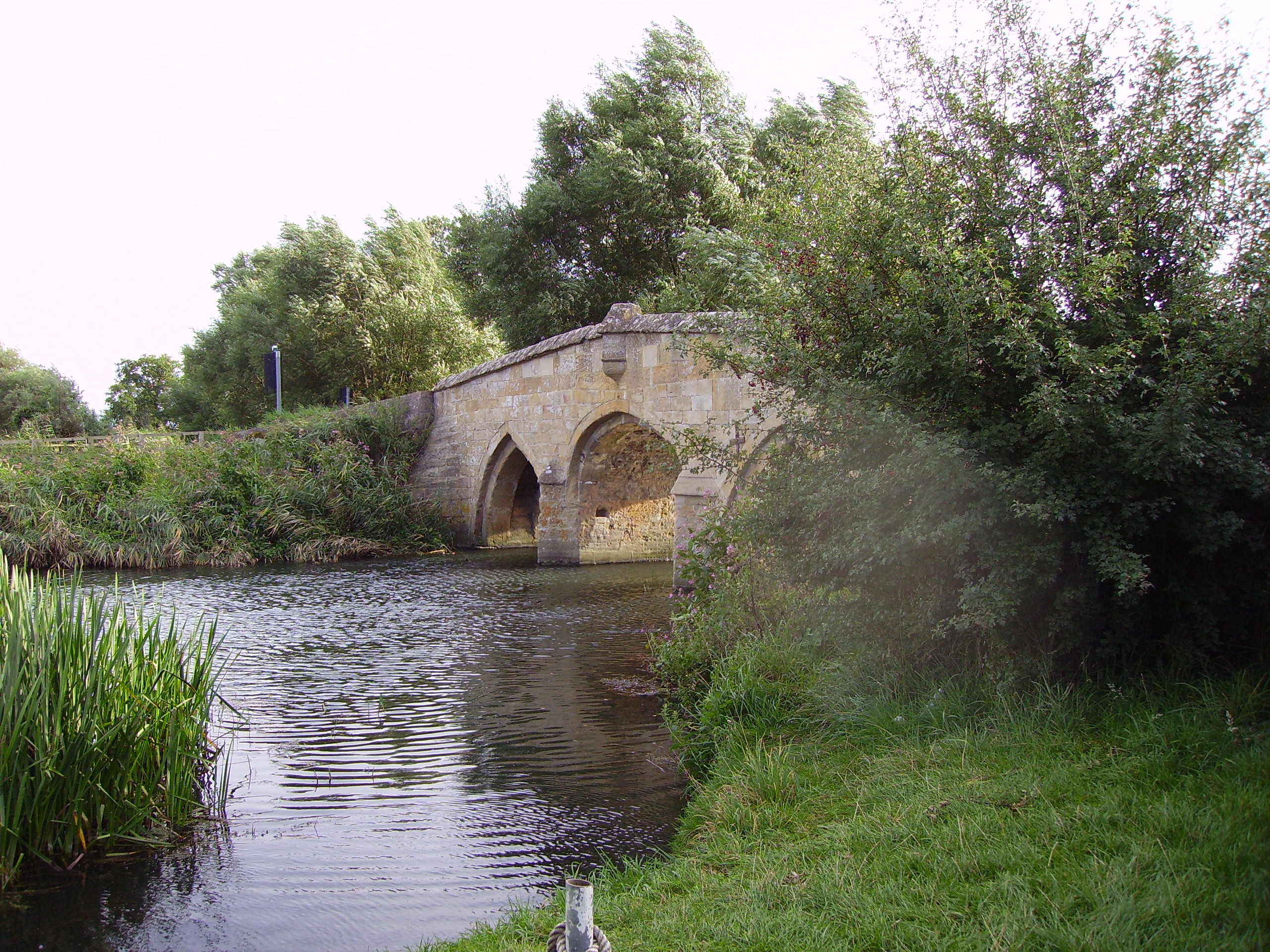
- Radcot Bridge
- Coordinates: 51.693081°N 1.588644°W
- Carries: A4095 road, Thames Path
- Crosses: River Thames
- Locale: Radcot, Oxfordshire
- Maintained by: Oxfordshire County Council
- Heritage status: Grade I listed

Characteristics
- Design: arch
- Material: Stone
- Height: 11 feet 4 inches (3.45 m)
- Load limit: 18 tonnes (18 long tons; 20 short tons)

History
- Opened: circa 1200

Location
- Interactive map of Radcot Bridge

Radcot Bridge is a crossing of the River Thames, south of Radcot and north of Faringdon, in the Vale of White Horse district of Oxfordshire (formerly part of Berkshire) in England. It carries the A4095 road across the reach above Radcot Lock. In many analyses it is a series of three bridges – before the northern one is reached, mainly to the east, is the smaller island hosting the Swan Inn. On the main north bank are slight earthworks forming a large square in which further remains have been found of Matilda's Castle and some Roman artefacts.

== The bridges ==
Three stone bridges cross this part of the upper Thames valley: from south to north, these are: Old Radcot Bridge, the Canal Bridge (listed as part of Radcot Bridge) and Pidnell Bridge which is close to the main building on the smaller island, 'Ye Olde Swan' Hotel. The latter is confusingly furthest from Pidnell Farm – the nearest farmstead or hamlet in Faringdon parish.

Originally built across the Thames, Old Radcot Bridge now crosses only about a third of the local river flow since the construction, in 1787, of a new cut for the Thames and Severn Canal. The Canal Bridge was built at the same time. Radcot Bridge is the oldest standing bridge on the Thames, the core having been built, with pointed arches of Taynton stone, around 1200. The Cistercian monks of Saint Mary at Cîteaux in Normandy were granted land for the purpose by King John.

The larger island which is crossed has a rectangular cottage (named after the bridge) with one side almost against the road, and which is a listed building.; on the other side of the road is pillbox from World War II, part of the GHQ Line.

Much of the structure was torn down during the Battle of Radcot Bridge on 19 December 1387 between troops loyal to Richard II, led by court favourite Robert de Vere, and an army captained by Richard's cousin Henry Bolingbroke, Earl of Derby – the future Henry IV. The bridge was rebuilt in 1393. It was severely damaged during the latter part of the Wars of the Roses, and was largely rebuilt as it appears today, with a flattened centre arch.

Radcot Bridge became a toll bridge and its wharf was commercially important as the highest shipping point on the Thames, with the junction of the Severn-Thames canal not far away at Lechlade, Gloucestershire. During this era of the Industrial Revolution in the United Kingdom the local towpath would also have become heavily worn year-round for the first time.

The longer Thames Path, variants of which were first made in the 19th century, crosses the bridges.

== Matilda's Castle ==
Time Team, in a programme first broadcast on 15 February 2009, excavated Matilda's Castle in the summer of 2008. They found that visible earthworks near Radcot Bridge dated from the 17th-century English Civil War, when Parliamentary forces built them to support cannon used to bombard Royalist forces garrisoned in Radcot House. Underneath some of these earthworks were remains of a square Norman keep dating from the time of the 12th-century Anarchy. Evidence suggested the tower was pulled down a century after it was built. Its remains were further damaged by later constructions on the site. Some Roman remains, possibly from a villa, were also found.

== See also ==
- Crossings of the River Thames

== Notes and references ==
=== Citations ===
Next bridge upstream	River Thames	Next bridge downstream
Eaton Footbridge (pedestrian)	Radcot Bridge; Grid reference SU2856399401	Old Man's Bridge (pedestrian)
Next bridge upstream	Thames Path	Next bridge downstream
northern bank Bloomers Hole Footbridge	Radcot Bridge; Grid reference SU2856399401	southern bank Tadpole Bridge
