= Lechlade =

Town in Gloucestershire, England

Coordinates: 51.699°N 1.692°W

- Town
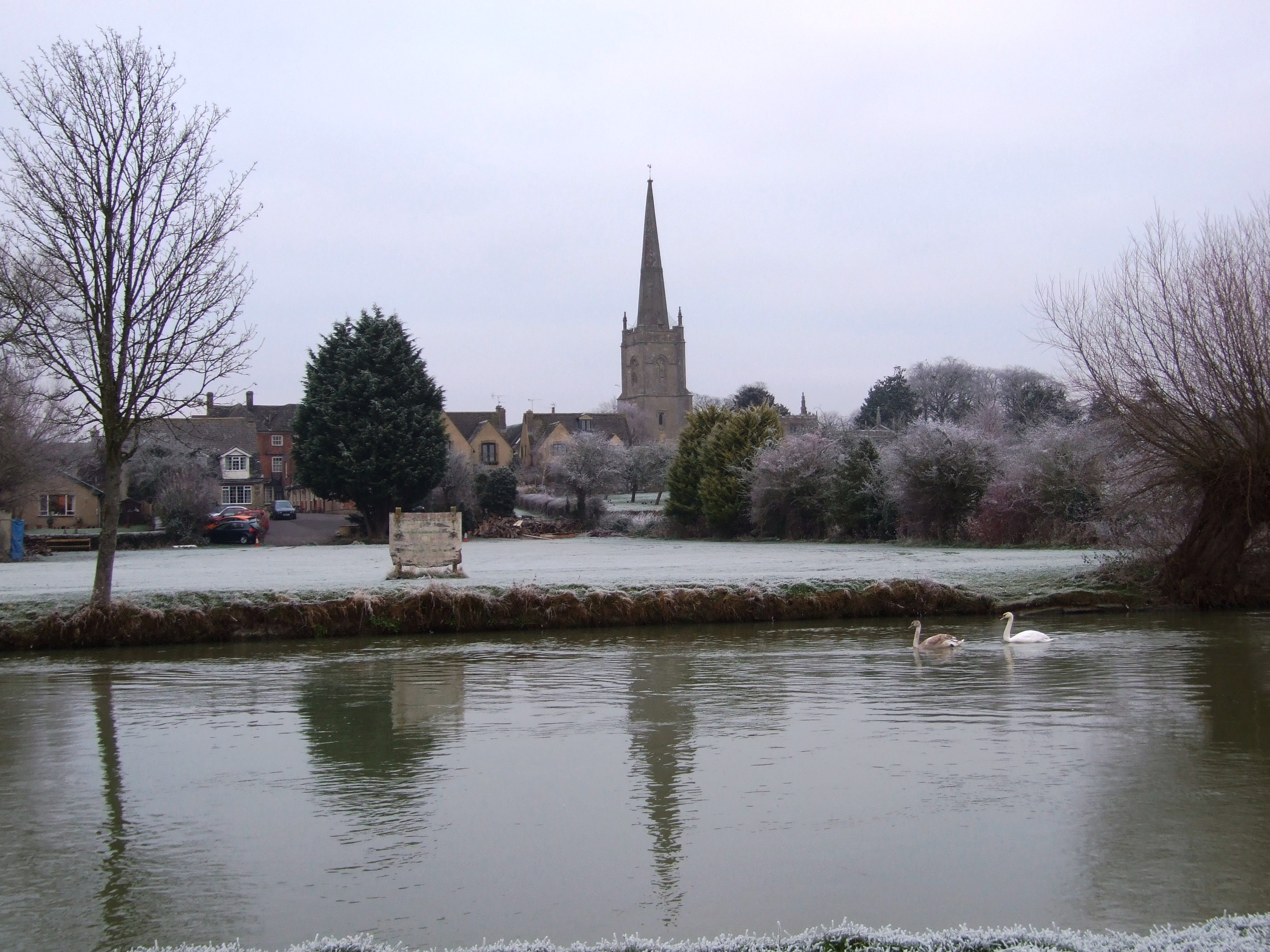
- St Lawrence's seen across the Thames

- Location within Gloucestershire
- Population: 3,139 (2021 Census)
- OS grid reference: SU2199
- District: Cotswold
- Shire county: Gloucestershire
- Region: South West
- Country: England
- Sovereign state: United Kingdom
- Post town: Lechlade
- Postcode district: GL7
- Dialling code: 01367
- Police: Gloucestershire
- Fire: Gloucestershire
- Ambulance: South Western
- UK Parliament: South Cotswolds
- Website: Lechlade-on-Thames official website

Lechlade (/ˈlɛtʃleɪd/) is a town at the edge of the Cotswolds in Gloucestershire, England, 55 miles (89 km) south of Birmingham and 68 miles (109 km) west of London. It is the highest point at which the River Thames is navigable, although there is a right of navigation that continues south-west into Cricklade, in the neighbouring county of Wiltshire. The town is named after the River Leach that joins the Thames near The Trout Inn and St. John's Bridge.

The low-lying land is alluvium, Oxford Clay and river gravels and the town is surrounded by lakes created from disused gravel extraction sites, forming parts of the Cotswold Water Park; several have now been designated as Sites of Special Scientific Interest and nature reserves. Human occupation dates from the Neolithic, Iron Age and Roman periods and it developed as a trading centre served by river, canal, roads and railway, although the station closed in 1962.

The Anglican Church of St Lawrence is a Grade I listed building dating from the 15th century. The development of the nearby RAF Fairford and RAF Brize Norton after World War II contributed to the expansion of the town.

== Etymology ==
According to the University of Nottingham’s Survey of English Place-Names, “Lechlade” is usually interpreted as referring to a passage across the River Thames near its confluence with the River Leach, but is more likely to mean “a water-course of the Leach”, i.e. some alternative water-channel of the Leach, such as a mill-stream:

The present course of the R. Leach from north of Lechlade Mill to St John's Bridge may be the channel in question, for a second and now minor water-course runs from the former point to join the Thames 1½ miles further east of St John's Bridge and is in fact the county boundary.

== History ==
A Neolithic cursus was discovered from cropmarks on aerial photographs was identified in 1943. There are several archaeological remains of dwellings from the Iron Age and Roman periods, which have now been scheduled as an ancient monument.

William the Conqueror gave the manor of Lechlade to Henry de Ferrers, who had accompanied him to England in 1066, and the manor is mentioned in the Domesday Book. A charter granting market to the town was passed in 1210. Lechlade Priory was founded in the early 13th century and lasted until 1472. The town developed as a trading centre linked by the river, canal, roads and railway. The town's railway station opened in 1873 and closed in 1962. The development of RAF Fairford and RAF Brize Norton following World War II increased local employment and the need for housing.

== Governance ==
Lechlade falls in the Kempsford–Lechlade electoral ward. This ward stretches from Lechlade in the east to Kempsford in the west. The total population of this ward taken from the 2011 census was 3,973.

Although in Gloucestershire, and traditionally in the hundred of Brightwells Barrow, from 1894 till 1935 the town was administered as part of Faringdon Rural District in Berkshire. From 1935 till 1974 it was part of Cirencester Rural District in Gloucestershire, and since 1974 it has been a part of Cotswold District.

The town is part of the South Cotswolds parliamentary constituency represented in the House of Commons of the UK Parliament, since its creation in July 2024, by Roz Savage, a Liberal Democrat.

== Geography ==
The geology of the area consists of Alluvium, Oxford Clay and river gravels. The land is generally fairly flat and low lying. It is surrounded by lakes created from disused gravel extraction sites, forming parts of the Cotswold Water Park and several have now been designated as Sites of Special Scientific Interest and nature reserves. The Edward Richardson & Phyllis Amey nature reserve consists of marsh and reedbeds which attract dragonflies and birds such as grey heron and great crested grebe. At Roundhouse Lake common visitors are Eurasian wigeon, red-crested pochard, common goldeneye, common pochard and tufted duck.

== The River Thames ==
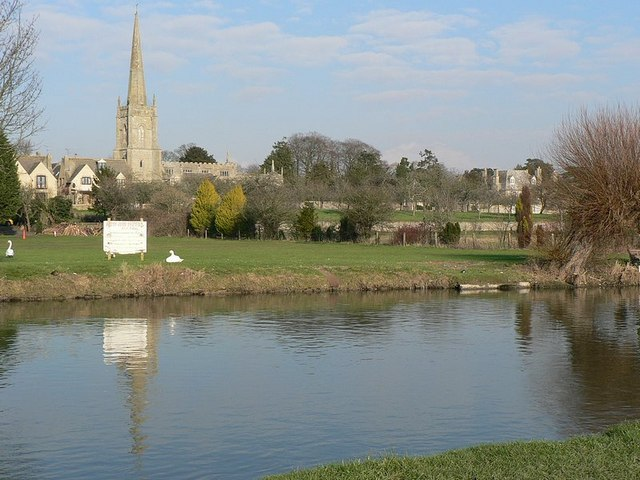
River Thames and Lechlade

Lechlade is the highest town to which the River Thames is navigable by relatively large craft including narrowboats. It is possible to travel by river or walk the Thames Path from here to London. In the early eighteenth century goods unloaded in Bristol were transported to Gloucester, carried overland to Lechlade and sent down the Thames to London. The Halfpenny Bridge is therefore the usual start for a water based Thames meander – the term for a long-distance journey down the Thames. The Thames Path also continues upstream to the traditional source of the Thames at Thames Head. The river is actually navigable for a short distance further upstream, near the village of Inglesham, where the Thames and Severn Canal joins the River Thames. Rowing boats can reach even further upstream, to Cricklade. Lechlade is a popular resort for Thames boating. Boats of different types can be hired from here, from rowing boats to river cruisers.

The highest lock on the Thames is St John's Lock, at Lechlade, overlooked by a statue of Old Father Thames. There is a view from St John's Bridge across the lock and the meadows to the spire of St Lawrence's parish church. The River Leach flows into the Thames at St John's Bridge. The poet Percy Bysshe Shelley composed A Summer Evening Churchyard here which includes the lines

Clothing in hues of heaven thy dim and distant spire

Around whose lessening and invisible height

Gather among the stars the clouds of night

== Economy ==
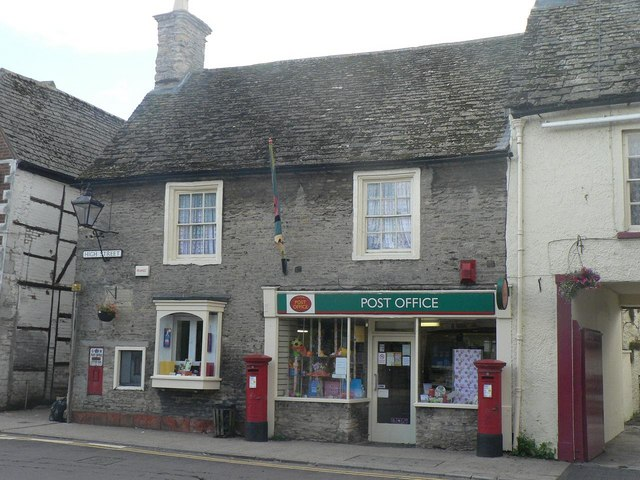
The Post Office

The town is a popular venue for tourism and river-based activities.

There are several pubs, some antique shops, a convenience store, food outlets, a garden centre and a Christmas shop.

== Culture and community ==
Lechlade has hosted a music festival since 2011. In 2015 the festival's headline act was Status Quo. The festival was cancelled in 2023 due to poor weather causing the ground to be too soft, which resulted in the Lechlade Festival company going into liquidation.

Lechlade has a number of youth activities, most of them centred on the Memorial Hall and the adjacent Lechlade Pavilion Hall. Behind the Town Hall are large playing fields, an astro turf pitch, a skate park and a playground. The memorial hall was rebuilt after a fire in 2016.

1970 Squadron Air Training Corps was founded in the town in 1997. The squadron's membership consisted of young people from Lechlade and neighbouring towns such as Fairford and Faringdon. The unit has disbanded and all cadets transferred, many attending the group in Highworth. The 1st Lechlade Scout Group can trace its origins back to 1915 when Robert Baden-Powell inspected Scouts from Lechlade and the surrounding area.

== Landmarks ==
Lechlade Manor, north east of the town centre, was built in a Jacobean style in 1872. During World War II it became the Catholic Convent of St Clotilde.

== Transport ==
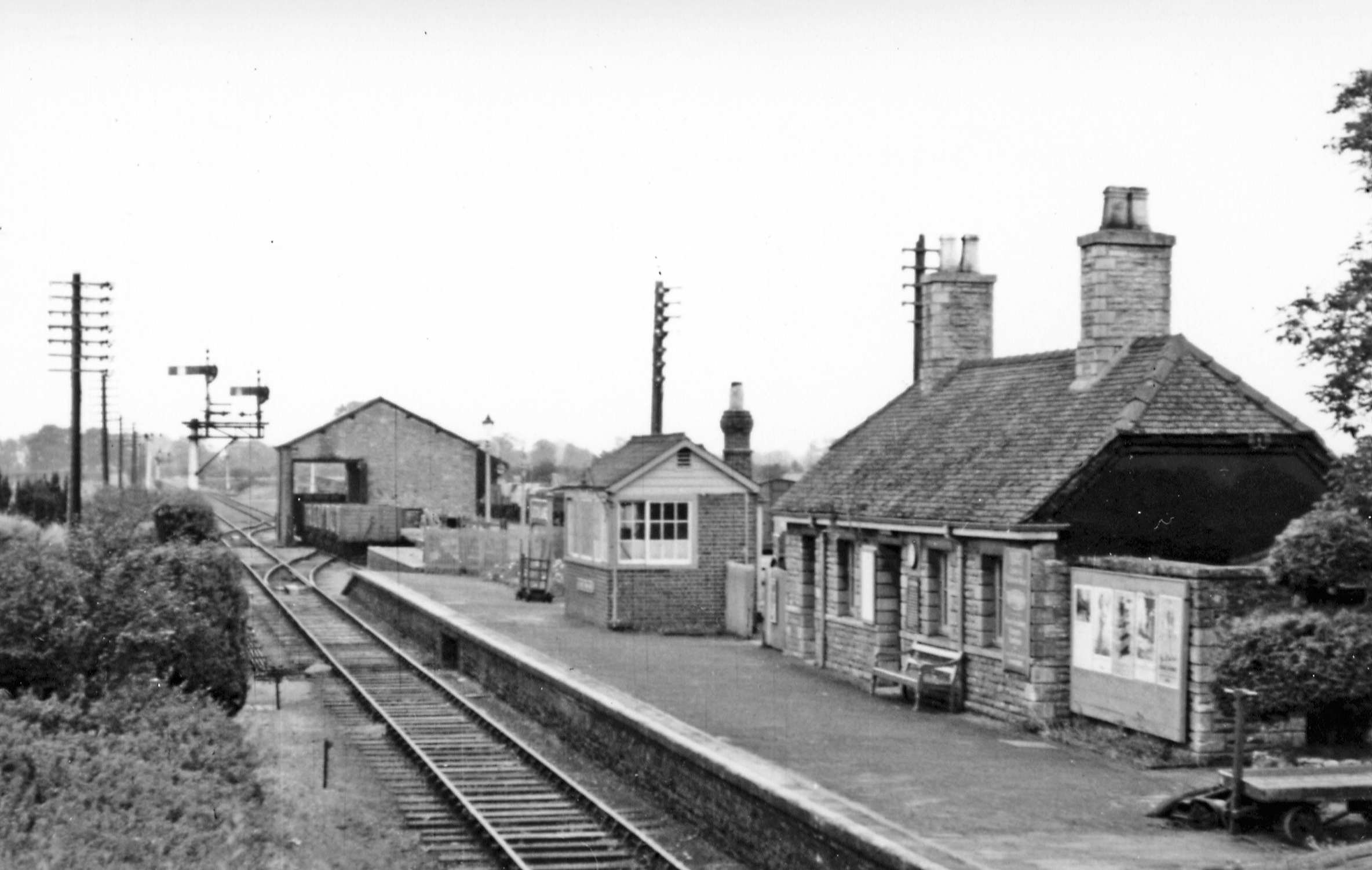
The town railway station in 1950

The main roads through the town are busy, as the town is at the crossroads of the A417 and A361. Where the A361 enters the town from the south it crosses the River Thames on Halfpenny Bridge. Another tributary of the Thames, the River Coln, joins the Thames at the Inglesham Round House.

The town's railway station opened in 1873 and closed in 1962.

== Religious sites ==
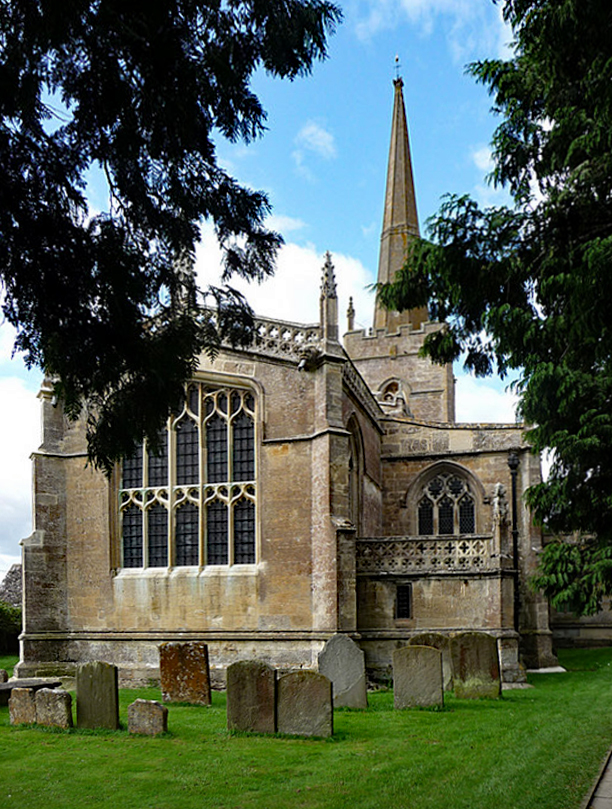
St Lawrence, Lechlade

The Church of England parish church of St Lawrence is a Grade I listed building. It replaced an earlier structure in the 15th century (probably around 1470–1476), though the nave roof and clerestory, the north porch, and the tower and spire may have been added in the early 16th century. A west gallery for singers was installed in 1740 and there were further internal additions in the 1880s. The church contains a Monumental brass of John Twynyho (died 1485), set into his ledger stone on floor of north aisle. He, and his wife Agnes, acquired the manor of "Hallecourte" in Lechlade. This may have been the same property as "Butler's Court", a 4-yardland estate which in 1304 had been granted by John de Bellew to John Butler. John Twynyho of Cirencester was lord of Butler's Court in 1479.

There is a Baptist church on Sherborne Street which was built in 1817.

== Notable people ==
- Reginald Arkell (1881–1959) was born in Lechlade. He went on to train as a journalist and then became a script writer and comic novelist who wrote many musical plays for the London theatre.
- Thomas Prence (1599–1673), emigrated to America in 1621 and was a co-founder of Eastham, Massachusetts, a political leader in both the Plymouth and Massachusetts Bay Colonies, and governor of Plymouth, Massachusetts (1634, 1638, and 1657–1673).
- Roman Bilinski (2004–) born in Lechlade to Polish Parents, and is a racing driver, previously competing in Championships like Formula 3, FRECA, Formula Regional European Championship.
