= West London Railway =

Railway in London

The West London Railway was conceived to link the London and Birmingham Railway and the Great Western Railway with the Kensington Basin of the Kensington Canal, enabling access to and from London docks for the carriage of goods. It opened in 1844 but was not commercially successful.

In 1863 the canal was closed and the railway extended southwards on its alignment as the West London Extension Railway, crossing the River Thames on a new bridge and connecting with the London Brighton and South Coast Railway and the London and South Western Railway south of the Thames. Local and long-distance passenger traffic was carried, and goods traffic exchanging between the connected railways. Passenger traffic declined after 1940, but the line remained open for sporadic freight services. In recent years regular local passenger services have revived the traffic on the line.

== Origins ==
The short "Kensington Canal" was opened on 12 August 1828, running from the River Thames a little west of Battersea Bridge to a basin near Kensington Road and Uxbridge Road, in a relatively undeveloped area to the west of London. The Times reported that "the canal runs from the Thames, near the Battersea-bridge, directly north two miles and a quarter, terminating close to the great Western road."

It had been intended that the canal would be extended further north to the Grand Junction Canal (Note: Later forming a constituent part of the Grand Union Canal; this part of the canal was sometimes referred to as the "Paddington Canal".) but the cost of the section built was much more than estimated. The canal was tidal, like the Thames, and the traffic and income from it were substantially less than hoped for, and the extension was dropped.

The London and Birmingham Railway (L&BR) and the Great Western Railway were projected in the early 1830s. Their London terminals would be on the north-west margin of London, and at that time they considered it essential to have a connection to the London docks east of London Bridge: a railway to a canal connected with the Thames might serve this purpose. In February 1836 the canal proprietors accepted an offer for their canal from the new Birmingham, Bristol and Thames Junction Railway. (Note: Some references erroneously quote the company name as Bristol, Birmingham and Thames Junction Railway)

Birmingham, Bristol and Thames Junction Railway Act 1836
- Act of Parliament
- Parliament of the United Kingdom
- Long title: An Act for making a Railway from the Basin of the Kensington Canal at Kensington to join the London and Birmingham and Great Western Railways at or near Holsden Green in the County of Middlesex, and to be called "The Birmingham, Bristol and Thames Junction Railway."
- Citation: 6 & 7 Will. 4. c. lxxix

Dates
- Royal assent: 21 June 1836

Text of statute as originally enacted

The railway company obtained an act of Parliament, the Birmingham, Bristol and Thames Junction Railway Act 1836 (6 & 7 Will. 4. c. lxxix) on 21 June 1836 authorising it to build a railway from Holsden Green (later called Harlesden), under the Paddington Canal at Wormholt Scrubbs (later Wormwood Scrubs), under the Uxbridge Road (then the Oxford Road) and under the Hammersmith Turnpike.

Construction of the line was much delayed, and meanwhile the Great Western Railway (GWR) was being built across its path. A flat crossing was arranged, and by agreement of 4 February 1837 GWR trains would have precedence with signals and heavy barriers across the BB&TJR line provided under the control of a GWR man.

In 1839 the railway completed purchase of the canal for £36,000, of which £10,000 was in cash and £26,000 in their own shares at face value.

Birmingham, Bristol and Thames Junction Railway Act 1840
- Act of Parliament
- Parliament of the United Kingdom
- Long title: An Act to amend and enlarge some of the Provisions of the Act relating to the Birmingham, Bristol, and Thames Junction Railway; and to authorize the Company to raise a further Sum of Money for the Purposes of the said Undertaking.
- Citation: 3 & 4 Vict. c. cv

Dates
- Royal assent: 23 July 1840

Other legislation
- Amends: Birmingham, Bristol and Thames Junction Railway Act 1836

Text of statute as originally enacted

As the calls on shares became due some of the shareholders defaulted and arrears soon amounted to £28,000: the company was unable to pay current bills. On 23 July 1840 statutory authority to raise a further £75,000 was obtained in the Birmingham, Bristol and Thames Junction Railway Act 1840 (3 & 4 Vict. c. cv), and the opportunity provided by this second application to Parliament was used to change the name to the West London Railway Company.

Money was still scarce, and it was not until 1843 that the company managed to clear its bills. Construction was further delayed, resumed in March 1843.

In 1839 Samuel Clegg and Jacob Samuda, approached the company for permission to use its uncompleted line for trials of their atmospheric system, with stationary engines exhausting air from a pipe laid between the rails; a carriage on the train carried a piston inside the pipe and the air pressure provided tractive force.

Part of the trackbed for about a half mile south from the GWR crossing was allocated to them, and they started demonstrations on 11 June 1840, having laid their own track. Trials and public demonstrations continued intermittently into 1842, and at length the railway company wanted possession of the land to lay its own railway. This seems to have involved conflict, and the company only got possession in 1843, having paid a sum in compensation. There is no suggestion that there was any intention to use the system on the line.

== Opening at last ==
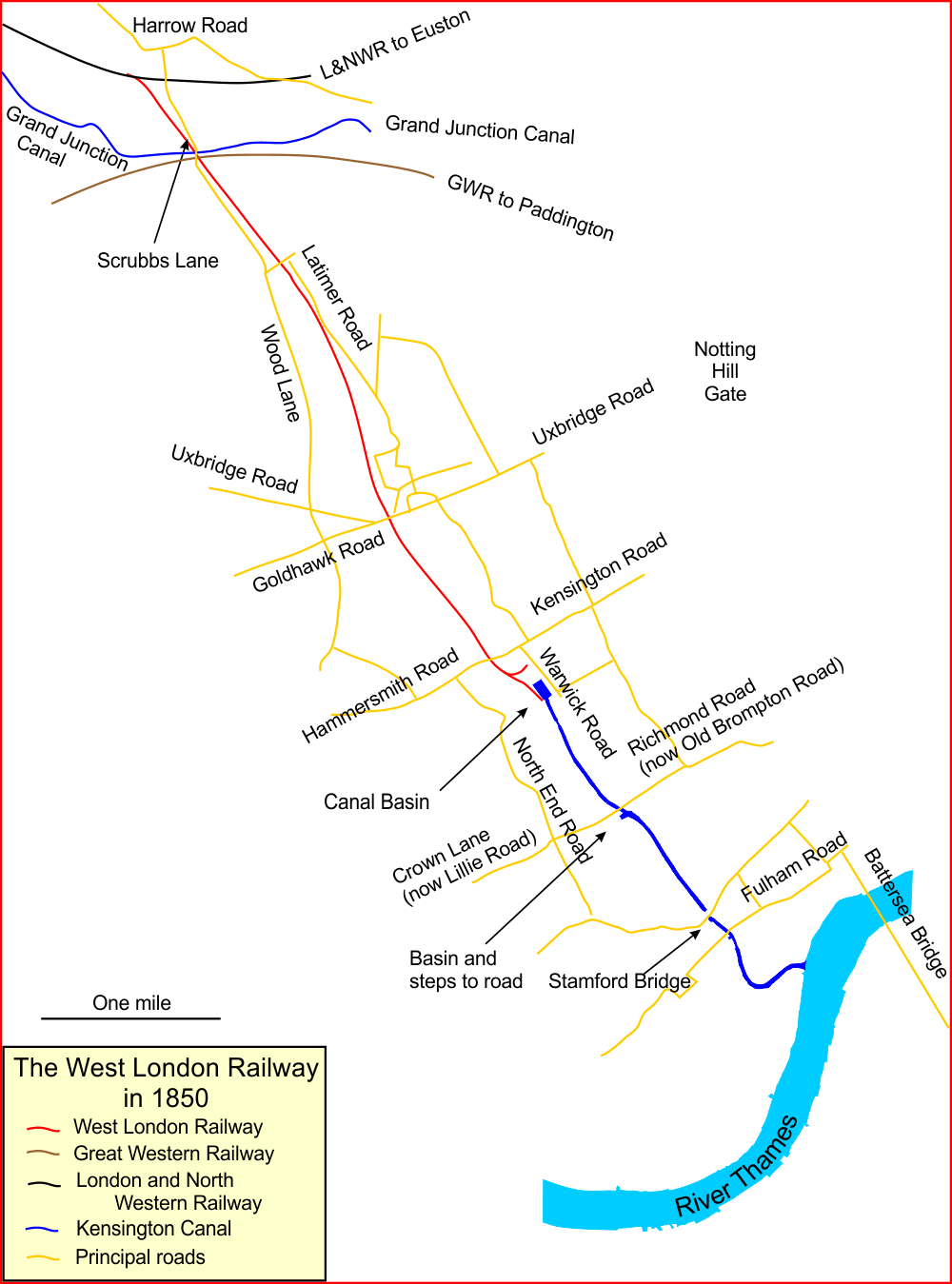
The West London Railway in 1850

The line finally opened on Whit Monday 27 May 1844, and for two days a 30-minute interval passenger service operated between Wormwood Scrubs and Kensington. Subsequently, a normal service was instituted; the passenger stations were at Kensington, Shepherds Bush, an exchange platform at the point of crossing the GWR main line, and at the junction with the London and Birmingham line. The Kensington station was immediately to the north of Counter's Bridge, and the goods connection to the canal basin was on the south side.

MacDermot gives a diagram for the "West London Crossing" in 1844; the WLR crosses under the Grand Junction Canal (sometimes referred to as the Paddington Canal) in a short tunnel; there is a "turntable for the exchange of traffic" to the east of the WLR and south of the GWR, with a siding connection from each line to the turntable but no other connection.

The timetable for 10 June 1844 shows seven Down (northbound) trains, four to the L&BR interchange and three to the GWR interchange; no train called at both, and the "Junction Station" for the GWR is on a terminal line in MacDermot's diagram. Only four Up trains are shown, two each from "G.W. Junction" and "L. & B. Junction". Connections were arranged by the other railways.

Timekeeping by trains from the L&BR was very poor, due to the crossing of the GWR; the signalman there had no telegraphic communication, and was instructed not to allow a WLR train to cross if a GWR train was expected or overdue.

The line was single track, with mixed gauge south from the GWR. There was no through running line there: access for wagons was through a siding and a wagon turntable.

The passenger operation was not well used, and in some weeks only 50 passengers travelled. The line was losing £50 a week, and notice was given to the connecting railways that the operation would be terminated; this took effect after 30 November 1844. After closure the company had considerable debts and outstanding wages due, and the directors personally advanced money for this; the amount outstanding in January 1845 was said to be £60,000.

After the cessation of passenger services, several directors resigned, and there was considerable difficulty in finding replacements. When this was done, the new directors "found the affairs of the company in a state of far greater embarrassment and difficulty than they had anticipated". Debts now amounted to £60,000, and the contractor had filed a bill in Chancery for non-payment of a debt: the line had been seized and advertised for sale.

== A dormant period ==
The line was now closed, but by agreement of 11 March 1845 the L&BR started to run occasional goods trains.

The London and Birmingham Railway Act 1845 (8 & 9 Vict. c. clvi) authorised the GWR and the L&BR to take a joint lease of the line for 999 years. The GWR had ideas of extending the line to cross the Thames to Vauxhall, but this was dropped during the financial collapse of 1848/49. The line was used only to carry coal—the LNWR used it for a considerable traffic to Shepherd's Bush and Warwick Road Basin, Kensington, which was the original canal terminal. Passenger service was not re-introduced. However they did nothing to develop the business of the line until in 1849 the WLR sought an arbitration judgment against them, which they got.

West London Railway Act 1854
- Act of Parliament
- Parliament of the United Kingdom
- Long title: An Act for determining the existing Lease of the West London Railway to the London and North-western Railway Company, and for enabling the last-mentioned Company and the West London Railway Company to enter into fresh Arrangements for the Sale or Lease of the Undertaking of the West London Railway Company to the London and North-western Railway Company, and for the Settlement of all Disputes between the said Companies; and for other Purposes.
- Citation: 17 & 18 Vict. c. cciv

Dates
- Royal assent: 31 July 1854

Text of statute as originally enacted

The West London Railway Act 1854 (17 & 18 Vict. c. cciv) was obtained under which the company's operation was vested in the LNWR, as successor to the London and Birmingham Railway from 1846, and the GWR. (Note: The railway was vested in them, but the West London Railway Company itself remained in existence until nationalisation of the railways in 1948)

== A collision, and then first signs of progress ==
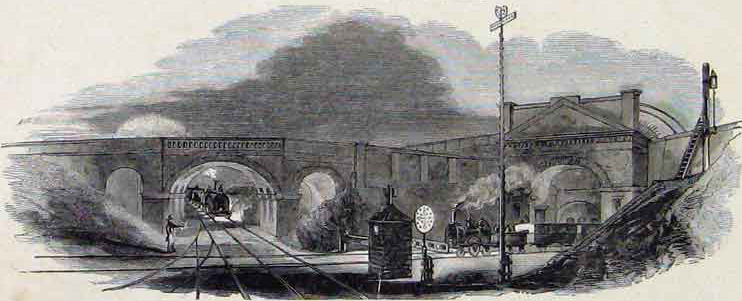
The flat crossing of the West London Railway and the Great Western Railway in 1844

There was a collision at the crossing with the GWR in November 1855, and the guard of an LNWR train was killed. There were "heavy barriers" protecting the GWR from trains on the WLR at the crossing, and signals on the GWR. There was another signalman to operate a distant signal a mile west, in Acton Cutting. He was to repeat the indication of the crossing signal, by visual observation. The collision took place on a dark morning, when a GWR goods train ran into a LNWR train crossing its path. The LNWR train was being propelled, as "there were no means of running round on the West London". The GWR train consisted of "68 waggons with the only guard's van next the second engine".

This may have been the motivation for the owners to consider improving the line. The GWR seems to have taken the lead, obtaining authority in an act of Parliament to double the line and extend it south over the River Thames to join the London and Southampton Railway (later the London and South Western Railway: the L&SWR), and, by the South Western Railway Act 1859 (22 & 23 Vict. c. xliv), eliminate the flat crossing at the north end.

The latter was swiftly put into effect, with a new line crossing over their main line by a bridge, and a spur line making a connection. In the northwards direction, the spur diverged to the right at the new North Pole Junction; it then swung left, crossing under the new high-level line and jointing the GWR main line in the direction of Reading. The through line to and from Willesden had previously passed under the Paddington Canal, with a 1-in-36 gradient to get down to the low level; it now crossed it by a bridge, the new alignment displaced a little to the west.

This was timely, for in 1862 the London International Exhibition of Industry and Art opened in Kensington, and the LNWR started a service on 2 June to the Kensington terminus with seven trains each way from and to Harrow. Simultaneously they started running trains from Kensington to and from Camden (Chalk Farm), where there were connections for Fenchurch Street over the North London Railway.

== Crossing the Thames ==
West London Extension Railway Act 1859
- Act of Parliament
- Parliament of the United Kingdom
- Long title: An Act for the making and maintaining of the West London Extension Railway, and for other Purposes.
- Citation: 22 & 23 Vict. c. cxxxiv

Dates
- Royal assent: 13 August 1859

West London Extension Railway Act 1861
- Act of Parliament
- Parliament of the United Kingdom
- Long title: An Act for increasing the Capital of and conferring further Powers on the West London Extension Railway Company; and for other Purposes.
- Citation: 24 & 25 Vict. c. ccxxxiv

Dates
- Royal assent: 6 August 1861

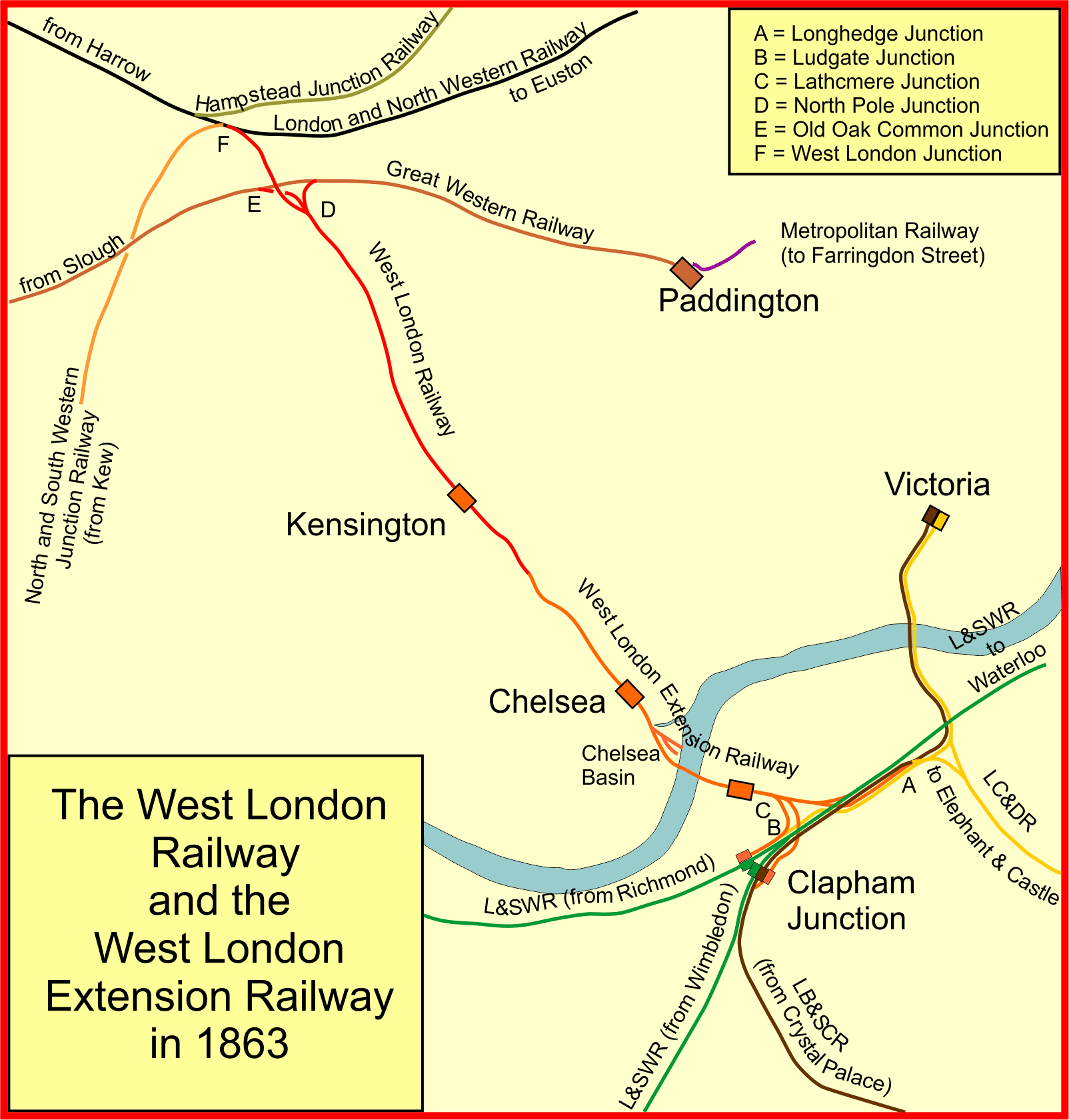
The West London and West London Extension Railways in 1863

The development of the suburbs meant that the time was now right to extend the line southwards to join railways on the south side of the River Thames. The West London Extension Railway (WLER) was created by the West London Extension Railway Act 1859 (22 & 23 Vict. c. cxxxiv), owned jointly by the subscribing companies.

The act authorised the company:

to construct (1) a line 4 miles 6 chains in length from a junction with the West London Railway at Kensington, crossing the Thames by a bridge to a junction with the Victoria Station and Pimlico Railway at Battersea; (Note: The Victoria Station and Pimlico Railway had built the northwards extension from Battersea, where the West End and Crystal Palace Railway and the London Chatham and Dover Railway had their first terminus; the West End of London and Crystal Palace Railway had brought the London Brighton and South Coast Railway to Battersea) (2) and (3) to branches to connect with the West End of London and Crystal Palace Railway near Clapham [Junction] station, and with the [London and] South Western Railway near the junction of its Richmond branch with the main line; (4) a branch from Battersea to the London and South Western Railway [facing towards Waterloo]; (5) a 27-chain branch to the mouth of the Kensington Canal; a dock in Fulham; and diversion of part of the Kensington Canal belonging to the West London Railway north of King's Road, Chelsea.

The LNWR and GWR subscribed £100,000 each, and the London and South Western Railway (L&SWR) and the London, Brighton and South Coast Railway (LB&SCR) subscribed £50,000 each.

West London Extension Railway Act 1863
- Act of Parliament
- Parliament of the United Kingdom
- Long title: An Act for increasing the Capital of and conferring further Powers on the West London Extension Railway Company; amending their Acts; providing for the Dissolution of the West London Railway Company; and for other Purposes.
- Citation: 26 & 27 Vict. c. ccviii

Dates
- Royal assent: 28 July 1863

Text of statute as originally enacted

But Carter (1959) refers to additional subscriptions after the opening, under the West London Extension Railway Act 1863 (26 & 27 Vict. c. ccviii):

By the Act of July 28, 1863, four subscribing companies were authorized to furnish capital (in addition to the original capital of £105,000) to the extent of £50,000 each by the London and North Western and Great Western Railways, and £25,000 each by the London and South Western and London, Brighton and South Coast Railways; these four companies having previously subscribed £105,000 between them.

The new line opened on 2 March 1863. The LNWR and the GWR leased the original WLR between them. At this time Samuel Carter served as solicitor, as he had done as early as 1845.

The line was on the alignment of the defunct Kensington Canal, crossing the Thames by New Battersea Bridge (known locally as Cremorne Bridge). In these days long before street tramcars and tube railways—the world's first Underground railway, the Metropolitan Railway opened earlier in 1863—the provision of through trains to all possible destinations seemed to be desirable, even if the frequency was very low.

At the southern end of the new line, it divided to give through running in several directions:

- east towards Waterloo on the L&SWR line; however only the earthworks were constructed at first; the actual track was not laid until 6 July 1865, to enable a new Euston - Willesden - Waterloo - London Bridge service.
- west to separate platforms at Clapham Junction adjacent to the Richmond line platforms on the L&SWR line; there was no through connection;
- diving under the L&SWR and LB&SCR main lines and turning west to platforms at Clapham Junction adjacent to the LB&SCR platforms, joining their line at the west end of the station, facing Brighton;
- diving under those main lines and turning east to Longhedge Junction, joining the West End of London and Crystal Palace Railway operated by the LB&SCR, giving access to Victoria, and the London, Chatham and Dover Railway (LC&DR) facing Bromley.

Clapham Junction station was opened on the same day as the WLER and had plenty of accommodation for each of the railways. The LC&DR took the opportunity to build a line from the WLER platforms partly paralleling the WLER line to Longhedge Junction and onward, apparently intending to give connections to Ludgate Hill.

The WLER had stations at Chelsea and Battersea, and the terminal station at Kensington was extended and rebuilt some distance to the north; it had one long platform on the east side of the line. There was a goods station at Lillie Bridge and a short branch to Chelsea Basin. (Chelsea Basin was the remaining stub of the canal, at the confluence with the Thames.)

Mixed-gauge track was provided from the GWR junction via Longhedge Junction to Victoria (LC&DR station), (Note: Strictly speaking the station and its approaches were owned by the Victoria Station and Pimlico Railway Company; the eastern part of Victoria station was leased for 999 years to the LC&DR and GWR jointly) and from 1 April 1863 GWR trains from Southall to Victoria operated over the line. The branch to the WLR at Old Oak Common was known as "the Victoria Branch". Mixed gauge was also provided to the WLER platforms on both the L&SWR and the LB&SCR sides of Clapham Junction, although it is unlikely that the L&SWR side ever carried a broad-gauge vehicle.

In autumn 1866 the broad gauge service to Victoria was cut back to Chelsea Basin, and broad gauge passenger services ceased in 1875. The broad gauge rails were removed by 1890.

The infrastructure at the south end may have been lavish, but the initial train service was a little more modest:

- LNWR, three trains a day from Harrow to Kensington; and trains from Camden LNWR station to Kensington, reversing at West London Junction (there was no station at Willesden at this period);
- LB&SCR, Kensington to New Croydon via Crystal Palace; in several cases these were through working of the LNWR trains;
- L&SWR, Kensington to Clapham Junction; the eastwards spur towards Waterloo was not yet open.

== Further development ==
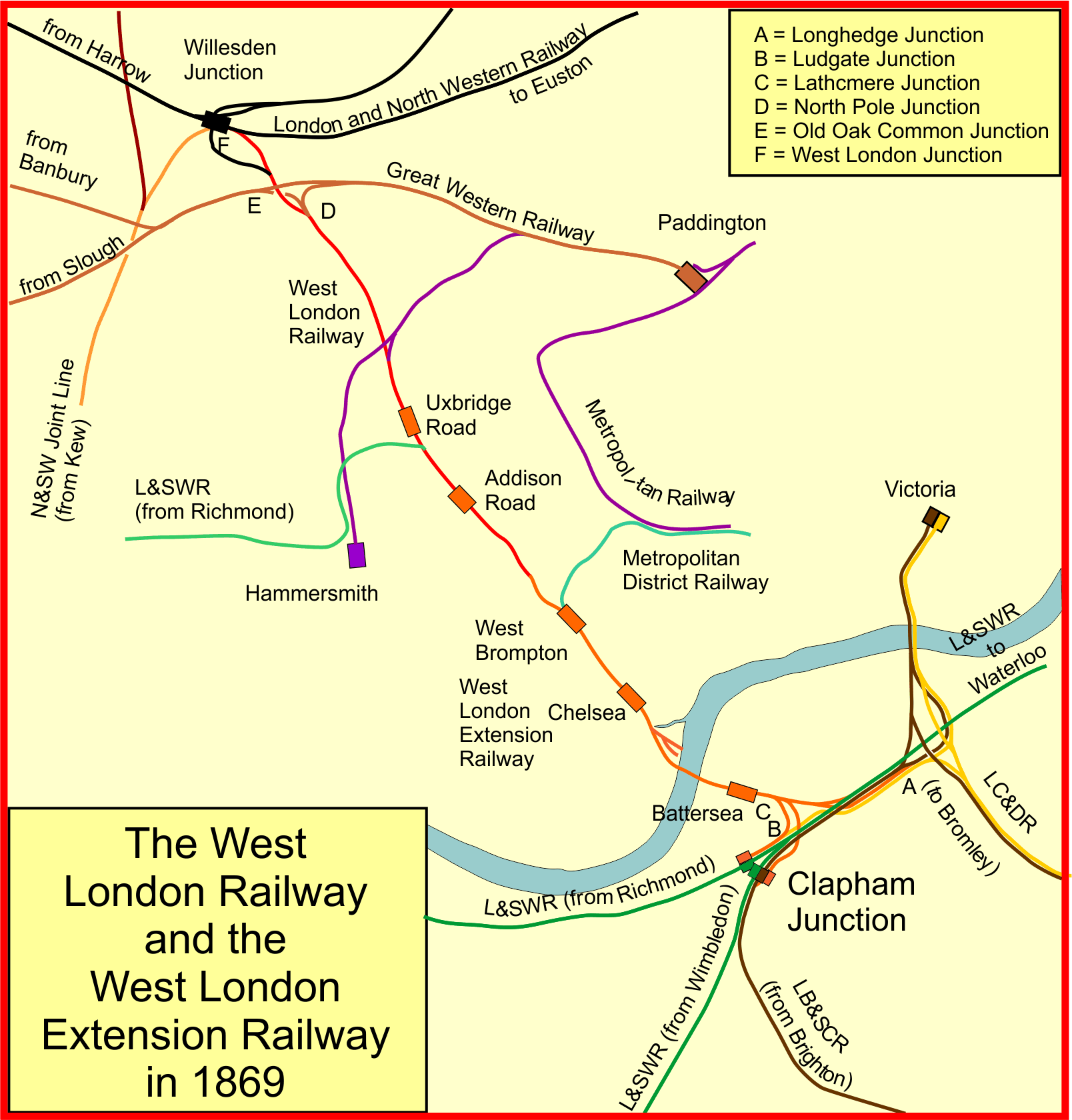
The West London and West London Extension Railways in 1869

In 1869 the new much-extended Kensington (Addison Road) station opened; it is said to have had the first scissors crossovers in a station installed at that time.

Addison Road became the focus of a complex pattern of services to the cities of London and Westminster, encouraging residential housing for businessmen. Several new railway lines were built intersecting the WLR and making connections with it, and the line became home to goods terminals of the several railways making connection.

As well as the GWR service from Southall to Victoria, there was from 1 July 1864 a broad gauge service to and from the Hammersmith and City Railway via a new connection at Latimer Road; in 1872 this developed into the Middle Circle between Moorgate and Mansion House, via Baker Street, Addison Road and Earl's Court (Metropolitan District Railway). In September 1867 the LNWR started a 30-minute interval service from Broad Street to Kensington, later extended to the LBSCR Victoria station, and later still to Mansion House, forming the Outer Circle.

When the L&SWR opened a branch north-west and then south from Kensington to Richmond via Turnham Green, it started a Richmond to Waterloo service on 1 January 1869.

At some date after 1869, the LNWR opened an extensive coal depot in sidings south of the curve to the LB&SCR side of Clapham Junction; the depot was named Falcon Lane. On the inside of the curve, between it and the LB&SCR main lines, there were a small group of stabling sidings known informally as Pig Hill Sidings, used for exchange of goods vehicles between the LNWR and the LB&SCR.

== After 1914 ==
In the nineteenth century there had been a demand for through trains from Kensington and Chelsea to all parts of the business districts; some of these routes were exceptionally circuitous and slow, and in many cases infrequent. With the rise of tube railways in the first decades of the twentieth century, frequent and more direct services became available, and changing lines was acceptable because of the frequency. At the same time electric trams offered competition, with their frequent services.

The usage of West London trains declined considerably, and the train service was reduced accordingly. The onset of the Second World War brought this decline to a head, and the LMS (as successor to the LNWR) electric services from Willesden ceased on 3 October 1940. On 20 October 1940 the steam services ended, together with the London Transport service from Edgware Road via Earls Court, and Battersea, Chelsea & Fulham and West Brompton stations were closed.

On 19 December 1946 Addison Road was renamed Kensington (Olympia) and supported a special London Transport service when public exhibitions were in progress. There was also a limited unadvertised steam service from Clapham Junction in connection with the offices of the Post Office Savings Bank. About 30 goods trains passed each way daily.

Although the line had potential for through long-distance passenger services, this never materialised except in very limited volumes.

The northern section of the line, from Willesden Junction to Kensington Olympia and on to Earls Court, was electrified by the LNWR in 1915, but passenger use of the line dwindled under competition from road transport and the London Passenger Transport Board lines, and passenger services were discontinued after bomb damage in 1940.

== Electric trains ==
The first electric trains on the route were the joint Great Western Railway and Metropolitan Railway trains, between the connection from the Hammersmith & City line near Latimer Road, and Kensington. This started at the end of 1906 on the four-rail system. The live rails continued south as far as Lillie Bridge Depot.

The LNWR operated their electric train service between Willesden Junction and Earls Court from 1914.

All electric train operation ceased in 1940 due to enemy action, and only the Earls Court to Kensington (Olympia) service was resumed afterwards, in 1946.

Capitalstar operation brought third rail electrification throughout.

== East curve at North Pole Junction ==
Cobb's Atlas shows an east curve at North Pole Junction, apparently enabling through running from Kensington towards Paddington. A caption indicates that this closed in 1869. Cooke shows more detail, indicating a route through "West London Yard Line". "West London Carriage Sidings" intermediate signal box is shown on this line in the archive of the Signalling Record Society.

Comparing Ordnance Survey maps, the carriage sidings were built at some time between 1874 and 1894 in the south-east quadrant of the crossing of the WLR and the GWR main line, and the connection occupies the perimeter of the sidings. The line is shown in 1967 and is absent in 1975.

== Punch's Railway ==
Many references assert that the WLR became known as "Punch's Railway", due to the constant lampooning of it by the humorous periodical Punch. Arthur William à Beckett, son of one of Punch's first writers, Gilbert Abbott à Beckett, wrote in his autobiography, describing his childhood at a time when his father lived in Kensington:

Portland House, North End, Fulham, half a century ago, had some very fine pleasure grounds. To-day, if you look at it, you find it the corner house of a terrace. In its front are a number of railway lines, as it is not two hundred yards distant from the Addison Road Station, Kensington. It was proposed to start a local line which, amongst other projects, was to annex our garden. My father, to use a colloquial expression, was "full against it," and did his utmost to prevent its execution. Week after week appeared attacks upon the objectionable line, until it came to be known as "Punch's Railway." My father described the erection of the station and the establishment of the cabstand. According to Punch, there was so little traffic that the station-master was wont to grow cabbages between the sleepers, and train vegetable marrows along the rails. Then one cab turned up with a horse and a driver. The next day the driver disappeared, and the horse stood in his place for twelve hours. The third day the horse had disappeared with the driver. Then the horseless cab stood on the cabstand deserted for a fortnight. At the end of that time the coachman appeared without a horse and dragged away the cab single-handed. But the attacks were of no service to their author. The railway ultimately became what it now, I believe, still is, the most prosperous line in the world. If I have not been misinformed, that mile of railway in front of Portland House is leased by some of the leading English hues, and pays a dividend of enormous proportions on the original stock. My father made up his mind to give up his house, and removed further East, taking up his residence in ... Hyde Park Gate.

North End Road is somewhat to the west of the line.
