= Diamond Jubilee Footbridge =

Foot- and cycle bridge over the Thames in London, England

Cremorne Footbridge
- Coordinates: 51.4724°N 0.1786°W
- Carries: Pedestrians; cyclists
- Crosses: River Thames
- Locale: Wandsworth: Battersea; Hammersmith and Fulham: Imperial Wharf
- Other name(s): Diamond Jubilee Footbridge
- Owner: Wandsworth Council
- Maintained by: Wandsworth Council
- Preceded by: Wandsworth Bridge (to south-west)
- Followed by: Battersea Railway Bridge (to north-east)

Characteristics
- Material: Painted steel
- Total length: 240 metres (790 ft)
- Width: 9 metres (30 ft)
- Height: 17 metres (56 ft)
- No. of spans: 4
- Piers in water: 3

History
- Architect: www.one-worlddesign.co.uk
- Designer: One-World Design architects
- Engineering design by: Expedition Engineering; Beckett Rankine
- Construction start: June 2016 (currently suspended)
- Construction cost: £32m (two-thirds approved and saved)

Statistics
- Daily traffic: Pedestrians and bicycles
- Toll: none

The Cremorne Footbridge is a proposed foot and cycle bridge over the Thames in London, England. It was originally promoted as the Diamond Jubilee Footbridge, designed by One World Design Architects with structural engineers Expedition Engineering and maritime engineers Beckett Rankine. The longer name commemorates the 2012 jubilee celebrations for Queen Elizabeth II, marking where she boarded her royal barge for the start of the Diamond Jubilee river pageant.

Through Community Infrastructure Levy contributions on nearby housing Wandsworth Council hold around 40% of the funding. Foundations have been built on their Battersea bank of the river, through a Section 106 Agreement with Barratt. A one-third balance of the cost, which has risen to £32,000,000 is sought from the Mayor's Office and Transport for London.

== Planning permissions and construction ==
Consent has been granted by Wandsworth; Hammersmith & Fulham; the GLA; and TfL. Wandsworth's Riverside strategic planning (specifically a document called the SPD) enables such area to receive Community Infrastructure Levy inputs. Some practical inputs are in a contemporary development's Section 106 agreement with Barratt London, for piling of the foundations on the Battersea side of the river – carried out. The bridge meets aims of local and regional planning policy.

The developer applied for planning permission in 2012 in both boroughs. In December 2012 the latter borough notified the Mayor of London of a planning application of potential strategic importance for the Mayor to make a statement of compliance with The London Plan and to respond. A report for these purposes was prepared by the Planning Decisions Unit of the authority. Permissions were received from the London Borough of Wandsworth in June 2013 and from Hammersmith and Fulham in November 2013.

The Mayor still declining funding in August 2020, a Mayor of London spokesperson said: “The Cremorne Bridge is a borough-led project. Given that there are already a number of cross-river connections in this part of west London, the Mayor has been clear that it is the responsibility of the bridge promoters to secure support, permission and funding for this scheme.” The forecast opening date is 2025, taking 18 months to build and audit.

== Architecture ==
The style of the bridge is a combination of bright and biomimetic adopting the tensile strength and overall flexibility of a repeating cross-matrix of thin tapering sections. The bridge design has three spans comprising a small central arch flanked by two larger outer arches, supported by four piers. The maximum height of the bridge is 18.41m AOD, rising approximately 4.5m above the neighbouring railway bridge. The primary structure material is painted structural steel.

The deck is to be shared by pedestrians and cyclists.

The three‐span arrangement of the bridge, with larger outer spans and a smaller central span, maintains unobstructed access to the pier at Albion Quay on the south of the river. It also minimises the need for foundations in the river while limiting the structural height so that the bridge does not extend into the airspace required by the nearby Battersea Heliport. The use of diamond‐shaped steel sections both reflects the name of the bridge and allows the arch section size to be varied to provide efficiency, providing material only where it is needed. With the depth of the sections significantly reduced towards the top of the arches, the long‐views of the bridge will appear particularly elegant.

== Neighbouring bridge ==
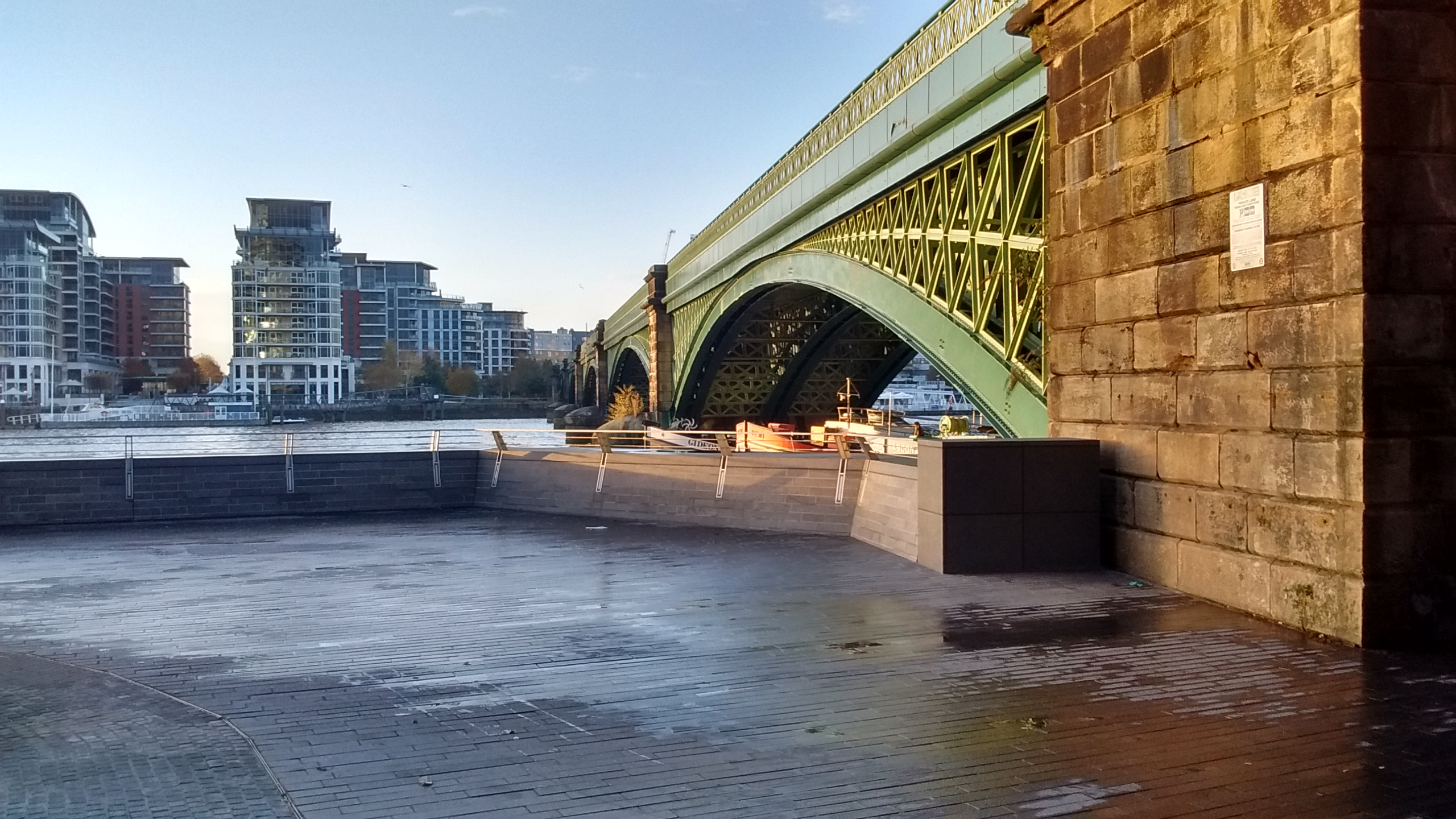
A space, clear for the eastern bridge footings, since 2017 home-building, adjacent to the railway bridge

The adjoining Battersea Railway Bridge is to be joined onto at the feet of the footbridge; it is a multi-arch bridge, with flat deck, opened on 2 March 1863.

== See also ==
- List of crossings of the River Thames
- List of bridges in London
