= Chris Wise =

English academic and engineer

- Born: 1956 (age 69–70); London, England
- Engineering career
- Discipline: Structural engineer
- Institutions: FREng, FICE, MIStructE, RDI, Hon FRIBA, FRSA
- Practice name: Expedition Engineering
- Projects: American Air Museum, Duxford; Millennium Bridge (London); Infinity Bridge, Stockton on Tees; 2012 Olympic Velodrome
- Awards: IStructE Gold Medal; Royal Academy of Engineering Silver Medal

Christopher Mark Wise (born 1956) is an English academic and engineer. Wise began his career with Ove Arup and Partners in 1979. After working in UK, Australia and US, he became Arup's youngest Director in 1992, and later became one of five Board Directors responsible for Building Engineering's 500 engineers and support staff. In 1999 he left Arup and co-founded Expedition Engineering together with Seán Walsh.

In 2008 Wise, Walsh and Ed McCann, the three remaining shareholders in Expedition Engineering, gave the company over to the benefit of its employees, becoming the Useful Simple Trust.

Wise was the first Professor of Creative Design at Imperial College, as well as Master of the Royal Designers for Industry 2007–2009. He is co-director of the Royal Designers Summer School and has been co-presenter at the BBC's reconstruction of several pieces of ancient technology.

Since 2012 Wise has spent two days a week at University College London (UCL) as Professor of Civil Engineering Design.

Wise has been a Member of IStructE since the 1980s and was awarded their Gold Medal in 2012. He is a Fellow of the Royal Academy of Engineering, and was awarded the academy's highest individual honour, the silver medal, in 2007. Since 2003 he has been a Trustee of the Design Council. In 2008, he became a Fellow of the Institution of Civil Engineers by presidential invitation.

"One of the most outstanding engineers of his generation. Projects such as the Torre del Collaerola, the War Museum in Duxford and the headquarters of the Commerzbank in Frankfurt exemplify his design flair. His enthusiasm and creativity inspire his colleagues and students. He is one of those rare role models which the profession desperately needs."

== Notable projects ==
- 2012 Olympic Velodrome, London
- Infinity Bridge, Stockton-on-Tees
- Millennium Bridge, London
- American Air Museum, Duxford
