= Tenfoot Bridge =

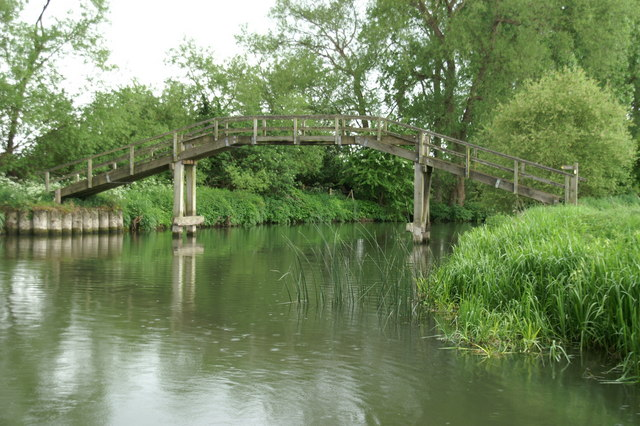
- Coordinates: 51.694223°N 1.489891°W
- Carries: Thames Path
- Crosses: River Thames
- Locale: Oxford

Characteristics
- Material: Wood
- Height: 12 feet 2 inches (3.71 m)
- No. of spans: 1

History
- Opened: 1869

Tenfoot Bridge is a wooden footbridge across the River Thames in Oxfordshire, England. It is situated on the reach above Shifford Lock and was built in 1869. It connects Buckland on the south bank to Chimney on the north.

The name derives from a pre-existing weir which had a 10-foot-wide flash lock (3.0 m) in it. In 1867 there were complaints about the state of the weir bridge and after a dispute, the Thames Conservancy removed the weir and built the bridge two years later.

The Thames Path passes the bridge on the north bank, but does not cross it. The path formerly crossed the bridge to Duxford south of the old course of the Thames.

== See also ==
- Crossings of the River Thames

| Next crossing upstream | River Thames | Next crossing downstream |
| Tadpole Bridge (road) | Tenfoot Bridge | Duxford Ford and Shifford Lock Cut footbridge |
| Next crossing upstream | Thames Path | Next crossing downstream |
| northern bank Tadpole Bridge | Tenfoot Bridge | southern bank Newbridge |
