= Battersea Railway Bridge =

Bridge across the River Thames in London

Coordinates: 51°28′23″N 0°10′45″W

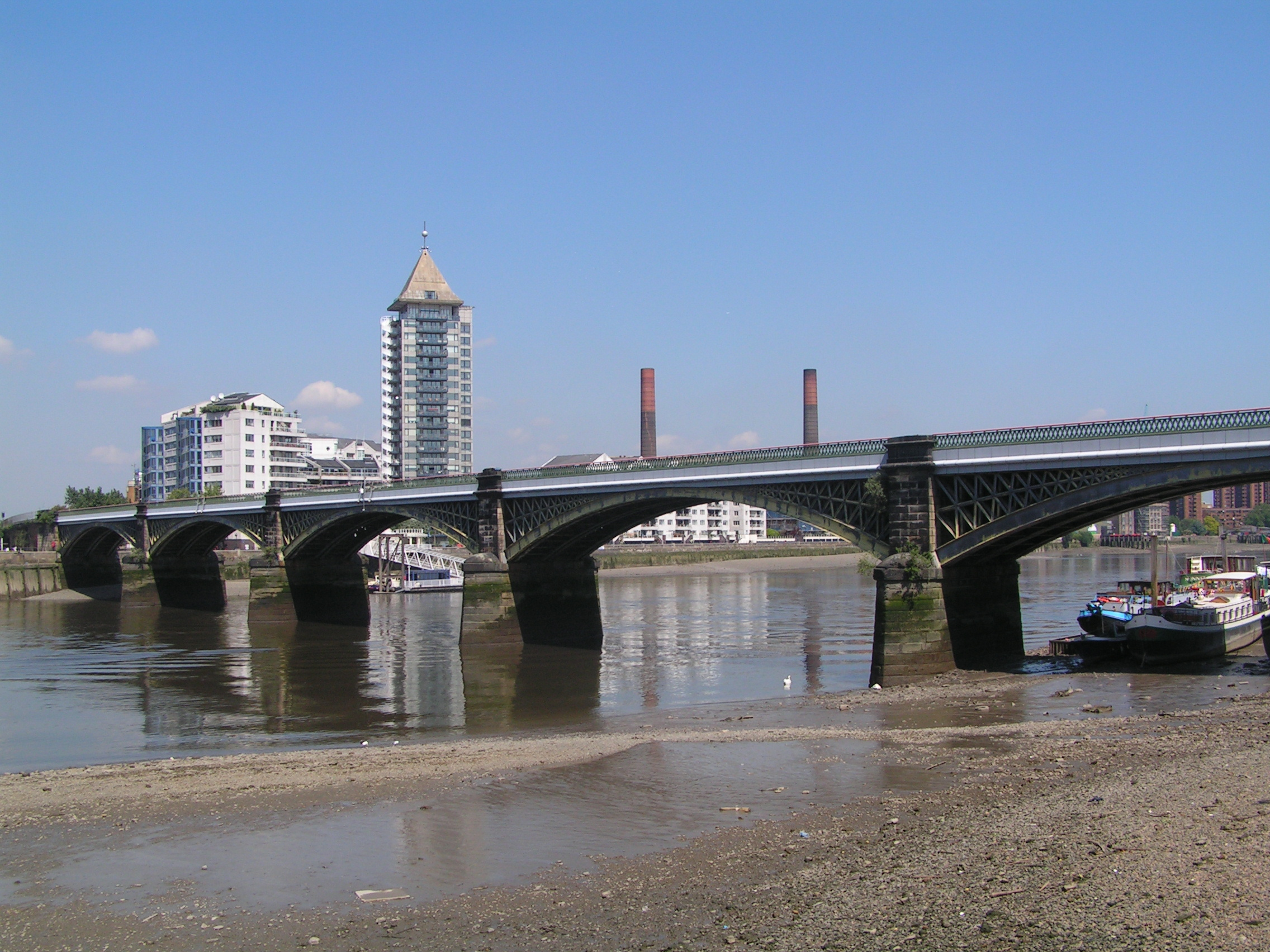
- Battersea Railway Bridge from the south west
- Carries: Railway
- Crosses: River Thames
- Locale: London, England
- Maintained by: Transport for London
- Heritage status: Grade II* listed structure
- Preceded by: Diamond Jubilee Footbridge (two shared piers - in construction)
- Followed by: Battersea Bridge

Characteristics
- Design: Arch bridge
- Total length: 230m (plus approaches)
- Width: 10.5m
- Longest span: 42.5m
- Clearance below: 6m (above MHWS)

History
- Opened: 2 March 1863; 163 years ago

Statistics
- Daily traffic: 8 scheduled passenger trains per hour (05:45 - 23:30), plus additional unscheduled freight trains

Location
- Interactive map of Battersea Railway Bridge

The Battersea Railway Bridge (originally called the Cremorne Bridge, after the riverside public Cremorne Gardens in Chelsea, and formerly commonly referred to as the Battersea New Bridge) is a bridge across the River Thames in London, between Battersea and Fulham. It is used by the West London Line of the London Overground from Clapham Junction to Willesden Junction. Dating from 1863, the bridge is one of the oldest crossings over the Thames in London.

The bridge's completion provided a connection between the main northbound lines out of Paddington and Euston with the southbound lines of Waterloo, Victoria and Clapham Junction via the West London Extension Railway. It was originally furnished with both standard gauge and broad gauge tracks, the latter taking GWR trains to Victoria. (Note: The statement in the Historic England listing that the bridge was exclusively used by freight traffic up until 1904 is false, as demonstrated by the building of Battersea railway station on the same line in 1863.) It has been refurbished multiple times throughout its operating life. It is presently owned by Network Rail Infrastructure Ltd (who use Chelsea River Bridge as its official name), and links Battersea to the extreme north-east part of Fulham, known as Chelsea Harbour or Imperial Wharf, a regenerated area on the south side of Chelsea Creek.

== History ==
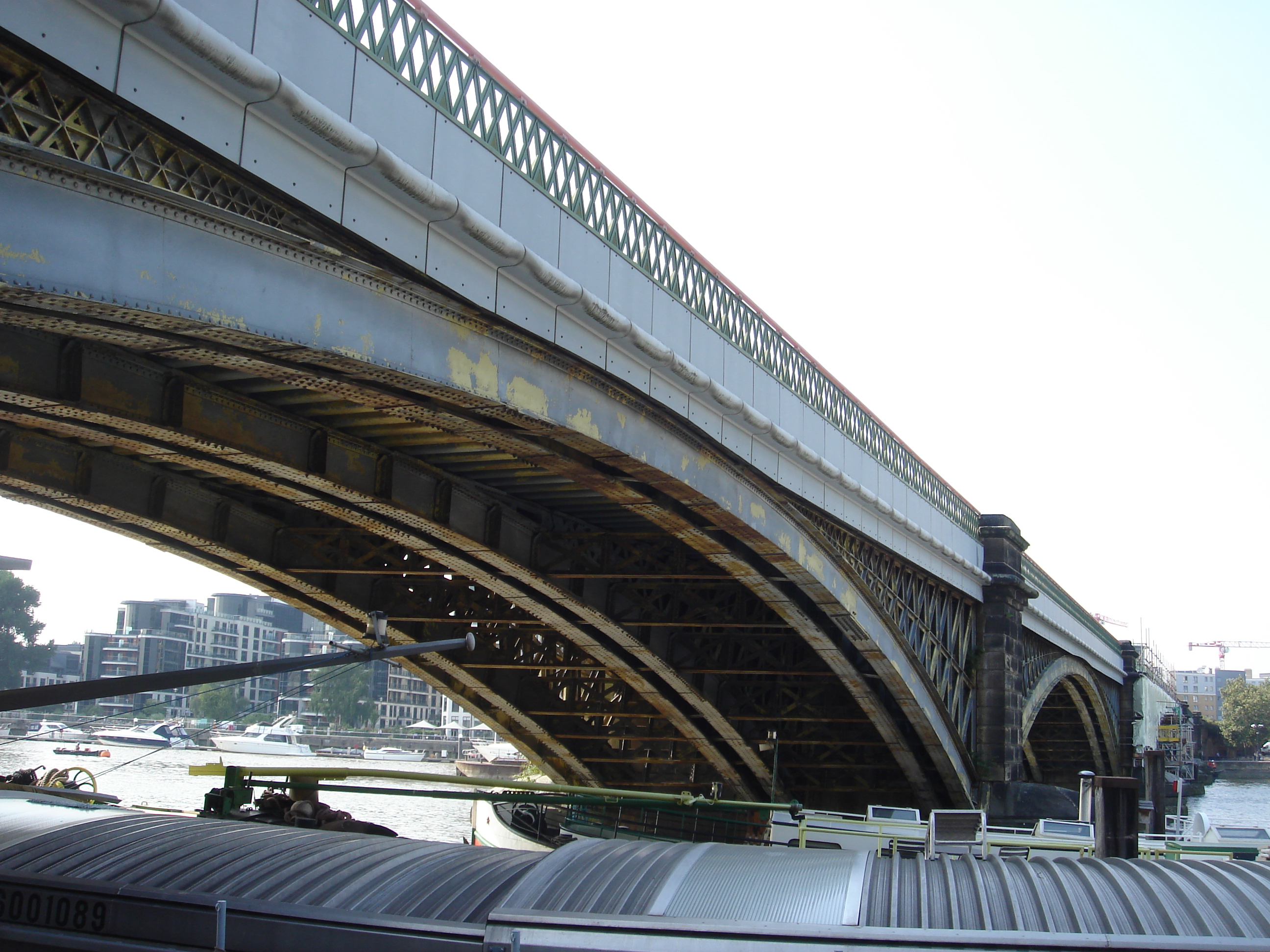
Battersea Railway Bridge

During 1859, Parliament gave its assent to the construction of the West London Extension Railway; one of the most prominent civil engineering projects of this new line would be the crossing of the River Thames at Battersea. Accordingly, the Battersea Railway Bridge was jointly designed by William Baker, chief engineer of the London and North Western Railway (LNWR), and T. H. Bertram of the Great Western Railway (GWR). The contractors for its construction were Brassey and Ogilvie; it was completed at a cost of £87,000 (equivalent to £9,500,000 in 2025).

On 2 March 1863, the bridge was officially opened to traffic; it was one of six railways bridges to be constructed during the 1860s. Initially, it carried both standard gauge and broad gauge tracks, the latter being necessary for the passage of the rolling stock of the GWR; a major impetus of the project had been to provide a direct connection between the Channel Ports and the GWR, as well as various other railway on the south side of the Thames, such as the South Eastern Railway. Ownership of the bridge was originally split up between several companies; specifically, the LNWR and GWR both held a one-third stake, while the London and South Western Railway and the London, Brighton and South Coast Railway held a one-sixth stake each.

In terms of its general configuration, the Battersea Railway Bridge comprises five arches composed of wrought iron that are flanked on either side by brick approach viaducts. Each of the five river spans are each 43.9m while the total length of the structure is 387.1m. The wrought iron segmental arches are relatively lightweight, being strengthened via pairs of ribs that are connected to lattice-type spandrel members to the deck girders; the structure is largely rivetted together. A total of six ribs are present in each span, the inner ribs being cross-braced underneath the tracks. It is suspected that, during various refurbishments during the twentieth century, some of the original ribs have been strengthened or even entirely replaced by steel counterparts; however, the upper and lower chords and spandrel members of the arches remain entirely composed of wrought iron through to the present day. The river piers are constructed of brick faced with stone ashlar on concrete foundations, complete with roll-moulded cornices at the level of the parapets. Similarly, the abutment piers of the bridge are also ashlar, while the parapets are topped by wrought iron lattice railings.

A three-arch brick viaduct carries the line on the north side of the bridge, with one arch having been opened to provide a pedestrian route under the railway, as part of the Thames Path. On the south side are four arches, two of which are used as storage for the residents of a houseboat community moored immediately downstream, and another one of which was opened to Thames Path pedestrian traffic as part of the Lombard Wharf development. During a refurbishment carried out between early 2013 and mid 2014, during which further repairs and strengthening works were undertaken, new offices and storage areas were developed underneath some of the arches.

The opening of the bridge was credited with a noticeable increase in freight traffic. Trains crossing the bridge are subject to a 20/30 mph speed limit (locomotive-hauled traffic is restricted to 20 mph, all other traffic is limited to 30 mph).

During 1969, works were carried out on the bridge to refurbish and strengthen it; similar work was taken out again in 1992. During a high tide in late 2003, the structure was struck by a refuse barge, causing substantial damage to some of the lower structural elements; repairs were completed in early 2004.

During 2008, the bridge was declared a Grade II* listed structure; this status is intended to preserve its special character and provide protection against any unsympathetic development. The decision to list the bridge was attributed to both architectural and historic reasons, it reportedly being the most complete of the six railway bridges that were constructed during the 1860s, as well as one of the earliest railway bridges to cross the Thames in general.

In November 2013, planning permission was granted for the Diamond Jubilee Footbridge, extending the two central piers of the bridge upstream.

== See also ==
- Crossings of the River Thames
- List of bridges in London
