= Cricklade Town Bridge =

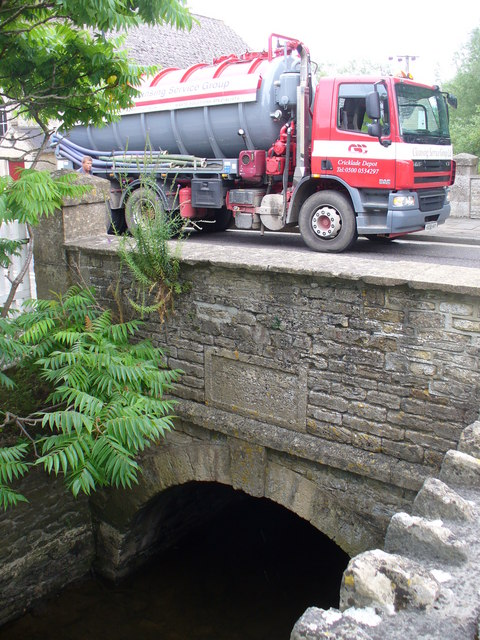
- Coordinates: 51.644439°N 1.854711°W
- Carries: A419 road
- Crosses: River Thames
- Locale: Cricklade

Characteristics
- Material: Limestone
- No. of spans: 1

History
- Opened: 1852

Cricklade Town Bridge is a road bridge at Cricklade, Wiltshire, England across the River Thames. It is a Grade II listed building.

== History ==
Formerly the bridge marked the ultimate limit of navigation on the River Thames, but the stretch of the river beyond Lechlade has fallen into disuse and the bridge can only be reached by very small craft.

The bridge is single arch level crossing at the north end of the town. It was built in 1854, there being no previous bridge on the site. The original Cricklade crossing was probably closer to the A419 Bridge where it carried Ermin Way. This road was at some time obliterated at the bend north of the bridge, and a road was deflected from it due south through the town. The River Churn joins the Thames just downstream of the bridge.

== Architecture ==
The bridge is built of limestone. On each side of the bridge near the parapet are panels recording its construction. It has a single arch over the Thames with a smaller northern arch which crosses the site of an earlier mill leat.

== See also ==
- Crossings of the River Thames

Next crossing upstream	River Thames	Next crossing downstream
Footbridge at 51°39′5″N 1°52′31″W; Midland and South Western Junction Railway bridge	Cricklade Town Bridge	Cricklade sewage works bridge (no public access); A419 Road Bridge (road)
