= Duxford, Oxfordshire =

Hamlet in Oxfordshire, England

Coordinates: 51.694°N 1.473°W

Duxford
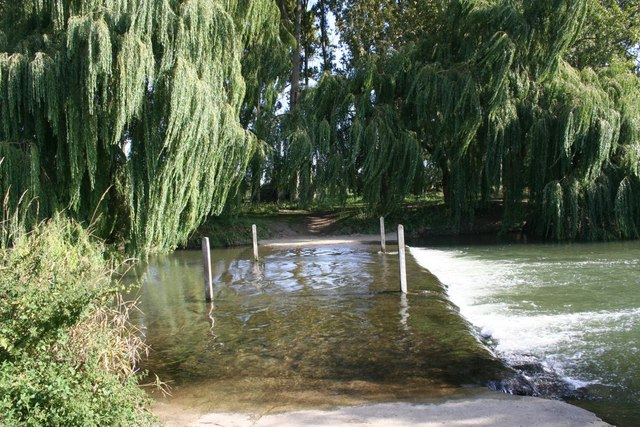
- The ford at Duxford

- Location within Oxfordshire
- OS grid reference: SU364996
- Civil parish: Hinton Waldrist
- District: Vale of White Horse
- Shire county: Oxfordshire
- Region: South East
- Country: England
- Sovereign state: United Kingdom
- Post town: Faringdon
- Postcode district: SN7
- Dialling code: 01865
- Police: Thames Valley
- Fire: Oxfordshire
- Ambulance: South Central
- UK Parliament: Wantage

Duxford is a hamlet in the civil parish of Hinton Waldrist, 5.5 miles (9 km) northeast of Faringdon. It was part of Berkshire until the 1974 boundary changes transferred it to Oxfordshire. It is on the south bank of the Thames, across which is its eponymous ford leading to a lock island which has a footbridge to Chimney on the north bank. This is the only ford today along the river, excluding along its intermittent brook at the source village, Kemble, Gloucestershire however the ford only crosses part of the river.

== History ==
Duxford's toponym has evolved from Dudochesforde in the Domesday Book of 1086 via Dukesford in the 13th century, and Duddelesford and Dodekelesford in the 14th century before reaching its present form. The manor of Duxford had three taxable hides. A Saxon called Alwi held it during the reign of Edward the Confessor, but by the time of the Domesday Book it had been granted to William of Normandy's half-brother Odo, Bishop of Bayeux. The Domesday Book recorded a fishery and a watermill at Duxford. The watermill was still in existence in 1219. Until the 20th century there was a ferry across the Thames here. In 1898 the Shifford Lock Cut was opened, controlling the flow of the river past Duxford.

== See also ==
- Crossings of the River Thames

== Sources ==
- Page, W.H.; Ditchfield, P.H., eds. (1924). A History of the County of Berkshire, Volume 4. Victoria County History. pp. 463–466.

Next crossing upstream	River Thames	Next crossing downstream
Tenfoot Bridge	Duxford, Oxfordshire	Newbridge
