= Rotherhithe crossing =

Proposed route across the River Thames in London, England

Coordinates: 51.50264°N 0.02992°W

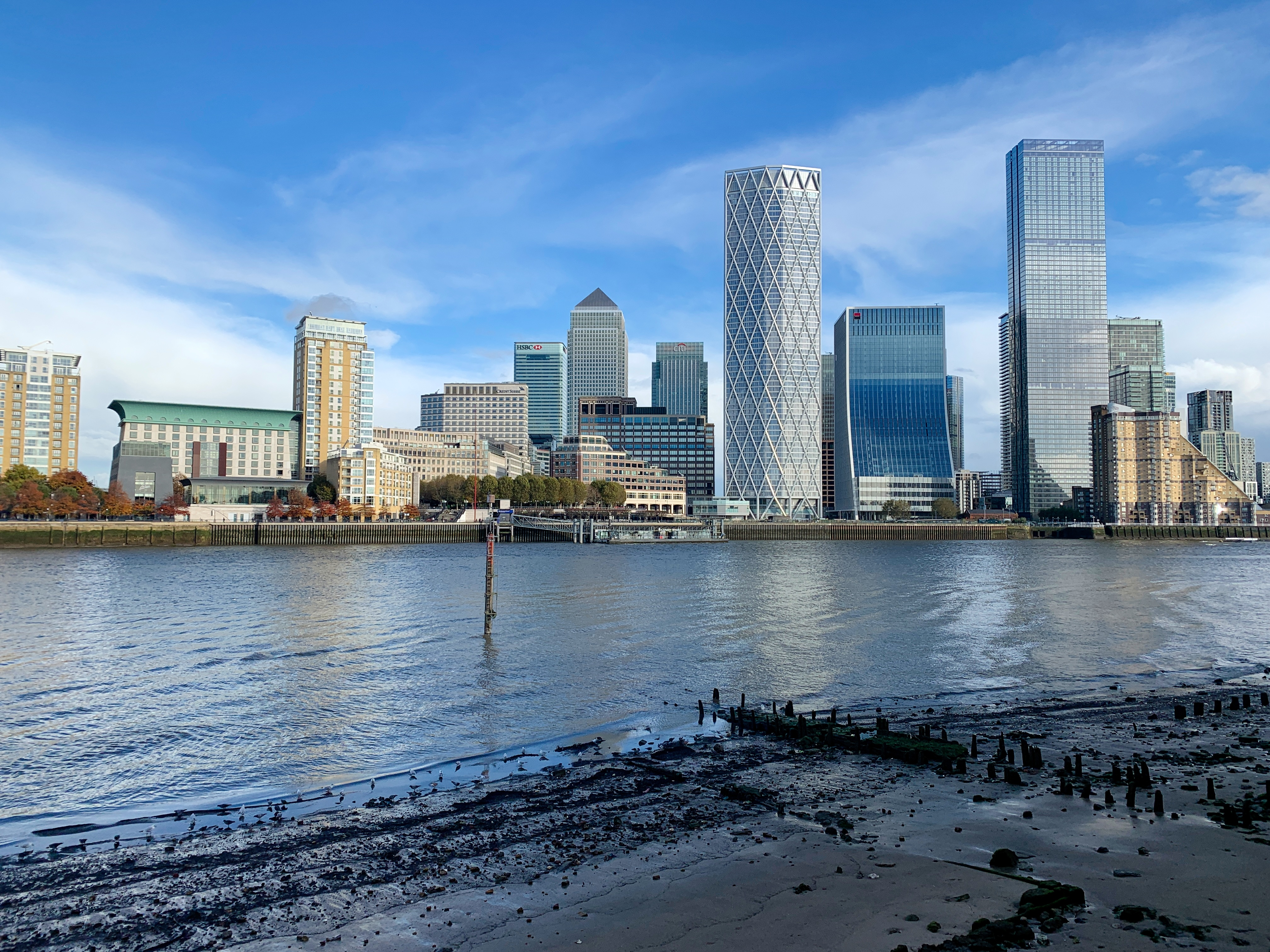
Canary Wharf seen from Rotherhithe. The proposed crossing would provide a link between Rotherhithe on the south side of the Thames and Canary Wharf on the north.

The Rotherhithe crossing is a proposed route for pedestrians and cyclists across the River Thames in London, England between Rotherhithe and Canary Wharf.

A bridge was first proposed at this location by Sustrans in 2008. The construction contract was awarded to Atkins in 2018 and a vertical lift bridge design was selected in 2019. The project was paused in June of that year for budgetary reasons, Transport for London (TfL) describing the construction of an opening bridge at the site as "complex" and unaffordable at that time. In July 2019 TfL made the decision to no longer progress a walking and cycling bridge between Rotherhithe and Canary Wharf due to costs and affordability, TfL has been carrying out further work to develop a more affordable proposal for a ferry crossing.

== Initial studies ==
The project is listed in the 2014 National Infrastructure Plan and has received support from the former Mayor of London, Boris Johnson, and by the Mayor of London, Sadiq Khan. The crossing is listed in the Transport for London 2015 consultation of new river crossings as "A pedestrian and cycle crossing linking Rotherhithe to Canary Wharf."

Following the publication of Sustrans' feasibility study into a crossing at this location in 2016, it was reported that TfL, who had been working with Sustrans to develop this project, had plans to run a design competition later in 2016. Instead, however, initial market testing took place, with the actual procurement process later indicated to take place in 2017.

TfL opened a public consultation on the crossing in November 2017. This sought public opinion on the preferred option of a moveable bridge, alongside alternatives including a tunnel but also an enhanced river ferry crossing. Public response to the consultation was in support of the crossing, with 93 per cent supporting proposals for any type of new crossing between Rotherhithe and Canary Wharf, and 85% supporting TfL's preferred option of a navigable bridge. A potential tunnel was perceived by the public as likely to have greater costs and environmental impact compared to a bridge, and a free ferry service seen as cheaper, though possibly less likely to encourage as many trips.

== Former bridge proposals ==
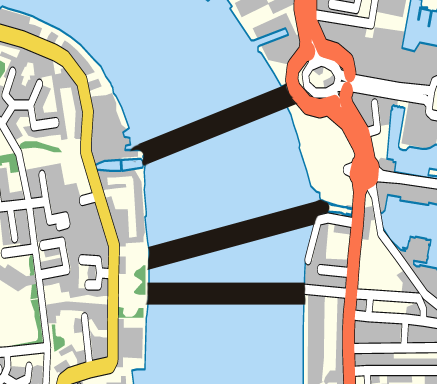
The three proposed sites for the former bridge plans in the March 2018 consultation: the top site would join Nelson Dock Pier to Westferry Circus; the middle site would connect Durand's Wharf with Impound Lock; the bottom site would join Durand's Wharf to West India Dock

The preferred location for the bridge identified in the feasibility study would be between the Impound Lock close to Cascades Tower on the northern (Canary Wharf) bank, and at Durand's Wharf park on the southern (Rotherhithe) bank. These would connect to Westferry Circus, Impound Lock or West India Dock. The Nelson Dock Pier to Westferry Circus connection received the most public support during the March 2018 consultation, with 79% being in favour, compared to 55% and 29% for the other links.

The Jubilee line runs directly underneath the proposed bridge, with the nearest stations at Canada Water and Canary Wharf.

The procurement process appointed Atkins to develop proposals for the crossing as part of an engineering and architectural contract. Proposals incorporated feedback from the November 2017 public consultation, before designs went out to further public consultation in summer 2018.

In March 2019, TfL selected a vertical lift bridge design for the crossing, that if built would be the world's largest of its type. The route on the east would start at Durand's Wharf park and end between the original north and central alignments of the original proposal on the western bank. As of April 2019 the bridge was expected to be the subject of a Transport and Works Act order by the end of that year, subject to consultation and further design work.

In June 2019, TfL announced that it would pause work on the bridge due to its midpoint cost estimate of £463m exceeding the £350m allocation in the TfL Business Plan. Nearly £10,000,000 was spent to date on the failed bridge attempt. Following the cancellation of the plans for a bridge river crossing, the chair of the London Assembly's Transport Committee, Navin Shah, asked how TfL had gotten its sums so wrong.

== Ferry proposal ==
TfL has proposed a clean, fast turn up and go ferry service with new specially designed boats and piers which will be as environmentally friendly as practicable.

As of 2019 there is a Thames Clippers ferry shuttle, the Canary Wharf – Rotherhithe Ferry, running a parallel course 250 metres north of the proposed bridge location. Work has begun looking at expanding this service and making it free of charge. In June 2019, Thames Clippers issued a statement welcoming the news to pause plans to build the bridge and announcing that they had been working in partnership with Beckett Rankine and Aus Yachts on a proposed electric, fully accessible ferry cross-river solution which could be delivered at a relatively minimal cost, and sooner than a bridge. Thames Clippers suggest that this could be replicated further east along the Thames where other crossings were required. The Rotherhithe proposal is for three electric self-docking ferries each with a capacity of 150 passengers of which 50 could be cyclists. With all three ferries operating the interval between sailings would be 4 minutes giving a carrying capacity of 2,250 passengers an hour in each direction.

In 2020 TfL was working with specialist consultants on designs for both the ferries, and pier locations. Sponsorship and subsidy options were also being considered, which could result in the service being free for customers to use. In late 2023 Thames Clippers won funding from the government for the project. BBC News reported that if approved by Southwark and Tower Hamlets' councils, the service was expected to operate from February 2025. However, in early 2024 the Mayor's office when asked about the plans said that TfL was not in a position to invest any significant capital costs in new schemes, such as the aforementioned possibility of others further east.

== See also ==
- Crossings of the River Thames
- List of bridges in London
