= List of crossings of the River Thames =

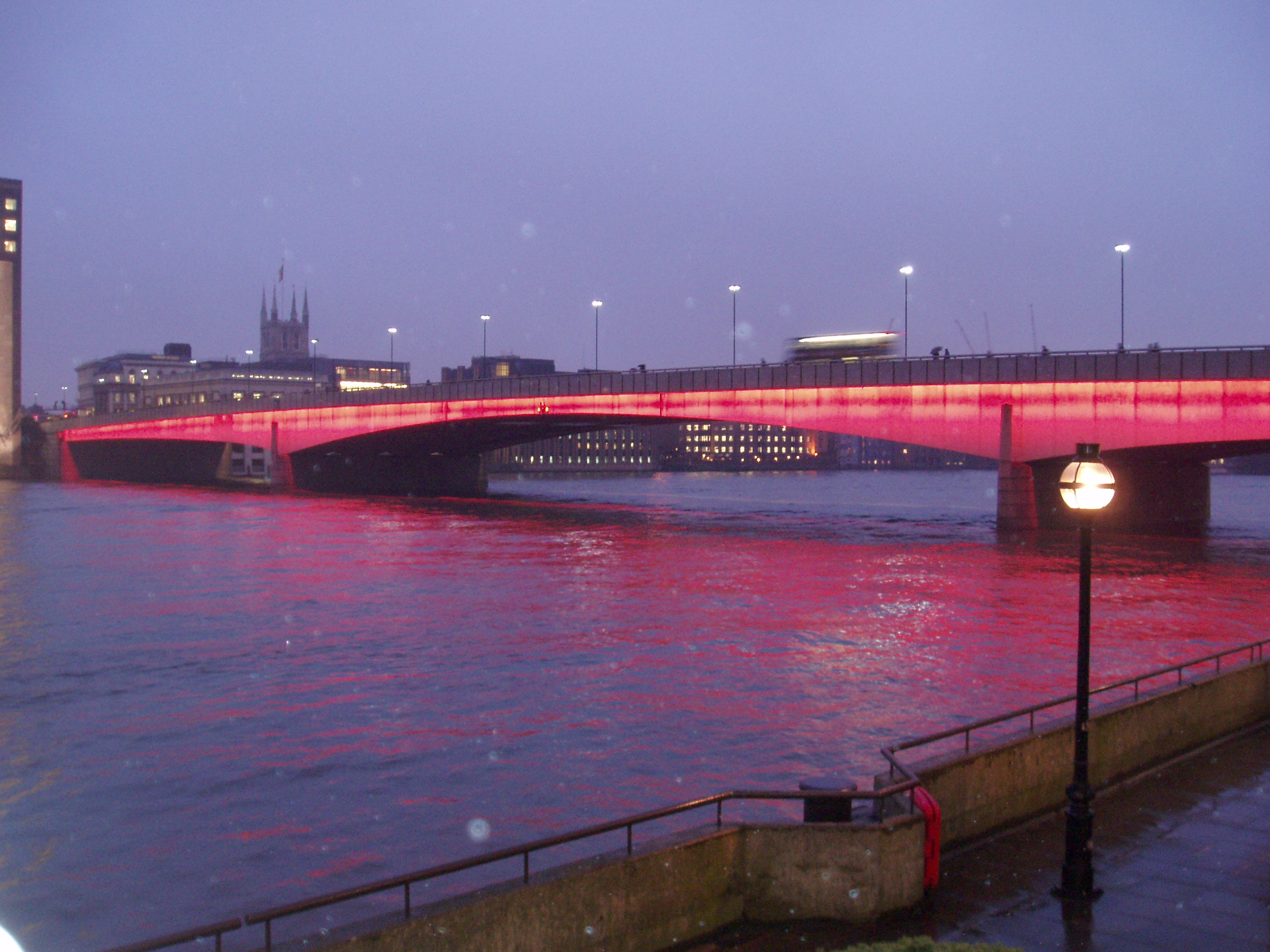
London Bridge, in central London

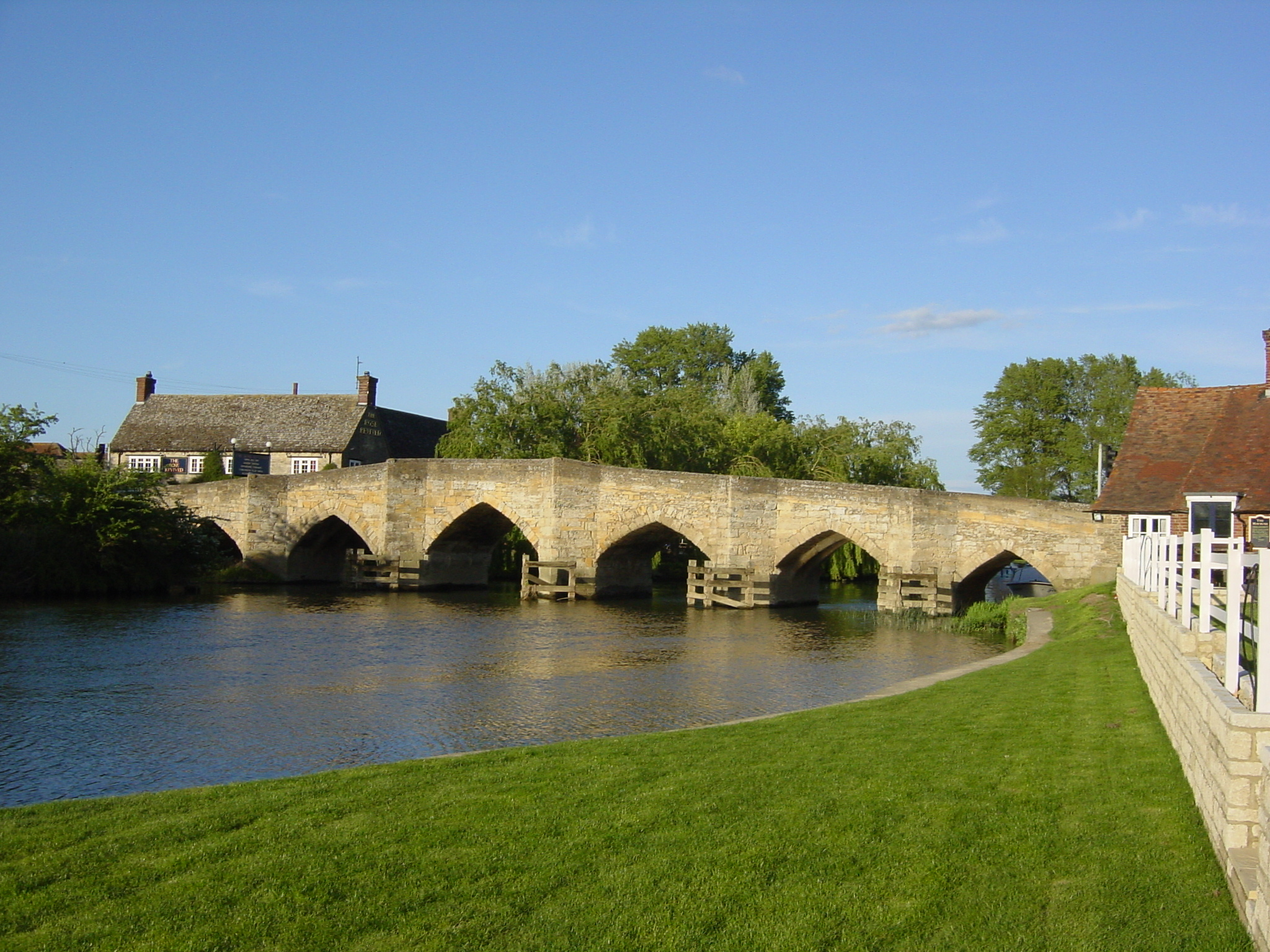
Newbridge, in rural Oxfordshire

The River Thames is the second-longest river in the United Kingdom, passes through the capital city, and has many crossings.

Counting every channel – such as by its islands linked to only one bank – it is crossed by over 300 bridges. If taking cuts – excavated channels – to be measurements of river, its 185-mile (298 km) course west of Tilbury has 27 tunnels, six public ferries, one cable car link, and one ford. From end to end, a channel of the Thames can be seen, mostly its main flow, which is passed over by 138 bridges. These are listed here with 2 former bridges and a seasonal festival bridge. Over 162 other bridges link to such places as typical or man-made islands or across an array of corollary and lesser side channels (backwaters), particularly in and around Oxford and the non-village channel of Ashton Keynes — these are not listed.

The river's lower estuary is shallow – but wide – and has no crossing east of Tilbury, the easternmost half as most broadly defined which even extends to the end of the rivers Medway and Crouch.

== Barrier and boundary ==
Until sufficient crossings were established, the river provided a formidable barrier for most of its course – in post-Roman Britain during the Dark Ages, Belgic-Celtic tribal lands and Anglo-Saxon kingdoms and subdivisions were defined by which side of the river they were on. In the latter's system of English counties continued by predominantly Norman England and for some centuries thereafter, the river formed a mutual limit of counties. After rising in Gloucestershire, the river flows between, on the north bank, the historic counties of Oxfordshire, Buckinghamshire, Middlesex and Essex; and on the south bank, the counties of Wiltshire, Berkshire, Surrey, and Kent. However the many permanent crossings that have been built over the centuries have changed the dynamics and made cross-river development and shared responsibilities more practicable.

In 1911, Caversham, on the north bank, was transferred into Berkshire. In 1965, with the creation of Greater London, the London Borough of Richmond upon Thames united areas formerly in Middlesex and Surrey; and at the same time two urban districts in Middlesex (united in 1974) became part of Surrey. Further changes in 1974 moved some of the boundaries away from the river. For example, much of the north west of Berkshire including Wallingford, Abingdon and Wantage became part of Oxfordshire, and some southern parts of Buckinghamshire became part of Berkshire, including Slough, Eton and Wraysbury. The number of county councils has fallen (and some others have dwindled in area) in England in favour of increased localisation. (Note: For example Berkshire County Council and Middlesex County Council were abolished and smaller authorities have been created in the counties adjoining the Thames, from the Borough of Swindon unitary authority to Medway Council on the Thames Estuary.)

Lessening these last changes, in the sports of rowing and skiffing, the river banks are referred to by their traditional county names, and in football and cricket the traditional counties also often persist. (Note: e.g. Buckinghamshire County Cricket Club, Middlesex County Football Association and Middlesex County Cricket Club)

== History of crossings ==
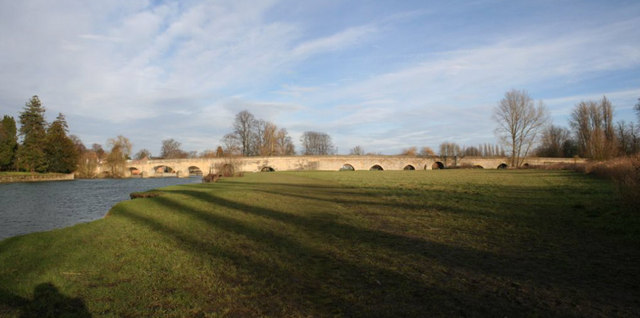
Wallingford Bridge (Oxfordshire)

The original crossings over the Thames would all have been fords- typically on gravel beds. Well known ones include Wallingford and Oxford, but it is likely that there was a prehistoric ford where the Romans built London Bridge. In the upper reaches of the Thames, the river depth was raised by dams and in the lower reaches it was raised by embankments, so gradually most fords were lost. At least one regular ford remains, at Duxford.

Many of the present road bridges over the river are on the sites of earlier fords, ferries and wooden structures. The earliest known major crossings of the Thames by the Romans were at London Bridge and Staines Bridge. At Folly Bridge in Oxford the remains of the Saxon forerunner can be seen, and medieval stone ones such as Wallingford, Newbridge in west Oxfordshire and Abingdon Bridges are still in use. In today's south-west London lies Kingston Bridge, which was the only crossing between London Bridge and Staines until the beginning of the 18th century and has been twice widened since its completion.

Proposals to build bridges for Lambeth/Westminster and Putney/Fulham in around 1670 were defeated by the Rulers of the Company of Watermen, since it would cut the trade of the then 60,000 rivermen plying ferry services and who were noted as a pool of naval reserves.

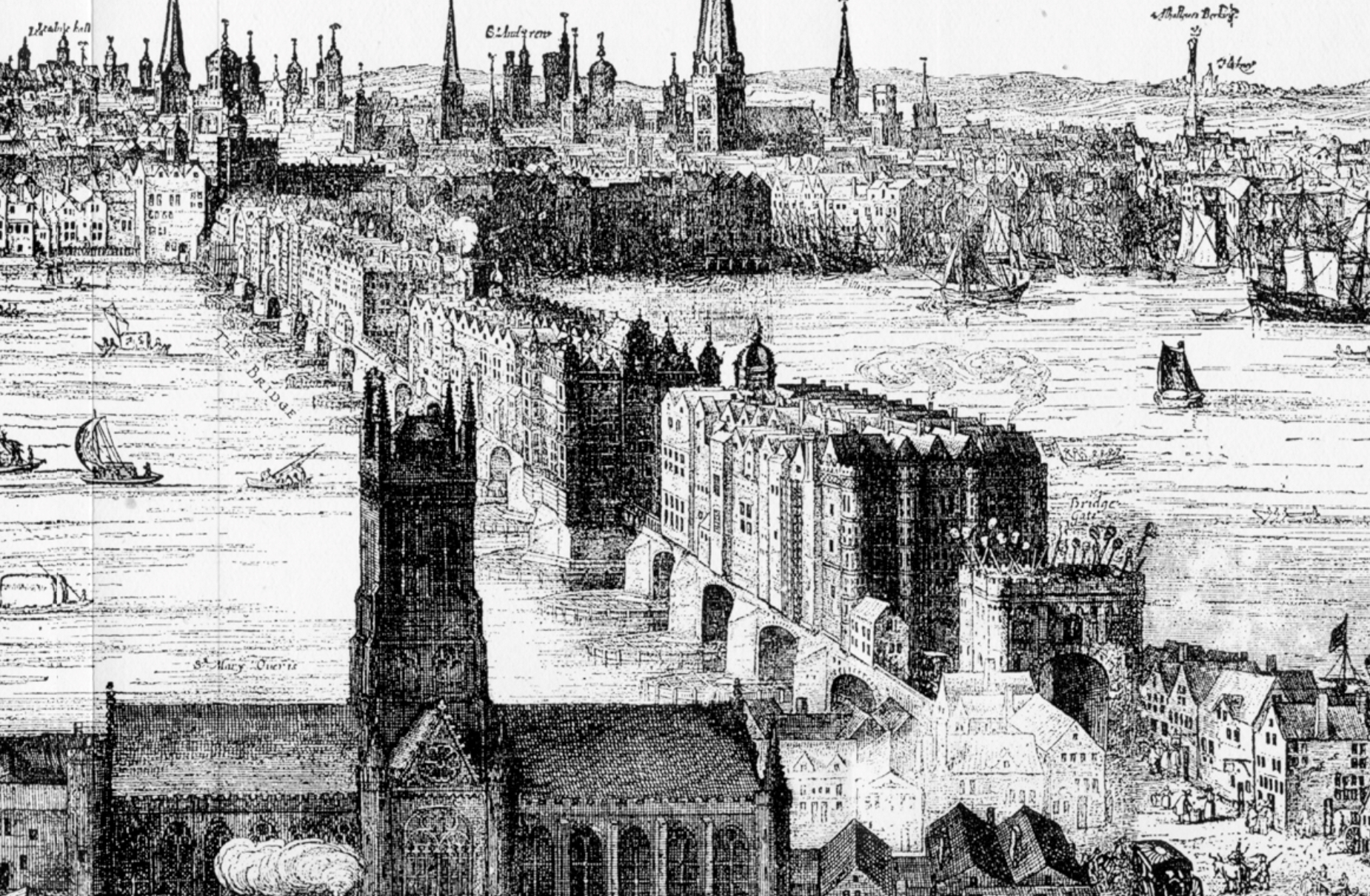
An engraving by Claes Van Visscher showing Old London Bridge in 1616

During the 18th century, many stone and brick instances were built – from new or to replace existing structures – in London and further up the river. These included Westminster, Putney, Datchet, Windsor and Sonning Bridges. Several central London road bridges were built in the 19th century, most conspicuously Tower Bridge, the only bascule bridge on the river, which enables some types of ocean-going ships to pass beneath it. The most recent road bridge sites are the bypasses at Isis Bridge and Marlow By-pass Bridge and for motorways such as the two for the M25: Queen Elizabeth II Bridge and M25 Runnymede Bridge.

The development of the railways resulted in a spate of bridge building in the 19th century, including Blackfriars and Charing Cross (Hungerford) Railway Bridges in central London, and the simple but majestic three, of grand arch design, by Isambard Kingdom Brunel at Maidenhead, Gatehampton and Moulsford.

The world's first underwater tunnel was the Thames Tunnel by Marc Brunel built in 1843, designed for horse-drawn carriages but used as a pedestrian route; since 1869 the tunnel has carried trains on the East London Line. The Tower Subway (1870) was briefly used for a railway; later came all the deep-level tube lines. Two road tunnels were built in East London at the end of the 19th century, the Blackwall Tunnel and the Rotherhithe Tunnel, and the latest tunnel is the Silvertown Tunnel.

Many footbridges were made across the weirs that were built on the non-tidal river, and some of these remained when the locks were built, such as at Benson Lock. Some, above Oxford, have survived when the weir was lost, as at Hart's Weir Footbridge. Around the year 2000 several were added, as part of the Thames Path or for the Millennium. These include Temple, Bloomers Hole, the Hungerford Footbridges and the Millennium Bridge in distinct, aesthetic but durable, forms.

Six ferries cross the river:

- The Woolwich Ferry is one of two in the Thames Gateway, linking the North and South Circular roads. The Gravesend–Tilbury Ferry further downstream is a pedestrian ferry only.
- Upstream of central London, the Hammertons Ferry is a passenger link between the tourist attractions of Ham House and Marble Hill House in Twickenham.
- Further upstream, the Hampton Ferry, the Sunbury Ferry, and the Shepperton to Weybridge Ferry are all pedestrian ferries to the west of London.

== Note on the listing ==
The list is from the estuary to the source. A few of the crossings listed are public foot bridges using walkways across lock gates and then bridges parallel to or on top of the associated weir(s) to the non-lock-associated bank. Most of the other locks on the River Thames also have walkways across their lock gates and/or weirs, but these do not completely cross the river, or are restricted to authorised personnel only, and are therefore not listed.

In addition to ferry services which directly cross the river, and are listed here, there are also other boat services running along the river. Whilst their main purpose is not to carry people across the river, they may provide incidental crossing facilities, although usually not to points facing each other. Such services are not listed.

== North Sea to London ==
Crossing	Type	Coordinates	Opened	Notes	Photo
Thames Cable Tunnel	Utility tunnel		1970	Carries two 400kV circuits; accessible by authorised personnel only. To be replaced by the Grain to Tilbury cable tunnel.	
Gravesend–Tilbury Ferry	Ferry route		1571 or before	Foot/bicycle ferry. Ferry service discontinued March 2024.	
400 kV Thames Crossing	Overhead power line crossing		1965	Overhead power line 623 ft tall crossing the Thames at Swanscombe and Grays	
High Speed 1 tunnels	Railway tunnel		2007	Two 2.5 km tunnels, 7.15 m internal diameter, between West Thurrock (Essex) and Swanscombe (Kent)	
Queen Elizabeth II Bridge	Cable-stayed bridge, road bridge		30 Oct 1991	Cable-stayed bridge – the southbound element of the Dartford Crossing	
Dartford Tunnel (eastern)	Road tunnel		May 1980		
Dartford Tunnel (western)	Road tunnel		18 Nov 1963		
Dartford Cable Tunnel	Utility tunnel		2005	Carrying electrical cable; accessible by authorised personnel only	

=== Under construction ===
- The Grain to Tilbury cable tunnel is a utility tunnel being built by National Grid to replace the Thames Cable Tunnel, which has reached the end of its service life. Construction began in 2025.
- The Lower Thames Crossing tunnels are a pair of road tunnels being built close to the Thames Cable Tunnel. Construction began 2026, and the crossing is scheduled to open in 'the early to mid-2030s'.

=== Proposed ===
- KenEx tunnel is a proposed tunnel to carry trams between Kent and Essex, as part of a proposed KenEx Transit network.

== East London ==
Crossing	Type	Coordinates	Opened	Notes	Photo
Barking cable tunnel	Utility tunnel		1920s	Carries four 33 kV electricity circuits from Barking substation to Sewell Road substation, Thamesmead	
Docklands Light Railway tunnel	Railway tunnel		2009	Between King George V and Woolwich Arsenal stations	
Crossrail tunnels	Railway tunnel		2014	Completed in 2014, part of the Elizabeth line, opened to the public in 2022.	
Woolwich foot tunnel	Pedestrian tunnel		26 Oct 1912		
Woolwich Ferry	Ferry route		23 Mar 1889		
Thames Barrier	Flood barrier		1984	Service tunnel accessible by authorised personnel only	
Silvertown Tunnel	Road tunnel		7 Apr 2025		
London cable car	Gondola lift, public transport route		28 Jun 2012		
Millennium Dome cable tunnel	Utility tunnel		1999	Accessible by authorised personnel only	
Jubilee line tunnels	Railway tunnel		1999	Between North Greenwich and Canning Town stations.	
Blackwall Tunnel (eastern)	Road tunnel		2 Aug 1967	For southbound vehicular traffic only	
Blackwall Tunnel (western)	Road tunnel		22 May 1897	For northbound vehicular traffic only	
Isle of Dogs Jubilee line tunnels	Railway tunnel		1999	Between Canary Wharf and North Greenwich stations.	
Greenwich foot tunnel	Pedestrian tunnel		1899		
Docklands Light Railway tunnel	Railway tunnel		1999	Between Island Gardens and Cutty Sark stations.	
Deptford cable tunnel	Utility tunnel			Carries 30 11 kV electricity circuits	
Jubilee line tunnels	Railway tunnel		1999	Between Canada Water and Canary Wharf stations.	
Canary Wharf – Rotherhithe Ferry	Ferry route				
Rotherhithe Tunnel	Road tunnel, pedestrian tunnel		12 Jun 1908	Single carriageway in each direction, with footways on each side. Built originally for horse-drawn carriages. Pedestrians, riders, cyclists are permitted, but advised to use alternatives due to fumes and speed.	
Thames Tunnel	Railway tunnel		1843	The world's first underwater tunnel, linking Wapping to Rotherhithe. Originally designed as a road tunnel for horse-drawn traffic, the necessary access ramps were never built and it was opened as a pedestrian tunnel. It was converted to a rail tunnel, reopening in 1869 and becoming part of the London Overground network in 2010.	
New Cross to Finsbury Market Cable Tunnel	Utility tunnel	,	2017	Carries three 132 kV electricity circuits	

=== Proposed ===
- The Belvedere Crossing, a bridge between Belvedere and Rainham.
- The Gallions Reach Crossing has been proposed as a ferry, bridge, or tunnel between Beckton and Thamesmead.
- An extension of the Docklands Light Railway across the river to Thamesmead is proposed.
- The Rotherhithe crossing, a pedestrian and cycle crossing between Rotherhithe and Canary Wharf, was originally proposed as a bridge, but Transport for London abandoned plans for a bridge in 2019, and has since explored establishing a ferry service instead.

== Central London ==
Crossing	Type	Coordinates	Opened	Notes	Photo
Tower Bridge	Bascule bridge, steel bridge, road bridge, suspension bridge, gothic revival bridge		1886		
Tower Subway	Utility tunnel, tube railway (until Dec 1870), pedestrian tunnel (from Dec 1870)		2 Aug 1870	Formerly an underground railway – now used for water mains and telephone cables and accessible only by authorised personnel	
Northern Line (Bank branch) tunnels	Railway tunnel		1900	Between London Bridge and Bank	
London Bridge	Road bridge, prestressed concrete bridge, arch bridge, box girder bridge		16 Mar 1973	Other bridges have stood on or near this site since around AD 50	
City & South London Railway tunnels	Railway tunnel		1890	This railway's original crossing of the river between Borough and King William Street; abandoned in 1900 when the Northern line City branch tunnels were opened on a new alignment	
Cannon Street Railway Bridge	Girder bridge, steel bridge, railway bridge		1883		
Southwark Bridge	Steel bridge, road bridge, arch bridge		1921		
Millennium Bridge	Suspension bridge, footbridge		10 Jun 2000		
Bankside Cable Tunnel	Utility tunnel		1940s	East of Blackfriars rail bridge, 132 kV and 33 kV electricity circuits	
Blackfriars Railway Bridge	Steel bridge, arch bridge, truss bridge, railway bridge		1886		
Blackfriars Bridge	Steel bridge, road bridge, arch bridge, tram bridge (from 1909, until Jul 1952)		1869		
Waterloo & City line tunnels	Railway tunnel		1898	Between Waterloo and Bank	
Waterloo Bridge	box girder bridge, girder bridge, road bridge, Zone 3 A road		1945, 18 Jun 1817		
Northern line (Charing Cross branch) tunnels	Railway tunnel		1926	Between Waterloo and Embankment	
Hungerford Bridge and Golden Jubilee Bridges	Steel bridge, footbridge, railway bridge, cable-stayed bridge		1845	Rail bridge incorporating newer pedestrian paths on either side	
Bakerloo line tunnels	Railway tunnel		1906	Between Waterloo and Embankment	
Bankside–Charing Cross cable tunnel	Utility tunnel			Underneath Hungerford Bridge	
Jubilee Line Extension tunnels	Railway tunnel		1999	Between Waterloo and Westminster	
Westminster Bridge	Road bridge, arch bridge, tram bridge (from 1909, until Jul 1952)		24 May 1862, 18 Nov 1750		
Lambeth Bridge	Road bridge, arch bridge		12 May 1932		
Vauxhall Bridge	Deck arch bridge, steel bridge, road bridge, tram bridge (from 1906, until Jan 1952)		1816		
Victoria line tunnels	Railway tunnel		1971	Between Vauxhall and Pimlico	
Wimbledon – Pimlico cable tunnel	Utility tunnel		1996	Electricity cables	
Battersea steam tunnel	Utility tunnel		20th century	Between Battersea and Pimlico is a single tunnel carrying four pipes, two 30" Thames Water mains and two 11" pipes feeding the Pimlico District Heating system, originally powered by Battersea Power Station.	
Battersea exhaust tunnels	Utility tunnel		1920s	Between Battersea and either side of Victoria are two tunnels. Tunnels are labelled 'A' and 'B'; A splits further to become 'C' under Ranelagh Gardens.	
Grosvenor Bridge	Steel bridge, railway bridge, arch bridge		1860	Also known as Victoria Railway Bridge	

=== Former ===
- At least three Emergency Thames Bridges were erected as a precaution against destructions during World War II. The first was built from Victoria Embankment to County Hall, London in 1942 before being demolished in 1948. Between the same years stood another, between Millbank outside the Tate Britain and Lambeth. A third bridge spanned the Thames between Chelsea Battersea Park. After it was dismantled in the 1950s, it was transported to Uganda and repurposed as a bridge over the Kazinga Channel.

=== Planned ===
- Nine Elms-Pimlico cycle and pedestrian bridge

== South West London ==
Crossing	Type	Co-ordinates	Date opened	Notes	Photo
Chelsea Bridge	Road bridge, self-anchored suspension bridge		6 May 1937		
Albert Bridge	Suspension bridge, beam bridge, Ordish–Lefeuvre system, steel bridge, road bridge		1873		
Battersea Bridge	Arch bridge, iron bridge, tram bridge (from 1909, until 1950)		21 Jul 1890	Replaced an earlier bridge, opened in 1771.	
Battersea Railway Bridge	Steel bridge, arch bridge, railway bridge		2 Mar 1863	West London Line. Also called the Cremorne Bridge.	
Wandsworth Bridge	Cantilever bridge, steel bridge, road bridge		25 Sep 1940		
London Power Tunnels	Utility tunnel	51°27′47″N 0°11′35″W	2018, 2011	Wimbledon – Kensal Green	
Fulham Railway Bridge	Railway bridge, footbridge, truss bridge		3 Jun 1889		
Putney Bridge	Stone bridge, road bridge, tram bridge (from 1909, until 1935), arch bridge		1729	Replaced an earlier bridge, known as Fulham Bridge, opened in 1729. This is the downstream limit of the Thames towpath.	
Hammersmith Bridge	Suspension bridge, road bridge		1827	As of April 2025, Hammersmith Bridge reopened to pedestrians and cyclists after having been closed while structural issues were remedied.	
Barnes Railway Bridge	Truss arch bridge, steel bridge, arch bridge, railway bridge, footbridge		1895		
Chiswick Bridge	Road bridge, reinforced concrete bridge, arch bridge		3 Jul 1933		
Kew Railway Bridge	Railway bridge, truss bridge, girder bridge		1 Jan 1869		
Kew Bridge	arch bridge, Stone bridge, road bridge		1903		
Richmond Lock and Footbridge	footbridge, arch bridge, Lock		1894		
Twickenham Bridge	Arch bridge, road bridge		3 Jul 1933		
Richmond Railway Bridge	Steel bridge, arch bridge, railway bridge		1848		
Richmond Bridge	Bridge		1777		
Hammerton's Ferry	Ferry route		1909	From Marble Hill House, Twickenham to Ham House, Ham.	
Teddington Lock Footbridges	Iron bridge, suspension bridge, girder bridge, footbridge		1889	The Thames Path crosses these bridges; downstream there are paths on both sides of the river until the Greenwich foot tunnel.	
Kingston Railway Bridge	Arch bridge, railway bridge		1863		
Kingston Bridge	Stone bridge, road bridge, arch bridge, toll bridge (until Mar 1870)		17 Jul 1828	The Thames Path crosses this bridge.	
Hampton Court Bridge	Concrete bridge, steel bridge, road bridge, arch bridge		1933	From Hampton Court to East Molesey. The Thames Path crosses this bridge.	
Hampton Ferry	Ferry route		1519	From Hampton to Hurst Park, East Molesey.	

=== Planned ===
- Diamond Jubilee Footbridge, a pedestrian bridge adjacent to Battersea Railway Bridge, granted planning permission in 2013.

== London to Windsor ==
Crossing	Type	Co-ordinates	Date opened	Notes	Photo
Sunbury Ferry	Ferry route		2019	April to November	
Walton Bridge	Road bridge		2013		
Shepperton to Weybridge Ferry	Passenger ferry		16th century	The only ferry on any form of the Thames Path – and the most upstream	
Chertsey Bridge	Road bridge		1785		
M3 Chertsey Bridge	Highway bridge		1971	Carrying the M3 motorway	
Staines Railway Bridge	Railway bridge		1856	Built by the London and South Western Railway. Carries the Waterloo to Reading Line.	
Staines Bridge	Road bridge		1832	Bridges continuously recorded near this site since 1228.	
Runnymede Bridge	Highway bridge		1961	Carrying the M25 motorway and, on the older part of the bridge, the A30; widened in 1983 and 2005.	
Albert Bridge	Road bridge		1927	Replaced a cast-iron bridge built in 1850–51.	
Victoria Bridge	Road bridge		1967	Replacing an 1851 bridge.	
Black Potts Railway Bridge	Railway bridge		1850		
Windsor Bridge	Footbridge (from 1970), bicycle bridge		1 Jun 1824	Bridges recorded on this site since 1172. Pedestrian/cycle bridge since 1970.	
Windsor Railway Bridge	Railway bridge		1849		
Queen Elizabeth Bridge	Road bridge		1966		

=== Former ===
- The Datchet Bridge, built in 1707, was demolished in 1848, and replaced by the Albert and Victoria bridges.

== Windsor to Reading ==
Crossing	Type	Co-ordinates	Date opened	Notes	Image
Summerleaze Footbridge	Wooden bridge, footbridge		1992		
M4 Thames Bridge	Highway bridge		1961	Carrying the M4 Motorway; incorporates a footbridge	
Maidenhead Railway Bridge	Railway bridge		1838	Carrying the Great Western Main Line.	
Maidenhead Bridge	Bridge		1777	Bridge recorded 1280.	
Taplow Bridge	Footbridge		2018	Newest Thames crossing.	
Cookham Bridge	Road bridge		1867		
Bourne End Railway Bridge	Railway bridge, footbridge		1895	Footbridge added onto the rail bridge specifically for the Thames Path.	
Marlow By-pass Bridge	Road bridge		1972	Carries the A404 road between Maidenhead and High Wycombe.	
Marlow Bridge	Road bridge		1832	Replaced bridge built in 1530.	
Temple Footbridge	Footbridge		1989	Footbridge built in 1989 specifically for the Thames Path; closed 2023 on safety grounds.	
Hambleden Lock	Lock, footbridge		1884		
Henley Bridge	Road bridge		1786	Earlier bridge dates from at least 1232.	
Shiplake Railway Bridge	Railway bridge		1897		
Sonning Bridge	Road bridge		1775	Earlier bridge recorded 1530 and one in 1125.	
Sonning Backwater Bridges	Road bridge		1986		
Caversham Lock and Weir	Lock, footbridge, weir		1875		
Reading Bridge	Road bridge		1923		
Christchurch Bridge	Footbridge, bicycle bridge, cable-stayed bridge		30 Sep 2015		
Caversham Bridge	Road bridge		1926	Earliest bridge on site recorded in 1231.	

=== Former ===
- A footbridge was built in 2012, for the London Olympics, to enable spectators of the rowing events held at Dorney Lake to gain access from Windsor Racecourse. It was removed after the Olympics.

== Reading to Oxford ==
Crossing	Type	Co-ordinates	Date opened	Notes	Photo
Reading Festival bridge	Footbridge		2008	Temporarily erected each year on permanent footings for the period of the annual Reading Festival; accessible to festival ticket-holders and other authorised personnel only	
Whitchurch Bridge	Road bridge		1902	Toll bridge	
Gatehampton Railway Bridge	Arch bridge, railway bridge		1838		
Goring and Streatley Bridge	Road bridge		1923		
Moulsford Railway Bridge	Arch bridge, railway viaduct		1839		
Winterbrook Bridge	Road bridge		1993		
Wallingford Bridge	Road bridge		1809	Bridge recorded 1141.	
Benson Lock	Lock, footbridge				
Shillingford Bridge	Road bridge		1827	Replaced bridge built 1763.	
Little Wittenham Bridge	Footbridge		1870		
Day's Lock	Lock, footbridge				
Clifton Hampden Bridge	Road bridge		1867		
Appleford Railway Bridge	Railway bridge		1927		
Sutton Bridge	Road bridge		1807		
Sutton Pools footbridges	Footbridge			Linking four islands in the river course	
Culham Cut Bridge	Bridge			A bridge across the weir on the Culham Cut, west of Culham Lock	
Culham Lock	Lock, footbridge			Other bridges cross the main river channel	
Abingdon Bridge	Arch bridge, road bridge		1416		
Abingdon Lock	Lock, footbridge				
Nuneham Viaduct	Railway bridge, bowstring arch truss bridge		1929		
Sandford Lock	Lock, footbridge				
Kennington Railway Bridge	Railway bridge		1923		
Isis Bridge	Road bridge		1965		
Iffley Lock	Lock, footbridge				
Donnington Bridge	Road bridge		1962		
Folly Bridge	Deck arch bridge		1827	Stone bridge built 1085	
Grandpont Bridge	Footbridge		1930s		
Gasworks Bridge	Footbridge		1886	Originally built to carry a rail line to the Oxford Gasworks, which closed in 1960.	
Osney Rail Bridge	Railway bridge		1850, 1887	Two adjacent bridges	
Osney Bridge	Road bridge		1889		

=== Planned ===
- Oxpens River Bridge (between Gasworks and Osney Rail Bridges in Oxford, 51°44'50.2"N 1°15'56.0"W) a footbridge, for completion in 2025.

== Oxford to Cricklade ==
Crossing	Type	Co-ordinates	Date opened	Notes	Photo
Medley Footbridge	Footbridge		1865	Also called Rainbow footbridge.	
Tank footbridge	Footbridge		Sep 1947		
Godstow Bridge	Road bridge		1792	A previous bridge was held by the Royalists in 1645.	
A34 Road Bridge	Road bridge		1961		
King's Lock	Lock, footbridge		1928		
Eynsham Lock	Lock, footbridge		1928	Permissive	
Swinford Toll Bridge	Road bridge		1769		
Pinkhill Lock	Lock, footbridge		1791		
Hart's Weir Footbridge	Footbridge		1879		
New Bridge	Road bridge		1250		
Duxford ford	Ford			The ford crosses the original river channel to an island formed on its other side by the Shifford Lock Cut, which is crossed by a footbridge. There is no footbridge across the original river channel, which must be forded by pedestrians.	
Shifford Lock	Lock, footbridge				
Tenfoot Bridge	Footbridge		1869		
Tadpole Bridge	Road bridge		1784		
Rushey Lock	Lock, footbridge		1790		
Old Man's Bridge	Footbridge		1894		
Radcot Bridge	Road bridge		1787		
Eaton Footbridge	Footbridge		1936		
Buscot Lock	Lock, footbridge		1790		
Bloomers Hole Footbridge	Footbridge		2000	Built in 2000 for the Thames Path.	
St. John's Bridge	Road bridge		1886		
Halfpenny Bridge	Road bridge		1792	The upstream limit of the navigable Thames.	
Inglesham Footbridge	Footbridge		1996	The original towpath extends upstream to this point, by the connection with the now disused Thames and Severn Canal.	
Hannington Bridge	Road bridge		1841		
Castle Eaton Bridge	Road bridge		1893		
Water Eaton House Bridge	Footbridge			Described in 1896 as a small occupation bridge for pedestrians and cattle.	
Eysey Footbridge	Footbridge				
A419 Road Bridge	Road bridge		1988		
Abingdon Court Lane Bridge	Road bridge		20th century	For sewage works & cricket club: accessible to authorised personnel only.	
Cricklade Town Bridge	Road bridge		1852		

== Cricklade to the source ==
Not all of the bridges above Cricklade are listed below. For example, there are a number of small agricultural bridges allowing access between fields, and bridges to properties in Ashton Keynes that are not mentioned.

Crossing	Type	Co-ordinates	Date opened	Notes	Photo
Aqueduct footings footbridge	Footbridge, navigable aqueduct ()			Site of a former aqueduct carrying the North Wilts Canal over the Thames.	
Midland and South Western Junction Railway bridge	Railway bridge (), footbridge			Formerly a bridge for the Midland and South Western Junction Railway.	
Stones Lane footbridge	Footbridge			Footbridge at Hailstone House.	
Manor Farm bridge	Road bridge			North of Manor Farm, Waterhay.	
Brook Farm bridge	Road bridge			North of Brook Farm, Waterhay.	
Waterhay bridge	Road bridge				
Unnamed footbridge	Footbridge			The footbridge and a ford carry a bridlepath over the river, just outside Ashton Keynes.	
Bridge on High Road	Road bridge			Bridge on High Road, Ashton Keynes	
Bridge on The Derry	Road bridge			Bridge on The Derry, Ashton Keynes	
Bridge on Gosditch, Ashton Keynes	Road bridge	51°38′42″N 1°56′7″W			
Bridge on Church Walk, Ashton Keynes	Road bridge	51°38′48″N 1°56′10″W			
Bridge on Church Lane, Ashton Keynes	Road bridge	51°38′48″N 1°56′14″W			
Bridge on B4696, Ashton Keynes	Road bridge	51°38′46″N 1°56′31″W			
Bridges	Road bridge and pedestrian bridge	51°38′46″N 1°56′56″W			
Bridge	Road bridge	51°38′43″N 1°57′38″W			
Footbridge	Pedestrian bridge	51°38′48″N 1°57′46″W			
Bridge	Road bridge	51°38′51″N 1°57′58″W			
Bridge	Road bridge	51°38′52″N 1°58′2″W			
Bridge	Road bridge	51°38′54″N 1°58′8″W			
Footbridge	Pedestrian bridge	51°38′59″N 1°58′17″W			
Bridge	Road bridge	51°39′2″N 1°58′24″W			
Neigh Bridge	Road bridge	51°39′6″N 1°58′29″W			
Bridge south of Ewen	Road bridge	51°40′27″N 1°59′44″W			
Parker's Bridge, Ewen	Road bridge	51°40′31″N 2°0′25″W			
A429 Road Bridge	Road bridge	51°40′47″N 2°0′53″W		Demolished bridge on the currently closed Cirencester Branch Line ran over the road. Part of the Beeching Axe legacy.	
A433 Road Bridge, Fosse Way Roman Road	Road bridge	51°41′24″N 2°1′21″W		At Thames Head	

The river splits as it passes through Ashton Keynes. An alternative route to that listed above crosses High Bridge at 51°38′13″N 1°55′46″W and Three Bridges at 51°38′18″N 1°56′21″W.

== See also ==
- Islands in the River Thames
- Locks and weirs on the River Thames
- List of bridges in London
- London River Services
- Thames Path
- Tunnels underneath the River Thames
