= Julia Ratcliffe (engineer) =

British structural engineer

Julia Ratcliffe FIStructE Hon FRIBA

Personal details
- Born: 1971 (age 54–55)
- Occupation: Structural engineer

Julia Ratcliffe (born 1971) is a British structural engineer and professional engineer licensed in Connecticut, USA. She was a Director of Expedition Engineering 2011-2018 and then founded Scale Consulting. Julia was the first to be selected for a series of profiles of notable engineers in The Structural Engineer and was project director of the Institution of Structural Engineers new headquarters building. She is a Design Council Built Environment Expert (BEE) and a member of the London Borough of Havering Quality Review Panel. Ratcliffe has also been a judge for the British Constructional Steelwork Association's Structural Steel Design Awards, and the Institution of Structural Engineers International Awards. She advised on the construction of shelters in Pakistan following the 2005 Kashmir earthquake funded by James Caan and is cited in his autobiography. In 2022, Ratcliffe was awarded an Honorary Fellowship of the Royal Institute of British Architects for her services to architecture.
