= Shifford Lock =

Lock on the River Thames, England

Coordinates: 51.70652°N 1.46595°W

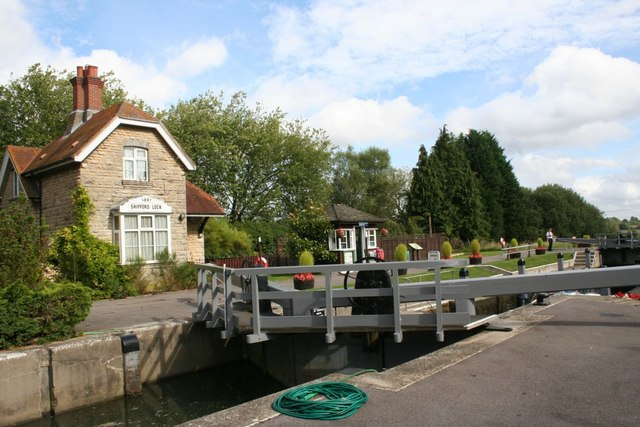
- Waterway: River Thames
- County: Oxfordshire
- Maintained by: Environment Agency
- Operation: Manual
- First built: 1898
- Length: 34.64 m (113 ft 8 in)
- Width: 4.59 m (15 ft 1 in)
- Fall: 2.23 m (7 ft 4 in)
- Above sea level: 210'
- Distance to Teddington Lock: 110 miles

Shifford Lock is a lock on the River Thames in England. It is in the centre of a triangle formed by the small villages of Shifford, Duxford and Chimney in Oxfordshire. It is at the start of a navigation cut built with the lock by the Thames Conservancy in 1898. This was the only new lock built on the non-tidal Thames in the era of falling revenue after the Thames Conservancy took over responsibilities of the Thames Navigation Commission. It replaced a flash lock in a weir about 3/4 mile (1.2 km) downstream.

There is a small weir beside the lock and a larger weir on the old course of the river upstream at the top of the lock cut.

== History ==
The original flash lock was in a weir close to the entrance to Great Brook. This was removed between 1829 and 1853, and there were later complaints about the lack of draught in the river. Discussion of the possibility of the new lock only began in 1896 and two years later it was open. The lock cut was based on a pre-existing side channel which was considerably widened. After the lock was built, the towpath around the old navigation channel fell into disuse. There were moves to have it called Chimney Lock, but the name Shifford Lock was adopted.

== Access to the lock ==
The lock can be reached on foot from Chimney about a mile away.

== Reach above the lock ==
The cut is about a mile long, and halfway along is the Shifford Cut Footbridge. The cut rejoins the old course of the river and continues past Chimney. Further along the reach there is another wooden footbridge, Tenfoot Bridge and after that is Tadpole Bridge.

The Thames Path starts on the south bank of the cut, crosses over on Shifford Cut Footbridge and then continues on the north bank beyond the cut to Rushey Lock.

== See also ==
- Locks on the River Thames
- Crossings of the River Thames

Next crossing upstream	River Thames	Next crossing downstream
Tenfoot Bridge	Shifford Lock	Newbridge
Next lock upstream	River Thames	Next lock downstream
Rushey Lock; 6.92 km (4.30 mi)	Shifford Lock; Grid reference: SP370010	Northmoor Lock; 7.63 km (4.74 mi)
