= Expedition Engineering =

British structural engineering company

- Type: Privately-held company
- Industry: Design, Engineering, Education
- Founded: 1999
- Founder: Prof. Chris Wise; Seán Walsh; Chris Smith
- Headquarters: London, England
- Key people: Chris Wise (Director); Seán Walsh (Director); Andrew Weir (Director); Ed McCann (Director); Judith Sykes (Director); Alistair Lenczner (Director); Julia Ratcliffe (Director 2011-2018)
- Parent: The Useful Simple Trust
- Website: www.expedition.uk.com

Expedition Engineering is a London-based consulting firm, delivering structural engineering services.

== History ==
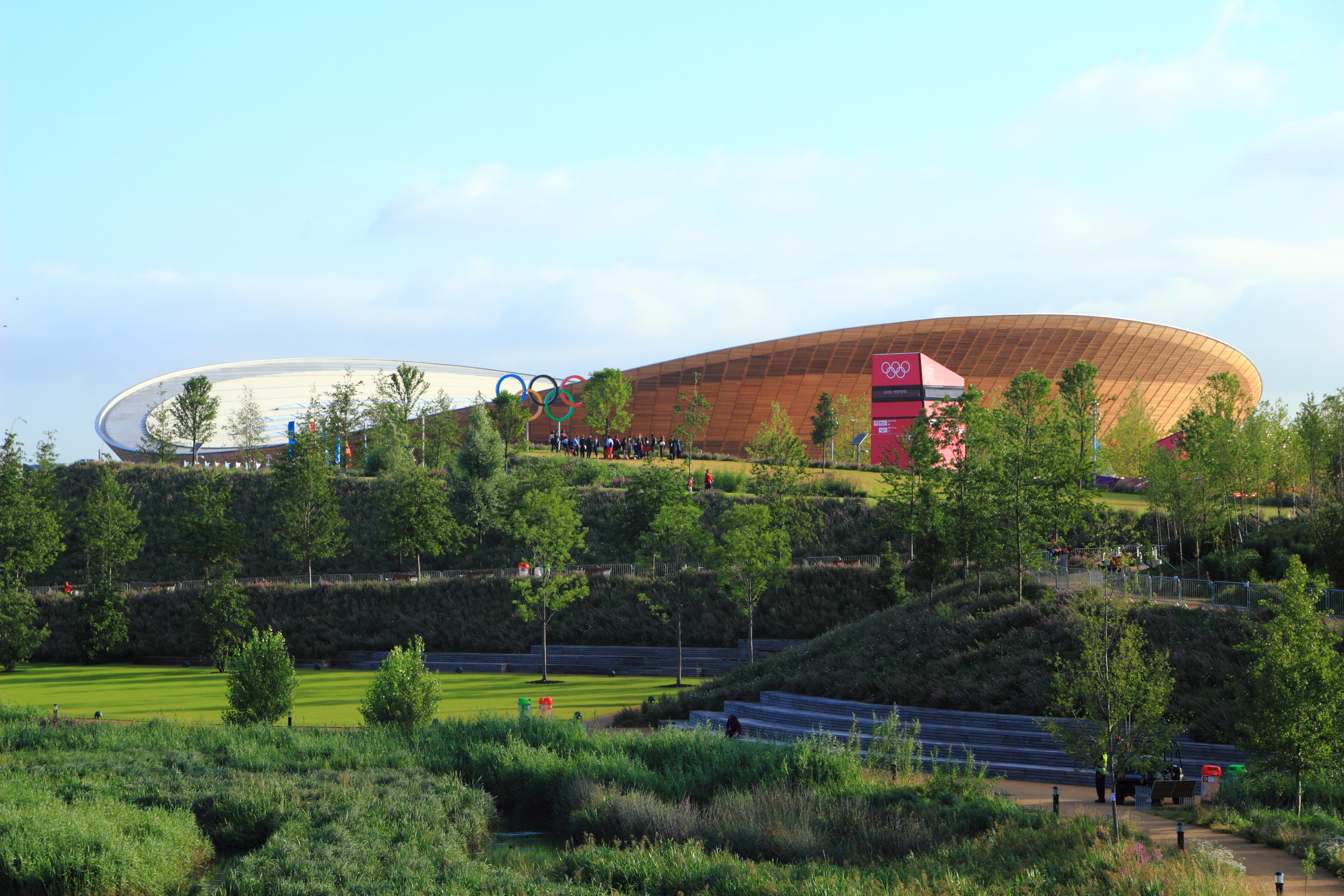
London 2012 Velodrome

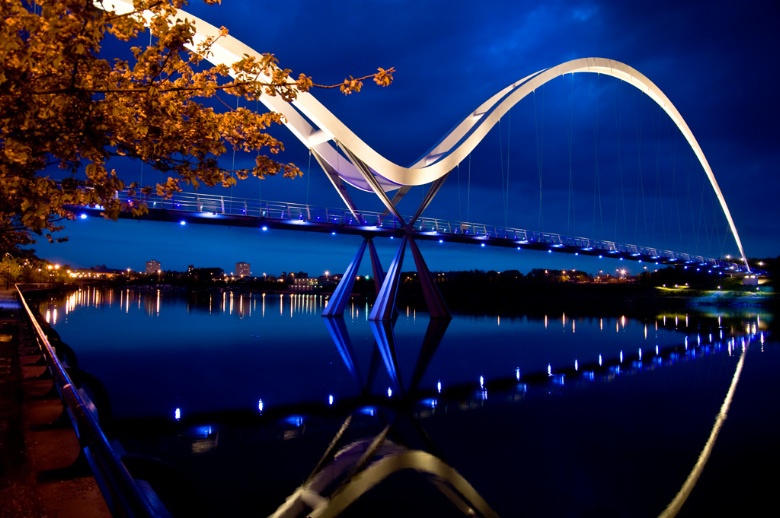
Infinity Bridge, Stockton-on-Tees

Expedition Engineering was founded in 1999 by Professor Chris Wise (engineer for the Millennium Bridge, London) and Seán Walsh, both former employees at Arup.

On 2 October 2008, Expedition's ownership was restructured, passing to an Employee Benefit Trust called the Useful Simple Trust. The Useful Simple Trust also owns Thomas Matthews, a sustainable communication design practise; Think Up, a company specialising in engineering educational materials; Useful Simple Projects, a strategic sustainability consultant, and Useful Studio an architecture design practise.

The trustees of the Useful Simple Trust are:

- Mike Davies, founding director of the Richard Rogers Partnership
- Duncan Michael, former chairman of Ove Arup & Partners
- Sophie Thomas, director of Thomas Matthews
- Ed McCann, director of Useful Simple Projects
- Chris Wise, director of Expedition Engineering
- Seán Walsh, director of Expedition Engineering
- Tim O'Brien, Theatre Designer

== Notable projects ==
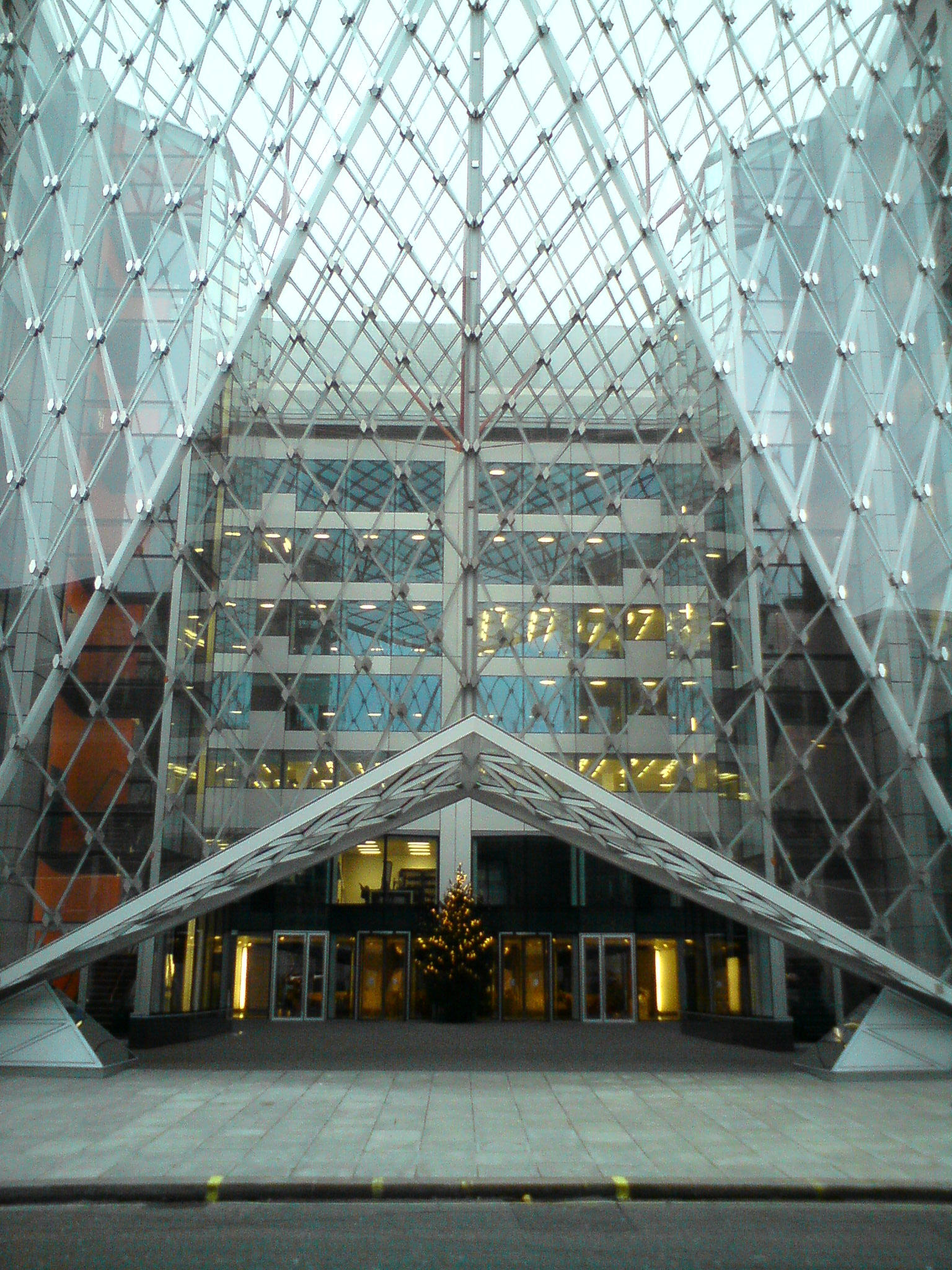
55 Baker Street

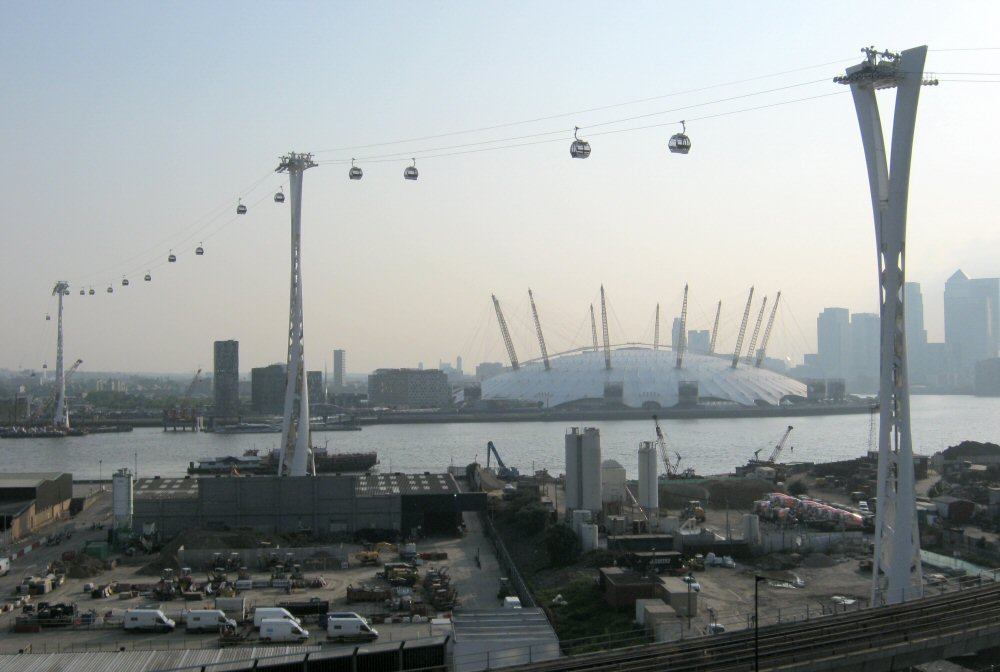
The Emirates Airline

Expedition Engineering's notable projects are:

- London Velodrome, London, England (2011)
- Infinity Bridge, Stockton on Tees, England (2009)
- Las Arenas Bullring, Barcelona, Spain
- 55 Baker Street, London, England (2007)
- Emirates Air Line, London, England (2012)
- Stavros Niarchos Foundation Cultural Center, Athens, Greece (2015)—National Opera and National Library
- Grattacielo Intesa Sanpaolo, Turin, Italy

Expedition is working with One world Design on the design of the new Diamond Jubilee Footbridge across the Thames between Battersea and Chelsea.

In 2018, Expedition put forward a proposal for HS4Air, a 140-kilometre (87 mi) high-speed railway line in the south of England which would connect the High Speed 1 and High Speed 2 railway lines, create a rapid link between Heathrow and Gatwick Airports, and connect regional cities in Britain to the Channel Tunnel. The plans were submitted to the Department for Transport (DfT) at the end of July 2018, as part of the Government's plans to encourage private investment, and the DfT will respond in the autumn.

== Awards ==
Expedition has twice won the IStructE's Supreme Award for Structural Engineering, for the London 2012 Velodrome in 2011 and for the Infinity Bridge in 2009. 55 Baker Street also received a commendation for sustainability at the Structural Awards.

In 2012 Expedition was named Engineering Consultant of the Year at the Building Awards.

== Education ==
Expedition Engineering is involved in several educational projects, including Constructionarium and the Expedition Workshed website, a selection of educational tools for engineering students created by Expedition with the support of a number of other organisations.
