= Tadpole Bridge =

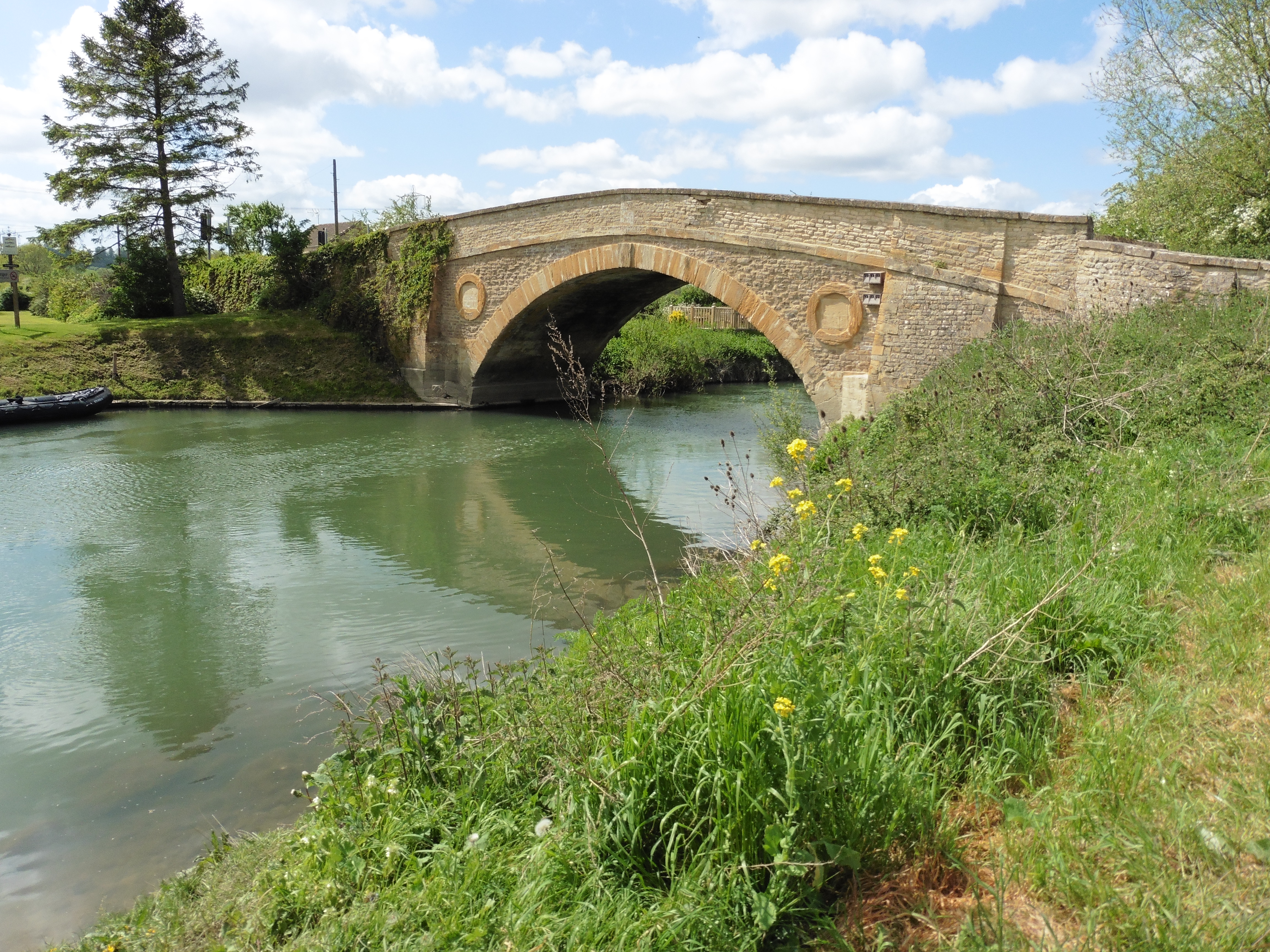
- Tadpole bridge in 2018
- Coordinates: 51.702248°N 1.516643°W
- Carries: Thames Path, Road
- Crosses: River Thames
- Locale: Bampton, Oxfordshire
- Maintained by: Oxfordshire County Council
- Heritage status: Grade II listed

Characteristics
- Design: arch
- Material: Stone
- Height: 14 feet 10 inches (4.52 m)
- No. of spans: 1
- Load limit: 18 tonnes (18 long tons; 20 short tons)

History
- Opened: late 18th century

Location
- Interactive map of Tadpole Bridge

Tadpole Bridge is a road bridge across the River Thames in Oxfordshire, England, carrying a road between Bampton to the north and Buckland to the south. It crosses the Thames on the reach above Shifford Lock. It is a Grade II listed building. The bridge dates from the late 18th century, the earliest reference to it being in 1784. It is built of stone, and consists of one large arch. A bronze Roman bracelet was retrieved from the Thames nearby. There is a public house near Tadpole Bridge called The Trout. Thacker noted that at one time the legend over the door read "The Trout, kept by A. Herring". The Trout is now a hotel and gastropub. The Thames Path crosses Tadpole Bridge.

== See also ==
- Crossings of the River Thames

Next crossing upstream	River Thames	Next crossing downstream
Rushey Lock (pedestrian)	Tadpole Bridge	Tenfoot Bridge (pedestrian)
Next crossing upstream	Thames Path	Next crossing downstream
southern bank Radcot Bridge	Tadpole Bridge	northern bank Tenfoot Bridge
