= New Bridge, River Thames =

Newbridge
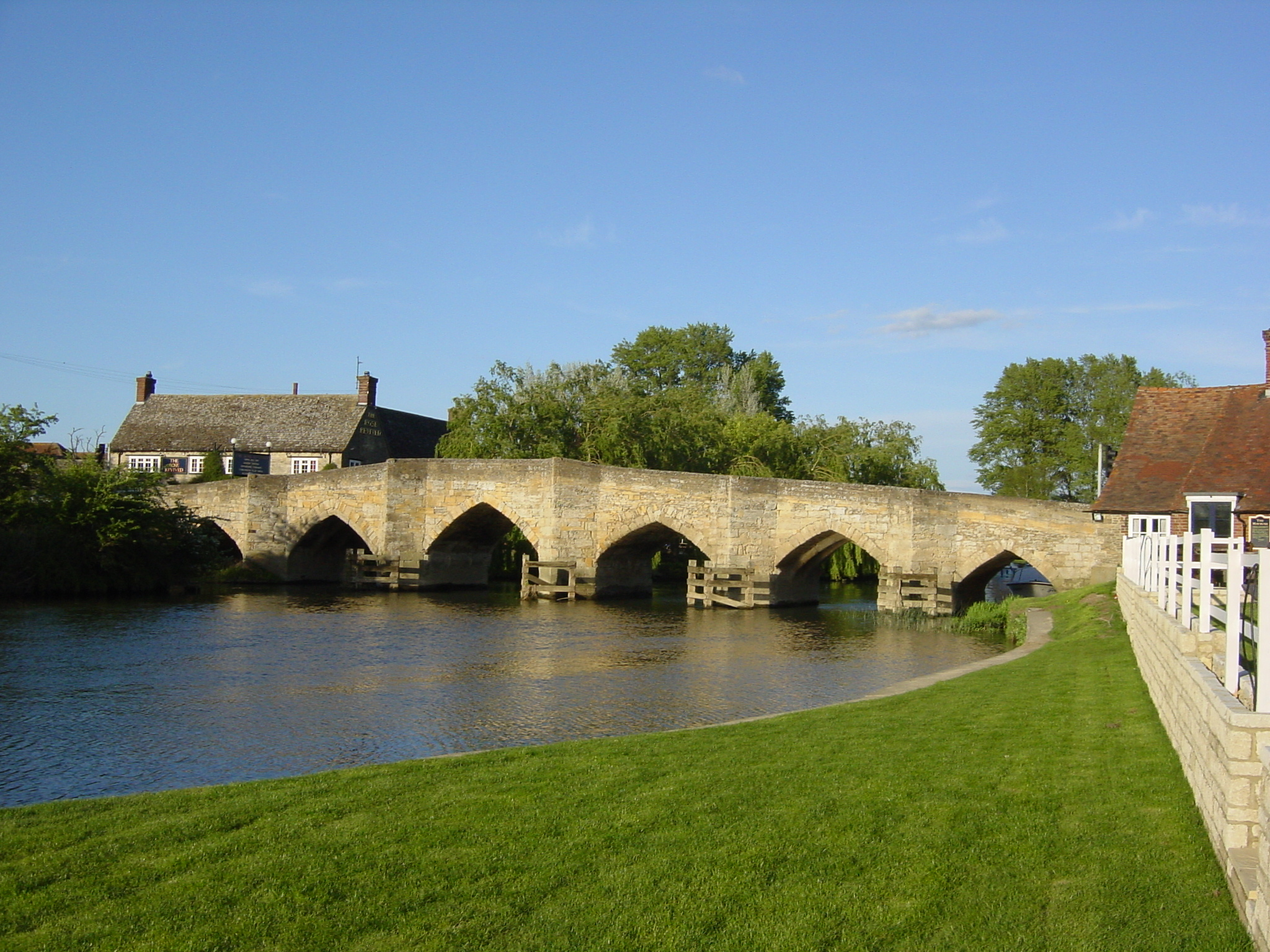
- Newbridge (from the south bank of the Thames)
- Coordinates: 51°42′36″N 01°25′02″W
- Carries: A415 road, Thames Path
- Crosses: River Thames
- Locale: Oxfordshire
- Maintained by: Oxfordshire County Council
- Heritage status: Grade I & II* listed

Characteristics
- Design: arch
- Material: Stone
- Height: 11 feet 6 inches (3.51 m)
- No. of spans: 12
- Piers in water: 5
- Load limit: 18 tonnes (18 long tons; 20 short tons)

Location
- Interactive map of Newbridge

Newbridge is a 13th-century bridge carrying the Abingdon–Witney road (now the A415) over the River Thames in Oxfordshire, England, close to the Thames' confluence with the River Windrush. It is one of the two oldest surviving bridges on the Thames, part Grade I and part Grade II*-listed. The bridge is in a rural setting, with a public house at either end: the Maybush Inn on the south bank and the Rose Revived on the other. The bridge consists of two spans. The northern span crosses the river and the southern span, south of the Maybush, is dry underneath except when the river floods.

== History ==
The bridge dates from the 13th century and is built of Taynton stone in the same way as Radcot Bridge, which is slightly older. They were built by monks on the orders of King John in order to improve communications between the wool towns in the south of England and the Cotswold farms, and this was named "New Bridge" as it was the youngest out of the three bridges built at the time (the third being the Lechlade bridge, replaced in the 19th century). It was originally much longer than it is now, with 51 arches and being 726 yards (664 m) long, compared with the current 12 arches.

Whether Newbridge or Radcot Bridge is the oldest bridge today across the Thames is debatable – Radcot Bridge was built earlier but was extensively damaged during the Wars of the Roses and had to be greatly rebuilt; furthermore, Radcot Bridge no longer crosses the main channel of the river since local reroutings in 1787. In 1644, in the Civil War, the Battle of Newbridge was fought on the banks of the river. Parliamentarian William Waller attempted to cross in order to surround Oxford and capture King Charles but was defeated. In 2007 the area was flooded extensively.

== Current status ==
The bridge is controlled by traffic lights, not being designed to carry modern traffic, and an 18-tonne (18-long-ton; 20-short-ton) weight limit is imposed to protect its weakening structure. Further reductions are considered likely by local authorities. According to a 1996 survey, one of the arches is only capable of carrying its own weight, though it was decided that there was enough leeway to allow traffic to continue across the bridge. The likelihood of collapse is considered "slim". In 2007, local authorities decided to enter into negotiations to buy land that could be used to build a new bridge 270 yards (250 m) upriver, believing that this is the only long-term option available.

The idea of a new bridge is opposed by local residents of Standlake who would prefer to see the existing bridge remain open for light traffic only. In 2017, Oxfordshire County Council installed number-plate recognition cameras to protect Newbridge from overweight vehicles, the first time that ANPR cameras were used to enforce a road weight restriction in the county. The bridge has national recognition and statutory protection from alteration. The northern span is listed at maximal Grade I and the southern at Grade II*, the second-highest of the three grades of listing, designating "particularly important buildings of more than special interest".

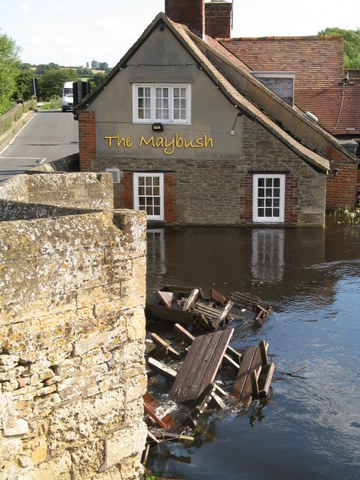
Newbridge during the floods in the summer of 2007

== See also ==
- Crossings of the River Thames

Next crossing upstream	River Thames	Next crossing downstream
Duxford Ford and Shifford Lock Cut footbridge	New Bridge, River Thames	Hart's Weir Footbridge
Next crossing upstream	Thames Path	Next crossing downstream
southern bank Tenfoot Bridge	New Bridge, River Thames	northern bank Pinkhill Lock
