= Mitre Bridge Exchange railway station =

Mitre Bridge Exchange
- Interactive map of Mitre Bridge Exchange

General information
- Location: Old Oak Common
- Local authority: Hammersmith and Fulham
- Number of platforms: 3

Key dates
- 27 May 1844: Opened
- 1 December 1844: Closed

Other information
- Coordinates: 51.525736°N 0.234010°W

Mitre Bridge Exchange was a railway station in Old Oak Common in the parish of Hammersmith, Middlesex, England, which was opened on 27 May 1844 but closed on 1 December 1844. It was also referred to as The Great Western Railway Crossing Station (in an inspection report) and Great Western Junction (in an L&B notice). It was formed of high-level and low-level platforms. The two low-level platforms were located between Paddington and Ealing Broadway, whereas the high-level station had one platform on the West London Line. It was closed when the West London Line was relocated further west and the original line was closed to passengers on 1 December 1844 and to goods in 1860.
