= Battersea Bridge =

Bridge over the River Thames in London

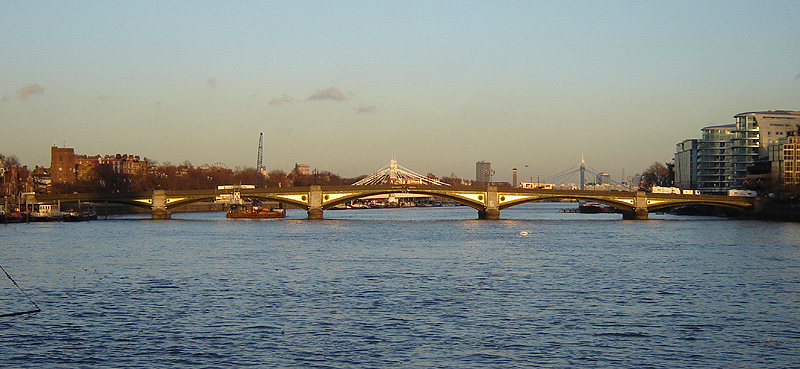
- Coordinates: 51°28′52″N 0°10′21″W
- Carries: A3220 road
- Crosses: River Thames
- Locale: London, England
- Maintained by: Transport for London
- Heritage status: Grade II listed structure
- Preceded by: Battersea Railway Bridge
- Followed by: Albert Bridge

Characteristics
- Design: Arch bridge
- Material: Cast iron and granite
- Total length: 725 feet 6 inches (221.13 m)
- Width: 40 feet (12 m)
- Longest span: 163 feet (50 m)
- No. of spans: 5
- Piers in water: 4
- Clearance below: 38 feet 9 inches (11.8 m) at lowest astronomical tide

History
- Designer: Joseph Bazalgette
- Opened: 21 July 1890; 136 years ago
- Replaces: Old Battersea Bridge (1771–1885) a.k.a. Chelsea Bridge

Statistics
- Daily traffic: 26,041 vehicles (2004); 22,537 vehicles (2010); 23,495 vehicles (2015) >

Location
- Interactive map of Battersea Bridge

Battersea Bridge is a five-span arch bridge crossing the River Thames in London, England. It is situated on a sharp bend in the river, and links Battersea south of the river with Chelsea to the north. The bridge replaced a ferry service that had operated near the site since at least the middle of the 16th century.

The first Battersea Bridge was a toll bridge commissioned by John, Earl Spencer, who had recently acquired the rights to operate the ferry. Although a stone bridge was planned, difficulties in raising investment meant that a cheaper wooden bridge was built instead. Designed by Henry Holland, it was initially opened to pedestrians in November 1771, and to vehicle traffic in 1772. The bridge was inadequately designed and dangerous both to its users and to passing shipping, and boats often collided with it. To reduce the dangers to shipping, two piers were removed and the sections of the bridge above them were strengthened with iron girders.

Although dangerous and unpopular, the bridge was the last surviving wooden bridge on the Thames in London, and was the subject of paintings by many significant artists such as J. M. W. Turner, John Sell Cotman and James McNeill Whistler, including Whistler's Nocturne: Blue and Gold – Old Battersea Bridge, and his controversial Nocturne in Black and Gold – The Falling Rocket.

In 1879 the bridge was taken into public ownership, and in 1885 demolished and replaced with the existing bridge, designed by Sir Joseph Bazalgette and built by John Mowlem & Co. The narrowest surviving road bridge over the Thames in London, it is one of London's least busy Thames bridges. The location on a bend in the river makes the bridge a hazard to shipping, and it has been closed many times due to collisions.

== Background ==
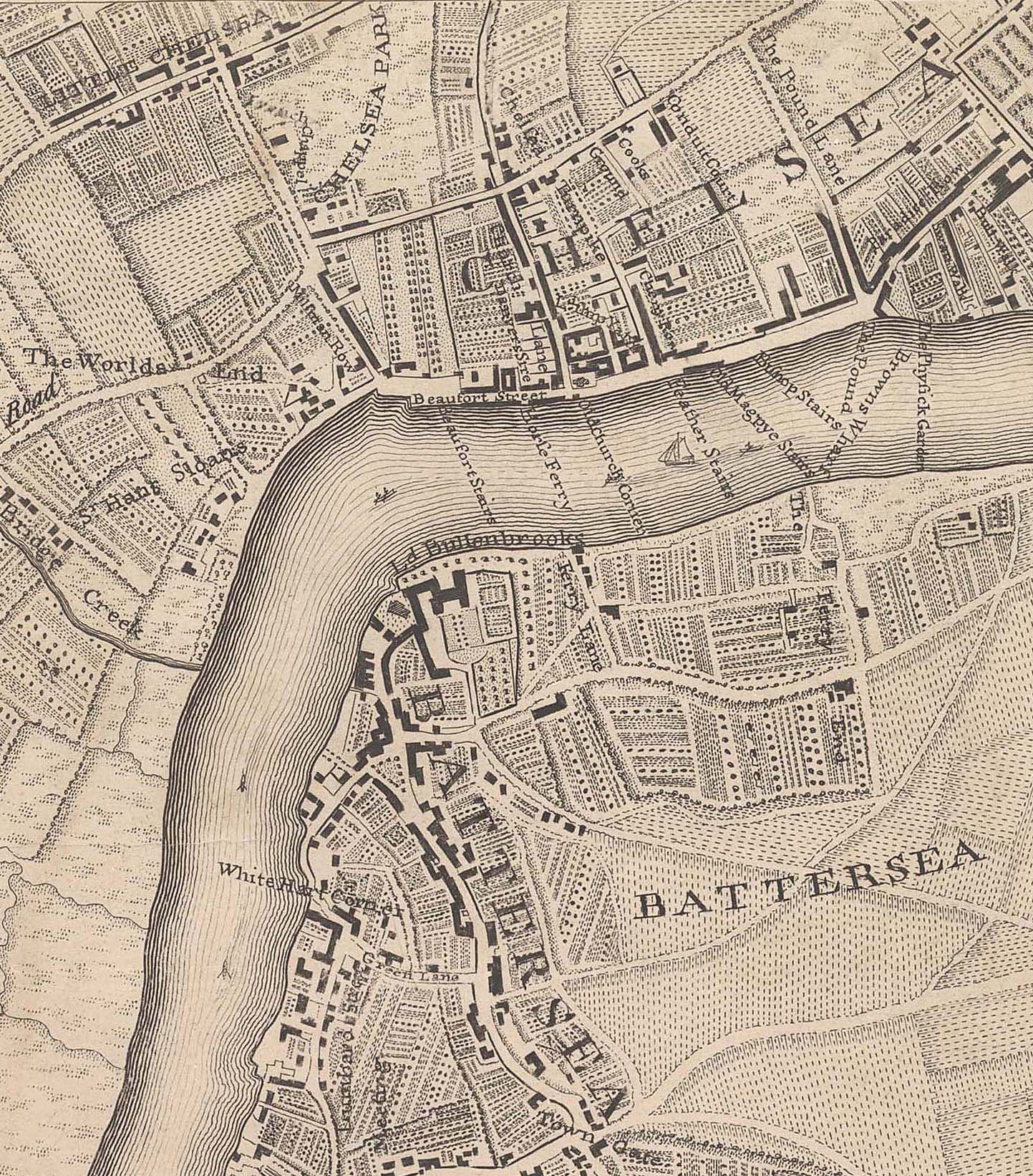
Chelsea and Battersea, 1746. The bridge would be built on the meander in the river, a short distance west of the ferry crossing shown

Chelsea, about 3 miles (4.8 km) west of Westminster on the north bank of the River Thames, has existed as a settlement since at least Anglo-Saxon times. The Thames at this point inflects through a sharp angle from a south–north to an east–west flow, and the slow-moving and relatively easily fordable river here is popularly believed to be the site of Julius Caesar's crossing of the Thames during the 54 BC invasion of Britain. (Note: During the construction of the first Battersea Bridge large quantities of Roman-era bones and weapons were recovered from the riverbed.) Chelsea enjoyed good road and river connections to the seat of government at Westminster and the commercial centre of the City of London since at least the 14th century. It was a centre of the British porcelain industry, and a major producer of baked goods – at peak periods almost 250,000 Chelsea buns per day were sold. By the 18th century it had large numbers of very prosperous residents.

Battersea, listed as Patricesy (St Peter's Water) in the Domesday Book and first mentioned in records of 693 AD, on the south bank of the river opposite Chelsea, was by contrast low and marshy land, prone to flooding. Conditions were ideal for farming asparagus and lavender, (Note: The present day place name of Lavender Hill derives from the lavender farms in the area.) and a small market town grew in the area based on the asparagus and lavender industries.

Although Chelsea and Battersea had been linked by ferry since at least 1550, the nearest fixed links between the two were Putney Bridge, 2 1/2 miles (4.0 km) upstream and opened in 1729, and Westminster Bridge, 3 miles (4.8 km) downstream, opened in 1746. In 1763 John, Earl Spencer, purchased the manor of Battersea, and consequently acquired ownership of the ferry service between Chelsea and Battersea.

The ferry was old and somewhat dangerous, and Spencer formed the Battersea Bridge Company and sought and obtained parliamentary consent via the Battersea Bridge Act 1766 (6 Geo. 3. c. 66) to build "a fine stone bridge" across the Thames. The bridge was to be built between Cheyne Walk and Battersea, at the point where the river's course turns sharply east towards Westminster, at a projected cost of £83,000 (about £14,236,000 in 2025). The earl had anticipated that many local residents would invest in the project, but soon found that there was widespread scepticism about the scheme. Only 15 investors, including the earl himself, were willing to invest, and a total of only £17,662 (about £2,657,000 in 2025) was raised, far less than was needed to finance the ambitious project.

== Old Battersea Bridge ==
Old Battersea Bridge, Walter Greaves (1874)

Spencer calculated that the money raised would be sufficient to finance a modest timber bridge, and a design was commissioned from rising architect Henry Holland. The bridge was built to Holland's designs by John Phillips, whose uncle Thomas Phillips had built the 1729 bridge at Putney. The bridge was opened to pedestrians in November 1771 while still incomplete. In 1772 a chalk and gravel surface was added and the bridge was opened to vehicle traffic. Tolls were charged on a sliding scale, ranging from 1/2d for pedestrians to 1 shilling for vehicles drawn by four or more horses. The bridge was never formally named, and was referred to on maps of the period as both "Battersea Bridge" and "Chelsea Bridge". (Note: The first bridge on the site of the present day Chelsea Bridge was not opened until 1858.)

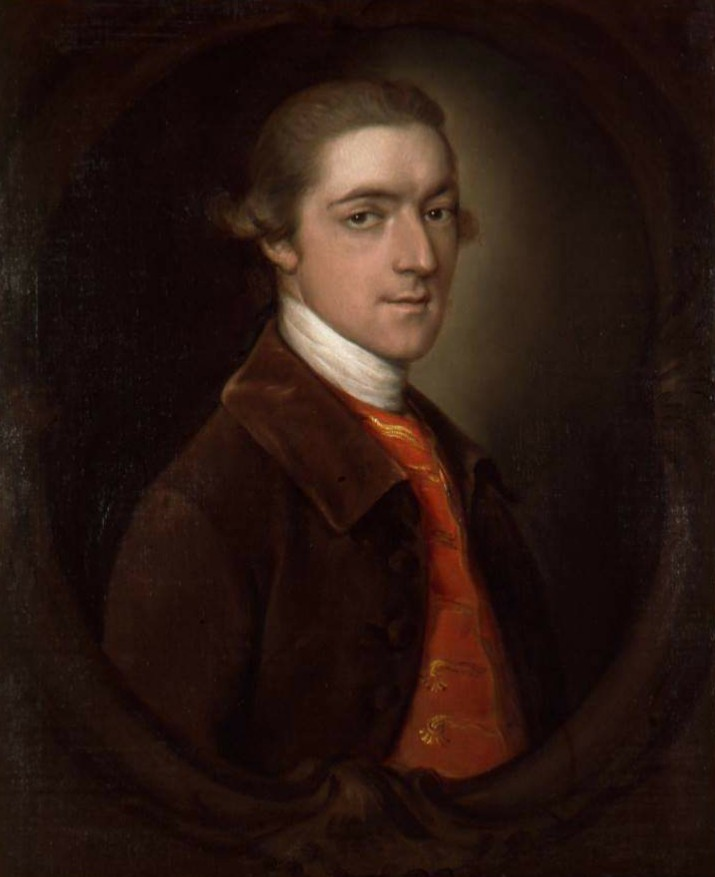
John, Earl Spencer, commissioned the first Battersea Bridge

The bridge was not a commercial success. It was 734 feet (224 m) long and only 24 feet (7.3 m) wide, making it impractical for larger vehicles to use. Holland's design consisted of nineteen separate narrow spans, the widest being only 32 feet (9.8 m) wide, and boats found it difficult to navigate beneath the bridge; there were a number of accidents including serious injuries and deaths. Repeatedly rammed by passing shipping, the bridge required frequent costly repairs, and dividends paid to investors were low. During a particularly cold winter in 1795 the bridge was badly damaged by ice, necessitating lengthy and expensive reconstruction, and no dividends at all were paid for the next three years. Concerns were expressed in Parliament about the reliability of the bridge, and the Battersea Bridge Company was obliged to provide a ferry service at the same rate as the bridge tolls, in the event of the bridge being closed for repairs.

In an effort to improve the bridge's poor safety record for its customers, oil lamps were added to the deck in 1799, making Battersea Bridge the first Thames bridge to be lit. Between 1821 and 1824 the flimsy wooden fences along the edges of the bridge, which were often breaking, were replaced by sturdy iron 4-foot (1.2 m) railings, and in 1824 the oil lamps were themselves replaced by gas lighting. In 1873, in an effort to improve navigation around the bridge and reduce accidents, two of the piers were removed, making the widest span a more easily navigated 77 feet (23 m), and the bridge deck was strengthened with iron girders to compensate for the missing piers.

=== Competition and disputes with Vauxhall Bridge ===
In 1806, a scheme was proposed by Ralph Dodd to open the south bank of the Thames opposite Westminster and London for development, by building a new major road from Hyde Park Corner to Kennington and Greenwich, crossing the river at Vauxhall, about halfway between Battersea Bridge and Westminster Bridge. The Battersea Bridge Company were concerned about the potential loss of custom, and petitioned Parliament against the scheme, stating that "[Dodd] is a well known adventurer and Speculist, and the projector of numerous undertakings upon a large scale most if not all of which have failed", (Note: Dodd had been involved in many unsuccessful transport schemes. Between 1799 and 1803 he attempted to drive a tunnel beneath the Thames between Tilbury and Gravesend. A plan to dig a canal between London and Epsom was abandoned after reaching Peckham, three miles away. He provided the original designs for the new Waterloo Bridge and London Bridge, both of which were taken over by John Rennie, while his design for Hammersmith Bridge had to be suspended when the owners of a strip of land blocking the approach road refused to sell it to the bridge company.) and the bill was abandoned. However, in 1809 a new bill was presented to Parliament for a bridge at Vauxhall, this time obliging the operators of the new bridge to compensate the Battersea Bridge Company for any losses, and the company allowed it to pass as the Vauxhall Bridge Act 1809 (49 Geo. 3. c. cxlii) and accepted compensation. The act obliged the Vauxhall Bridge Company to reimburse the Battersea Bridge Company for any loss in revenue caused by the new bridge.

After many delays and setbacks, the new bridge at Vauxhall (initially named Regent Bridge after George, Prince Regent, but shortly afterwards renamed Vauxhall Bridge) opened on 4 June 1816. However, the Vauxhall Bridge Company failed to pay the agreed compensation to the Battersea Bridge Company and were taken to court. After a legal dispute lasting five years, a judgment was made in favour of the Battersea Bridge Company, with the Vauxhall Bridge Company being obliged to pay £8,234 (about £782,000 in 2025) compensation.

=== Old Battersea Bridge in art ===
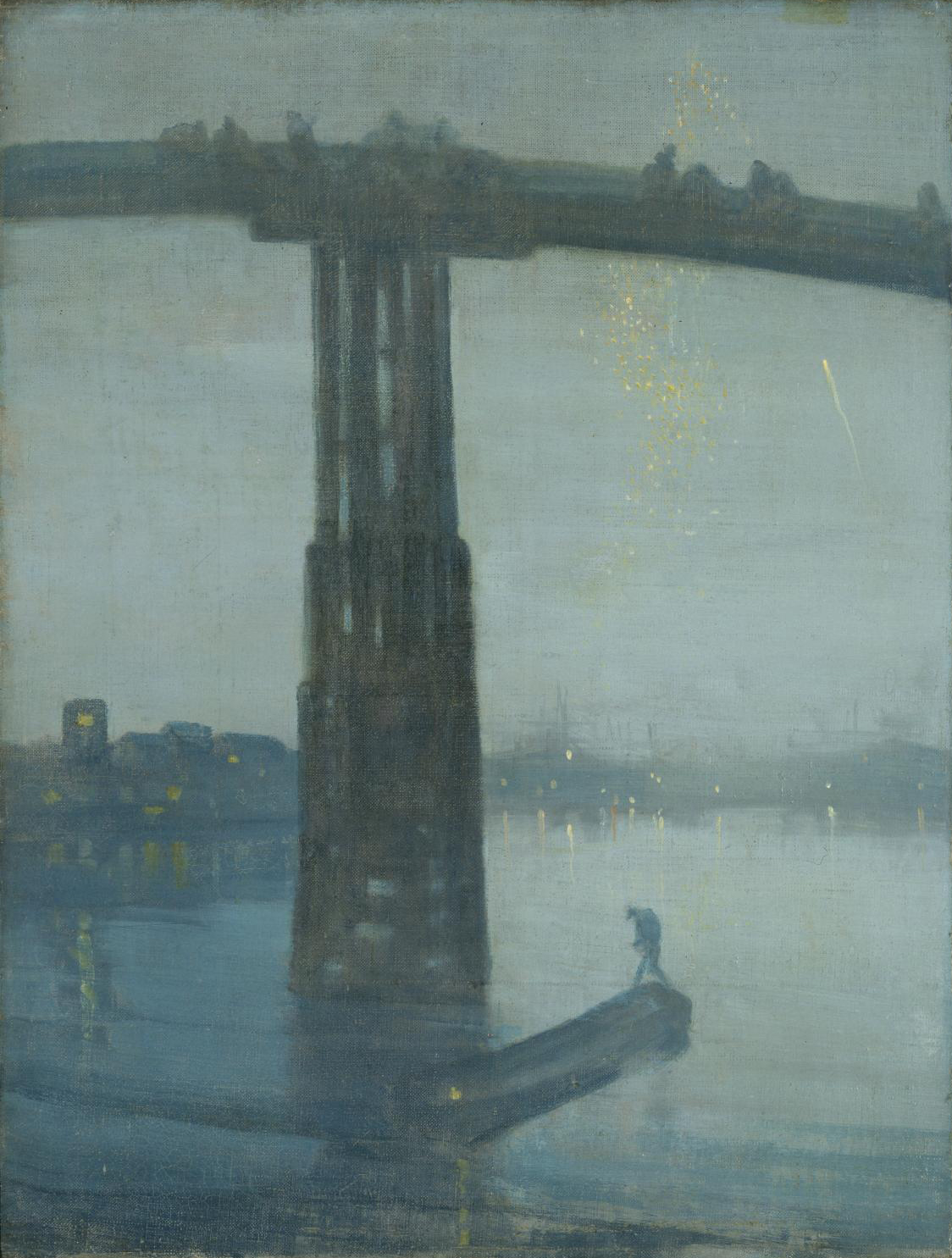
Nocturne: Blue and Gold – Old Battersea Bridge, James McNeill Whistler (c.1872–75)

Although the bridge was inconvenient for its users and flimsily constructed, as the last surviving wooden bridge on the Thames in the London area it was considered an important landmark, and many leading artists of the period were attracted to it. (Note: Although temporary wooden bridges were sometimes erected on the Thames during maintenance works or wartime, following the demolition of the mediaeval Kingston Bridge in 1825 Battersea Bridge was the last surviving permanent wooden bridge on the Thames in what is now Greater London. Other wooden bridges over the Thames, such as Tenfoot Bridge and Old Man's Bridge, still exist on the narrow upper reaches of the river.) Camille Pissarro, J. M. W. Turner, John Sell Cotman and John Atkinson Grimshaw produced significant paintings of the bridge. Walter Greaves, whose family owned a boathouse adjacent to the bridge and whose father had been boatman to Turner, painted numerous scenes of the bridge. Local resident and mentor to Greaves James McNeill Whistler created many images of it, including the influential Hokusai-inspired Nocturne: Blue and Gold – Old Battersea Bridge (painted c. 1872–5), in which the dimensions of the bridge are intentionally distorted and Chelsea Old Church and the newly built Albert Bridge are visible through a stylised London fog.

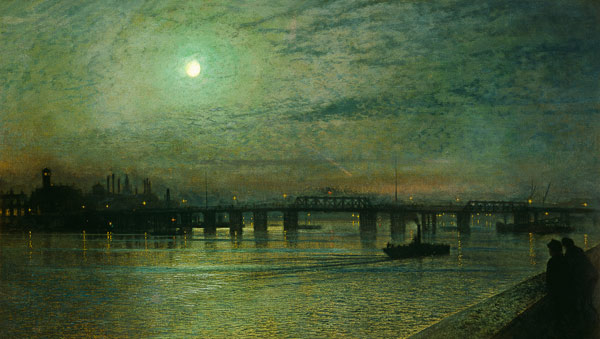
Battersea Bridge, John Atkinson Grimshaw (1885)

Whistler's Nocturne series achieved notoriety in 1877, when influential critic John Ruskin visited an exhibition of the series at the Grosvenor Gallery. He wrote of the painting Nocturne in Black and Gold – The Falling Rocket, that Whistler was "asking two hundred guineas for flinging a pot of paint in the public's face". Whistler sued for libel, the case reaching the courts in 1878. The judge in the case caused laughter in the court when, referring to Nocturne: Blue and Gold – Old Battersea Bridge, he asked Whistler "Which part of the picture is the bridge?"; the case ended with Whistler awarded token damages of one farthing.

In 1905, Nocturne: Blue and Gold became the first significant acquisition by the newly formed National Art Collections Fund, and is now in Tate Britain.

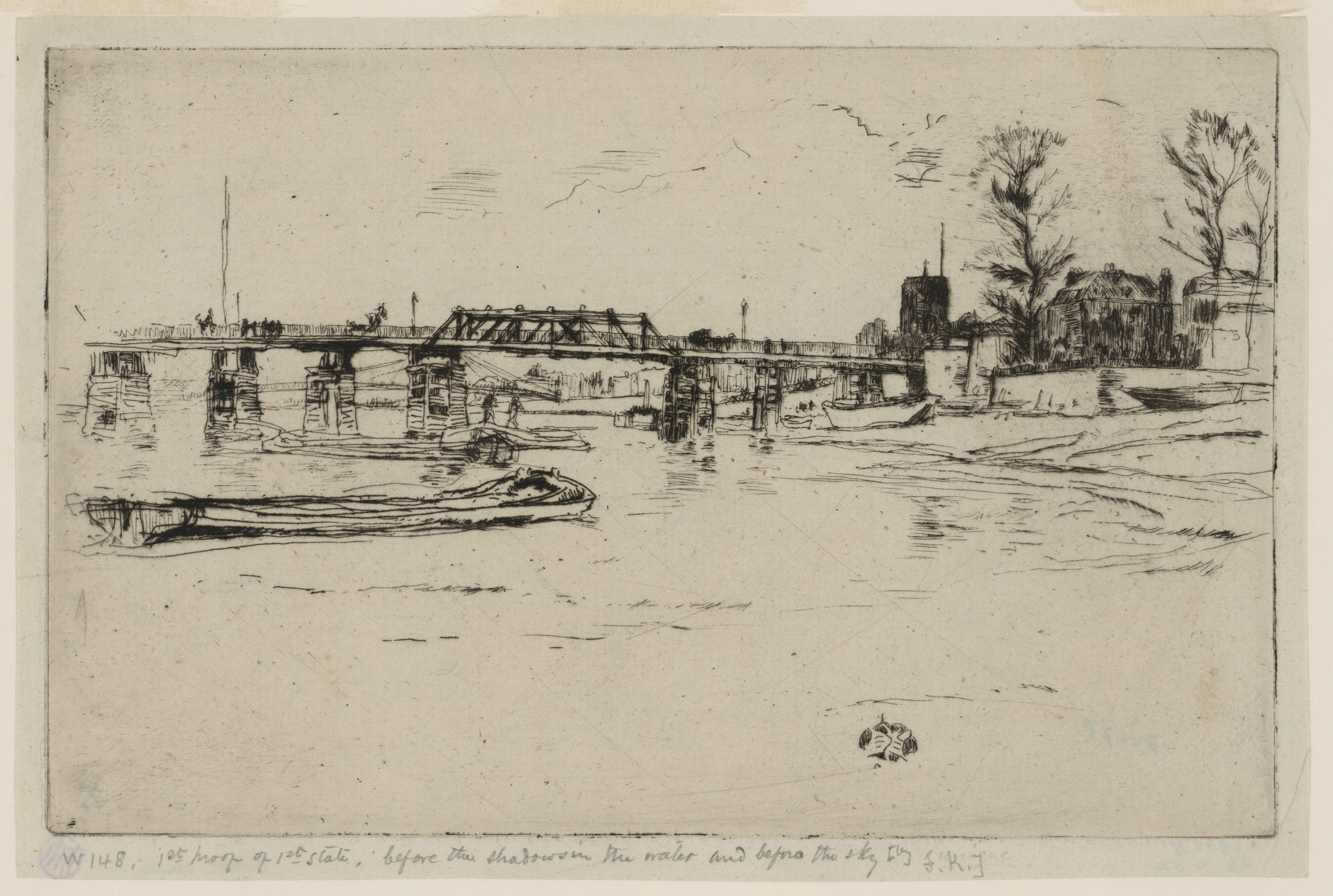
Chelsea: Old Battersea Bridge and Chelsea Church, James McNeill Whistler, c. 1879

=== Takeover and public ownership ===
A more modern and convenient competing bridge opened nearby at Chelsea Bridge in 1858, and usage of Battersea Bridge fell sharply. There were serious public concerns about the safety of the bridge by this time, after an 1844 incident in which a woman was murdered on the bridge in view of one of the toll collectors, who did not intervene because both parties had paid their fares.

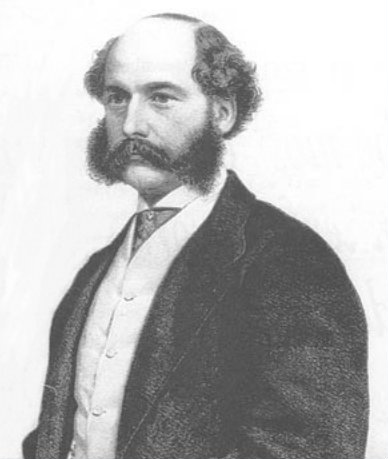
Joseph Bazalgette

The new Albert Bridge opened in 1873, less than 500 yards (460 m) from Battersea Bridge. Mindful of the impact the new bridge would have on older bridge's financial viability, the Albert Bridge Act 1864 (27 & 28 Vict. c. ccxxxv) authorising the Albert Bridge compelled the Albert Bridge Company to purchase Battersea Bridge at the time of the new bridge's opening and to compensate the owners of Battersea Bridge with £3,000 (about £330,000 in 2025) per annum until the new bridge opened, and so Battersea Bridge was bought outright by the Albert Bridge Company in 1873. By this time the bridge was in extremely poor condition, and there were many calls from local residents for it to be demolished. As an interim measure, the Albert Bridge's architect Rowland Mason Ordish strengthened the foundations of the bridge with concrete while debate continued as to its future.

The Metropolis Toll Bridges Act 1877 (40 & 41 Vict. c. xcix) was passed, which allowed the Metropolitan Board of Works to buy all London bridges between Hammersmith and Waterloo Bridges and free them from tolls, and in 1879 the Board of Works bought Albert and Battersea bridges for a combined cost of £170,000 (about £18,264,000 in 2025) and the tolls were removed from both bridges.

Inspections by the Chief Engineer of the Metropolitan Board of Works, Sir Joseph Bazalgette, following the purchase found that Battersea Bridge was in such poor condition that it was unable to be repaired safely. In 1883 it was restricted to pedestrian traffic only, and in 1885 it was demolished by John Mowlem and Co., who also built a temporary footbridge, to make way for a new bridge designed by Bazalgette.

== New Battersea Bridge ==
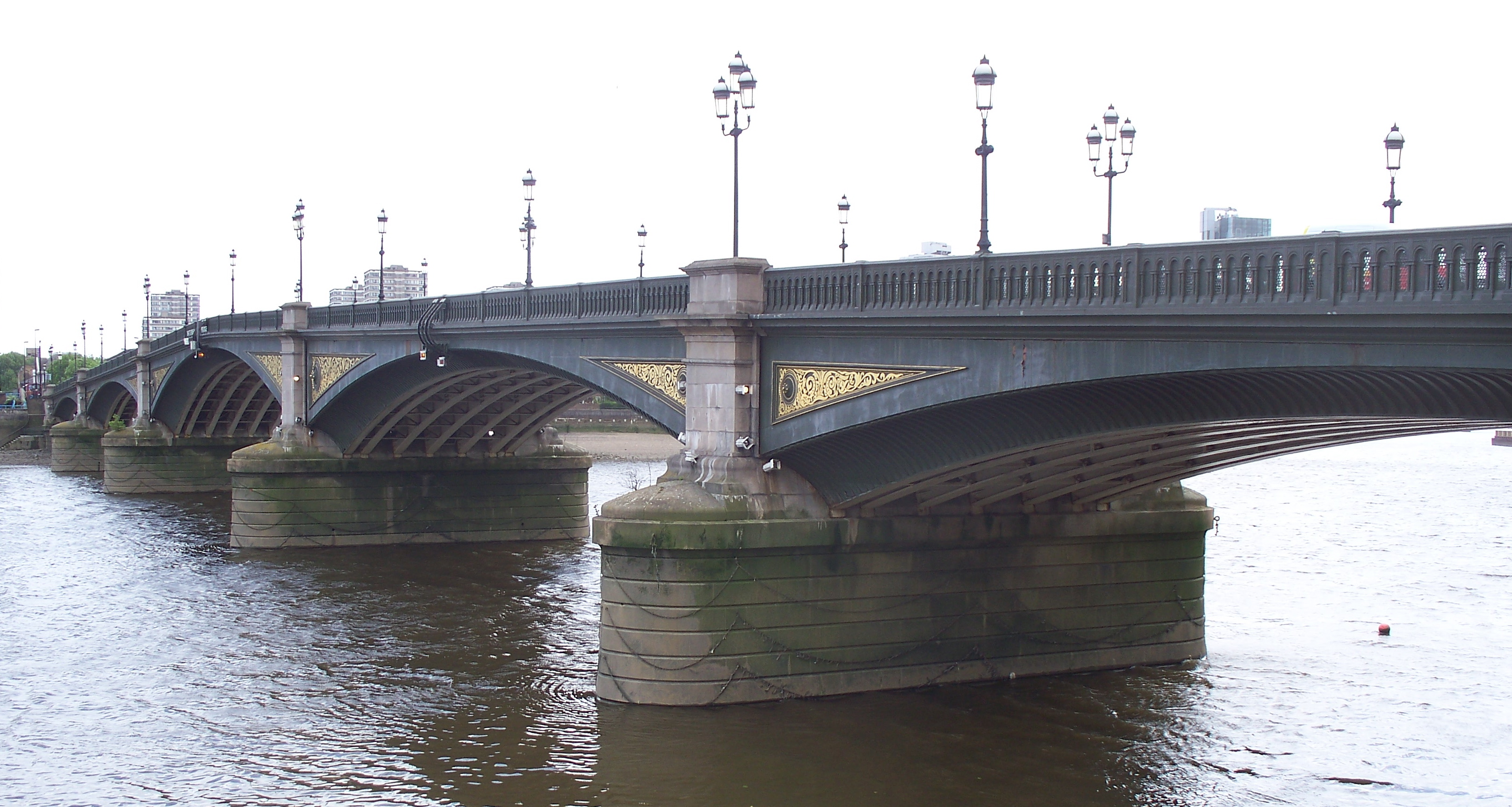
The new Battersea Bridge

The contract to build the new bridge was awarded initially to Messrs Godfrey who tendered for £120,000. However, they withdrew their tender when Bazalgette reckoned the cost at nearer £147,000. The contract was then awarded to Williams Son and Wallington who tendered for £143,000. { In June 1887 the Duke of Clarence laid a ceremonial foundation stone in the southern abutment and construction work began. [See Chelsea News and General Advertiser, 25 June 1887}. Bazalgette's design incorporated five arches with cast iron griders, on granite piers which in turn rest on concrete foundations. The roadway itself is 24 feet (7.3 m) wide, and 8-foot (2.4 m) wide footpaths are cantilevered on either side of the bridge, (Note: The cantilevering is hidden by ornamental iron casings, and is not visibly apparent other than from beneath the bridge.) giving the bridge a total width of 40 feet (12 m). The balustrade is a distinctive Moorish-style lattice. Construction work was overseen by Bazalgette's son Edward, and cost a total of £143,000 (about £15,887,000 in 2025).

On 21 July 1890, the bridge was officially opened by future Prime Minister Lord Rosebery, then chairman of the newly formed London County Council. [See Illustrated London News, 26 July 1890} Unlike its predecessor, the new bridge was officially named Battersea Bridge. Although the road was narrow, trams operated on it from the outset. Initially these were horse-drawn, but from 22 June 1911 the electric trams of London County Council Tramways were introduced.

=== Collisions ===
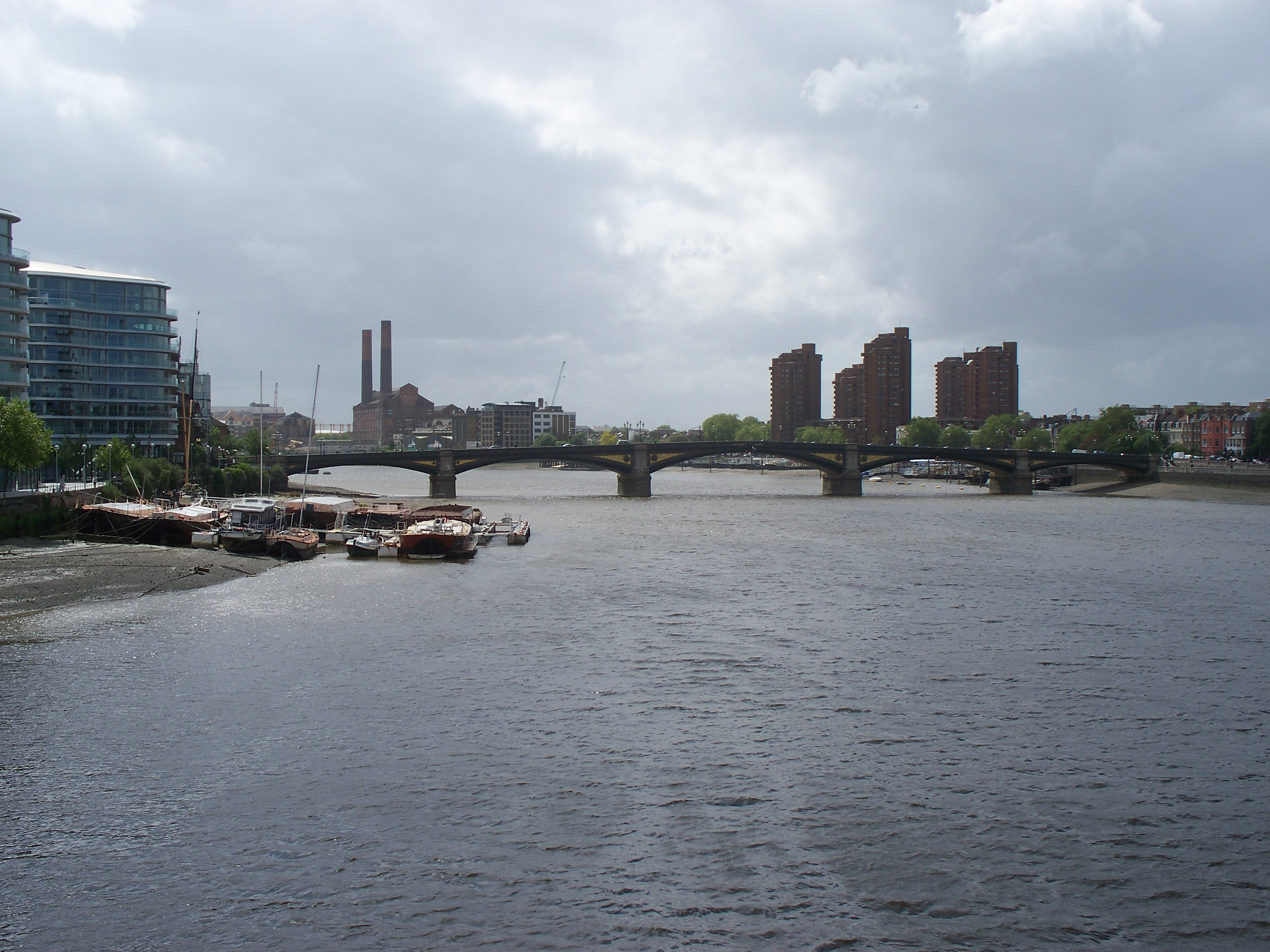
The Thames curves sharply at Battersea Bridge

Although the five spans of the current bridge are far wider than the nineteen spans of the original bridge, Battersea Bridge's location on a sharp bend in the river still presents a hazard to navigation. In 1948, the MV Delta jammed under the bridge, and its master Hendrikus Oostring suffered broken arms and needed to be rescued from the smashed wheelhouse. On 23 March 1950, the collier John Hopkinson collided with the central pier, causing serious structural damage, leaving the tram tracks as the only element holding the bridge together. The London County Council was concerned that the entire structure would collapse and closed the bridge until January 1951. Tram services in the area were withdrawn on 30 September 1950, so when the bridge was reopened the tram tracks were lifted. Another serious incident took place on 21 September 2005, when the James Prior, a 200-ton barge, collided with the bridge, causing serious structural damage costing over £500,000 to repair. The bridge was closed to all motor vehicles other than buses while repairs were carried out, causing severe traffic congestion; it eventually reopened on 16 January 2006. Brian King, the master of the James Prior, was formally cleared of navigating without due care and attention in 2008, when the judge in the case injured his back and was unable to proceed, and prosecutors decided not to re-present the case.

=== Restoration ===
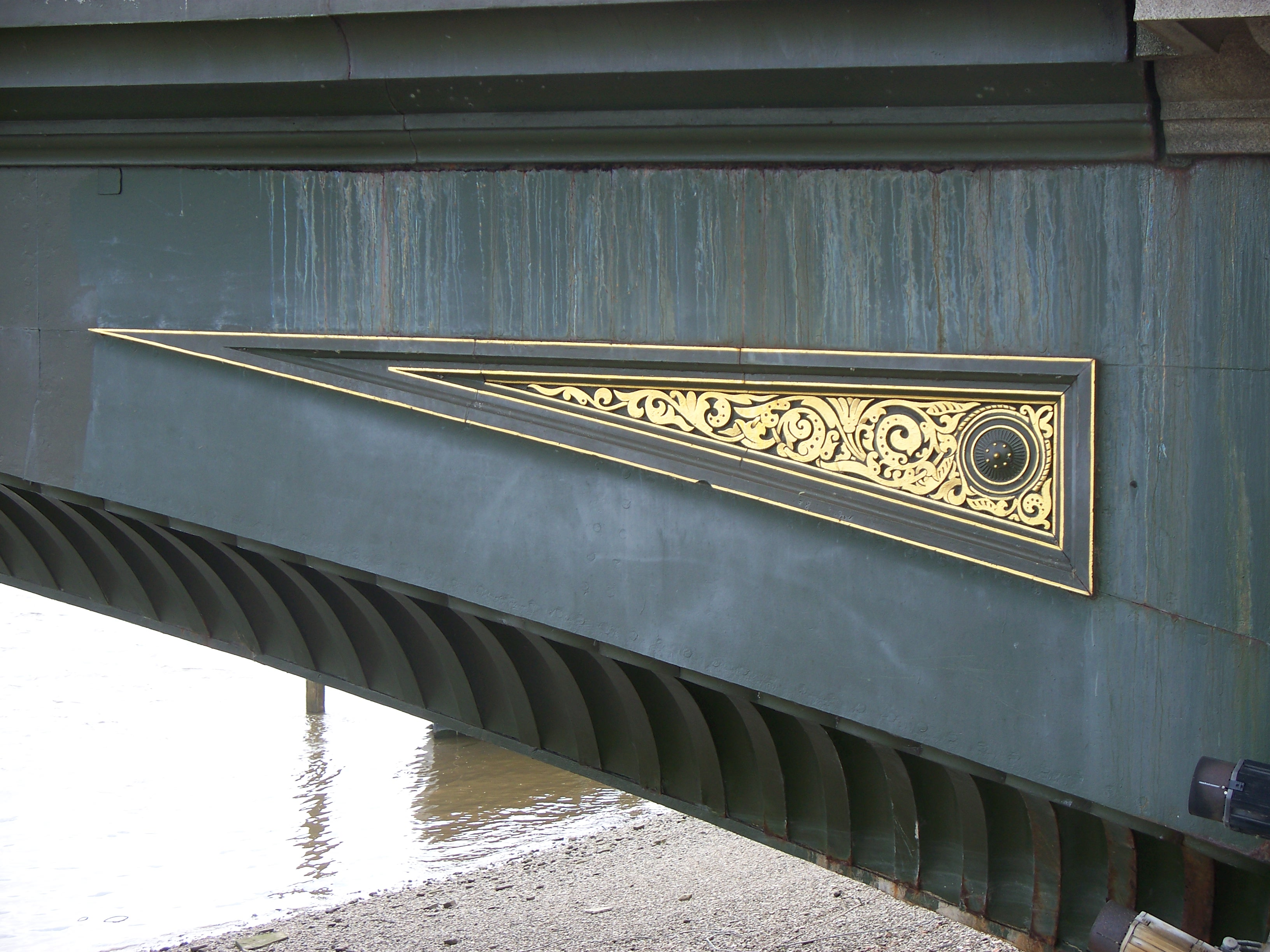
Detail of the spandrels following restoration

At only 40 feet (12 m) wide, Bazalgette's bridge is now London's narrowest surviving road bridge over the Thames, and in 2004 was the fifth least-used Thames bridge in London. In 1983 the bridge was designated a Grade II listed structure, protecting its character from further alterations, and in 1992 English Heritage oversaw a project to renovate the bridge, which for some years had been painted blue and red.

Paint samples were analysed and photographs from the time of opening consulted, and the bridge was restored to its original appearance. The main body of the bridge was painted in dark green, with the spandrels decorated in gilding. The lamp standards, which had been removed during the Second World War, were replaced with replicas copied from the surviving posts at the ends of the bridge. A statue of James McNeill Whistler by Nicholas Dimbleby was erected at the north end of the bridge in 2005.

=== 2006 Thames whale ===
Shortly after its reopening following the collision with the James Prior, the bridge briefly attained national prominence on 20 January 2006 when a 19-foot (5.8 m) long female bottlenose whale became stranded at Battersea Bridge. A rescue operation was mounted, and large crowds flocked to the bridge. The whale was successfully transferred to a barge, but died while being transported back to the sea to be released. A year after the whale's death, its skeleton was put on public display in the offices of The Guardian newspaper. Today it resides at the Natural History Museum.

== See also ==
- List of crossings of the River Thames
- List of bridges in London
- Grade II listed buildings in the London Borough of Wandsworth

== Notes and references ==
Notes

Bibliography

- Cookson, Brian (2006). Crossing the River. Edinburgh: Mainstream. ISBN 978-1-84018-976-6. OCLC 63400905.
- Davenport, Neil (2006). Thames Bridges: From Dartford to the Source. Kettering: Silver Link Publishing. ISBN 978-1-85794-229-3.
- Gaunt, William (1975). Kensington and Chelsea. London: Batsford. ISBN 978-0-7134-2919-0. OCLC 1528591.
- Matthews, Peter (2008). London's Bridges. Oxford: Shire. ISBN 978-0-7478-0679-0. OCLC 213309491.
- Pay, Ian; Lloyd, Sampson; Waldegrave, Keith (2009). London's Bridges: Crossing the Royal River. Wisley: Artists' and Photographers' Press. ISBN 978-1-904332-90-9. OCLC 280442308.
- Roberts, Chris (2005). Cross River Traffic. London: Granta. ISBN 978-1-86207-800-0.
