= Old Battersea Bridge (Greaves) =

Painting by Walter Greaves

- Artist: Walter Greaves
- Year: 1874
- Type: Oil on canvas, landscape painting
- Dimensions: 58.4 cm × 76.2 cm (23.0 in × 30.0 in)
- Location: Tate Britain, London

Old Battersea Bridge is an 1874 landscape painting by the British artist Walter Greaves. It shows Battersea Bridge linking Battersea and Chelsea on the River Thames in London. The view is taken from Cheyne Walk. The glass structure of the Crystal Palace can be seen in the far distance in its South London location. The original bridge dating back to the Georgian era was demolished less than a decade later and replaced with the current structure.

Greaves was a waterman who informally studied under the American artist James McNeill Whistler. His family's boatyard is shown on the near bank of the river. The painting was acquired as part of the Chantrey Bequest and presented to the Tate Gallery in 1931.

== See also ==
- Nocturne: Blue and Gold – Old Battersea Bridge, 1872 painting by James McNeill Whistler

== Bibliography ==
- Gaunt, William. The Restless Century: Painting in Britain, 1800–1900. Phaidon, 1972.
- Jacobi, Carol (ed.) James McNeill Whistler. Tate Publishing, 2026.
- Simmons, Jack. Transport. Vista Books, 1962.
- Sutherland, Daniel E. Whistler: A Life for Art's Sake. Yale University Press, 2014.
