= Walter Greaves (artist) =

English painter

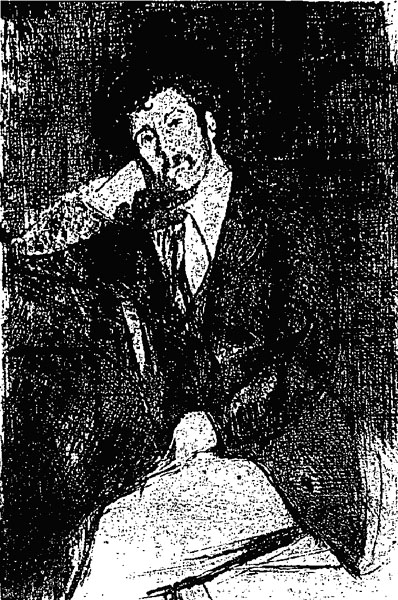
Walter Greaves - etched self-portrait (1900)

Walter Greaves (4 July 1846 – 28 November 1930) was a British painter, etcher and topographical draftsman.

== Biography ==
Watercolour by Greaves of Whistler in his studio, at work on the painting that became known as Whistler's Mother

The son of Charles William Greaves, a Chelsea boat builder and waterman, and his wife, Elizabeth Greenway, Greaves was born in 1846 at 31 Cheyne Walk, Chelsea, London. His father had been J. M. W. Turner's boatman. Greaves and one of his brothers, Henry Greaves (1844–1904), met James McNeill Whistler in 1863, introducing him to the sights of the River Thames, and becoming his studio assistants, pupils and close friends for over 20 years. The American painter later used these Thames expeditions for inspiration when painting his ‘nocturne’ views of the river at night. "He taught us to paint", Walter Greaves said, "and we taught him the waterman's jerk". Walter Greaves had initially trained as a shipwright and boatman.

The most famous of Greaves' paintings is Hammersmith Bridge on Boat-Race Day, a naïve masterpiece which he claimed to have painted when he was aged sixteen in 1862; however, since he was unreliable over dates, its history has never been settled. The Greaves brothers accompanied Whistler to life class and Walter Greaves attempted to paint portraits, some of his most successful being of their neighbour Thomas Carlyle, whom Whistler also painted. Greaves also drew and painted Whistler, sometimes in caricature, in Chelsea settings and in characteristic moods. In 1876 the Greaves brothers helped Whistler decorate The Peacock Room (now in the Freer Gallery of Art, Washington, D.C.), for the shipowner Frederick Leyland.

During the late 1870s Whistler began to gather a more sophisticated group of friends about himself, including Walter Sickert and Mortimer Menpes. Excluded from this distinguished circle, Greaves suffered years of neglect, misfortune and poverty before his discovery by William Marchant, proprietor of the Goupil Galleries, who exhibited Greaves's work in his London gallery in 1911.

Greaves's new-found glory was short-lived, however: three weeks after the exhibition opened, Whistler's self-appointed biographers, Joseph Pennell and Elizabeth Pennell, damaged Greaves's reputation by claiming that he had plagiarized Whistler's work. In May 1911, Greaves sold eight letters from Whistler to his father and himself at auction. Another exhibition of his work was held in 1922 at the Grosvenor Gallery arranged by Augustus John, William Nicholson and William Rothenstein. He was elected an honorary member of the Chelsea Arts Club.

Despite the support of a few fellow painters, including Sickert, Greaves again fell into obscurity and spent his last eight years as a Poor Brother of the London Charterhouse.

Greaves died, unmarried, of pneumonia in the West London Hospital, Hammersmith, on 23 November 1930. He was buried in the Charterhouse graveyard at Little Hallingbury in Essex.

The Tate Gallery holds examples of his work, including two self-portraits. The Parkin Gallery held exhibitions of his work in 1980 and 1984.

His former home at 104 Cheyne Walk in Chelsea, where he lived from 1855 to 1897, has a commemorative blue plaque.

== Gallery ==
Old Battersea Bridge (1874) by Greaves

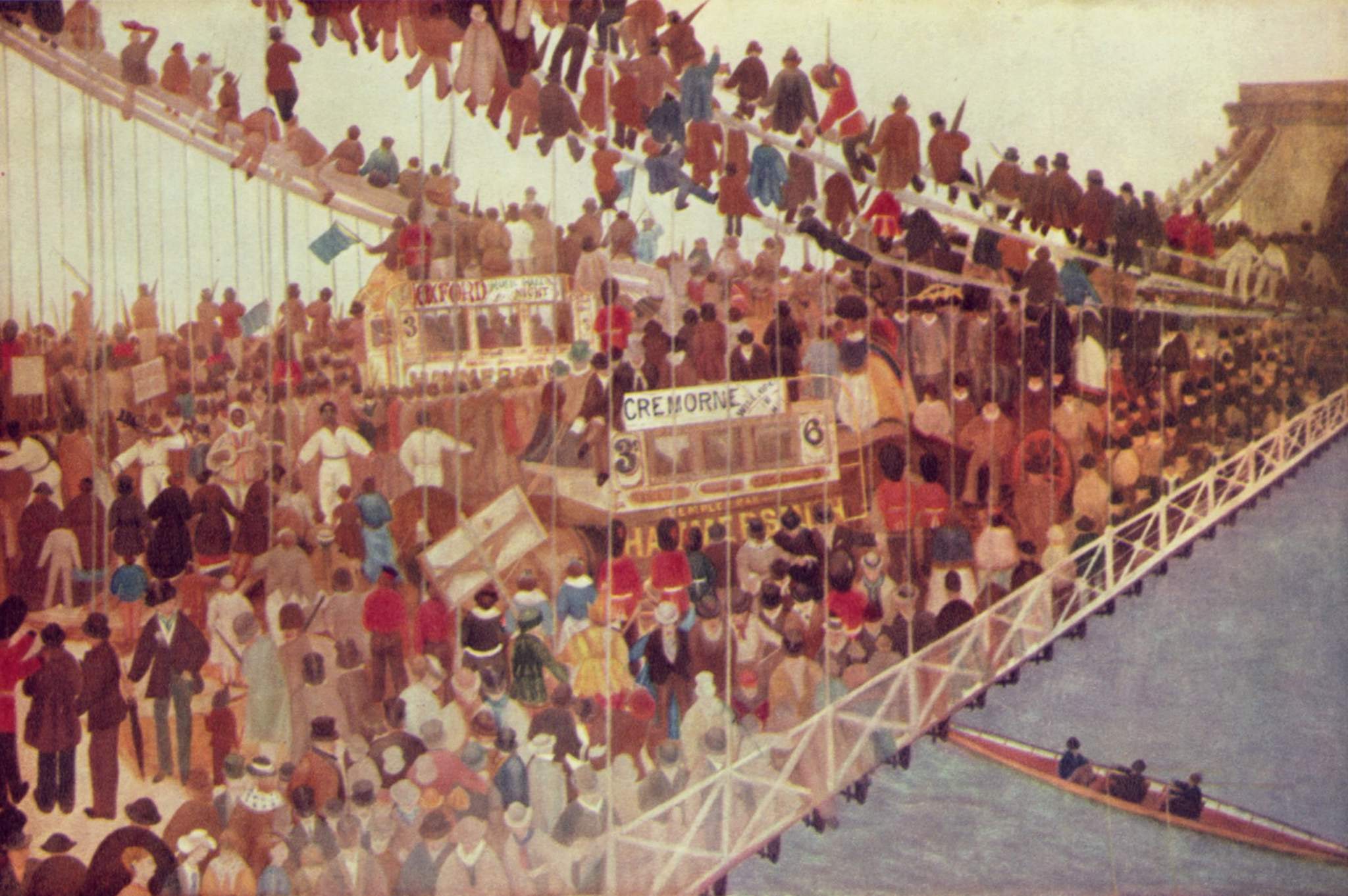
Hammersmith Bridge on Boat-Race Day (1862) by Greaves

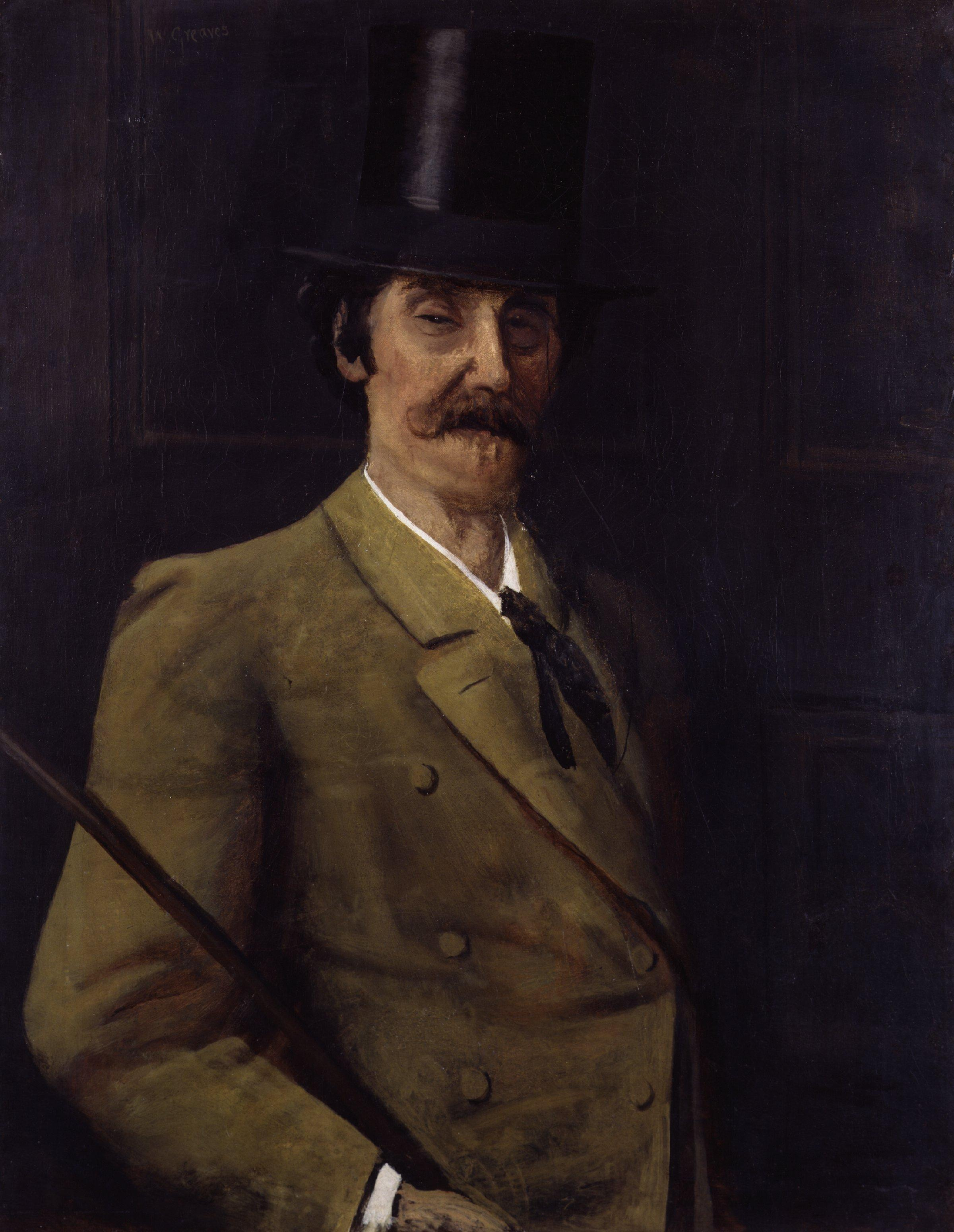
Whistler by Greaves

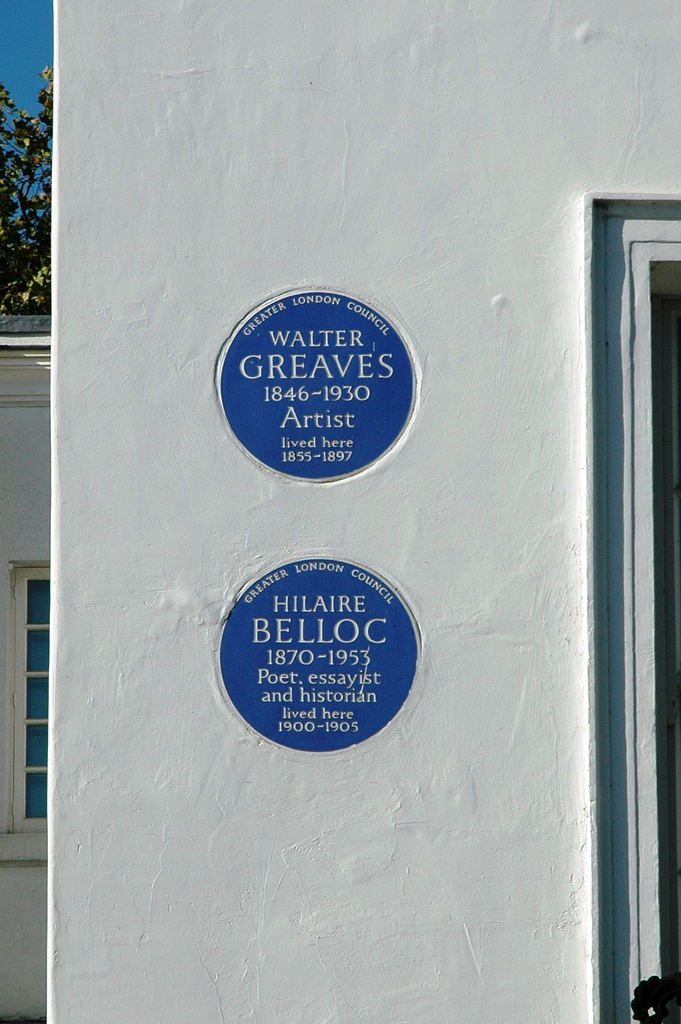
Blue plaques to Walter Greaves and Hilaire Belloc in Chelsea
