= Nocturne: Blue and Gold – Old Battersea Bridge =

Painting by James Abbott McNeill Whistler

Nocturne: Blue and Gold — Old Battersea Bridge
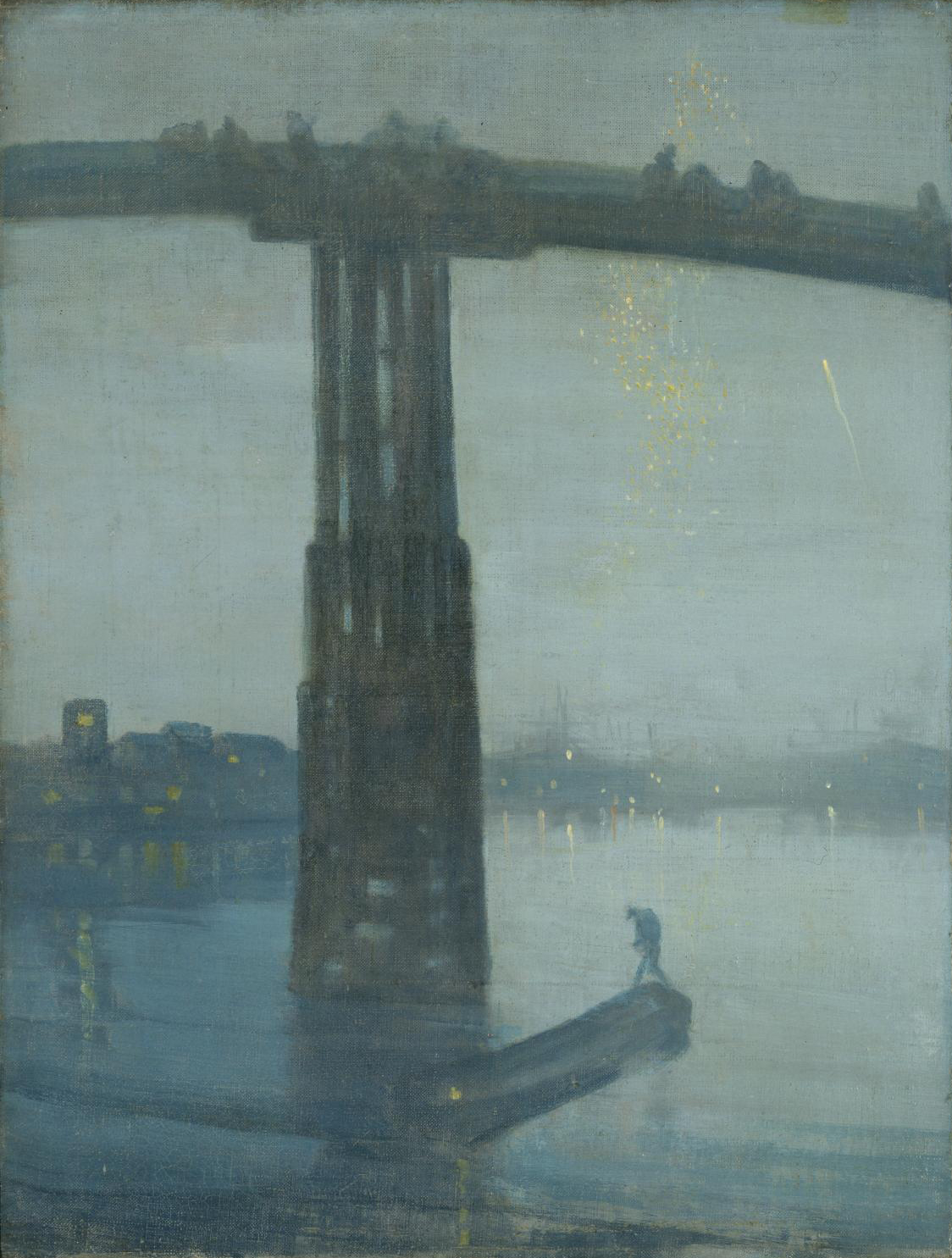
- Artist: James McNeill Whistler
- Year: c. 1872–1875
- Medium: Oil on canvas
- Dimensions: 68.3 cm × 51.2 cm (26 7/8 in × 20 1/8 in)
- Location: Tate Britain, London

Nocturne: Blue and Gold – Old Battersea Bridge is a painting by the American artist James McNeill Whistler, painted around 1872–1875. It depicts Old Battersea Bridge as seen from below. The blue tonality of the work is characteristic of Whistler's style at this time, creating a sense of atmosphere. The painting was discussed as part of the 1878 libel suit that Whistler brought against the art critic John Ruskin. In 1905, Nocturne: Blue and Gold became the first significant acquisition by the newly formed National Art Collections Fund and was presented to the Tate Gallery. It now hangs in Tate Britain.

== Background ==
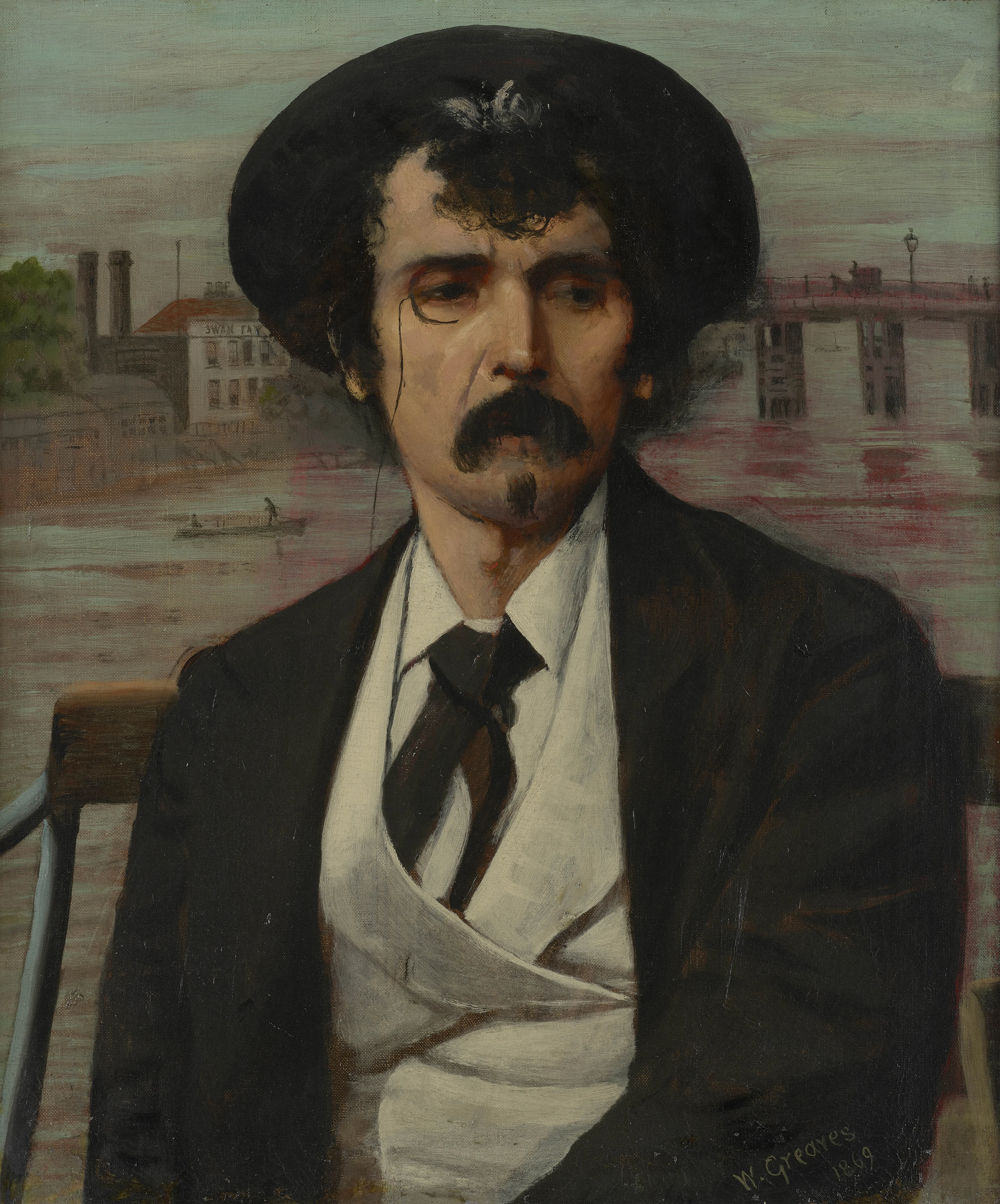
Portrait of Whistler by Walter Greaves 1869

James McNeill Whistler was an American painter with strong ties to France and England. A few years before the making of this piece Whistler's style underwent a transformation, combining elements of realism and formalism to create a new style now called Aestheticism. Many of Whistler's Nocturne paintings were done from memory or in studios overlooking the river. He felt that it was too difficult to capture the transient effects of light when working en plein air. Whistler wanted accurate portrayals of the river that were also visually appealing, tending to paint the river at night when it was not teeming with boats and people. He occasionally took a boat out on the river, often manned by the Greaves brothers, to sketch scenes he wished to paint later.

The precise dating of this painting remains a mystery. The Albert Bridge was not open to the public until 1873, and while the painting was first exhibited in 1875, Whistler himself said in 1877 that the painting was not complete.

== Composition ==
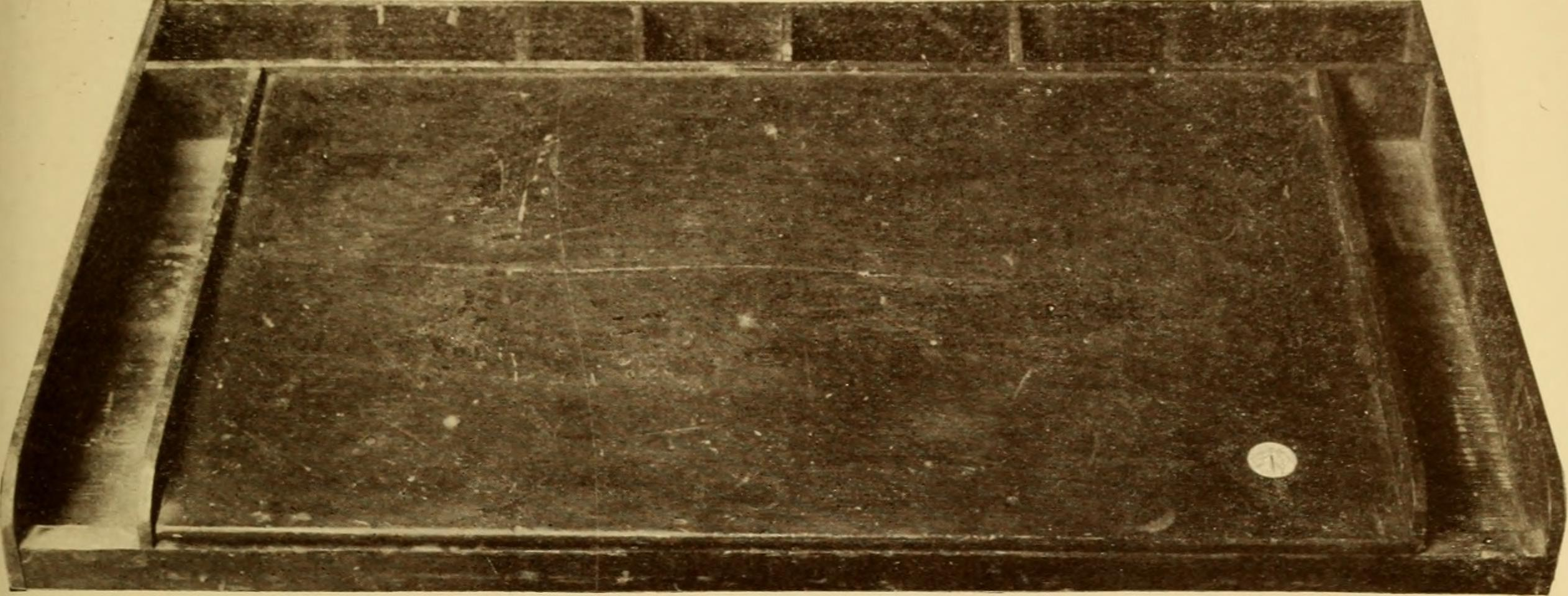
Whistler's table palette

This painting is of the old wooden Battersea Bridge seen from the River Thames. Chelsea Old Church stands on the left and the Albert Bridge to the right. The painting has a very strong blue tonality, with the shades used for the sky similar to the shades used for the sea. The cool tonality of the brown and gold shades used for the bridge pairs well with the overall blue composition. People can be seen on the bridge; on the water's surface, a boat and a lone man appear. Whistler exaggerated the height of the bridge. The buildings in the distance have lights on in the windows, suggesting it is either early morning or late at night. There is also a smattering of fireworks in the upper right-hand of the composition. Whistler's transient and ephemeral lighting techniques give the painting a hazy, atmospheric effect that also suggests the rapidness with which he painted.

== Materials ==
In painting his Nocturnes, Whistler created his own medium, a mixture consisting of copal, turpentine, and linseed oil that was so runny he often had to lay the canvas flat in order to keep the mixture from running off the surface. The Tate Gallery also has one of Whistler's palettes, whose remnants show that he mixed his main tones in a continuous gradation. Whistler kept his mixed paints in water so that he could continue his paintings another day. The color palette for his Nocturnes typically included Prussian blue and either French synthetic or natural ultramarine and his yellows were either chrome or cadmium yellow. His rigid color schemes allow for the identification of additions which is the case with some of the fireworks. A few were done in Naples yellow, a pigment not found anywhere else on the painting but in other works of his, suggesting that he may have revisited the work while painting another. Whistler favored ivory black but for his Nocturnes he used lamp black.

== Urban landscapes and musicality ==
Although Whistler grew up middle-class, he often spent evenings with London dock workers, the poorest of laborers, as a means of expressing his integrity and artistic freedom. Gustave Doré, a French engraver, often etched scenes similar to what Whistler would have encountered around the London docks. Where Whistler chose to paint the serene water, Doré captured the reality of the new industrial environment. In attempting to paint aesthetic, picturesque images, Whistler often overlooked the daily struggles lived by the lower class.

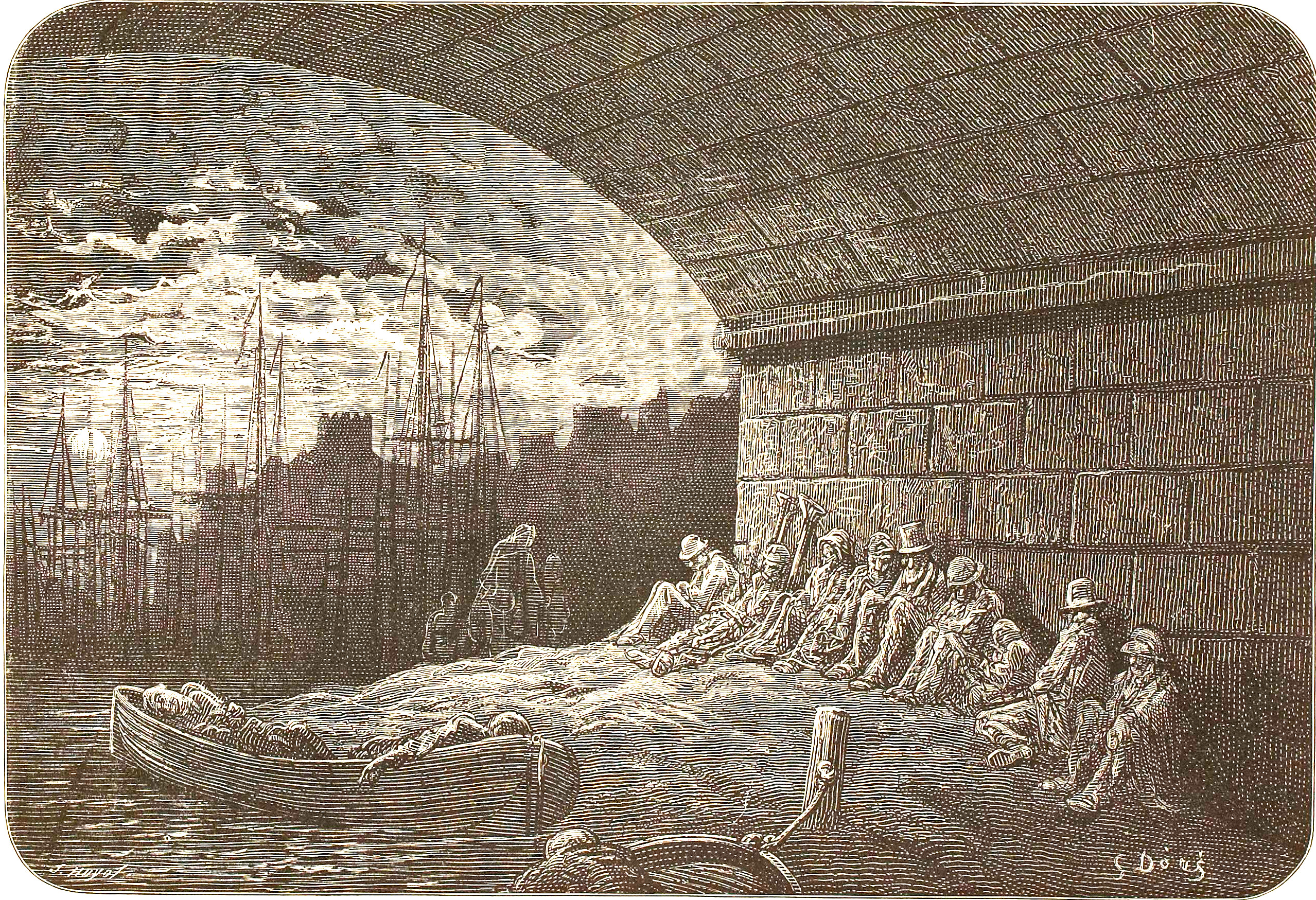
Under the Arches, Gustave Doré, in London: A Pilgrimage

Whistler often named his series along musical lines, and the atmospheric nature of his Nocturne series stems from his view of color as a composition. A musical nocturne is a single movement piano solo that was meant to invoke the mood of night; Whistler traveled in such circles where he would have been familiar with these pieces. His processes for painting Nocturnes were similar to the processes of music composition, such as interpretation, memorization, repetition, and performance. Whistler would stare at his chosen scene and then, upon turning his back, would recite the arrangement to a listener who would correct any mistake. Whistler would then go to bed, and if the image remained in his head in the morning, he painted it. Whistler described his Nocturnes as arrangements of line, form, and color in the same way musical compositions are arrangements of notes. Oscar Wilde also wrote a poem that was published in 1881, the year he met Whistler, describing the same scene shown in the Nocturne, linking the various modes of art making.

== Controversy ==
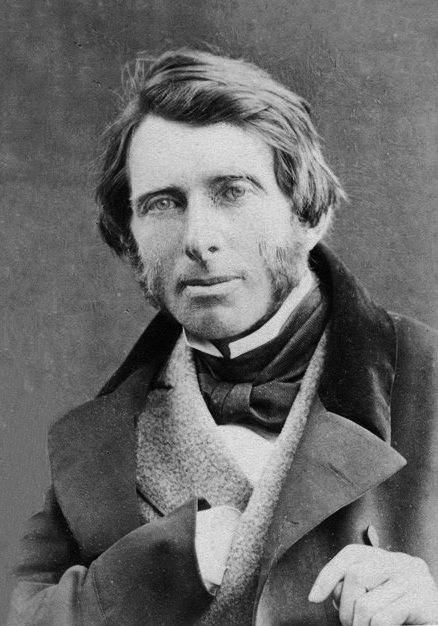
John Ruskin

Whistler's Nocturne series, of which this painting was a part, achieved notoriety in 1877, when influential critic John Ruskin visited an exhibition of the series at the Grosvenor Gallery. He wrote of the exhibition that Whistler was "asking two hundred guineas for flinging a pot of paint in the public's face." Whistler sued for libel, and the case reached the courts in 1878. In a series of questions by Judge Baron Huddleston, Whistler admitted he painted the scene between two days and that its content depended on whoever was looking at it. The Attorney General believed that if Whistler did not want to be questioned, he should not have exhibited his work and that Ruskin had a right to his comment. The case ended with Whistler awarded token damages of one farthing.

== See also ==
- List of paintings by James McNeill Whistler
