= Caversham Bridge =

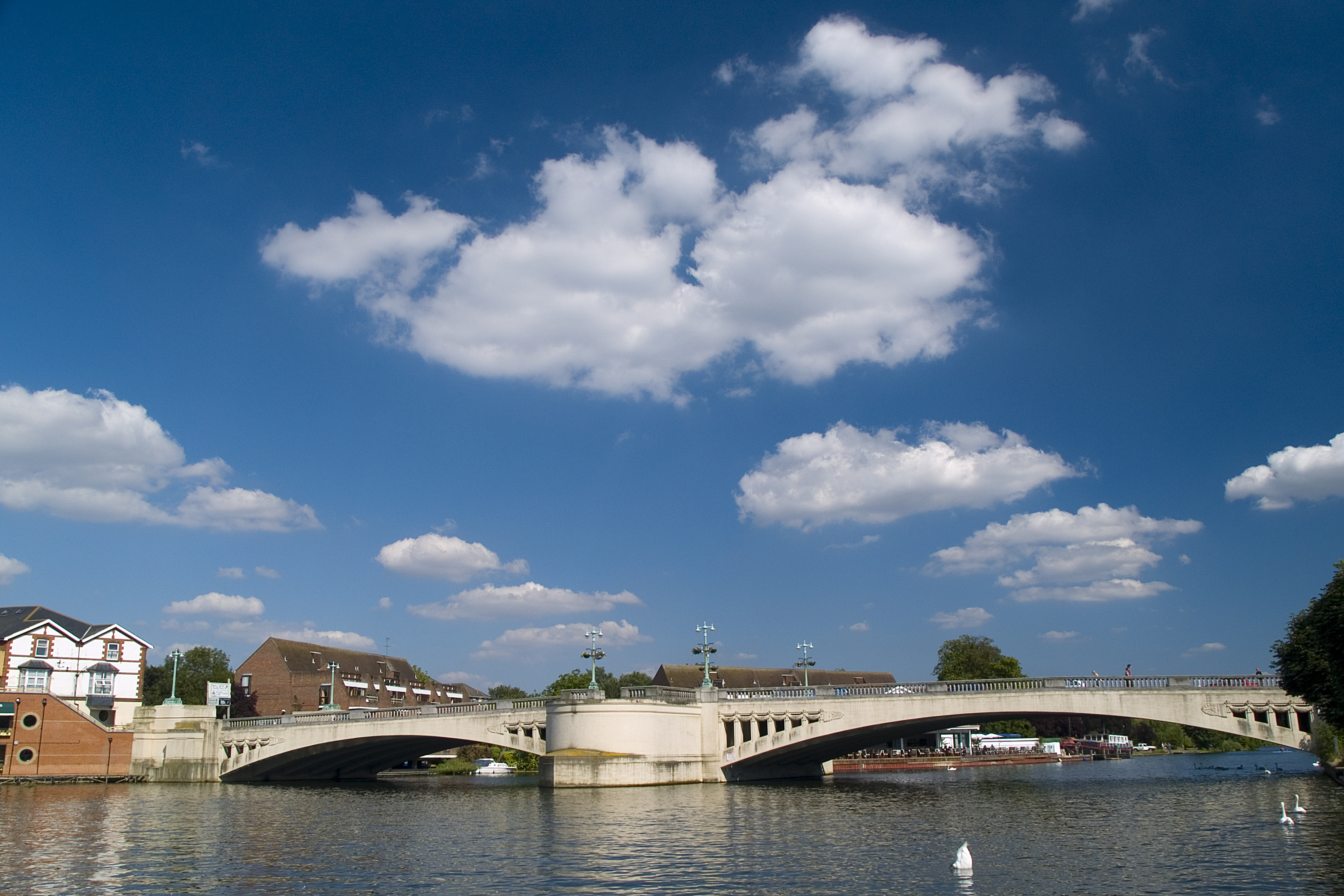
- Caversham Bridge
- Coordinates: 51°27′57″N 0°58′38″W
- Carries: A4155 road
- Crosses: River Thames
- Locale: Reading

Characteristics
- Design: Arch
- Material: Concrete/Granite
- Height: 15 feet 0 inches (4.57 m)
- No. of spans: 2
- Piers in water: 1

History
- Opened: 1926

Location
- Interactive map of Caversham Bridge

Caversham Bridge is a bridge across the River Thames between Caversham and the town centre of Reading. The bridge is situated on the reach above Caversham Lock, carrying the A4155 road across the river and also providing pedestrian access to the adjacent mid-river Pipers Island.

The first bridge on the site was built sometime between 1163, when a famous trial by combat was fought on nearby De Montfort Island, and 1231, when Henry III wrote to the Sheriff of Oxfordshire, commanding him:

"to go in person, taking with him good and lawful men of his county, to the chapel of St Anne on the bridge at Reading over the Thames one side of which is built on the fee of William Earl Marshal and by the view and testimony of those men see that the abbot has the same seisin of the said chapel as he had on the day the said earl died."

William Marshal was the first Earl of Pembroke, the principal landowner in the Caversham area, and regent during the early years of Henry's reign. He had died at his home at Caversham Park in 1218.

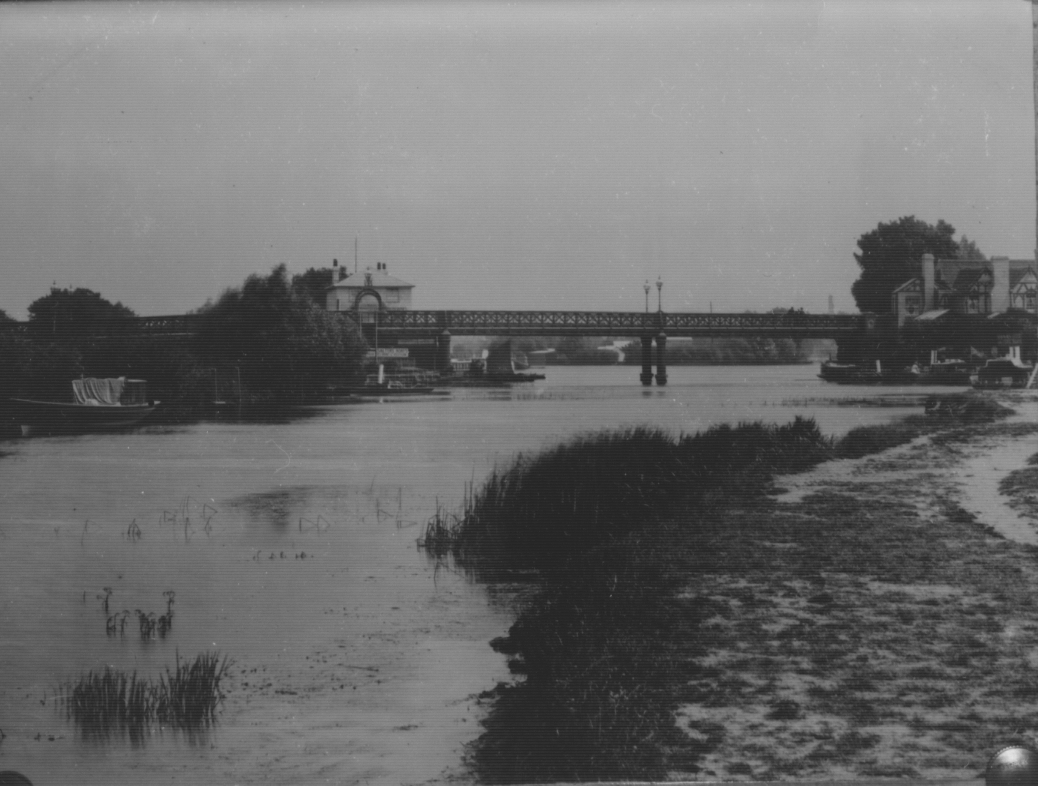
The previous Caversham Bridge c. 1900 by Henry Taunt

The old bridge was the site of a skirmish during the English Civil War in 1643 and was left with a wooden drawbridge structure on the Berkshire half. The bridge was still in this state when it was depicted by Joseph Mallord William Turner in 1806/7, in a painting entitled Caversham Bridge with Cattle in the Water.

In 1869, the entire bridge was replaced by an iron lattice construction. When Reading Bridge was completed in 1923 work began on replacing Caversham Bridge with the current structure which is of concrete with a granite balustrade. It was opened in 1926 by Edward Prince of Wales.

Since late 2018, Caversham bridge has featured on the club crest of local football team Caversham United Football Club.

== See also ==
- Crossings of the River Thames

Next bridge upstream	River Thames	Next bridge downstream
Reading Festival Bridge (intermittently present); Whitchurch Bridge (toll road)	Caversham Bridge; Grid reference SU711746	Christchurch Bridge
