= Heron Island, Berkshire =

Island on the River Thames

Coordinates: 51.4627°N 0.9616°W

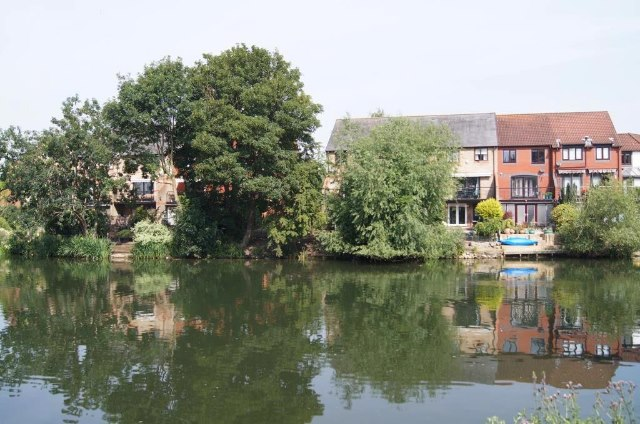
Houses on Heron Island

Heron Island is a small island near Caversham Lock, on the north bank of the River Thames at Reading, Berkshire in England.

The island has private riverside housing and is connected by road to Lower Caversham. It also connects by footpath to View Island just upstream, relaxing island set out as a small park with grassy paths and seating, a pond, and several wooden chain-saw carved sculptures. This in turn connects via a weir to De Bohun Island, where Caversham Lock is located, and on to the south bank of the River Thames.

== See also ==
- Islands in the River Thames

Next island upstream	River Thames	Next island downstream
View Island	Heron Island, Berkshire	Sonning Hill island
