= Caversham Lock =

Lock and weir on the River Thames in Berkshire, England

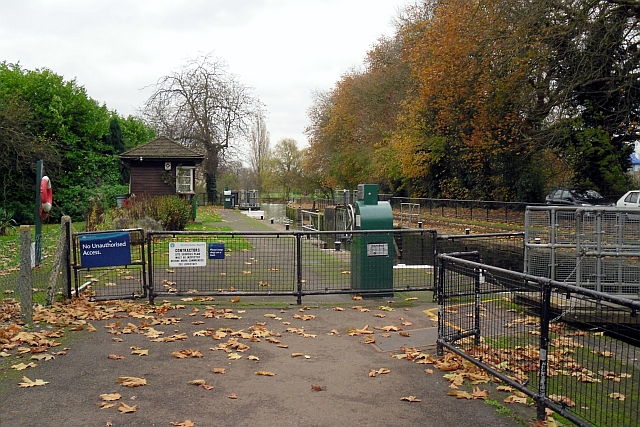
- Caversham lock in 2012
- Interactive map of Caversham Lock
- 51.4607°N 0.9641°W
- Waterway: River Thames
- County: Berkshire
- Maintained by: Environment Agency
- Operation: Hydraulic
- First built: 1778
- Latest built: 1875
- Length: 40.03 m (131 ft 4 in)
- Width: 5.46 m (17 ft 11 in)
- Fall: 1.82 m (6 ft 0 in)
- Above sea level: 120'
- Distance to Teddington Lock: 55 miles

Caversham Lock is a lock and main weir on the River Thames in England at Reading, Berkshire. Both the lock and main weir are connected to De Bohun Island (colloquially known as Lock Island). The Thames Navigation Commissioners built the original lock in 1778. Additional sluices north of View Island and Heron Island form the whole weir complex. A footbridge, known as The Clappers, passes over the weir and all three islands to connect Lower Caversham to Reading.

The weir is upstream of the lock and in the mid-channel. Kings Meadow, Reading, and buildings comprising homes and office blocks adjoin to the south of the lock itself. The island contains a typical lock-keeper's house, a crane depot, small boatyard, and large boathouse owned by the Environment Agency for occasional use by that authority and police in river patrol and maintenance of boats.

The head of water provided by the weir is used by Reading Hydro to generate up to 46 kW of electricity.

== History ==
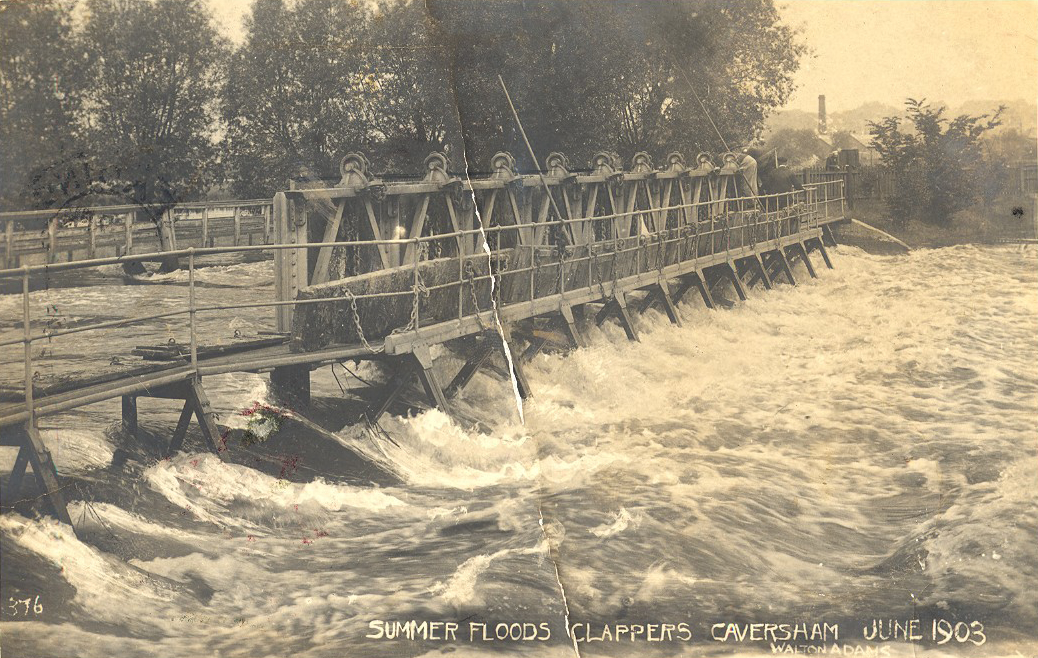
Caversham Weir in 1903

A weir, mill, ferry, and flash lock on the site were referenced in 1493 when granted to Notley Abbey. The pound lock opened in 1778, but the long promised lock house was not built until after 1819. In 1871 Reading Corporation planned to build a swing bridge over the lock upstream, but did not implement the plan. The lock was rebuilt in 1875.

== Access to and across the lock ==
The lock is about 400 metres east of Reading railway station and well connected to Kings Meadow, the largest park of central Reading.

Access to the north is to part of the Lower Caversham neighborhood of the former village of Caversham (considered a Reading suburb administratively since it joined the Borough of Reading), and the route is open as a public footpath.

== Beyond the lock ==
Soon after the lock, there is Reading Bridge followed by Fry's Island in the middle of the river. The built-up part of Reading stretches 500m (on the southern side) to Caversham Bridge. A gangway spans from Reading to Pipers Island, with a restaurant that covers more than 75% of the gangway.

The northern bank passes by Caversham. St Mary's Island is close to the bank at the far end of Caversham (seen on maps also as Upper and Lower Large). Further west of St Mary's Island, Mapledurham House comes into view as the river continues almost northwards towards Mapledurham Lock.

Reading Amateur Regatta is held annually in June between St Mary's Island and Caversham Bridge. Reading Festival is held on August Bank Holiday at Little John's Farm on Richfield Avenue near Caversham Bridge. A temporary structure called Reading Festival Bridge links the site with parking and camping areas along the north bank open meadows during the festival. In these areas the Chiltern Hills can be seen in the background.

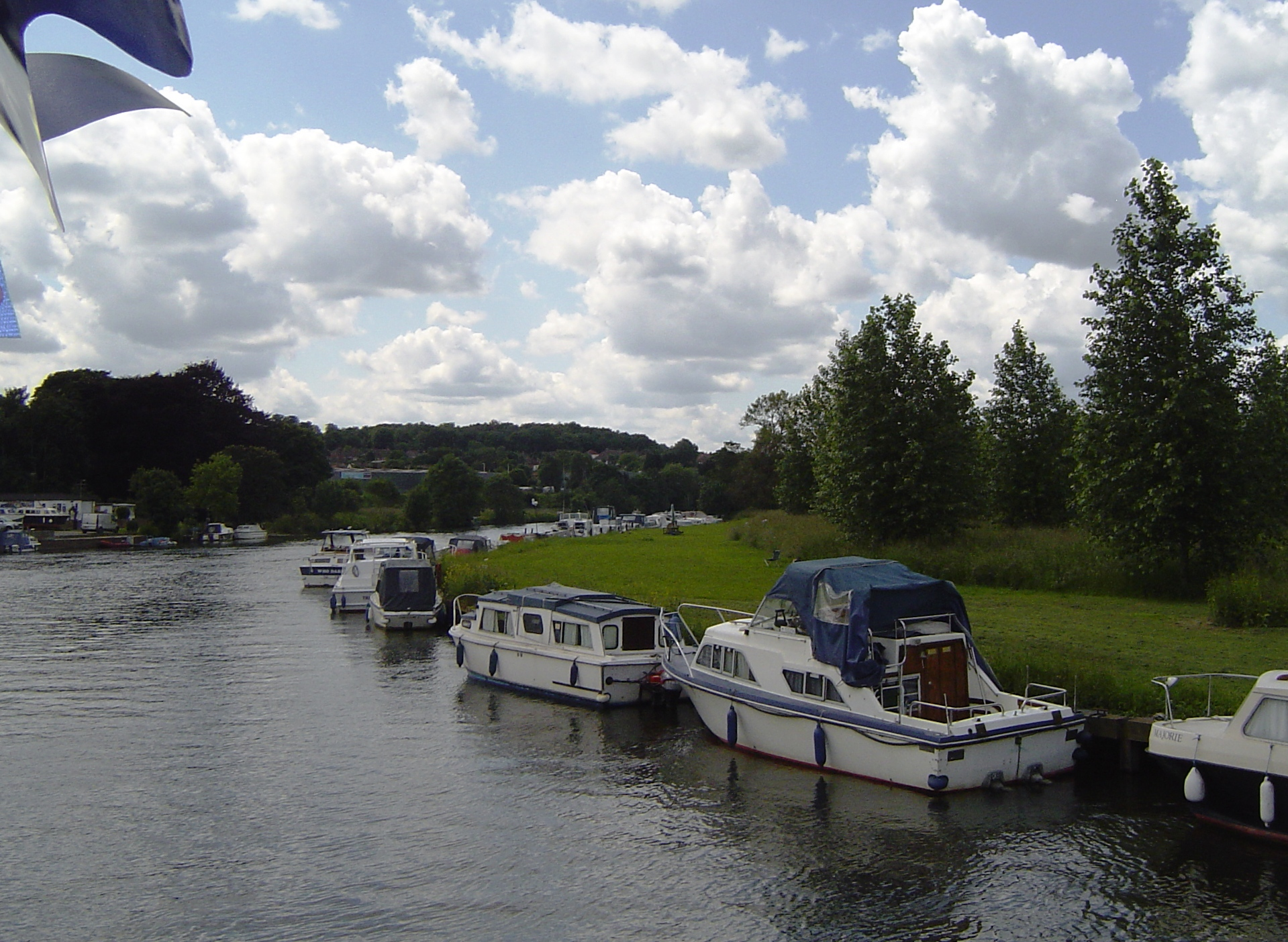
View as the channel veers north-west by Tilehurst and Purley

On the south bank, after the farmed meadows, is Tilehurst, where the river veers briefly north with the two islands of Appletree Eyot and Poplar Island in the center of the river. The railway runs adjacent to the river for more than 600 meters on a high brick embankment to enable it to cut through the end of the escarpment further upstream, on which most of Purley-on-Thames lies.

The Thames Path follows the southern bank until Tilehurst, then diverts away from the river through Purley-on-Thames, rejoining the river at Mapledurham Lock. Another footpath follows the north bank between Reading and Caversham bridges. There is an orphan section of the original towpath on the north bank 1 km downstream of Mapledurham Lock, inaccessible except by boat.

=== Sports clubs ===
- Reading Rowing Club
- Reading Canoe Club

== See also ==
- Islands in the River Thames
- Locks on the River Thames
- Crossings of the River Thames

Next lock upstream	River Thames	Next lock downstream
Mapledurham Lock; 7.08 km (4.40 mi)	Caversham Lock; Grid reference SU718740	Sonning Lock; 4.23 km (2.63 mi)
Next bridge upstream	River Thames	Next bridge downstream
Reading Bridge	Caversham Lock; Grid reference SU718740	Sonning Bridge & Sonning Backwater Bridges
Next island upstream	River Thames	Next island downstream
Fry's Island	De Bohun Island; Grid reference SU718740	View Island
