= Sonning Hill =

Hill in Berkshire, England

Coordinates: 51.470°N 0.907°W

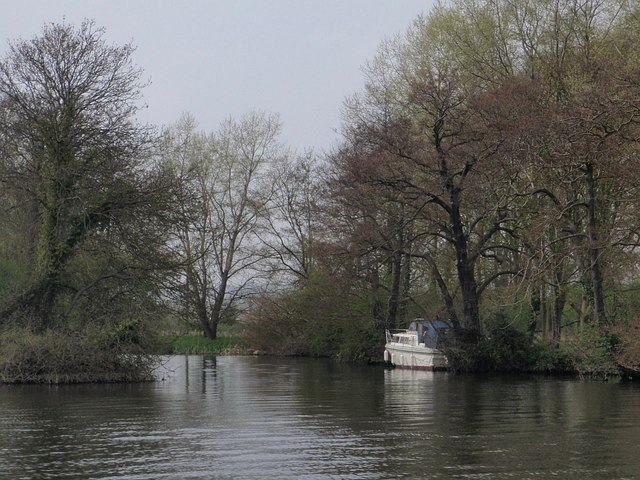
The River Thames near Sonning Hill.

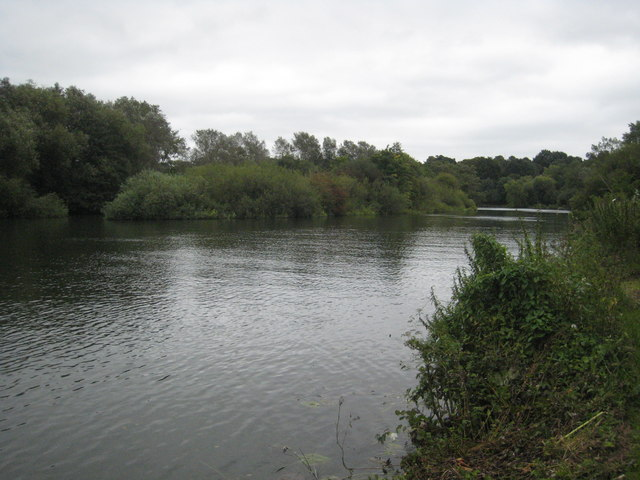
The island in the Thames near Sonning Hill.

Sonning Hill is a hill near the village of Sonning in Berkshire, England, close to the River Thames. Towards the Oxfordshire side of the main river channel, there is a long thin island creating two branches of the river. The Sonning Cutting takes the Great Western Railway through part of the hill between Twyford and Reading.

There are good walks by the river in this area. At the foot of the hill by the Thames is Ali's Pond Local Nature Reserve, a nature reserve laid out with paths and large ponds in 1997.

The UK headquarters of two major software companies, Microsoft and Oracle Corporation are also located here on the Thames Valley Park business park.

== See also ==
- Islands in the River Thames

Next island upstream	River Thames	Next island downstream
Heron Island	Sonning Hill	Sonning Eye
