= Poplar Island, River Thames =

Island in the River Thames, England

Coordinates: 51.4686°N 1.0219°W

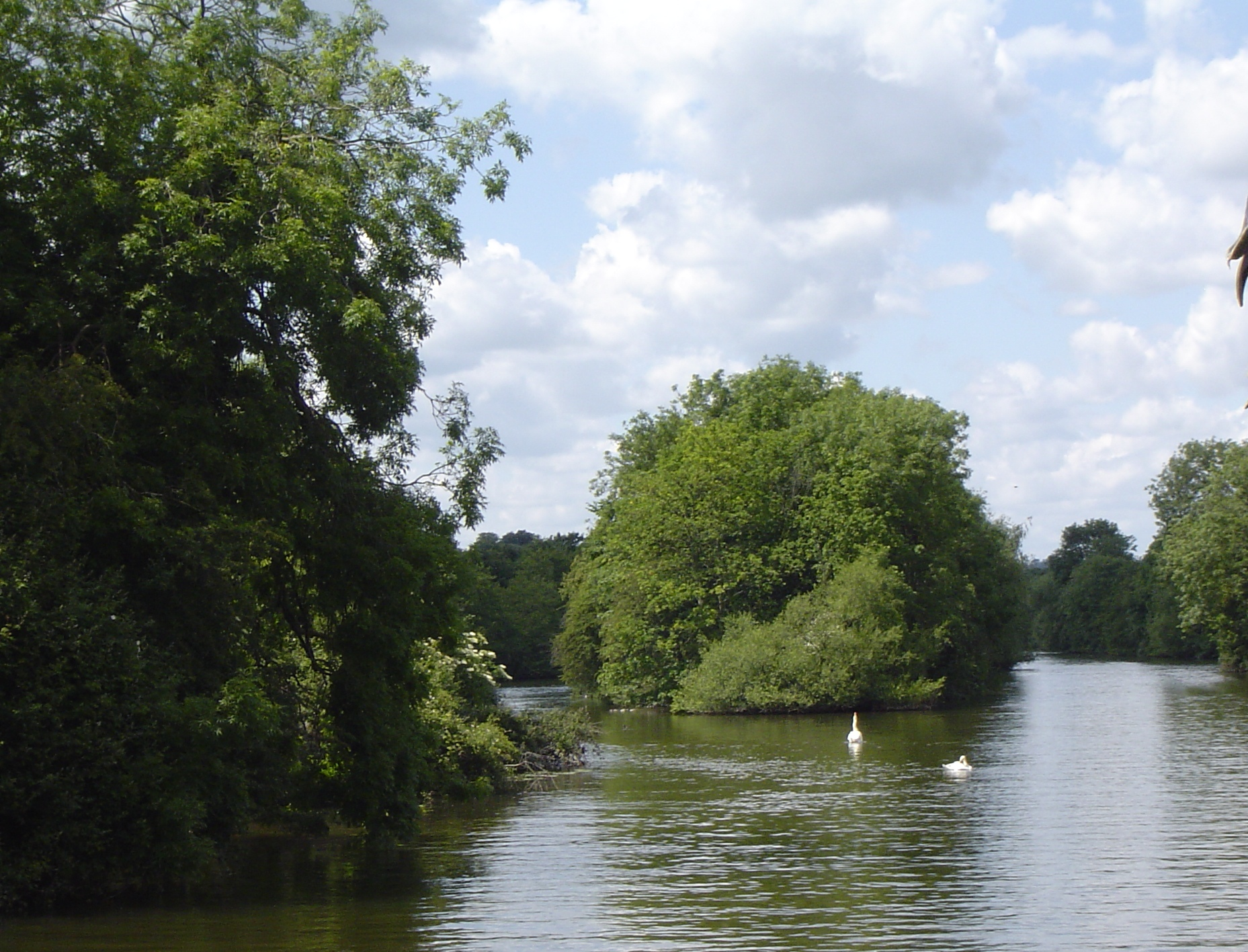
Poplar Island from downstream.

Poplar Island is an island in the River Thames in Oxfordshire, England.

The island is on the reach above Caversham Lock near Tilehurst, a suburb of Reading. Appletree Eyot is very close to it. The two islands are in the middle of the river, so that navigation goes to each side of them according to the rules of the river. Poplar Island is densely covered by trees.

== See also ==
- Islands in the River Thames

Next island upstream	River Thames	Next island downstream
Nag's Head Island	Poplar Island, River Thames	Appletree Eyot
