= Grass Eyot =

Island in the River Thames, England

Coordinates: 51.5290°N 0.7005°W

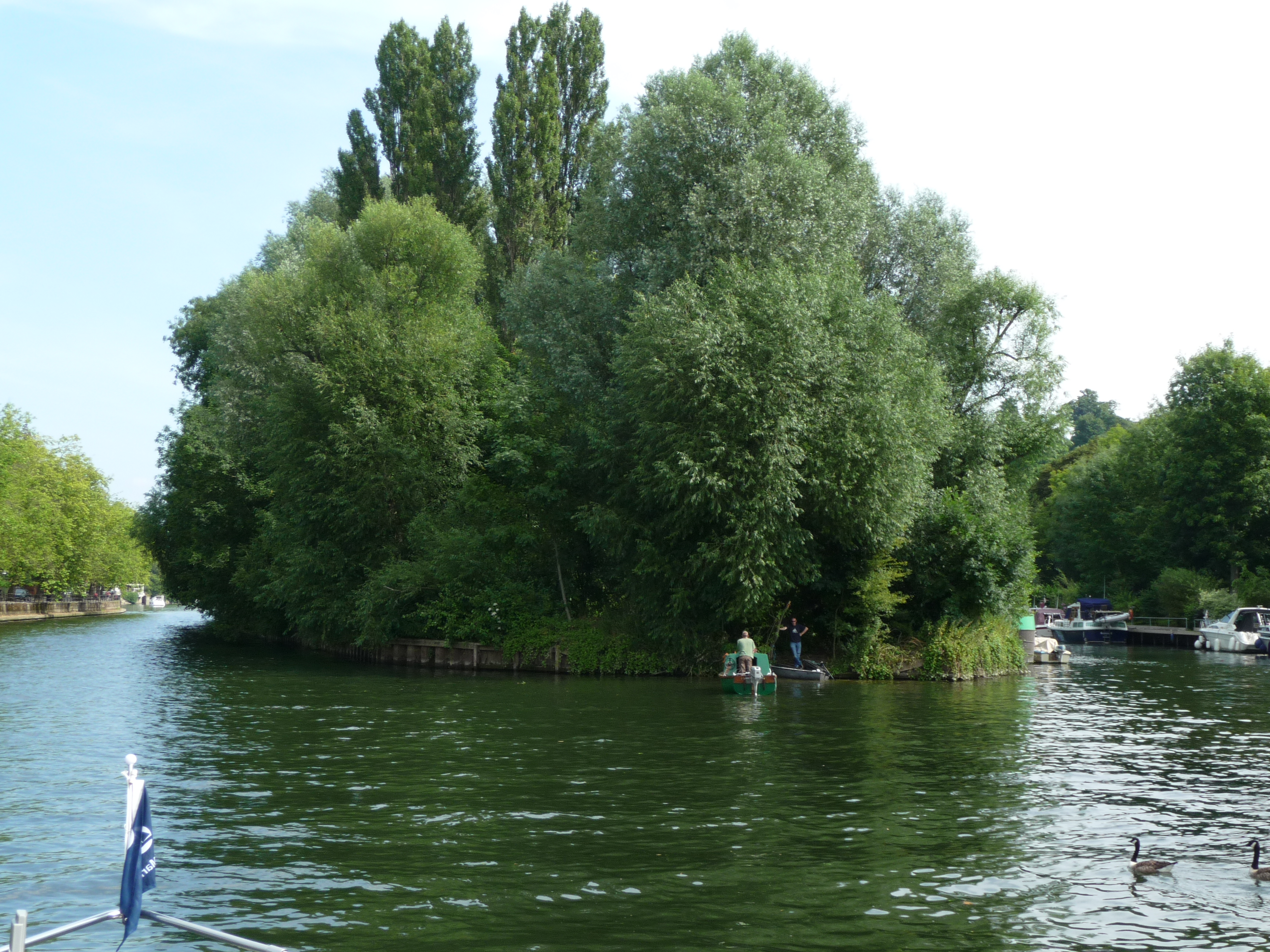
Grass Eyot looking upstream

Grass Eyot is an island in the River Thames in England above Maidenhead Bridge on the reach above Bray Lock, near Maidenhead, Berkshire.

Out of accordance with its name, the island is tree-covered and there is a very small island between it and Bridge Eyot just downstream.

== See also ==
- Islands in the River Thames

Next island upstream	River Thames	Next island downstream
Ray Mill Island	Grass Eyot	Bridge Eyot
