= Guards Club Island =

Coordinates: 51.5217°N 0.7020°W

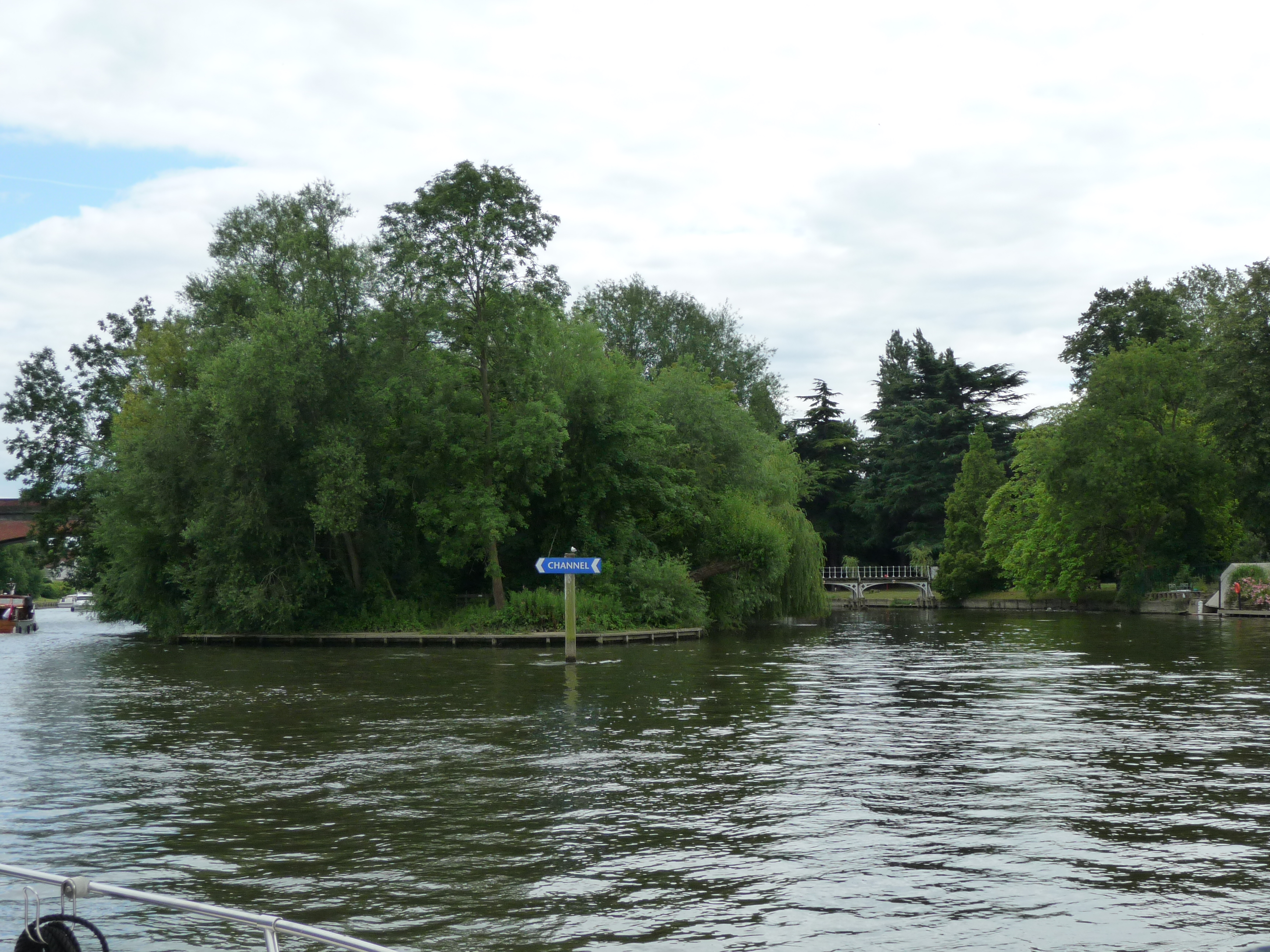
Guards Club Island (upstream side) showing Guards Club Island Bridge and Guards Club Park to the right

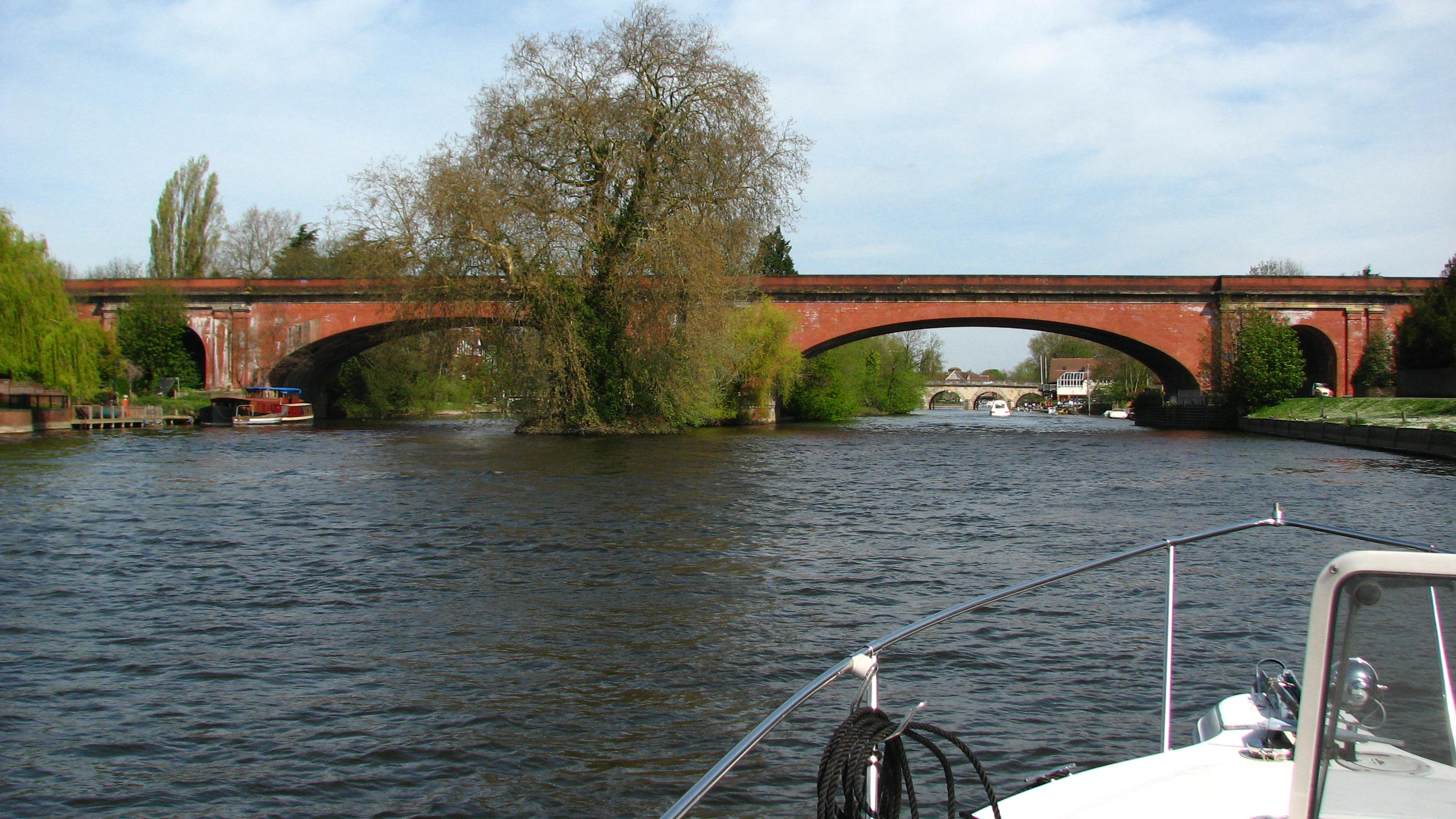
Guards Club Island (downstream side) and Maidenhead Railway Bridge with Maidenhead Bridge beyond

Guards Club Island, also known as Bucks Ait or bucks' eyot, is an island in the River Thames connected by footbridge to Maidenhead, Berkshire accommodating a pier adjoining the Sounding Arch part of the railway bridge which was built in 1838 to designs by Brunel. The thin small island is connected to Guards Club Park by a low cast-iron and wood footbridge which blocks the near channel (backwater) to boat navigation apart from kayaks. The island gets its alternative name from eel bucks from which the footbridge was adapted in 1865 to allow access to its Guards Club Boathouse (since demolished).

The island is special status part of Guards Club Park (a public open space). Access to the island, a nesting site for water fowl, is restricted between December and June.

== See also ==
- Islands in the River Thames
- Ait

Next island upstream	River Thames	Next island downstream
Bridge Eyot	Guards Club Island	Headpile Eyot
