= Hamhaugh Island =

Island in the River Thames in Surrey, England

Coordinates: 51°22′49″N 00°27′38″W

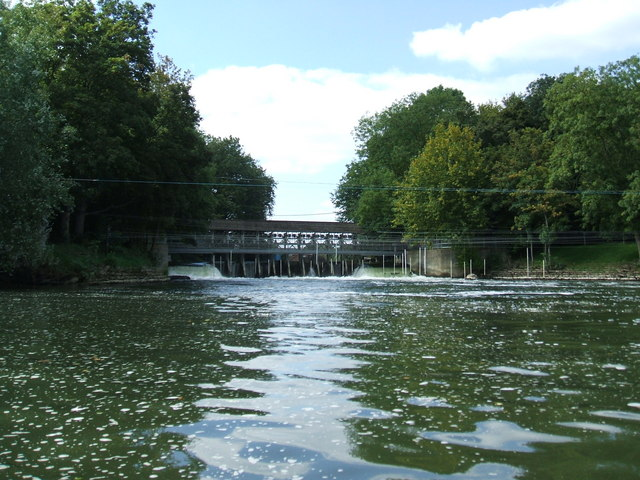
A weir across the Thames, passing Hamhaugh Island (left)

Hamhaugh Island is an island, historically known simply as Stadbury, in the River Thames in England south of Shepperton Lock, in Shepperton, Surrey.

== Position ==
The island is at the southernmost point of the River Thames. The garden-lined southern horseshoe curve of the island is mapped as Hamhaugh Point, and being its only tapered side becomes the narrowest width. Otherwise Hamhaugh is almost rectangular: 690 metres (2,260 ft) long and 100–120 metres (330–390 ft) wide. It is 800 metres (2,600 ft) from the parish churches of Shepperton and Weybridge respectively, however Shepperton High Street is a further 400 metres (1,300 ft) north of this whereas Weybridge High Street runs next to its parish church, which means the whole area is closer to Weybridge's urban resources.

The town is accessible by boat or a journey, using Walton Bridge, of more than 3 miles (4.8 km). The Shepperton Lock area of Old Shepperton has a family gastropub, two marine shops/chandler's shops and the lock's indoor and outdoor tea room.

=== Crossing the river ===
A ferry operates from Shepperton Lock's downstream side to the northern point of Weybridge and links the Thames Path National Trail. A fee of £3 one way or £5 round trip is payable.

== Land use ==
The island, apart from landings (boats' hardstanding) and a patch of woodland with a path running through it along the north side, is residential, consisting of 46 houses and a communal green. Access is on foot or carried bicycle from Shepperton lock, across Lock Island and then across a weir. A second weir, without foot access, connects the island to the right bank: Hamm Point of the Hamm Court residential estate, Addlestone.

== History ==
The island was created and soon thereafter slightly reduced to create a smaller island, Lock Island, to the north, which was also part of the mainland — this creation occurred after the fixing of most non-urban parish boundaries, pre-1700, and explains why given the wide channel dug to its north (almost equal width of the widest river course to all other sides), it stayed part of the parish of Shepperton.

Before the later Thames locks including all those of the mid- to lower Thames (such as from Windsor down to Teddington) were built from 1805 onward, the river here saw flooding across what was a combined island, at various points such as the far north in times of very high tide, when combined with post-rainfall water volumes, this being similar to Penton Hook Island and Desborough Island which were also originally peninsulas. With the additional capacity and cuts along this stretch this acts to bypass the old river when necessary and makes navigation much shorter for river journeys.

"Breaches in the banks at Stadbury (Hamhaugh Island) were repaired in the 18th century by the City of London authorities, who were responsible for...[the river downstream of the north-west of Staines]. They also had occasion to remove illegal fish-weirs: there had been a weir at Shepperton in 1086 and one is mentioned in the 14th century."

== See also ==
- Islands in the River Thames

| Next island upstream | River Thames | Next island downstream |
| Pharaoh's Island | Hamhaugh Island; Lock Island; Grid reference TQ071656 | D'Oyly Carte Island |
