= Sonning Cutting =

Railway cutting in Berkshire, England

Coordinates: 51.46174°N 0.91318°W

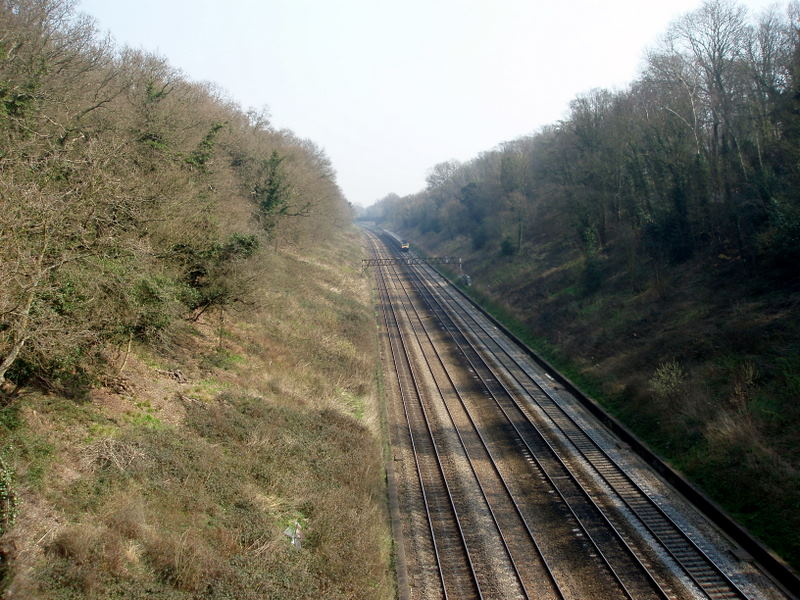
View of Sonning Cutting.

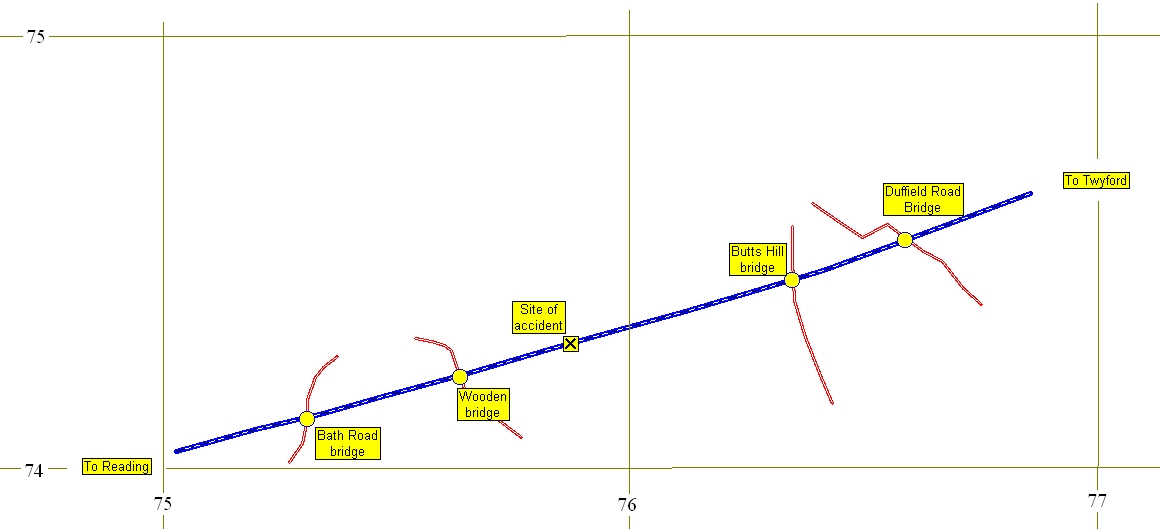
Map of Sonning Cutting. (The grid lines are at intervals of 1,000 metres.)

Sonning Cutting is on the original Great Western Railway built by Isambard Kingdom Brunel. It is to the east of Reading station and to the west of Twyford station near the village of Sonning in Berkshire, England. Originally planned to route around the north of Sonning Hill past the village, the railway instead bypasses the village due to local objections. The resulting route follows a cutting over 1-mile (1.6 km) and up to 60 feet (18 m) deep, through the hill, giving a more direct route between Twyford and Reading.

The cutting was hand-dug without machinery and the spoil removed in wheelbarrows and horse-drawn carts. It took two years to complete and there were several casualties in the process. The line was opened on 30 March 1840.

After the ending of the broad gauge in 1892, the railway was widened to four tracks. This involved a major rebuilding of the cutting, during which the slope of the sides was reduced.

== Accident ==
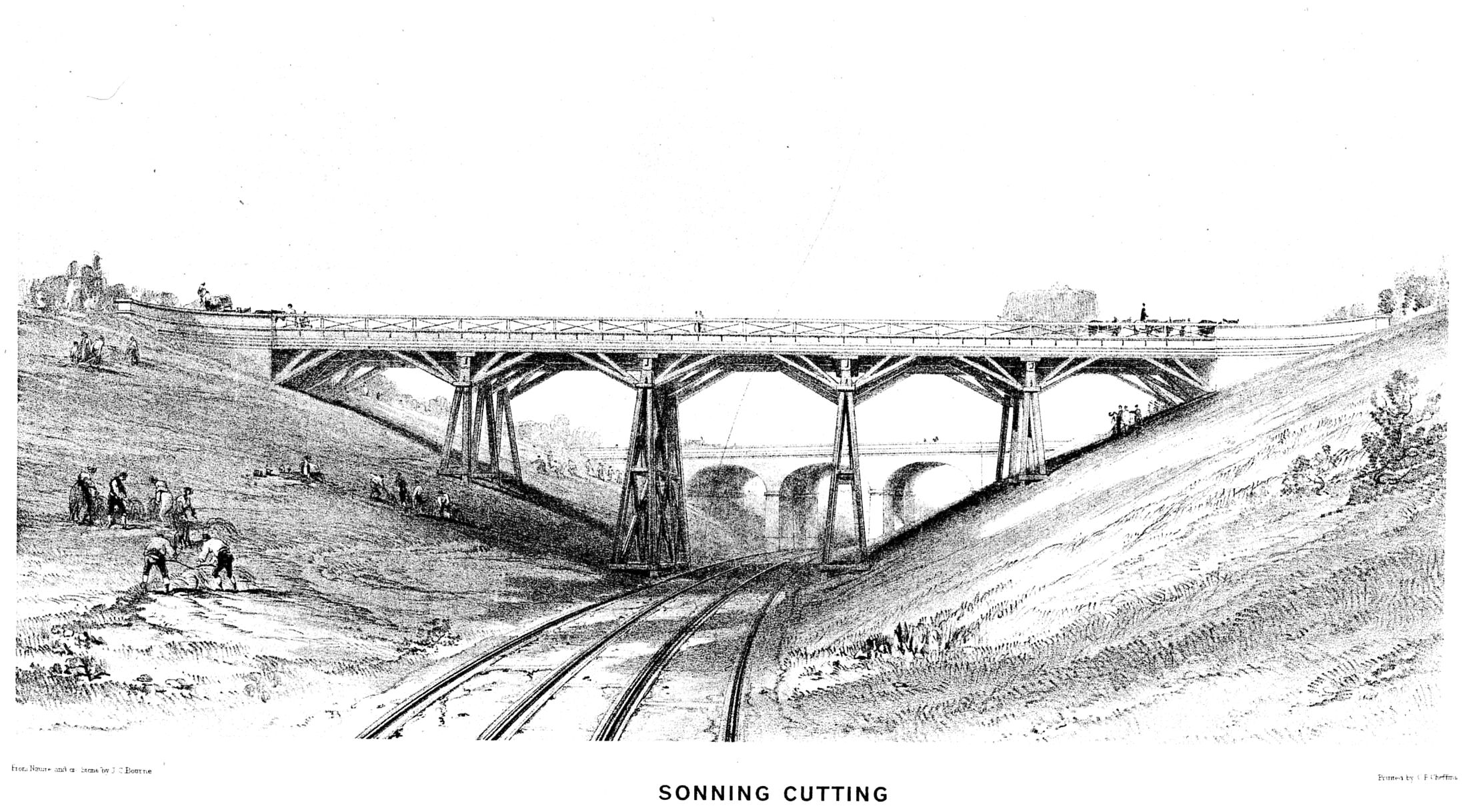
View of Sonning Cutting in 1846.

Early on 24 December 1841, a mixed goods and passenger train ran into a landslide in the cutting, caused by earlier persistent heavy rain. Many passengers who were carried in open-topped wagons were thrown out or crushed between the wagons. Eight people died there and seventeen, one of whom died later, were injured. Among the casualties were artisans returning home after working on the new Parliament building. The tragedy stimulated William Ewart Gladstone, while President of the Board of Trade (1843–1845), to introduce legislation to improve safety on the railways.

== See also ==
- List of rail accidents in the United Kingdom § 1830–1922: Pre-grouping
