= Lock Island =

Island in the River Thames, England

Coordinates: 51°22′54″N 00°27′31″W

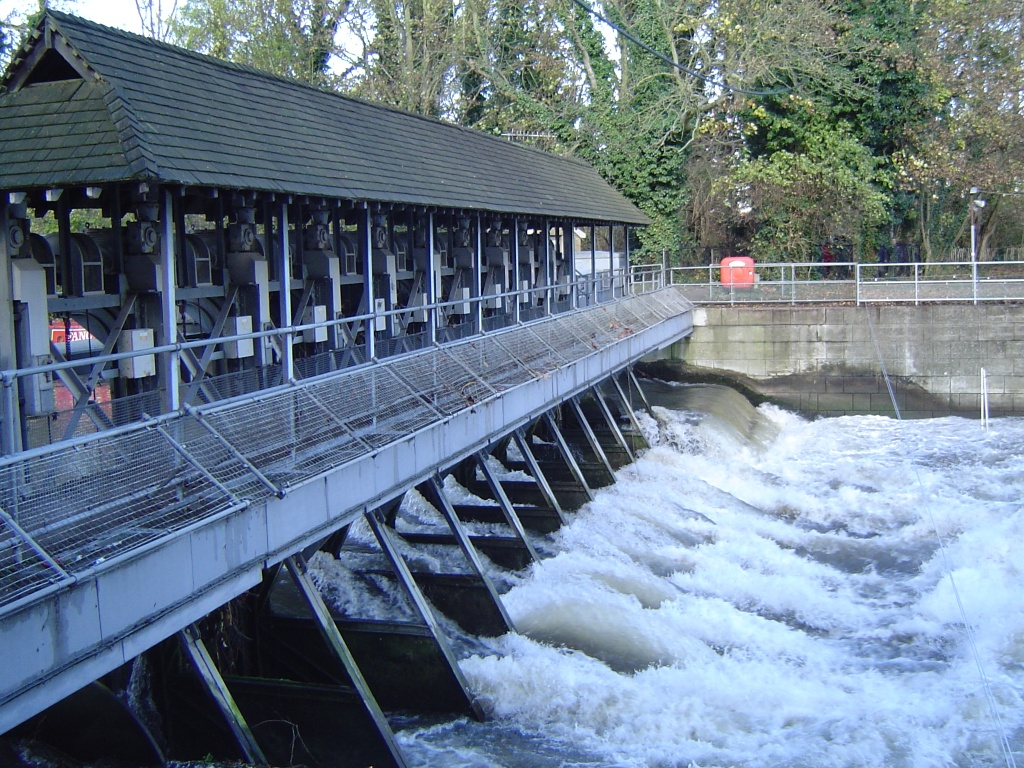
Lock Island across the weir from Hamhaugh Island

Lock Island is an island in the River Thames in England connected to Shepperton Lock, near Shepperton. Facing the attached by lock-gate bridge mainland is a hedge-lined lawn hosting a café, below and above zones of free short-stay moorings. The Thames River Police have a station on the island. Shepperton Canoe Club and Weybridge Mariners' Boat Club face part of the Weybridge side. The island is connected to Hamhaugh Island by a walkway across the main weir, in turn having a closed-access weir to Hamm Court, Addlestone.

== History ==
Lock Island was uninhabited until the late 19th century, when some people from London moved there due to the unhealthy environment of the city. During the Blitz, a few families moved to the island and stayed there, with their descendants living in the few homes (all in the east of the island) such as Lock House.

== Environment ==
The west of the island is undisturbed wilderness, and is home to a population of European water voles.

A little of the island has been a boat store, given permission in 1982.

== See also ==
- Islands in the River Thames

Next island upstream	River Thames	Next island downstream
Pharaoh's Island	Lock Island & Hamhaugh Island	D'Oyly Carte Island
