= D'Oyly Carte Island =

Private island in the River Thames, near London

Coordinates: 51°22′58″N 00°27′15″W

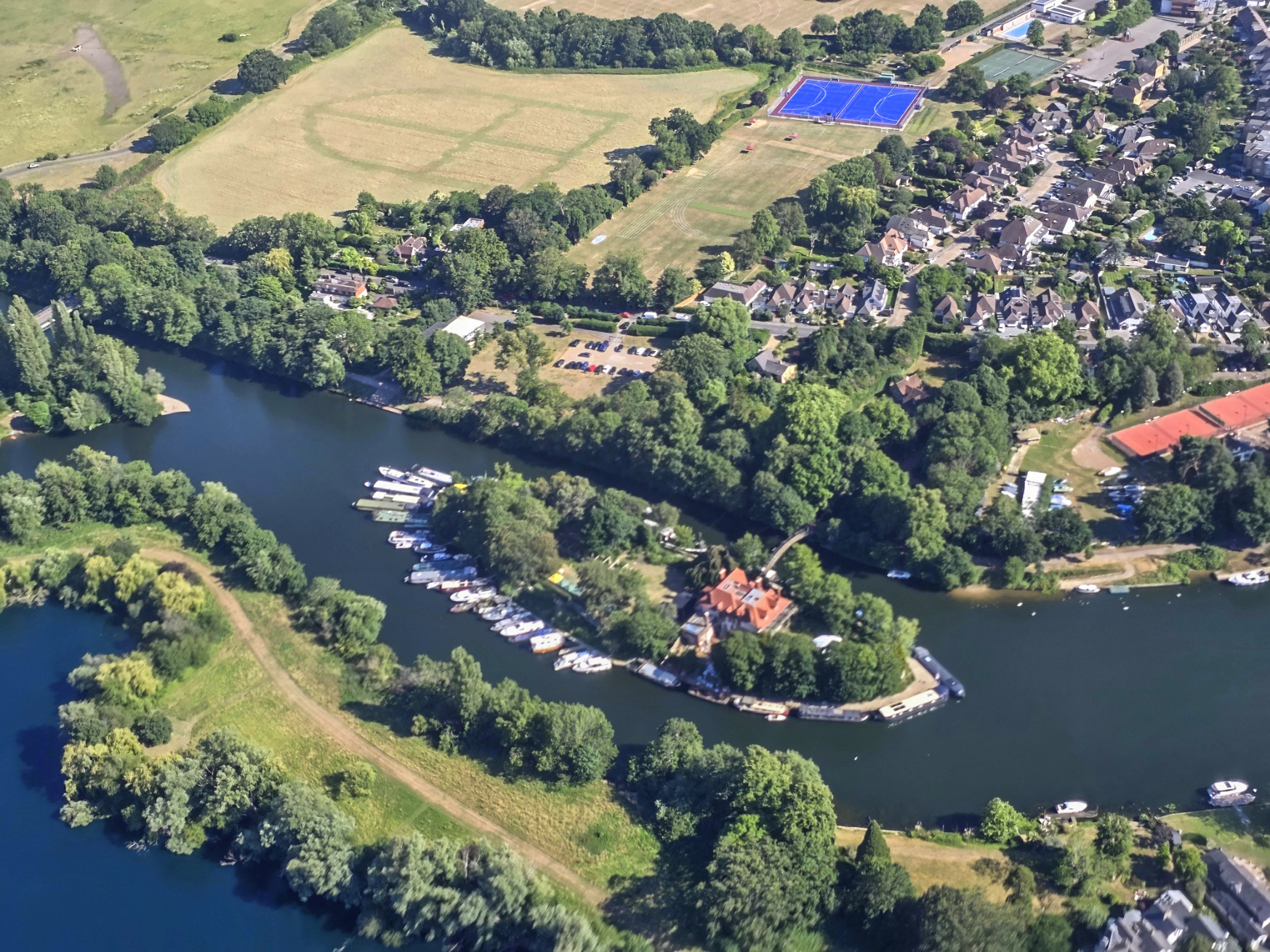
Aerial photograph of the island from the north-west

Shepperton, showing D'Oyly Carte Island near the bottom, just north of Weybridge

D'Oyly Carte Island is a small private island in the River Thames, England, administratively and historically part of Weybridge, near its other inhabited islands and near part of Old Shepperton, on the reach above Sunbury Lock, 200 metres downstream from Shepperton Lock. Before 1890 the island was known as Folly Eyot. The impresario Richard D'Oyly Carte bought the island in about 1890 and built the 13-bedroom Eyot House on the property, completed in 1898. His widow sold the island, and it was last sold in 2021.

== Geography ==
The wooded island is 145 metres (159 yd) in length, and apart from its two points, 30 to 45 metres in width. It is 16.8 miles (27.0 km) from Charing Cross, London. Weybridge is the parish and post town. Elmbridge and Surrey County Council are the district and county-level local authorities.

== Etymology ==
The island was called Folly Eyot until the eponymous owner bought it. Richard D'Oyly Carte was the producer of the Gilbert and Sullivan comic operas from 1875 to 1896, founder of the Savoy Theatre and Royal English Opera House (now the Palace Theatre) in London, and a hotelier. He bought the island in about 1890 and gave it his middle name and surname.

== History ==
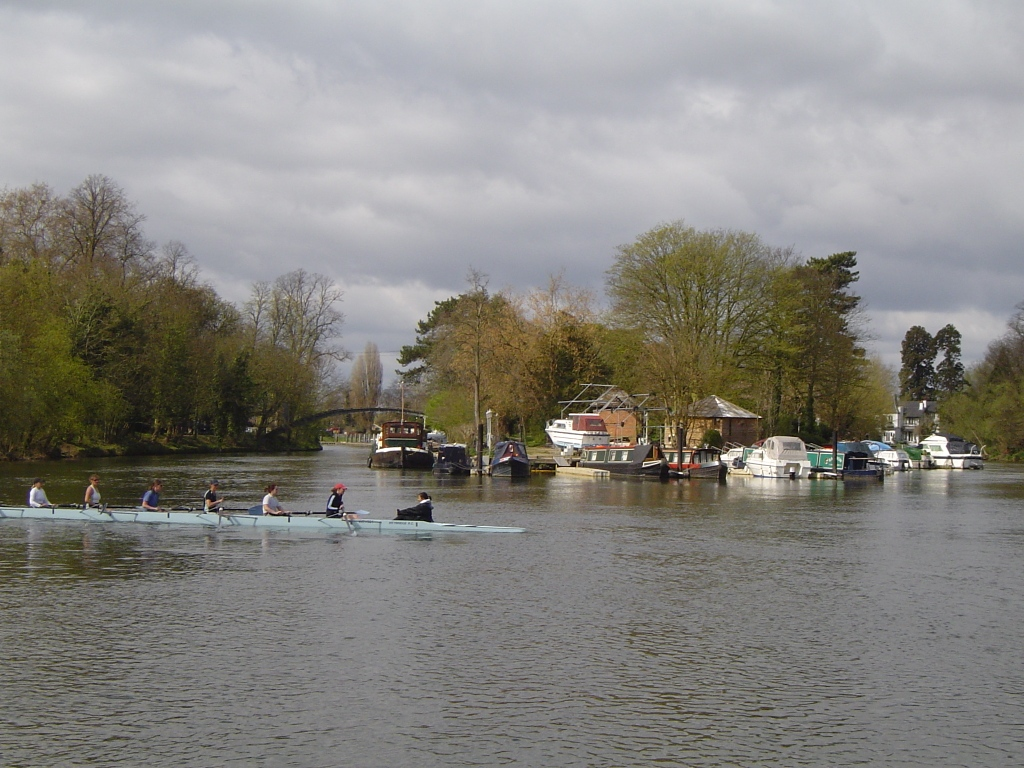
Residential narrowboats in front of the sland, looking west from Desborough Island

Carte intended to use the island as a special secluded annexe, accessible by boat, to his new Savoy Hotel, but a panel of local magistrates refused to grant him an alcoholic drinks licence for the property. Instead, Carte had a 13-bedroom mansion, Eyot House, built on the island; it was completed in 1898, and it became one of his main residences. Among the famous guests who stayed at the house were the dramatist W. S. Gilbert and the composer Arthur Sullivan. In later years, Carte displayed his macabre sense of humour by keeping a crocodile on the island.

Carte died in 1901, and his widow Helen (1852–1913) sold the island early in the 20th century. In the 1920s it was owned by Sir George May. In the 1940s it operated as a hotel. In 1958 it was converted to flats for rent and later converted back into a private house. It was later owned by Chinese businessman Chunlei Mi, the husband of Chinese TV presenter Dong Qing. House Beautiful reported that by 2019, the abandoned house had "lost the grandeur of its Victorian glory days". The mansion and island were sold in August 2021 for just over £3m. The purchaser, Andy Hill, is restoring the property and intends to hold events there including the production of Gilbert and Sullivan operas. The first public concert was held on the island in June 2023.

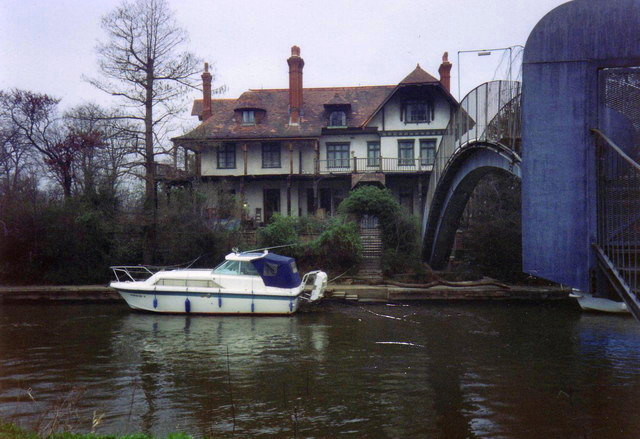
Eyot House and footbridge

== Features ==
Eyot House has a large garden, which Carte and his wife helped to design, surrounded by trees. The house has 13 bedrooms, five bathrooms, four reception rooms, a ballroom and 1.9 acres (0.8 ha) of grounds. It incorporates fairytale elements on the facade, including gargoyle and crocodile carvings in the eaves. The property includes nearby land on the mainland with parking for more than 20 cars.

A single-span footbridge built in 1964 provides access to the house. Previously, the island was reached by pulling oneself across the river on a chain ferry. The bridge consists of the high arch of a single steel box girder, with treads, brutalist railings and gates. The island has moorings for small boats.

== See also ==
- Islands in the River Thames

Next island upstream	River Thames	Next island downstream
Lock Island; Hamhaugh Island	D'Oyly Carte Island	Desborough Island
