= Bridge Eyot =

Island in the River Thames, England

Coordinates: 51.5263°N 0.7015°W

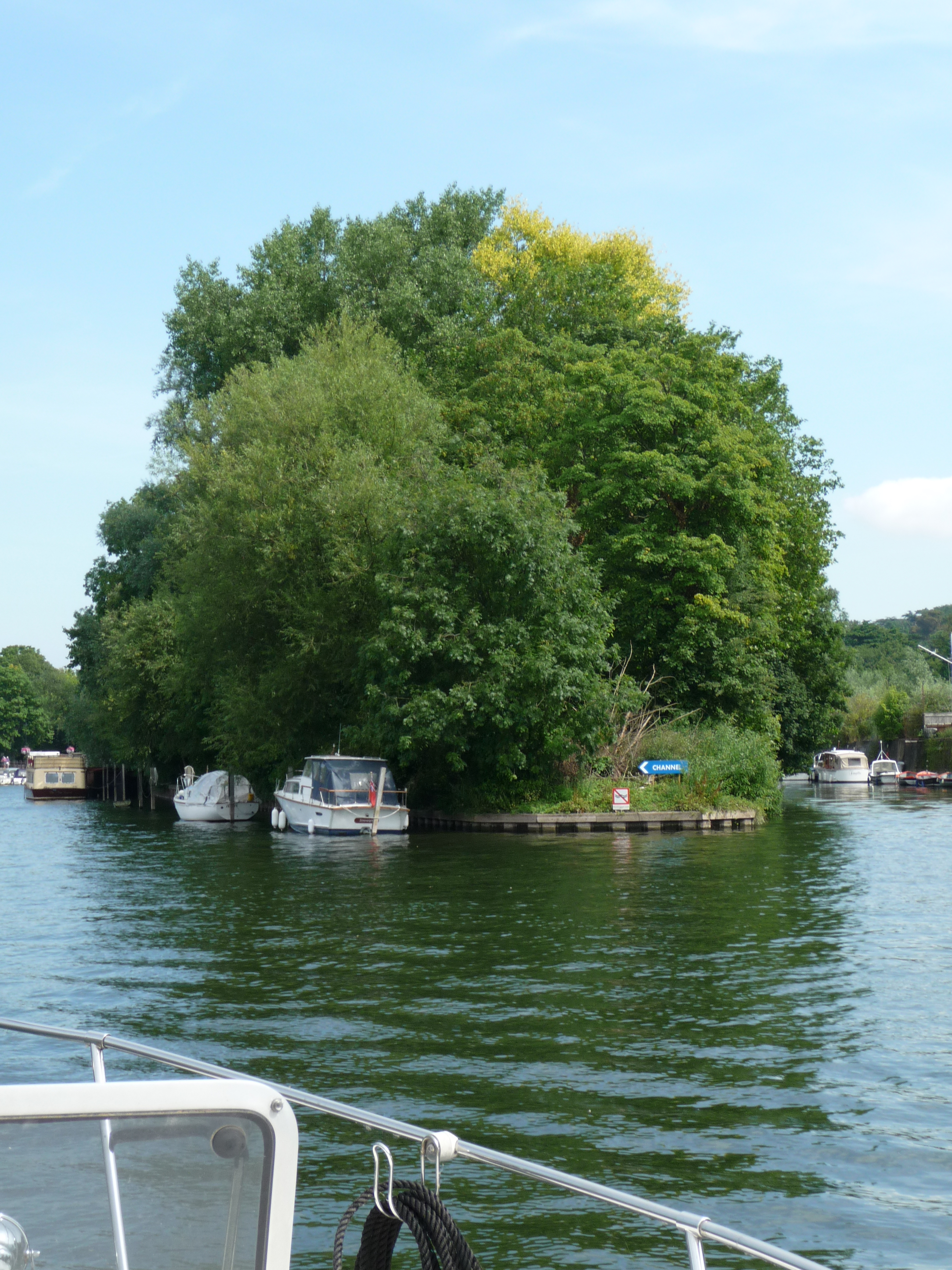
Bridge Eyot looking upstream

Bridge Eyot also known as Bridge Ait is an island in the River Thames in England just above Maidenhead Bridge on the reach above Bray Lock, near Maidenhead, Berkshire. The island is owned by the Royal Borough of Windsor and Maidenhead.

The island is tree-covered and there is also a very small island between it and Grass Eyot just upstream.

== See also ==
- Islands in the River Thames

Next island upstream	River Thames	Next island downstream
Grass Eyot	Bridge Eyot	Guards Club Island
