= Appletree Eyot =

Island in the River Thames, England

Coordinates: 51.4677°N 1.0205°W

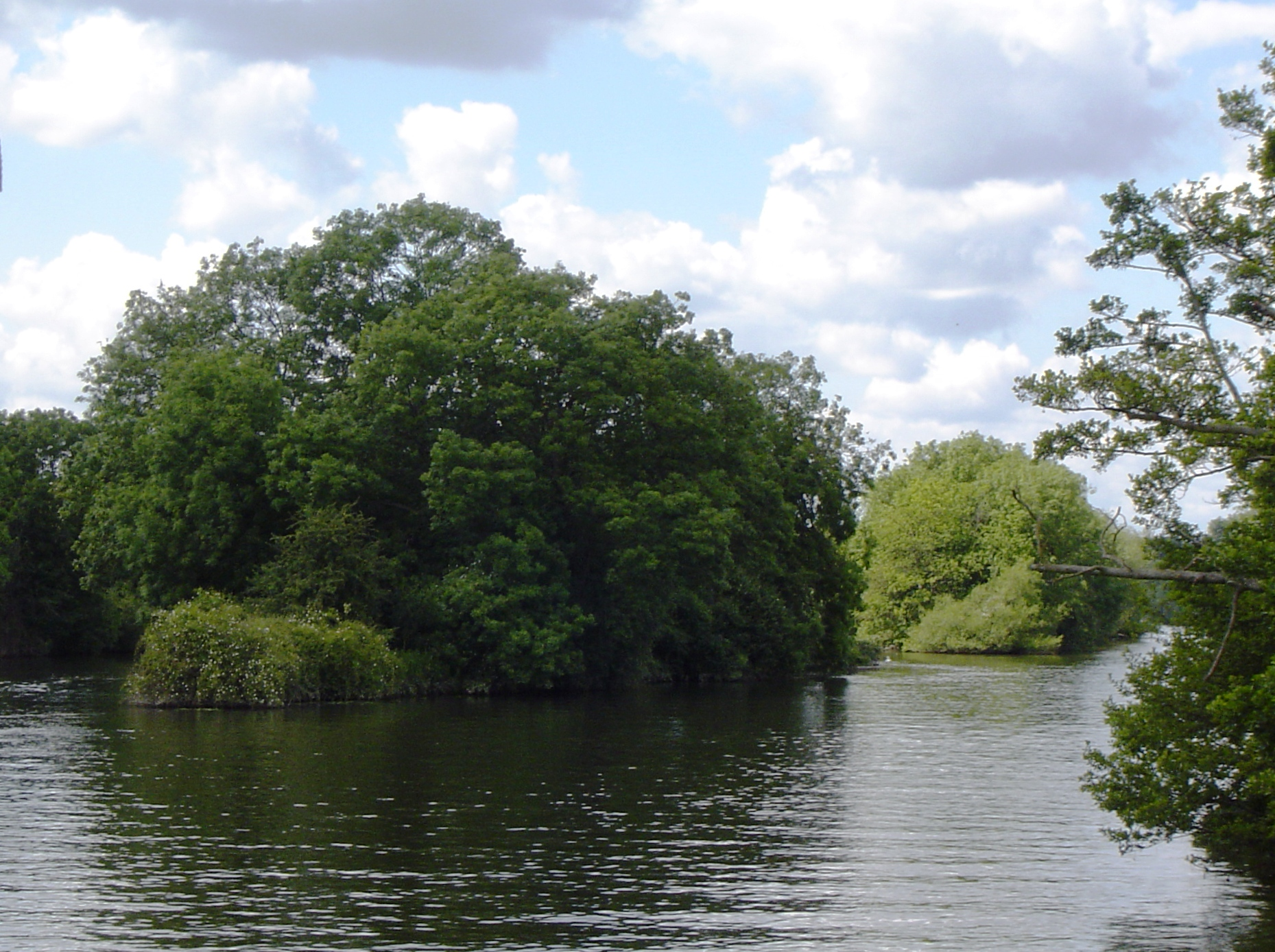
Appletree Eyot with Poplar Island behind it from downstream.

Appletree Eyot is an island in the River Thames in Oxfordshire, England.

The island is on the reach above Caversham Lock near Tilehurst, a suburb of Reading.Poplar Island is very close to it. The two islands are in the middle of the river, so that navigation goes to each side of them according to the rules of the river. Appletree Eyot is densely covered by trees.

== See also ==
- Islands in the River Thames

Next island upstream	River Thames	Next island downstream
Poplar Island	Appletree Eyot	St Mary's Island
