= Islands in the River Thames =

This article lists the islands in the River Thames, or at the mouth of a tributary (marked †), in England. It excludes human-made islands built as part of the building of forty-five two-gate locks which each accompany a weir, and islets subordinate to and forming part of the overall shape of another. The suffix -ey (pronounced today /iː/) is common across England and Scotland and cognate with ait and meaning island, a term – as ait or eyot – unusually well-preserved on the Thames. A small minority of list entries are referred to as Island, Ait or Eyot and are vestiges, separated by a depression in the land or high-water-level gully.

Most are natural; others were created by excavation of an additional or replacement navigation channel, such as to provide a shorter route, a cut. Many result from accumulation of gravel, silt, wildfowl dung and plant decay and root strengthening, particularly from willows and other large trees. Unlike other large rivers, all today are considered fixed. All in the reaches below Lechlade have been protected against erosion by various combinations of canalisation of the river, building up with dredged material from the river bed, water reeds, concrete, cement, wood or sheet piling.

== List of islands ==
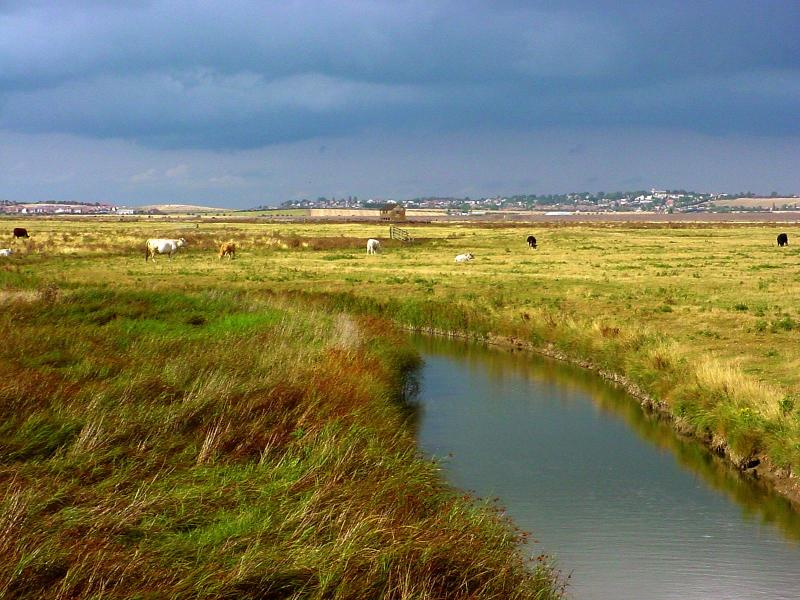
Sheppey - Minster from Elmley Marshes

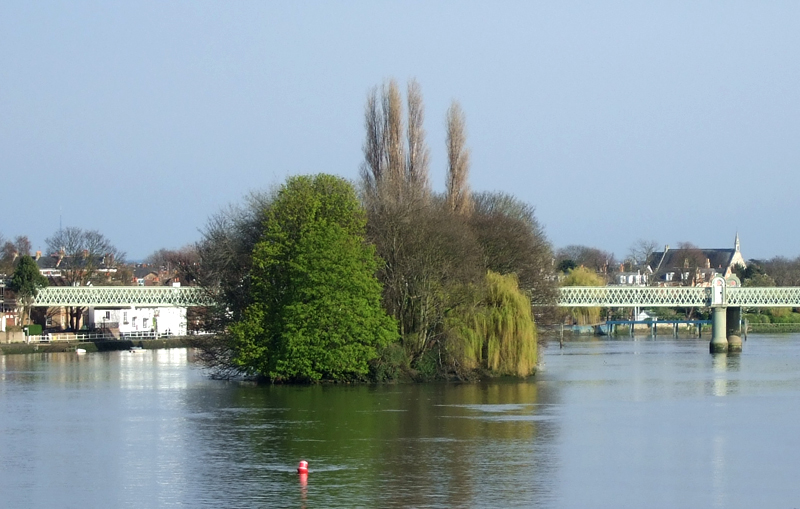
Oliver's Island looking downstream

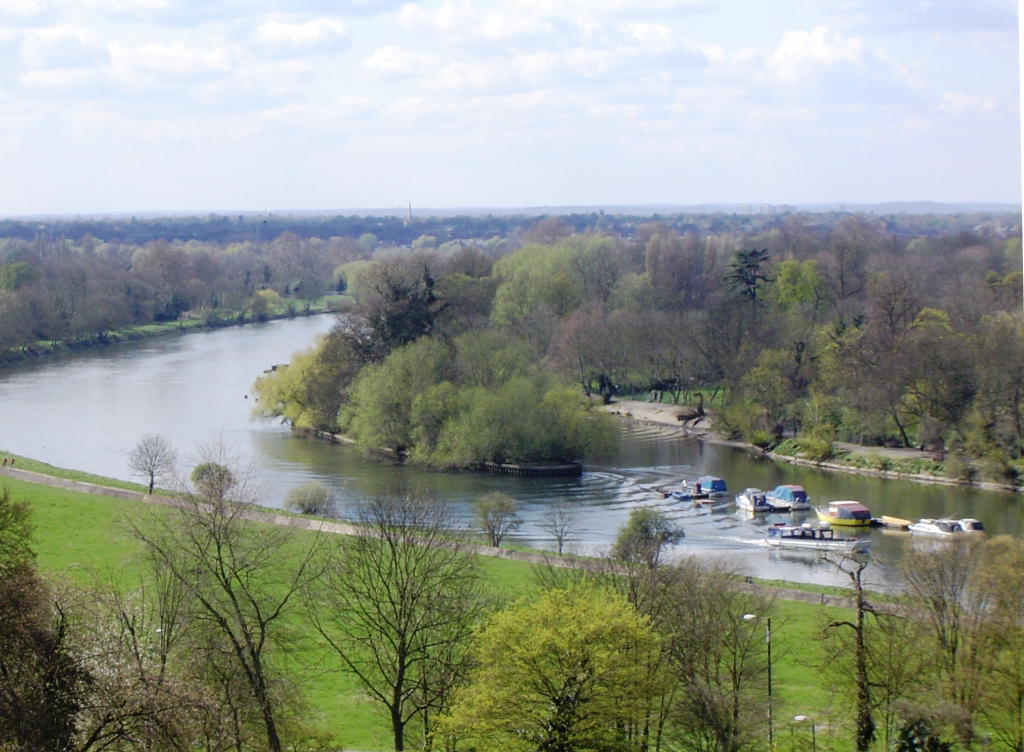
Glover's Island from Richmond Hill

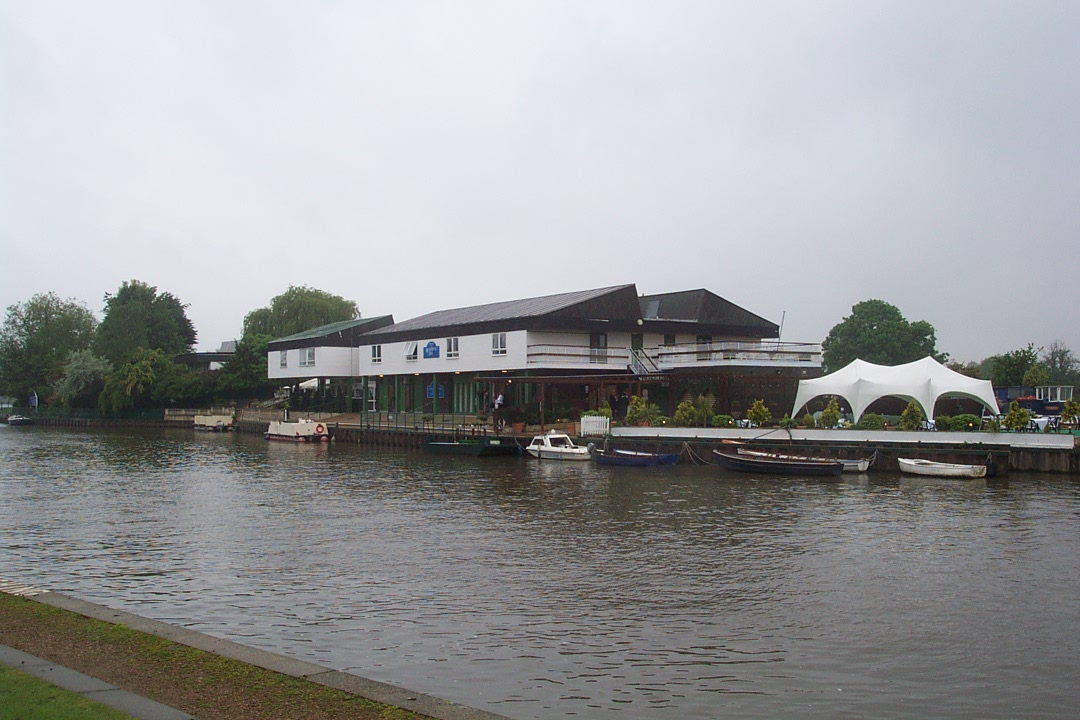
Raven's Ait from Queen's Promenade

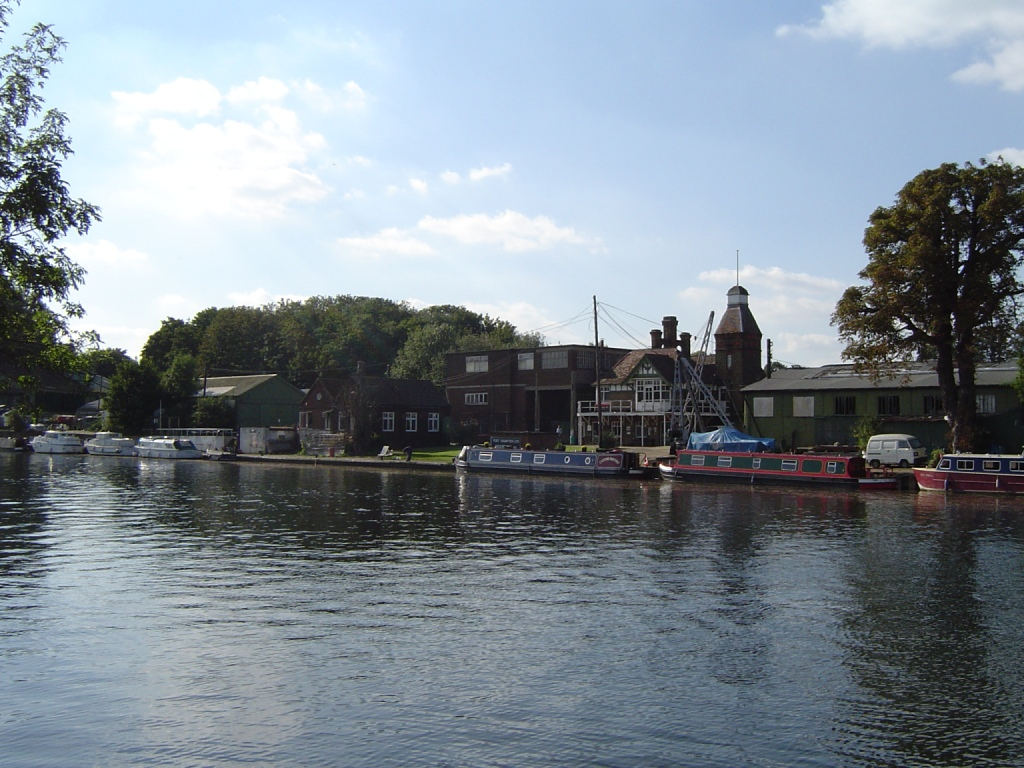
Platts Eyot - Port Hampton

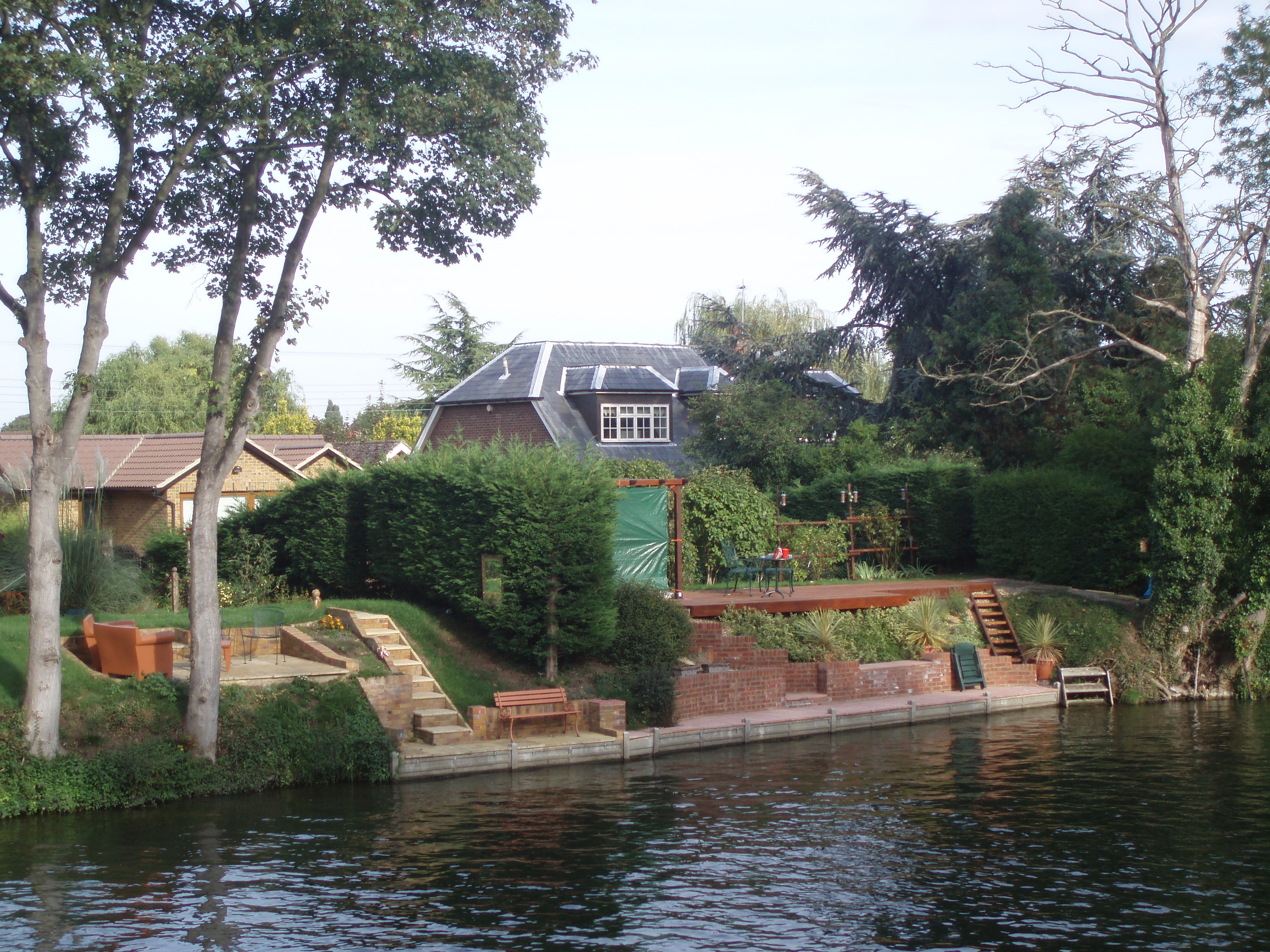
Ham Island - The Cut

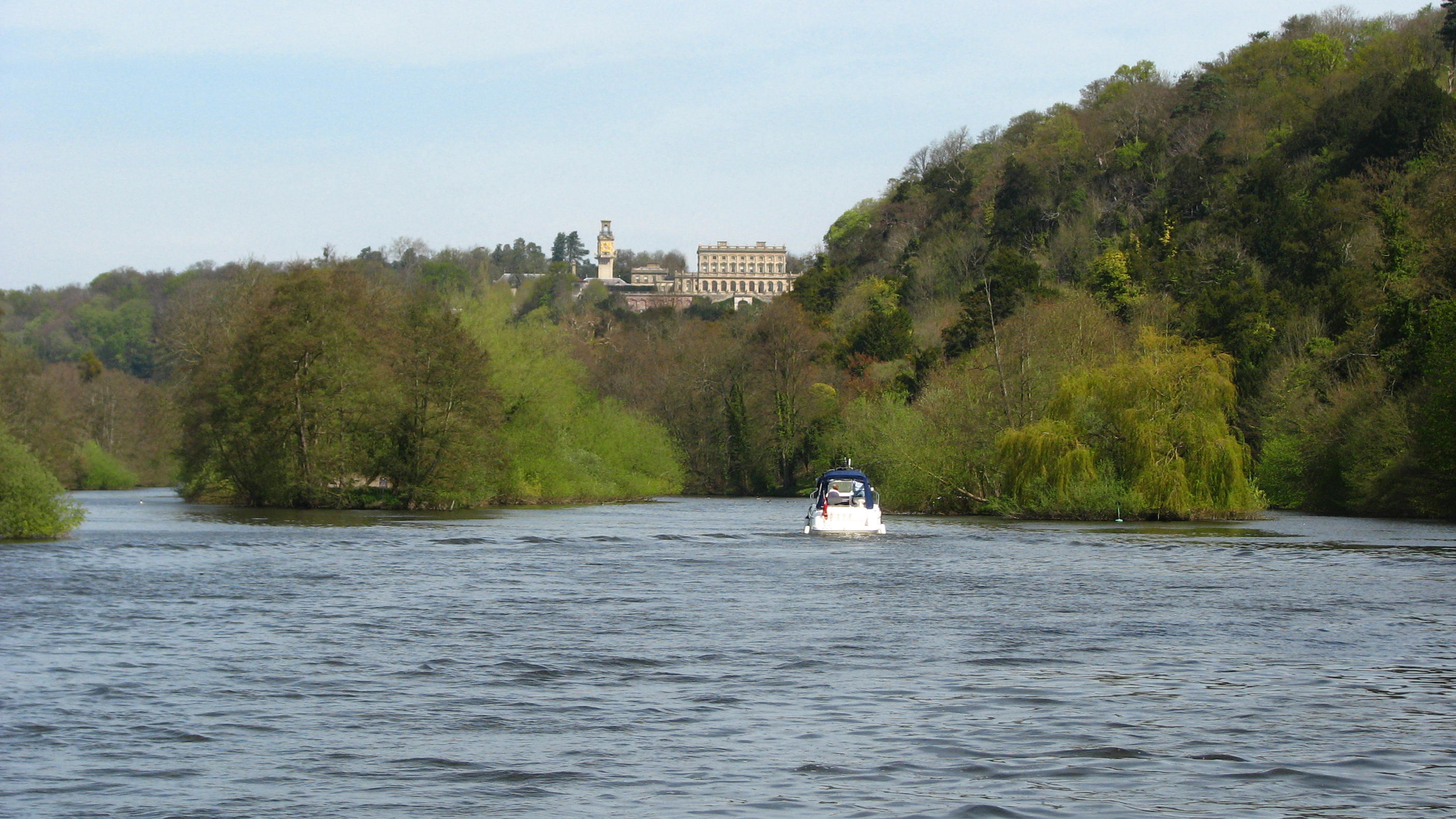
Bavin's Gulls and Cliveden

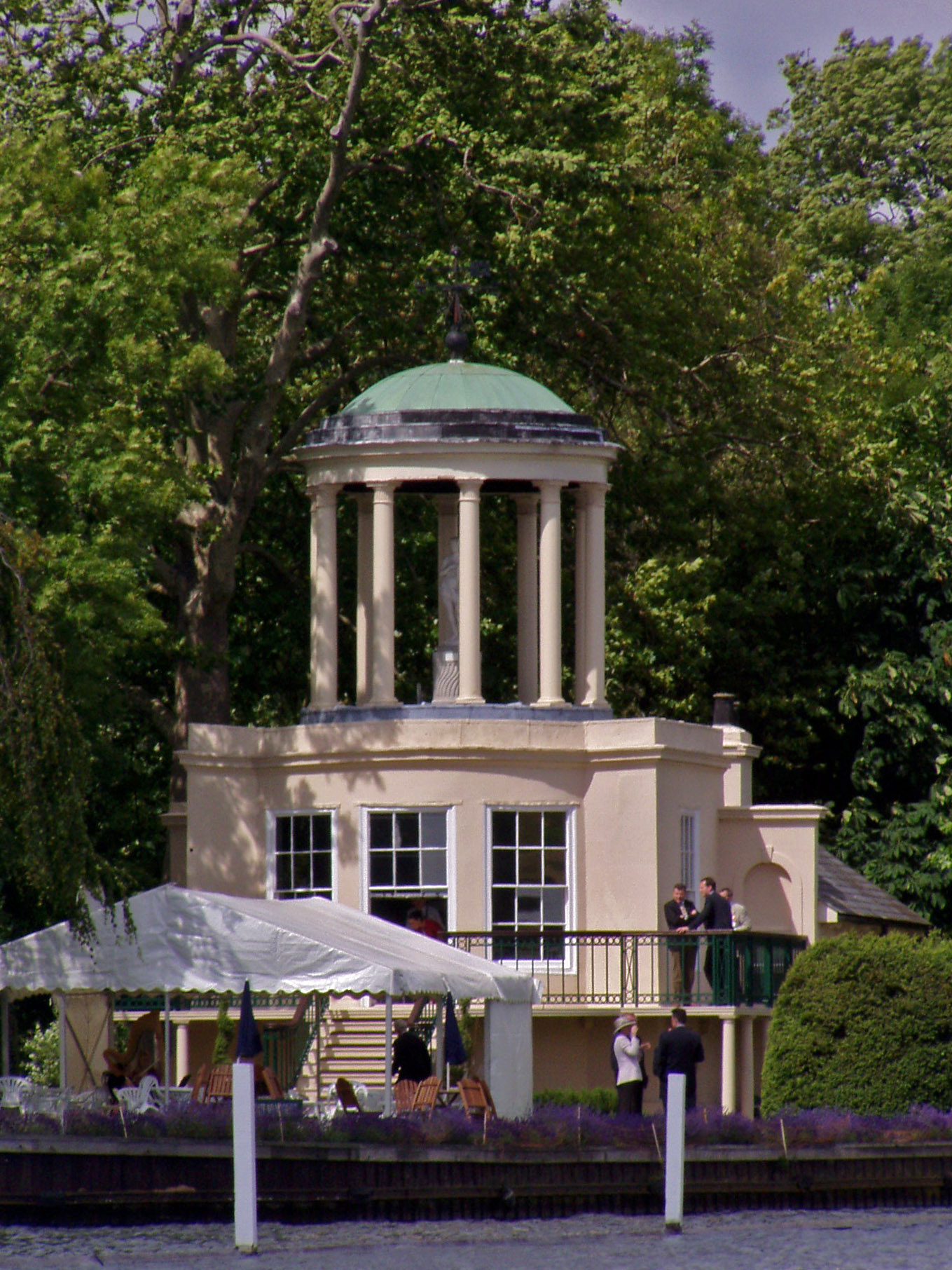
Temple Island, Henley

The islands are listed in order upstream from the sea.

Islands from the sea to Thames Head and published size:
Name	Area (acre)	Area (ha)	References
Isle of Sheppey†	23,040	9,320	
Two Tree Island† (also known as Leigh Marshes)	640	260	
Canvey Island†	4,556	1,844	
Lower Horse Island† on Holehaven† a sandbank of Holehaven Creek, Corringham	31.1	12.6	
Upper Horse Island	1.97	0.8	
Chiswick Eyot, Chiswick	3.266	1.322	
Oliver's Island, Strand-on-the-Green	0.90	0.36	
Brentford Ait, Brentford	4.572	1.850	
Lot's Ait, Brentford	1.724	0.698	
Isleworth Ait, Isleworth	9.370	3.792	
Corporation Island, Richmond	0.796	0.322	
Glover's Island, Twickenham	0.536	0.217	
Eel Pie Island, Twickenham	8.935	3.616	
Swan Island, Twickenham	0.250	0.101	
Trowlock Island, Teddington	3.700	1.497	
Steven's Eyot, Kingston upon Thames	0.372	0.151	
Raven's Ait, Surbiton	1.268	0.513	
Boyle Farm Island, Thames Ditton	0.407	0.165	
Thames Ditton Island, Thames Ditton	4.287	1.735	
Ash Island, East Molesey	4.513	1.826	
Tagg's Island, Hampton	3.681	1.490	
Garrick's Ait, Hampton	0.798	0.323	
Benn's Island, Hampton	0.1	0.040	
Platts Eyot, Hampton	7.710	3.120	
Grand Junction Isle, Sunbury	0.452	0.183	
Sunbury Court Island, Sunbury	2.457	0.994	
Rivermead Island, Sunbury	6.672	2.700	
Sunbury Lock Ait, Walton on Thames	7.735	3.130	
Wheatley's Ait, Sunbury-on-Thames (also known as Wheatleys Eyot)	11.928	4.827	
Desborough Island, Walton-on-Thames	112.00	45.32	
D'Oyly Carte Island, Weybridge	1.427	0.577	
Lock Island, Shepperton	4.662	1.887	
Hamhaugh Island, Shepperton	9.897	4.005	
Pharaoh's Island, Shepperton	4.1	1.7	
Laleham Burway including Abbey Mead, Chertsey	396	160	
Penton Hook Island, Laleham	11.443	4.631	
Truss's Island, Thorpe	0.310	0.125	
Church Island, Staines-upon-Thames	2.069	0.837	
Hollyhock Island with Holm Island, Staines-upon-Thames	2.429	0.983	
The Island (formerly marsh), Hythe End	3.953	1.600	
Magna Carta Island, Runnymede	1.706	0.690	
Pats Croft Eyot, Runnymede	0.690	0.279	
The Island, Wraysbury	0.518	0.210	
Friary Island, Wraysbury	7.309	2.958	
Friday Island, Old Windsor	0.154	0.062	
Ham Island, Old Windsor	126.0	51.0	
Lion Island, Old Windsor	0.353	0.143	
Sumptermead Ait, Datchet	5.180	2.096	
Black Potts Ait, Windsor	1.81	0.73	
Romney Island, Windsor	6.304	2.551	
Cutlers Ait, Windsor	0.955	0.386	
Firework Ait, Windsor	0.022	0.0089	
Jacob's Island, Windsor	0.641	0.259	
Deadwater Ait, Windsor	0.550	0.223	
Baths Island, Eton Wick	3.42	1.38	
Bush Ait, Windsor	1.118	0.452	
Queen's Eyot, Dorney	4.209	1.703	
Monkey Island, Bray	5.276	2.135	
Pigeonhill Eyot, Bray	2.625	1.062	
Headpile Eyot, Bray	3.440	1.392	
Guards Club Island, Maidenhead (also known as Bucks Ait)	0.640	0.259	
Bridge Eyot, Maidenhead	2.262	0.915	
Grass Eyot, Maidenhead	1.258	0.509	
Ray Mill Island, Maidenhead	0.991	0.401	
Boulter's Island or Boulter's Lock Island, Maidenhead	3.474	1.406	
Glen Island, Maidenhead	4.104	1.661	
Bavin's Gulls, Maidenhead (also known as Sloe Grove Islands)	1.856	0.751	
Formosa including manmade Mill and Sashes Islands, Cookham	126.597	51.232	
Sheriff Island, Marlow	2.410	0.975	
Gibraltar Islands, Marlow	5.491	2.222	
Temple Mill Island, Hurley	3.815	1.544	
Frog Mill Ait, Hurley	4.213	1.705	
Black Boy Island, Hurley	5.344	2.163	
Magpie Island, Medmenham	3.1	1.3	
Hambleden Mill island	1.584	0.641	
Temple Island, Remenham	1.051	0.425	
Rod Eyot, Henley-on-Thames	2.159	0.874	
Ferry Eyot, Harpsden	1.482	0.600	
Poplar Eyot, Wargrave	0.958	0.388	
Handbuck Eyot, Wargrave	0.770	0.312	
Unnamed Eyot, Wargrave	2.378	0.962	
Shiplake railway bridge island	1.193	0.483	
Shiplake weir island	1.579	0.639	
Phillimore Island, Charvil	0.399	0.161	
The Lynch, Lower Shiplake	3.248	1.314	
Hallsmead Ait, Lower Shiplake	4.745	1.920	
Buck Ait, Sonning	0.596	0.241	
Long Ait, Sonning	2.623	1.061	
Sonning Eye, Sonning including Aberlash House island	9.222	3.732	
Sonning Hill island, Sonning	0.578	0.234	
Sonning Marsh, Caversham Lakes Island	0.561	0.227	
Heron Island, Reading	1.668	0.675	
View Island, Reading	3.5	1.4	
De Bohun Island, Reading	1.122	0.454	
Fry's Island, Reading (also known as De Montfort Island)	3.561	1.441	
Pipers Island, Reading	0.147	0.059	
St Mary's Island and the Lower Large, Reading	0.958	0.388	
Appletree Eyot, Tilehurst	0.730	0.295	
Poplar Island, Tilehurst	0.740	0.299	
Mapledurham Mill Island	1.322	0.535	
Whitchurch Mill Greater Island	1.945	0.787	
Lower Basildon marsh island	0.759	0.307	
Streatley Mill Greater Island	1.977	0.800	
Cleeve Mill lower island, Goring	1.945	0.787	
Cleeve Mill island, Goring	0.979	0.396	
Cleeve Mill upper island, Goring	1.416	0.573	
Cholsey Marsh island	1.2	0.49	
Crowmarsh Mill Island	3.160	1.279	
Little Wittenham Footbridge Island	2.316	0.937	
Clifton Cut Island	61.864	25.035	
Long Wittenham Backwater Island	9.477	3.835	
Culham Cut Island	70.638	28.586	
Sutton Pools Island, Sutton Courtney	6.056	2.451	
Nag's Head Island, Abingdon	1.876	0.759	
Andersey Island, Abingdon	273	110	
Tiger Island (opposite the Abbey Grounds), Abingdon	19.830	8.025	
Lock Wood Island, Nuneham Courtenay	1.930	0.781	
Fiddler's Elbow, Sandford-on-Thames	11.688	4.730	
Fidder's Elbow far northern section	6.425	2.600	
Swan Inn, Rose, Kennington or St Michael Isle, Kennington	1.197	0.484	
Folly Island, Folly Bridge, Oxford	0.65	0.26	
Osney Island, Oxford	108.34	43.84	
Fiddler's Island, Oxford	4.105	1.661	
Godstow Bridge Island	2.181	0.883	
King's Lock Island	2.558	1.035	
Pinkhill Lock Island	3	1.2	
Shifford Cut Island, Chimney Meadows, Chimney, Oxfordshire	110.832	44.852	
Radcot Bridge Lower Island, Radcot	3.648	1.476	
Radcot Bridge Upper Island, Radcot	5.746	2.325	
Swan Hotel Island, Radcot	0.885	0.358	
St Mary's Mead, Buscot	3.697	1.496	
St John's Bridge Island, Lechlade (borders Buscot)	1.208	0.489	
Northern meadow, Castle Eaton	27.875	11.281	
Cricklade north-east meadow	7.747	3.135	
Island between High and Oaklake bridges†, Ashton Keynes	51.72	20.93	
Manor stream island, Somerford Keynes and Kemble	86.195	34.882	

== List of former islands ==
- Frog Island†, Rainham
- Isle of Dogs, Poplar
- Isle of Grain, Kent
- Thorney (or Thorney Island)† covered a broad area surrounding Westminster Abbey
- Bermondsey†, land and grounds of Bermondsey Abbey, formed by an anabranch (corollary channel) naturally dredged by the mouth of the Neckinger; a vestige of the channel is St Saviour's Dock.
- Battersea Formerly bounded by the Heath Brook, Falcon Brook and Thames.

Beyond the alluvium/silts of the estuary, by the English Channel and North Sea

- Isle of Thanet†, Kent

== Oxford floodplain ==
In the Oxford area the river splits into several streams across the floodplain, which create numerous islands. On the right bank a large island is created by Seacourt Stream, Botley Stream and Bulstake Stream, and there are smaller islands, including the large mainly built-up island now known as Osney, created by streams between Bulstake Stream and the Thames, including Osney Ditch. The Oxford suburbs of Grandpont and New Hinksey are on an island created by Bulstake Stream, Hinksey Stream and Weirs Mill Stream. Iffley Meadows is an island west of Iffley Lock, between Weirs Mill Stream, Hinksey Stream and the Thames.

On the left bank Fiddler's Island followed downstream by the built-up island historically known as Osney lie between Castle Mill Stream and the Thames. Cripley Meadow is also on an island formed by Fiddler's Island Stream, Castle Mill Stream and Sheepwash Channel.

== Eton and Dorney ==
The status of Eton, Berkshire combined with Dorney is controversial. These are two mainly pre-1900-built small villages and their outlying localities: Eton Wick, Boveney and Dorney Reach. Much of these areas of land in the 19th century was marked by the Ordnance Survey "liable to floods" which led to pressure on authorities for flood protection, along with the more densely populated right bank.

They have been, since 2002, on a more protected man-made island formed by the Jubilee River, which is sometimes seen as an advanced flood relief channel rather than a channel of the Thames. As the Jubilee River is maintained with flow at all times, they may be coming to be accepted by publications as on an island of the Thames, reflecting their objective strict geographical status.

== Lock islands ==
The construction of almost all locks on the Thames involved one or more artificial lock islands separating the lock from the weirs. These may have been created by building an artificial island in the river or by digging an artificial canal to contain the lock and turning the land between that and the river into an island. In many cases the lock island contains the lock keeper's house and can be accessed across the lock gates. Such lock islands are only listed above if they have a specific name of their own: all Thames locks are listed in Locks on the River Thames.

== See also ==
- Crossings of the River Thames
- Tributaries of the River Thames
- Eyots and Aits, Miranda Vickers, The History Press, pp 144, 2012.
