= St Mary's Island, River Thames =

Island in the River Thames, England

Coordinates: 51.4696°N 1.0044°W

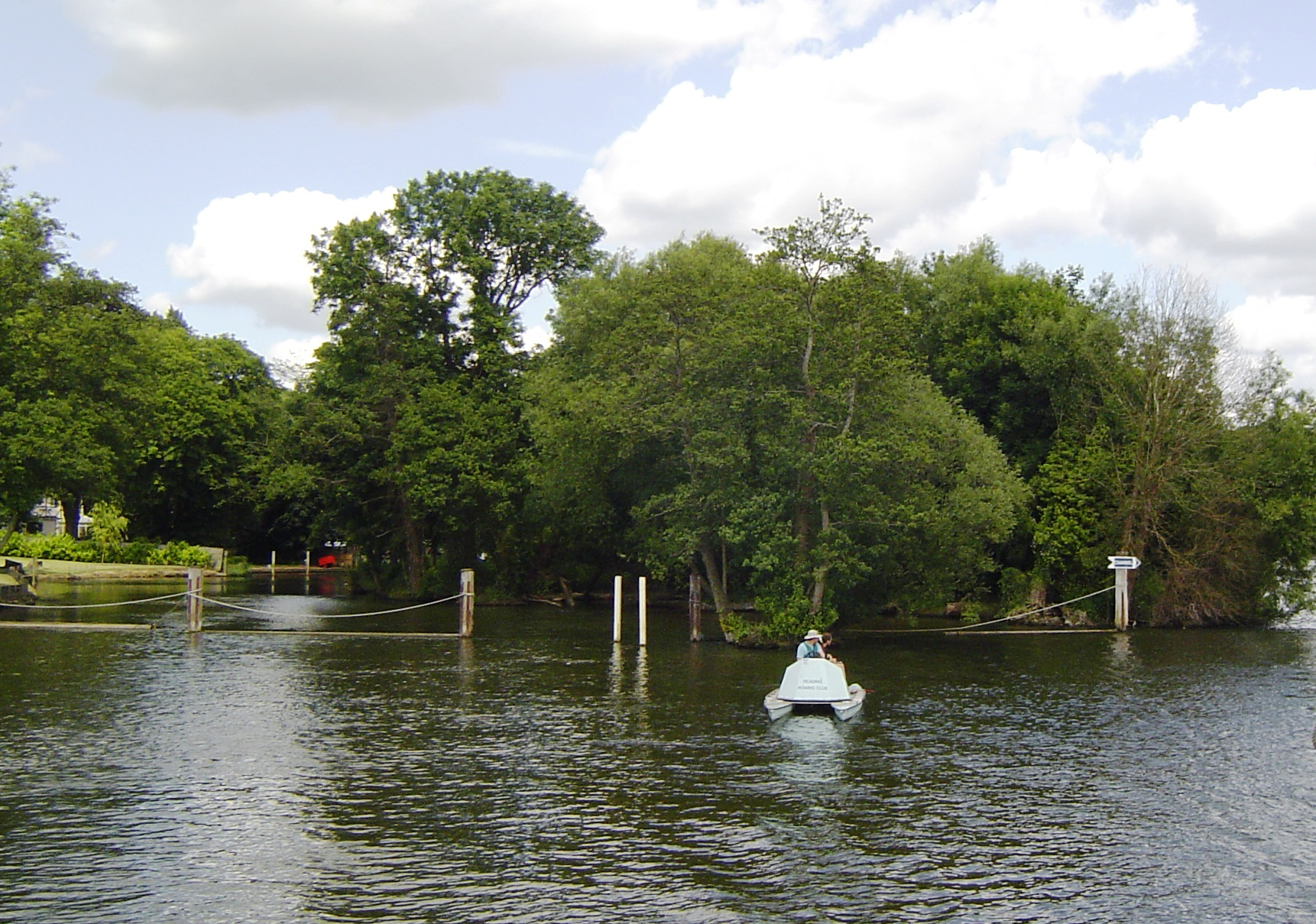
St Mary's Island from upstream.

St Mary's Island is an island in the River Thames on the western outskirts of the town of Reading, Berkshire, in England. It has a size of about 150 metres (490 ft) by 50 metres (160 ft).

The island is on the reach above Caversham Lock, close in to the northern (Caversham) bank in an area called The Fishery and is unpopulated.

== See also ==
- Islands in the River Thames

Next island upstream	River Thames	Next island downstream
Appletree Eyot	St Mary's Island	Pipers Island
