= Pharaoh's Island, River Thames =

Island in the River Thames in Surrey, England

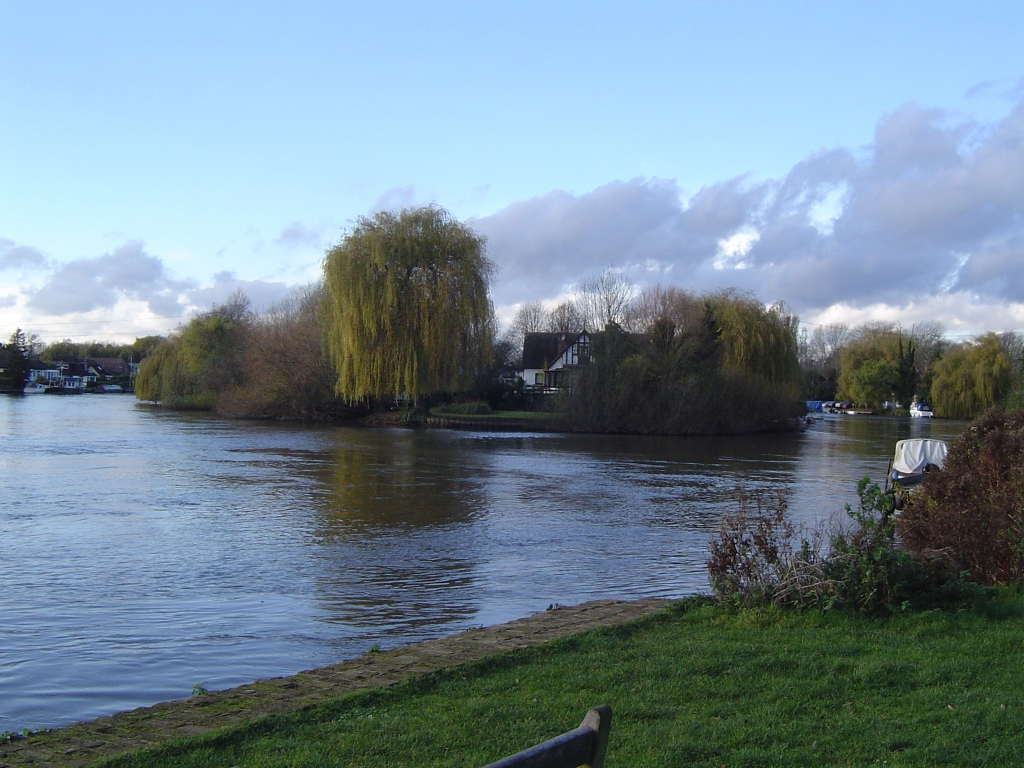
Pharaoh's Island from The Thames Court (taken when the river was red-boarded to navigation)

Pharaoh's Island is an island in the River Thames, in Surrey, England, 270 m (300 yd) upstream of Shepperton Lock.

== Overview ==
The island has a length of 280 m and a maximum width of 60 m. Shepperton Lock is 270 m downstream and two other channels leading to weirs diverge off after the island to its southeast. These channels then surround Lock Island and Hamhaugh Island. The island is only accessible by boat, with the facilities of Lock Island downstream and moorings there or by the pub The Thames Court almost opposite its eastern tip on the nearer, north bank.

=== River level ===
Above the lock, the variation in river level has been between 0.08 m at the lock gate and 0.99 m. This compares favourably with variation below the lock at between 2.67 m and 4.95 m in depth.

== History ==
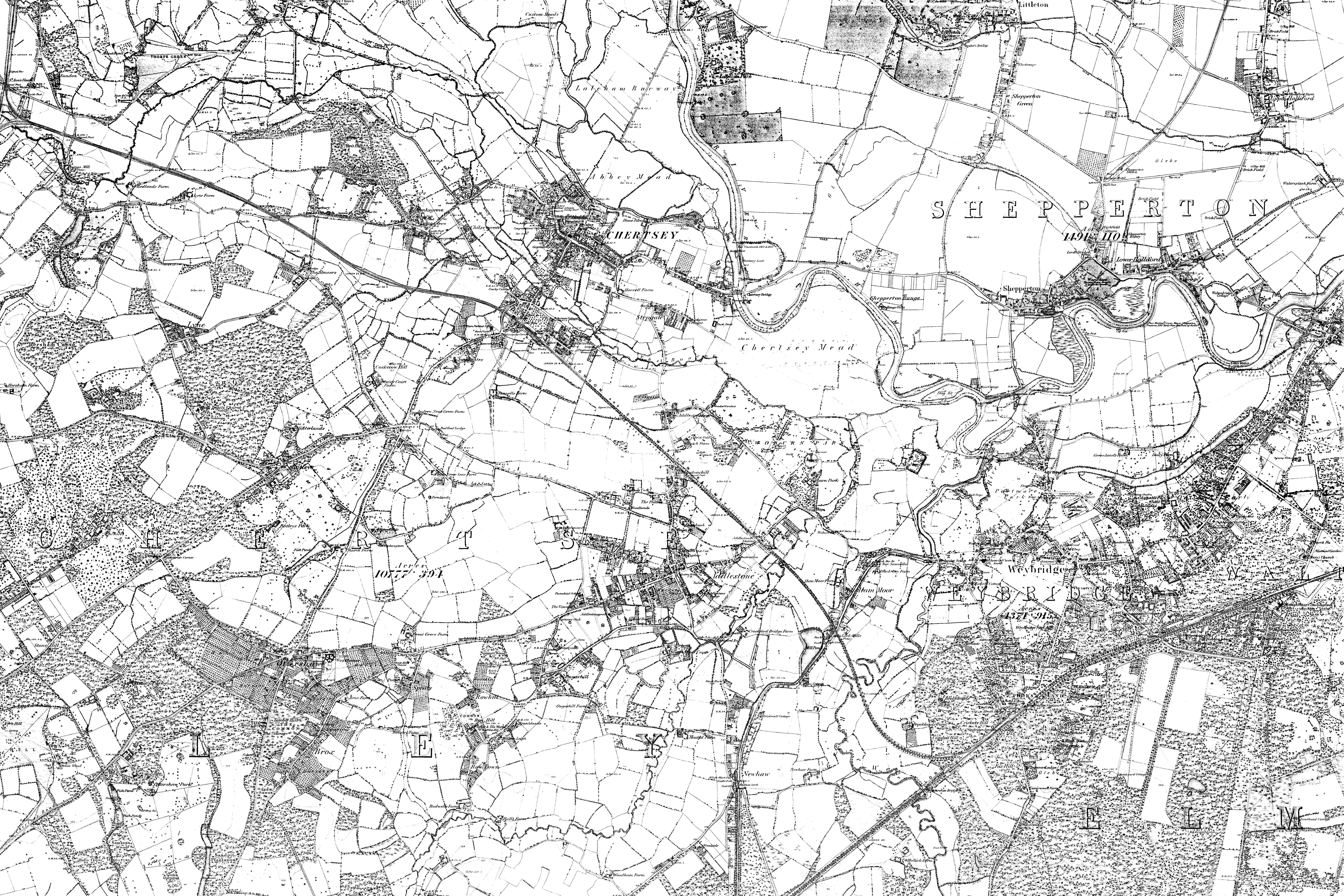
The whole island Dog Ait in about 1880. Click for broader map and to enable varied magnification.

It was purchased by the Treasury to give to Admiral Nelson after the Battle of the Nile (1798). He used it as a fishing retreat. The island was known as Dog Ait until at least the end of the 19th century. Tory MP and High Court Judge Sir Cyril Atkinson built the first house on the island in 1903 and named it Sphinx due to his interest in Egyptology.

=== Residential development ===
Since the late 20th century it has hosted 23 homes with individual moorings. Most of the properties have Egyptian names.

The property names are, clockwise, starting in the west:

- Kantara 51°22′55.5″N 0°28′00.2″W
- Memphis 51°22′56.1″N 0°27′58.9″W
- Nyanzh 51°22′56.4″N 0°27′58.5″W
- Thebes 51°22′56.6″N 0°27′57.5″W
- Nile 51°22′56.7″N 0°27′56.4″W
- Nakhti 51°22′56.8″N 0°27′55.4″W
- Isis 51°22′57.2″N 0°27′54.4″W
- Willow Hayne 51°22′57.4″N 0°27′53.9″W
- Nada 51°22′57.7″N 0°27′52.3″W
- Mannana 51°22′57.6″N 0°27′51.5″W
- Maleesh 51°22′57.6″N 0°27′50.9″W
- Philae 51°22′57.4″N 0°27′50.2″W
- Sphinx 51°22′57.2″N 0°27′49.6″W
  - (annex) 51°22′56.7″N 0°27′50.2″W
- Sunset Cottage 51°22′56.3″N 0°27′50.6″W
- Lotus 51°22′56.1″N 0°27′51.8″W
- Mabrouk 51°22′55.9″N 0°27′52.9″W
- Pyramid 51°22′55.8″N 0°27′53.7″W
- Osiris 51°22′56.0″N 0°27′54.5″W
- Amasis 51°22′55.9″N 0°27′56.0″W
- Ishta 51°22′55.8″N 0°27′56.5″W
- Pharaos Cottage 51°22′55.7″N 0°27′57.2″W
- Luxor 51°22′55.7″N 0°27′58.1″W
- Minoru 51°22′55.5″N 0°27′58.7″W

As of May 2020, Sphinx has fetched the highest cost, £1.318 million. This took place in 2013.

=== Deaths in January 2011 ===
In January 2011, a small dinghy ferrying people from the island capsized with the loss of two lives. The fatalities were named as university academic Dr Rex Walford OBE, and record producer Keith Lowde.

== Media representations ==
As the home of his family, the island was the setting for director John Boorman's two semi-autobiographical films: Hope and Glory in 1987 and Queen and Country in 2014.

== Notable residents ==
Ian Hendry and his wife, actress Janet Munro.

== See also ==
- Islands in the River Thames

Next island upstream	River Thames	Next island downstream
Laleham Burway (including Abbey Mead)	Pharaoh's Island; Grid reference TQ068659	Lock Island; Hamhaugh Island
