= Pipers Island =

Coordinates: 51.4657°N 0.9765°W

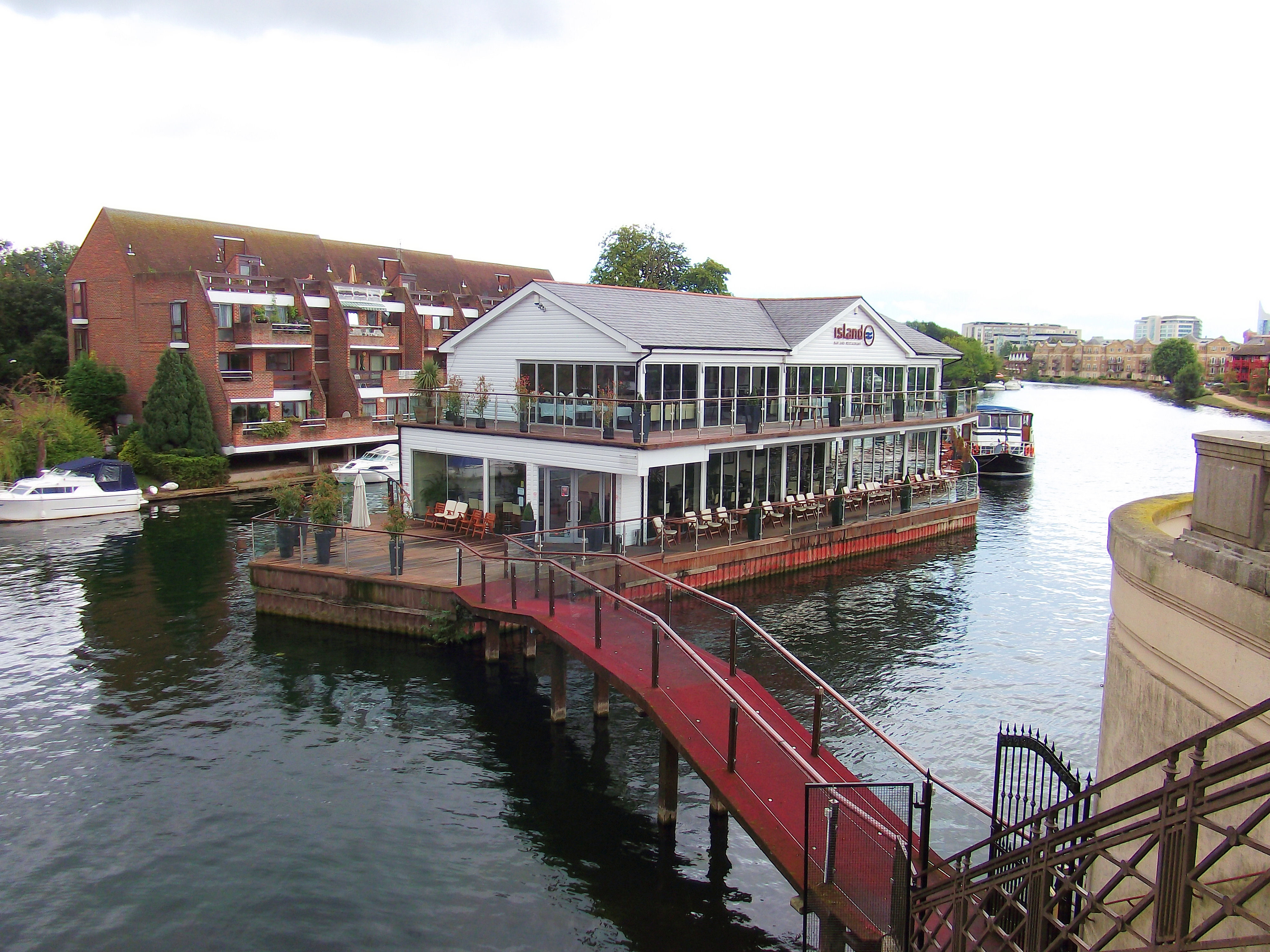
Pipers Island from Caversham Bridge

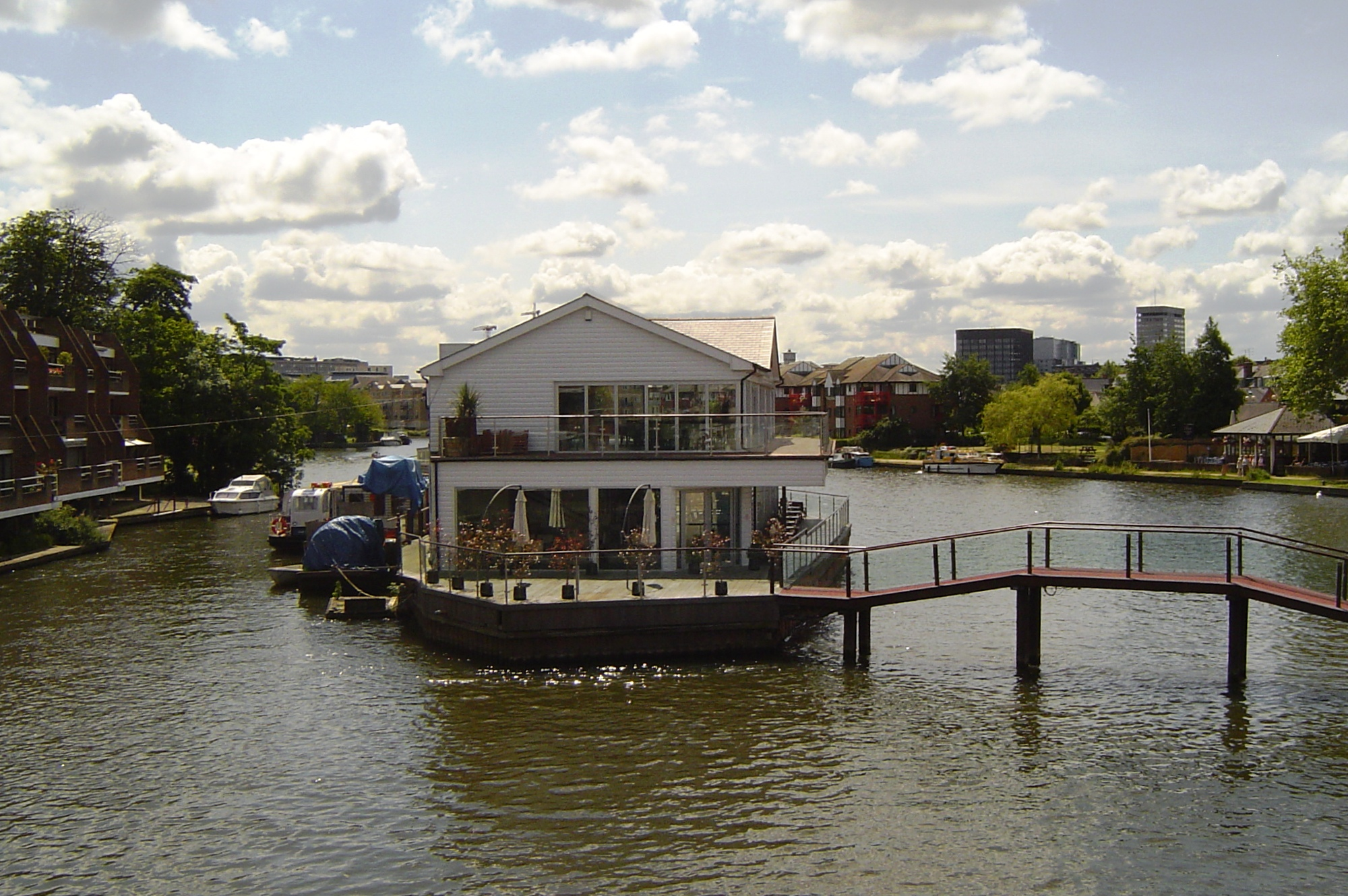
Pipers Island showing channel separating it from the Caversham bank of the river

Pipers Island, or Piper's Island, is the third smallest map-named island in the River Thames, in England. It is on the Reading, Berkshire reach the head of water above Caversham Lock. It is toward the edge of the central urban area of the town of Reading and connected by a gangway to Caversham Bridge, a road bridge that links that town to its left bank suburb of Caversham.

== Use ==
Pipers Island has been hard-landscaped into a public house and restaurant, The Island, the surrounding decking of which is shared for restaurant use and moorings of boats, used for a boat hire and larger vessels running hourly cruises during the Summer months. The banks of the island are today sheet metal topped with wooden decking. A protective rail guards the lower and somewhat smaller upper decks of the restaurant which are similar in design.

== Access ==
The ait, the third smallest of those named on official maps of the Thames, which has approximately retained its 100-year footprint measurement of 0.147 acres (0.059 ha), though the few rounded corners squared since, is accessed on foot by a footbridge and staircase that connects the island to the centre of Caversham Bridge.

== Location ==
The ait is toward the edge of the central urban area of the town of Reading and connected by a gangway attached to the middle of the downstream stone balustrade of Caversham Bridge, a road bridge that links that town to its left bank suburb of Caversham, its closer bank.

== See also ==
- Islands in the River Thames

Next island upstream	River Thames	Next island downstream
St Mary's Island	Pipers Island	Fry's Island
