= Fry's Island =

Island in the River Thames in Berkshire, England

Coordinates: 51.46365°N 0.97235°W

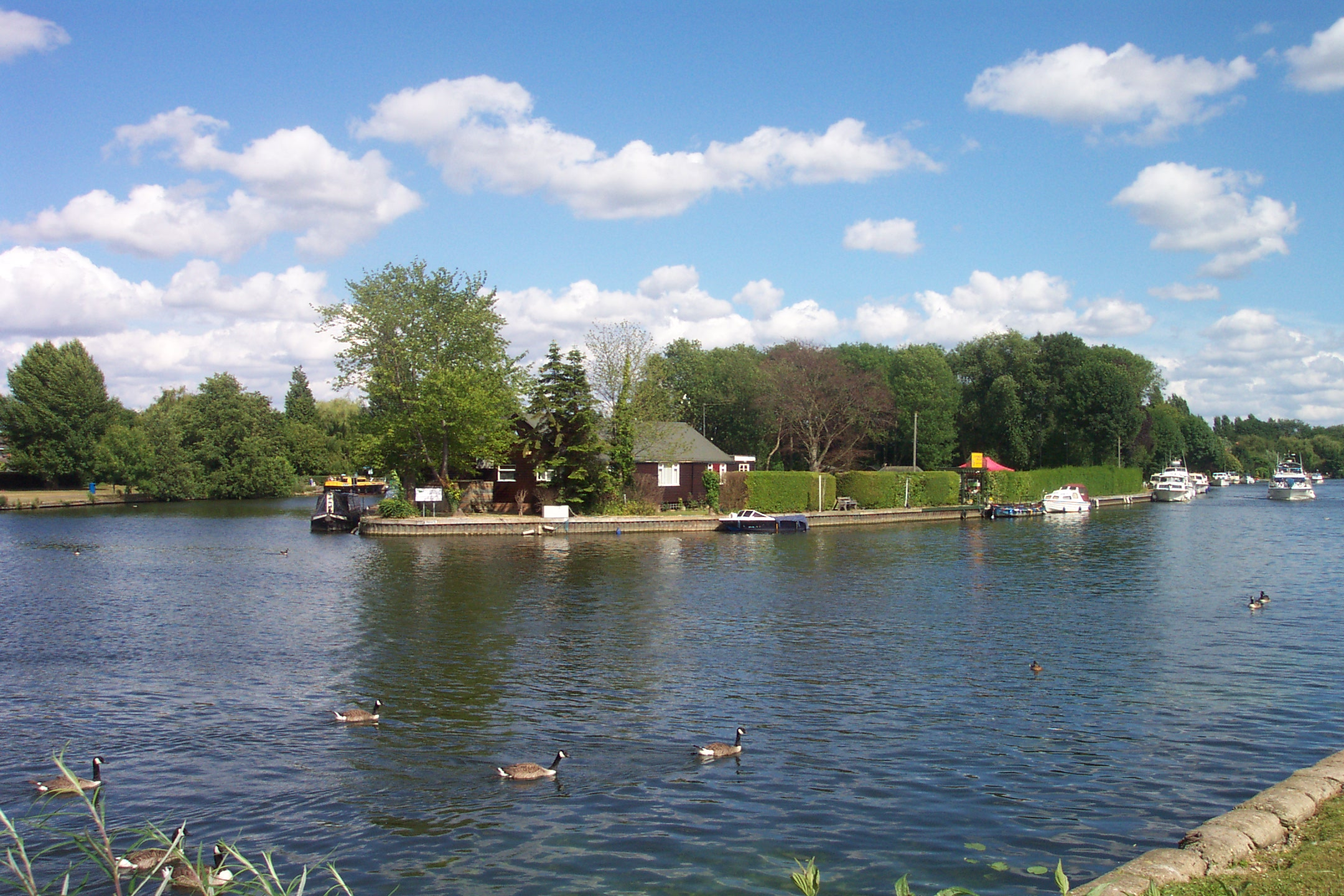
The upstream point of the island. The yellow sign indicates the ferry to the Island Bohemian Club.

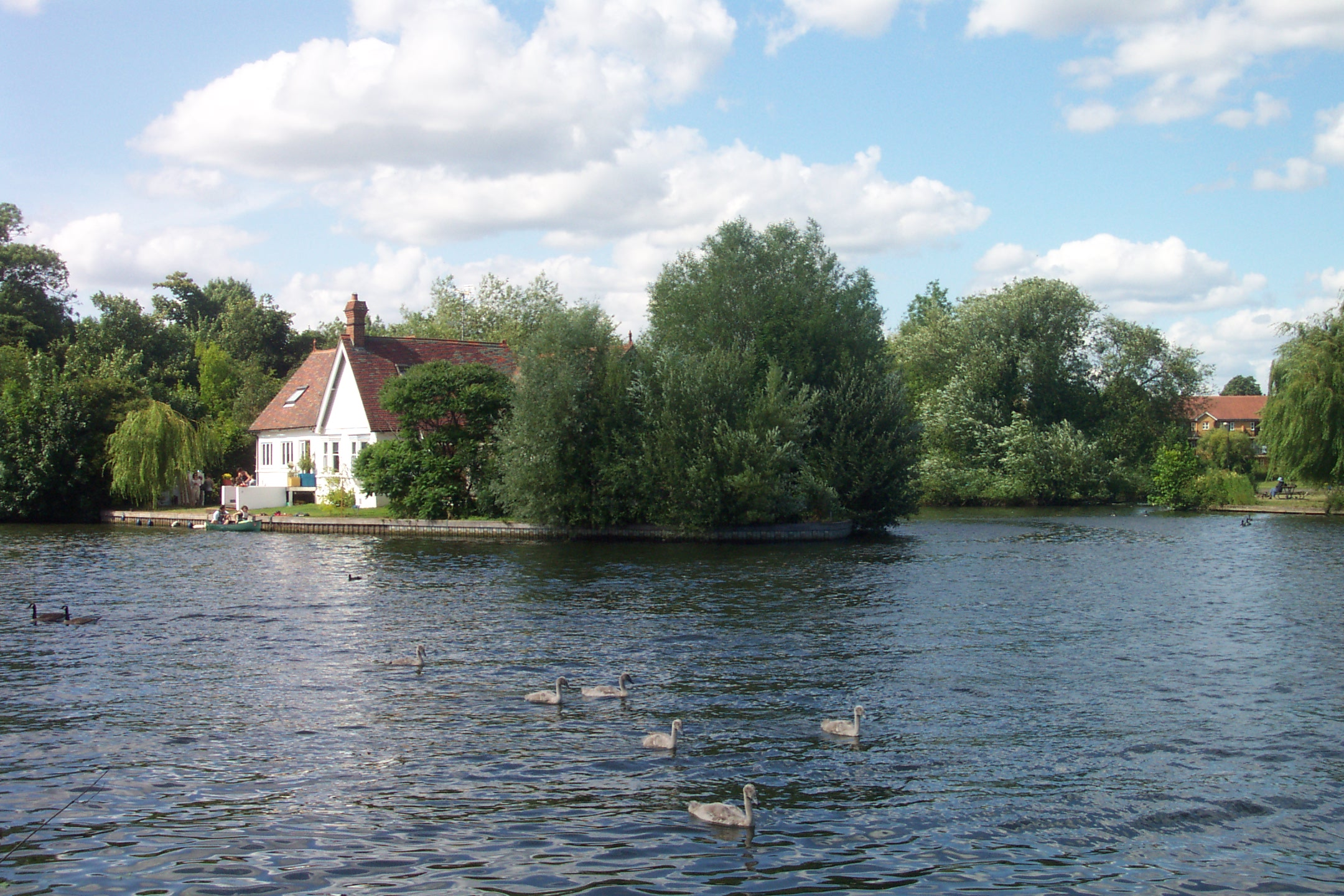
The downstream point of the island, with De Montfort House

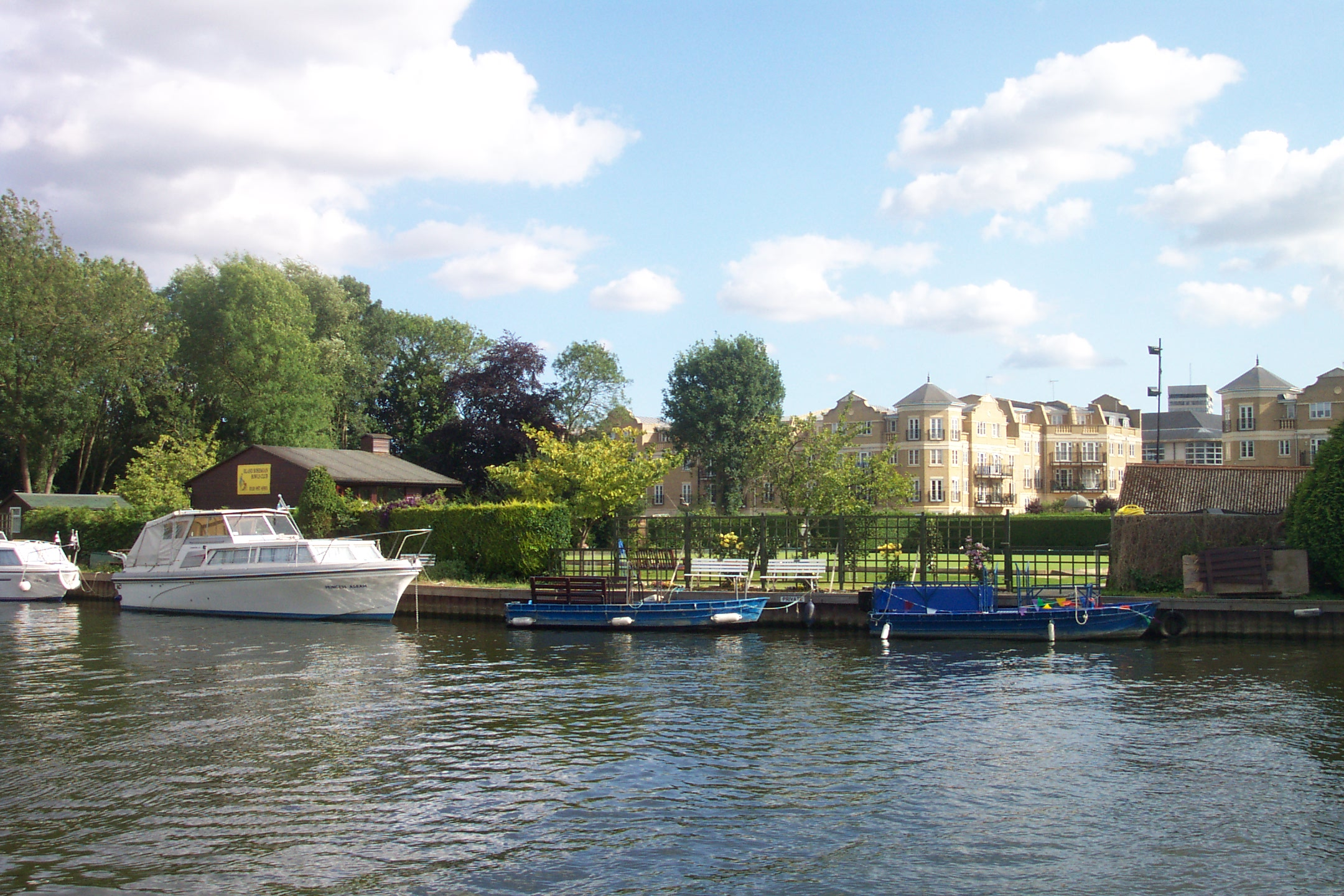
The bowling green

Fry's Island, also known as De Montfort Island, is an island in the River Thames in England. The island is on the reach above Caversham Lock at Reading, Berkshire. The centre of Reading is to the south and the suburb of Caversham to the immediate north.

Fry's Island is a natural island, the only access to it being by boat. It is home to a private house (De Montfort House), a boatyard with a residence (Caversham Boat Services) and a private bowling club (the Island Bohemian Club). Each of these occupants runs their own private ferry service. Administratively, the island forms part of Reading's Thames Ward.

== History ==
Fry's Island is famous as the location of a trial by combat between Robert de Montfort and Henry of Essex, the standard bearer to King Henry II. The contest took place while the royal court was in residence at Reading Abbey in 1163. Robert had accused Henry of Essex of cowardice and treason, because he had dropped the royal standard and called out that the King was dead during a battle with the Welsh. Henry of Essex denied these charges.

King Henry decreed that this dispute must be resolved in a trial by combat, to be undertaken on what is now Fry's Island. At the height of the combat, Henry of Essex fell wounded, and believing he was dead the King ordered the monks of the abbey to carry his body away and bury it. However, Henry was still alive, and the monks nursed him back to health. Because he had lost the combat he was adjudged guilty as charged and stripped of his lands and honours; however, he was permitted to become a monk at the abbey, where he remained for the rest of his life.

The first reference to the Island Bohemian Club dates back to 1908, when it held an annual general meeting under the name of the Old Codgers Club. The present name was adopted in 1909, and purchased the freehold of its part of the island in two phases in 1961 and 1968.

Demontfort House was built in 1897. During World War II the house was used as an American Services 'club'. In the 1960s the house operated as the 'Blue Beat Island Club', the club was the subject of a police raid in 1965.

Caversham Boat Services was established in 1970. The residence and large workshop are housed in the former Reading Rowing Club building built in 1893. The adjacent boatyard of Bridge Boats was established in 1958 as a builder of wooden boats, becoming a boat hire business in the 1980s. The business was taken over and merged with Caversham Boat Services in 2009.

== See also ==
- Islands in the River Thames

Next island upstream	River Thames	Next island downstream
Pipers Island	Fry's Island	De Bohun Island
