= St Mary's, Staines =

- Parish church of St Mary, Staines
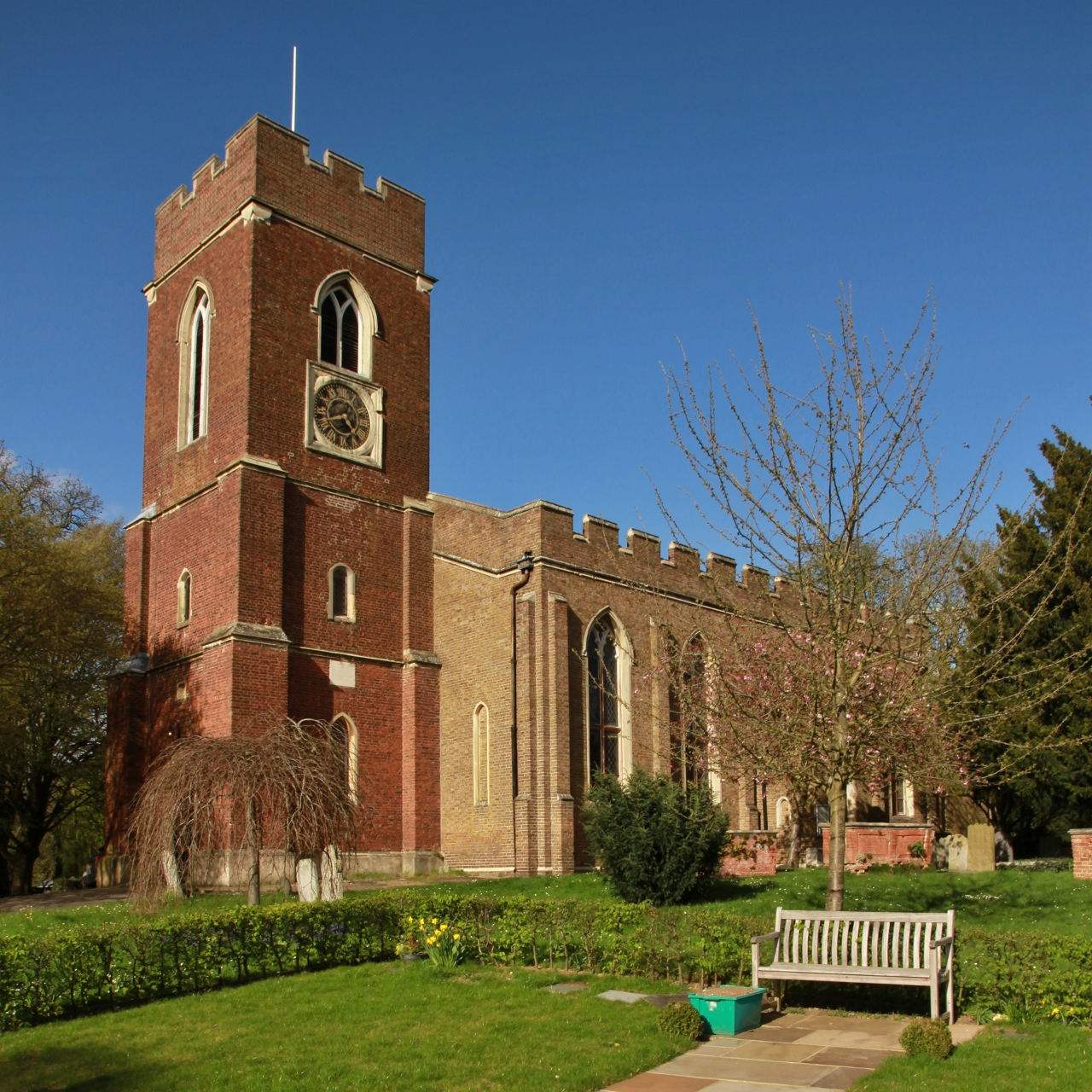

- 51°26′11″N 0°31′08″W
- Country: England
- Denomination: Church of England
- Website: St. Mary

History
- Dedication: St Mary

Architecture
- Architect: John Burges Watson
- Style: Gothic Revival
- Completed: 1828

Administration
- Diocese: London
- Archdeaconry: Middlesex
- Parish: Staines

Clergy
- Vicar: Rev. Jonathan Aptin Samadi

St Mary's, Staines, is a Church of England parish church in the town and parish of Staines-upon-Thames, in the Spelthorne borough of Surrey and the Greater London Urban Area. The parish is in the Archdeaconry of Middlesex in the Diocese of London. The church building is on an unusual rise against the Thames at the west end of the town. It has been a Grade II* listed building since 11 August 1952.

== History ==
=== History of the building ===
The mound on which the church stands commands views over its wide spur of land between the discharge of the Colne and the Thames. This suggests that the first church was built on the site of an older, pre-Christian place of worship. Celtic remains have been found at Church Island 200 metres (660 ft) south of the church, which before the navigability of the Thames was accessible in times of low flow by a ford.

There is a misconception that the first church on this site was built in AD 685. The earliest written evidence of a church building is dated 1179, but it may have existed by 1100.

Staines Parish Church, Burial Ground and Rates Act 1827
- Act of Parliament
- Parliament of the United Kingdom
- Long title: An Act for taking down and rebuilding the Parish Church of Staines in the County of Middlesex; for providing an additional Burial Ground; and for equalizing the Church Rates of the said Parish.
- Citation: 7 & 8 Geo. 4. c. cvii

Dates
- Royal assent: 21 June 1827

Text of statute as originally enacted

The oldest surviving part of the church is the tower, on which a plaque says it was designed by Inigo Jones and built in 1631. A large part of the body of the church collapsed in the 1820s, so a new chancel was begun after a local act of Parliament, the Staines Parish Church, Burial Ground and Rates Act 1827 (7 & 8 Geo. 4. c. cvii), was passed allowing the remains of the old church to be removed. The present battlemented nave was designed by John Burges Watson and building began the following year. In 1885 a semicircular apse with three windows was added to the chancel and the organ was moved to its current position. After the Second World War the stone pinnacles of the tower were removed as unsafe, possibly due to a bomb landing in Wraysbury Road during the war.

=== Fiscal history of the church until the commutation of the tithes ===
The rectory, consisting after 1217–18 solely of tithes, was appropriated in 1222 to the guest-house and infirmary of Westminster Abbey. In 1225 and until after 1291 it belonged to its "hosteler" alone. Its value, including its chapels of Ashford and Laleham, was £46 13s. 4d. in 1291 per annum. After the Dissolution of the Monasteries in the 16th century the rectory passed into lay hands, and from 1725 to 1844 belonged to the Coussmaker family of Westwood, Surrey. In 1842, when Staines parishioners commuted (ended the main financial liability for and converted) the tithes, the great tithes of Staines alone (excluding the lesser tithes and the two old, seceded parishes) were worth £365 (per annum) which was compensated to the Coussmakers. As in most vicarages, widely (across the parish) the chancel repair liability on the parish's landowners has been since, technically, apportioned.

== Items of interest ==
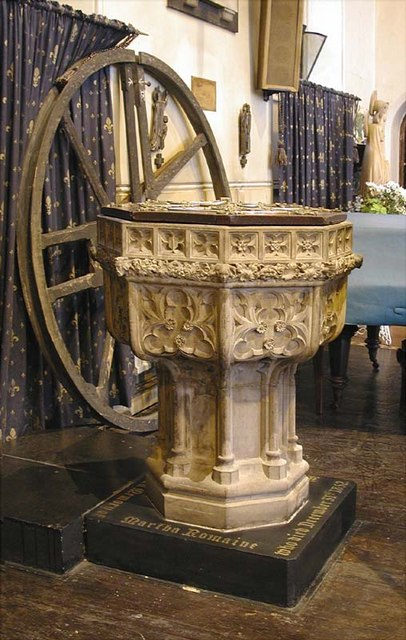
St Mary's baptismal font

=== Stained glass ===
The Trident Memorial Window commemorates the 1972 Staines air disaster, the worst air disaster in Britain prior to the Pan Am Flight 103 bombing over Lockerbie in Scotland. The then Bishop of Kensington, Michael Colclough, presided over a service blessing the window at its installation in 2004.

One of the 19th-century windows in the apse was given by the Crown Prince and Crown Princess of Prussia (the latter being the Princess Royal, Queen Victoria's eldest daughter). They gave it in memory of the governess to the Prussian royal children, Augusta Maria Byng, who once lived in Binbury Row.

=== Organ ===
The Brindley & Foster organ, thought to date from the early 1870s, was dismantled for restoration in 1973. After examining the mechanical action, the restorers, Bishop and Sons, determined that the organ was built before 1830. However, an account in a church magazine from the 1870s indicates that the organ was installed in the church in 1871. It is thus probable that Brindley & Foster took the instrument over from its original builder, enlarged and renovated it. The organ was removed in 1885 from its original location in the gallery at the back of the nave and re-installed on the ground behind the choir stalls.

=== Bells ===
St Mary's has a ring of eight bells, all cast by the Whitechapel Bell Foundry. Richard Phelps cast six of the bells in 1734. In 1829 Thomas II Mears cast the treble and second bells and recast the tenor. The five surviving Phelps bells are listed for preservation by the Council for the Care of Churches.

A 1999 survey revealed cracks in three of the bells, so in 2002 Whites of Appleton removed them from the tower, repaired the cracked bells and then sent them all to the Whitechapel Bell Foundry for re-tuning. Thereafter the bells were rehung with new wheels, headstocks and other fittings, and reconsecrated by Bishop Edward Holland at a service that same year.

=== Tombs ===
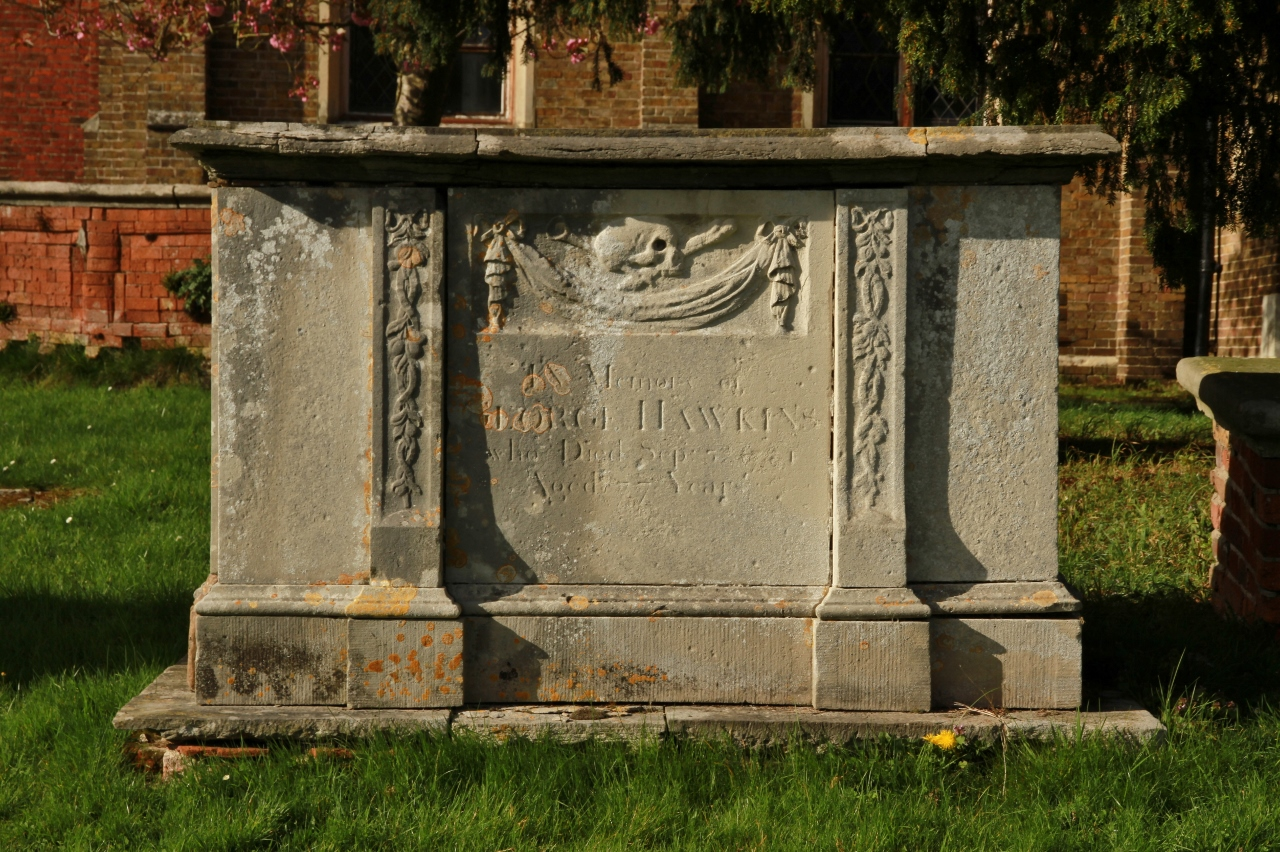
18th-century chest tomb of George and Elizabeth Hawkins

Notable people buried at St Mary's include:

- Augusta Maria Byng, governess to the future Kaiser Wilhelm II and the other children of the Crown Prince and Crown Princess of Prussia.
- François-Henri, duc d'Harcourt, representative of the exiled Louis XVIII to the United Kingdom and member of the Académie Française
- Letitia, Lady Lade, beauty, horsewoman, and mistress of highwayman Jack Rann and the Duke of York
- The chest tomb of George Hawkins (died 1761) and his wife Elizabeth is Grade II listed.
- George Gammon Adams, an English portrait sculptor and medallist, noted for his statue of General Charles Napier in Trafalgar Square.
