= Staines-upon-Thames =

Town in Surrey, England

Coordinates: 51.434°N 0.511°W

- Market town
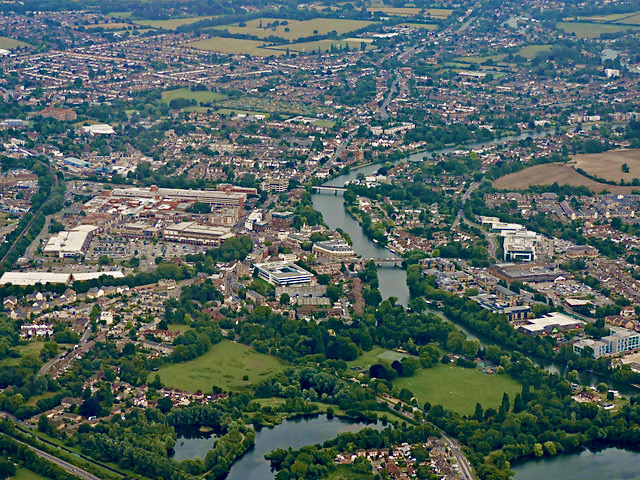
- Staines-upon-Thames (left) and Egham Hythe (right) viewed from the north west (Note: The photograph looks downstream along the River Thames in the direction of London. Staines Bridge is the bridge nearest the camera and the railway bridge on the Staines to Reading line is in the distance.)

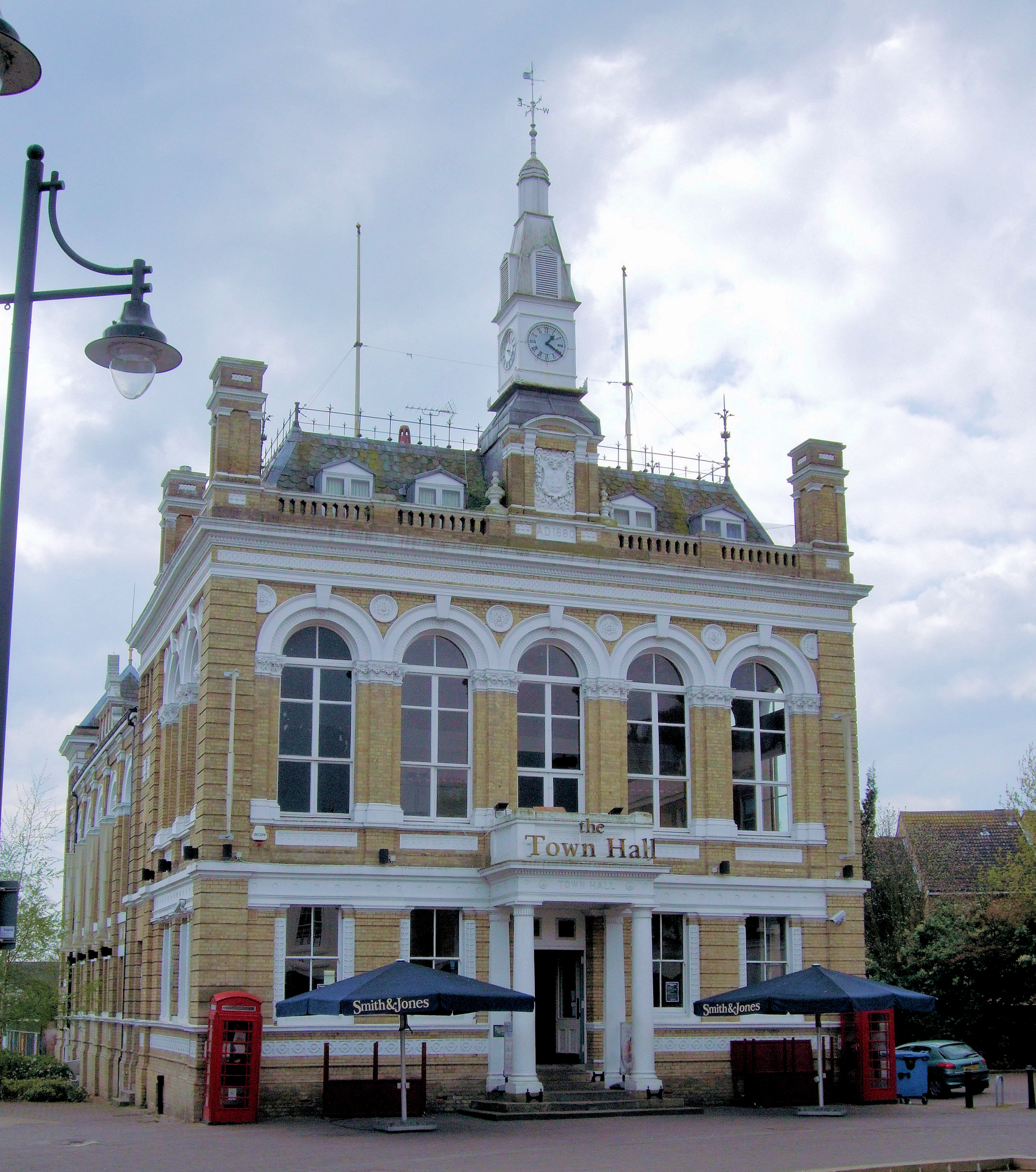
- Town Hall, Market Square

- Location within Surrey
- Area: 7.86 km^{2} (3.03 sq mi)
- Population: 18,484 (2011 Census, traditional boundaries) or 25,736 (Built-up Area, which includes Laleham)
  - Density: 2,352/km^{2} (6,090/sq mi)
- OS grid reference: TQ036716
  - London: 28 km (17 mi) ENE
- District: Spelthorne
- Shire county: Surrey
- Region: South East
- Country: England
- Sovereign state: United Kingdom
- Post town: Staines-Upon-Thames
- Postcode district: TW18-19
- Dialling code: 01784
- Police: Surrey
- Fire: Surrey
- Ambulance: South East Coast
- UK Parliament: Spelthorne

Staines-upon-Thames, commonly known simply as Staines, is a market town in northwest Surrey, England, around 17 miles (28 kilometres) west of central London. It is in the Borough of Spelthorne, at the confluence of the River Thames and Colne. Historically part of Middlesex, the town was transferred to Surrey in 1965. Staines is close to Heathrow Airport and is linked to the national motorway network by the M25 and M3. The town is part of the Greater London Built-up Area.

The earliest evidence of human activity in the area is from the Paleolithic and, during the Neolithic, there was a causewayed enclosure on Staines Moor. The first bridge across the Thames at Staines is thought to have been built by the Romans and there was a settlement in the area around the modern High Street by the end of the 1st century CE. Throughout the Middle Ages, Staines was primarily an agricultural settlement and was held by Westminster Abbey. The first surviving record of a market is from 1218, but one may have taken place near St Mary's Church in the Anglo-Saxon period.

The industrialisation of Staines began in the mid-17th century when Thomas Ashby established a brewery in the town. Improvements to the local transport network in the mid-19th century also stimulated an expansion of the local population. The current Staines Bridge, designed by George Rennie, was opened in 1832 by William IV and the first railway line through Staines opened in 1848. The town became a centre for linoleum manufacture in 1864, when Frederick Walton established a factory on the site of the 13th-century Hale Mill.

At the end of the 20th century, Staines became infamous as the home town of the fictional film and television character, Ali G. Although many local residents felt that the town's reputation was suffering through its association with the character, Sacha Baron Cohen, the creator of Ali G, praised Staines for being a "lovely, leafy, middle-class suburb... where swans swim under the beautiful bridge". Partly in response to the reaction to the character, Spelthorne Borough Council voted in 2011 to add the suffix "upon-Thames" to the official name of the town.

== Toponymy ==
The earliest document to refer to Staines is the Antonine Itinerary, thought to have been written in the early 3rd century AD, in which the location appears as Pontibus, meaning "at the bridges". (Note: In Britannia, first published in 1586, the Elizabethan antiquarian, William Camden, uses the name Pontes for the Roman settlement at Staines.) The first surviving records of Staines from the post-Roman period are from 1066, when the settlement appears in two separate charters as Stana and Stane. (Note: The name Stana is also used in 11th and 13th century copies of charters from the mid-9th century, although there is some doubt as to their authenticity.) In Domesday Book of 1086, the settlement is referred to as Stanes. It later appears as Stanis (1167), Stanys (1428), Steynys and Staynys (1535), before the modern spelling "Staines" is first used in 1578. The name derives from the Old English stān, meaning "stone", and may refer to a Roman milestone on the London to Silchester road that survived into the early Anglo-Saxon period.

In order to promote the town's "riverside image" and to distance it from its association with the fictional character, Ali G, Spelthorne Borough Council voted in December 2011 to change its name from "Staines" to "Staines-upon-Thames". The formal renaming ceremony, conducted by the Lord Lieutenant of Surrey, Dame Sarah Goad, took place on 20 May 2012. (Note: The proposal to change the name of the town originated with the Spelthorne Business Forum. In a November 2011 public consultation, 428 responses were in favour and 234 opposed, but there were objections from local organisations, including from Staines Town Football Club.) The Royal Mail adopted the new name in mid-2013.

== Geography ==
=== Location ===
Staines-upon-Thames is in northwest Surrey, around 17 1/4 miles (28 kilometres) from Charing Cross, central London. It is close to the borders of Berkshire and Greater London. The town is linked to junction 13 of the M25 by the A30 and to the M3 by the A308. The area surrounding the borough council offices and the magistrates' courts, to the southeast of the town centre, is known as Knowle Green. (Note: In the 16th century, Knowle Green was part of a 200-acre (81 ha) estate, owned by the Knowles family.) Egham Hythe, also in Surrey, is on the south side of the Thames and is linked to Staines by Staines Bridge.

Staines town centre is close to the confluence of the rivers Colne and Thames. A former millstream, known as Sweeps Ditch, ran to the east of the High Street, but much of its course was diverted underground in the 20th century. (Note: Sweeps Ditch is thought to have been dug in the post-medieval period, but it may follow a palaeochannel of the River Colne.) Severe flooding events have taken place in Staines in 1894, 1947, and 2014.

=== Topography and geology ===
Much of the town is built on gravel "islands" that rise above the low-lying floodplains of the Thames and Colne. These gravel deposits have a typical maximum elevation of 14 m (46 ft) above ordnance datum (AOD) and are as little as 0.5 m (1.6 ft) above the surrounding floodplain. Staines High Street, oriented northeast to southwest, runs across one of these islands to the site of the medieval bridge and was the nucleus of the Roman town. St Mary's Church, on "Binbury island" to the northwest of the centre, is thought to have been the focus of settlement activity in the late-Saxon period. Elevations below 13.5 m (44 ft) AOD were liable to flooding until the early 19th century and many areas of gravel are covered by muddy silts and sands. There are brickearth deposits to the east of the town, along the A30, and outcrops of alluvium to the north and south.

== History ==
=== Early history ===
The earliest evidence of human activity in Staines is from the Paleolithic. Flint blades, along with reindeer and horse bone fragments, have been found during excavations at Church Lammas, to the west of the town centre. (Note: Pits, thought to date from the Mesolithic, have been discovered close to the Church Lammas site.) During the Mesolithic, the area around Staines is thought to have been covered with a dense pine and birch forest. A Neolithic causewayed enclosure, about 800 metres (1/2 mile) west of St Mary's Church, was identified by aerial photography in 1959. The site, on a gravel island in the Colne river delta, 16 m (52 ft) AOD, consisted of two concentric, subcircular ditches, with a probable main entrance at the southeastern side. Pottery sherds and worked flints were found on the site, as well as fragments of human bone. Other Neolithic artefacts from the local area include fragments of a jadeite axe, discovered on Staines Moor in the early 1980s, tentatively dated to c. 3500 – c. 1700 BCE.

Deverel–Rimbury pottery from the Church Lammas lands indicates that the Staines area was settled in the Bronze Age and a roundhouse from the same period has been identified at Laleham. Two round barrow ring ditches, one of which had a cremation burial at the centre, were found at Knowle Green in 2021. A further ring ditch, around 21 m (69 ft) in diameter, was found during excavations of the Majestic House site, close to the eastern end of the High Street. A Bronze Age field system at Hengrove Farm was also cultivated during the Iron Age, but fell out of use around the start of the Roman period. There is also evidence of an early Iron Age enclosure on Staines Moor and finds from the site include pottery sherds, flints and animal bones, with evidence of burning having taken place there. Since Staines is located on the low-lying floodplain of the Thames, it is likely that historical flooding events have destroyed much of the archaeological evidence of pre-Roman human activity in the town centre.

=== Roman and Saxon ===
The Roman road from London to Silchester crossed the Thames in the Staines area. Both the Thames and Colne are thought to have had multiple channels during this period, which may have necessitated the building of more than one bridge. (Note: The exact position of the Roman bridge over the Thames at Staines is uncertain, but the later medieval bridge is generally assumed to have been built on the same site. The High Street is also thought to overlie the course of the Roman road as it approached the crossing. Until the late 20th century, it was thought that Staines was chosen as the location of the crossing, because the gravel islands in the area constrained the main river channel so that it could be bridged. However, more recent excavations have revealed that the width of the Thames in Roman times was around 230 m (250 yd), which may have been too wide for a bridge of that period. An alternative proposal is that the Roman bridge may have been further upstream, closer to Egham.) There was a settlement in the area surrounding the modern High Street and, although the date of its foundation is uncertain, the earliest archaeological evidence is from 54–96 AD, corresponding to the reign of Nero and the period of the Flavian Dynasty.

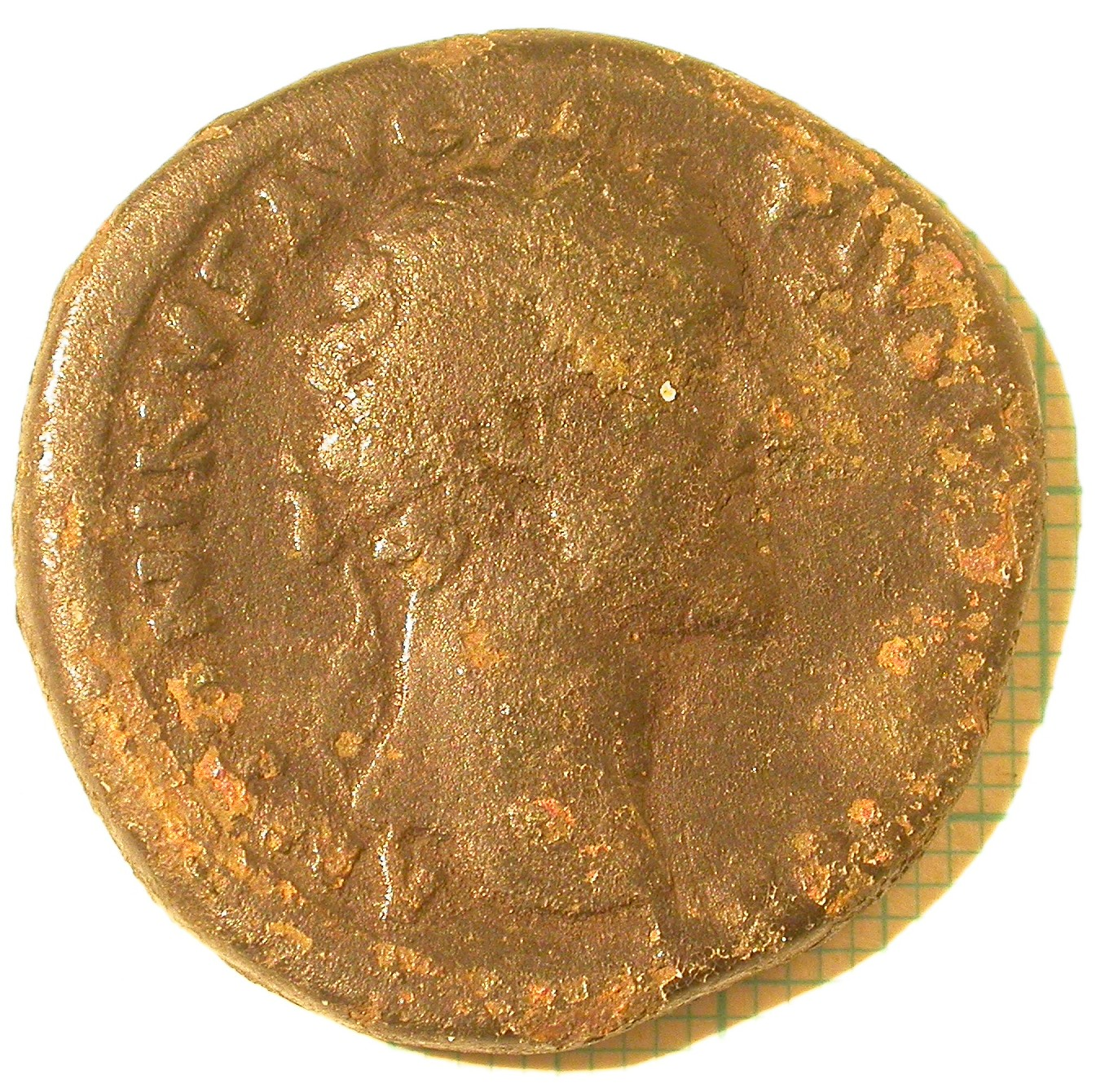
A copper-alloy sestertius dating to the reign of Antoninus Pius (138–161), found in Staines in 2004

By the mid-2nd century, Staines had increased in size and prosperity and the early Romano-British roundhouses had been replaced by stone buildings with flint and rag-stone foundations. Fragments of painted, plastered wall and floors of opus signinum have been uncovered, and the presence of tesserae indicates that at least one building had a mosaic floor. A collyrium stamp, found during an excavation of 73–75 High Street, suggests that there was a healer living in the town, who could have administered to the wider local population. Staines declined towards the end of the 2nd century, possibly as a result of an increased incidence of winter flooding. Nevertheless, Romano-British settlement activity continued until the early 4th century, although the town appears to have been smaller and less important than it had been in the first half of the Roman period.

Following the end of Roman rule in Britain, the main settlement at Staines appears to have shifted from the High Street area to the Binbury area surrounding St Mary's Church. (Note: River defences along the Thames, tentatively dated to the mid-late Saxon period, suggest that the High Street Island was liable to flooding and this may have favoured the relocation of the settlement to the Binbury Island.) Archaeological evidence, including pits, ditches and pottery sherds suggests that there was a permanent settlement in this area by the mid-Saxon period and there may have been a marketplace at the northern end of Church Street. Staines may have been a fortified burh and the location of a minster church. (Note: The Domesday Book entry for East Burnham in Buckinghamshire, also held by Westminster Abbey, mentions a "monasterium of Stanes".) A late-Saxon execution cemetery on London Road, containing the incomplete remains of up to thirty skeletons, suggests that the town was also an important local centre for the administration of justice.

For much of the early Saxon period, the Thames through Staines marked the border between Middlesex (to the north) and Surrey (to the south). In the 9th century, the river was used by Danish Viking raiders to travel into the heart of England. In 993, the Norwegian King, Olaf Tryggvason, sailed up the Thames to Staines with a fleet of 93 ships. In 1009, a large army of Vikings attacked Oxford and retreated back along the banks of the Thames, crossing the river at Staines.

=== Governance ===
Between 1042 and 1052, Edward the Confessor rebuilt Westminster Abbey as a royal burial church and endowed it with around 60 estates in the south east of England. Staines was one of the properties granted to the Abbey and remained in its possession until the Reformation. In 1086, the manor appears in the Middlesex section of Domesday Book as Stanes. In 1086, the manor had land for 24 ploughs, six mills and woodland for 30 pigs. It provided an annual income of £35 for the Abbey. Since it was relatively close to Westminster, Staines acted as a home farm, providing for the abbot's personal household. 13th-century abbey records indicate that a market was taking place by 1218 and, in 1225, there were 46 burgesses living in the settlement, suggesting that Staines had become an important local centre.

Westminster Abbey was dissolved in 1540 and Staines then became a possession of the Crown, allowing Henry VIII to extend his Windsor hunting grounds further to the east. In 1613, James I granted the manor to Thomas Knyvet, who had arrested Guy Fawkes at the Palace of Westminster eight years earlier. Following Knyvet's death, Staines passed to Sir Francis Leigh and, following the Restoration of the Monarchy, it was held briefly by Sir William Drake. The manor was then purchased by Richard Taylor, whose descendants lived at Knowle Green until the 19th century.

Reforms during the Tudor period reduced the importance of manorial courts and the day-to-day administration of towns such as Staines became the responsibility of the vestry of the parish church. The vestry appointed a constable, distributed funds to the poor and took charge of the repair of local roads. From the 17th century, the roles of Justices of the Peace were expanded to take greater responsibility for law and order in Staines.

The modern system of local government began to emerge during the 19th century. The Poor Law Amendment Act 1834 transferred responsibility for poor relief to the Poor Law Commission, whose local powers were delegated to the newly formed poor law union in 1836. (Note: The Staines Poor Law Union was responsible for administering poor relief in 12 parishes in west Middlesex.) In 1885 a local school board was established and three years later, the Local Government Act 1888 created the Middlesex County Council. An Urban District Council (UDC) and a Rural District Council (RDC) for the area were established in 1895 under the Local Government Act 1894, but the RDC was merged into the UDC in 1930.

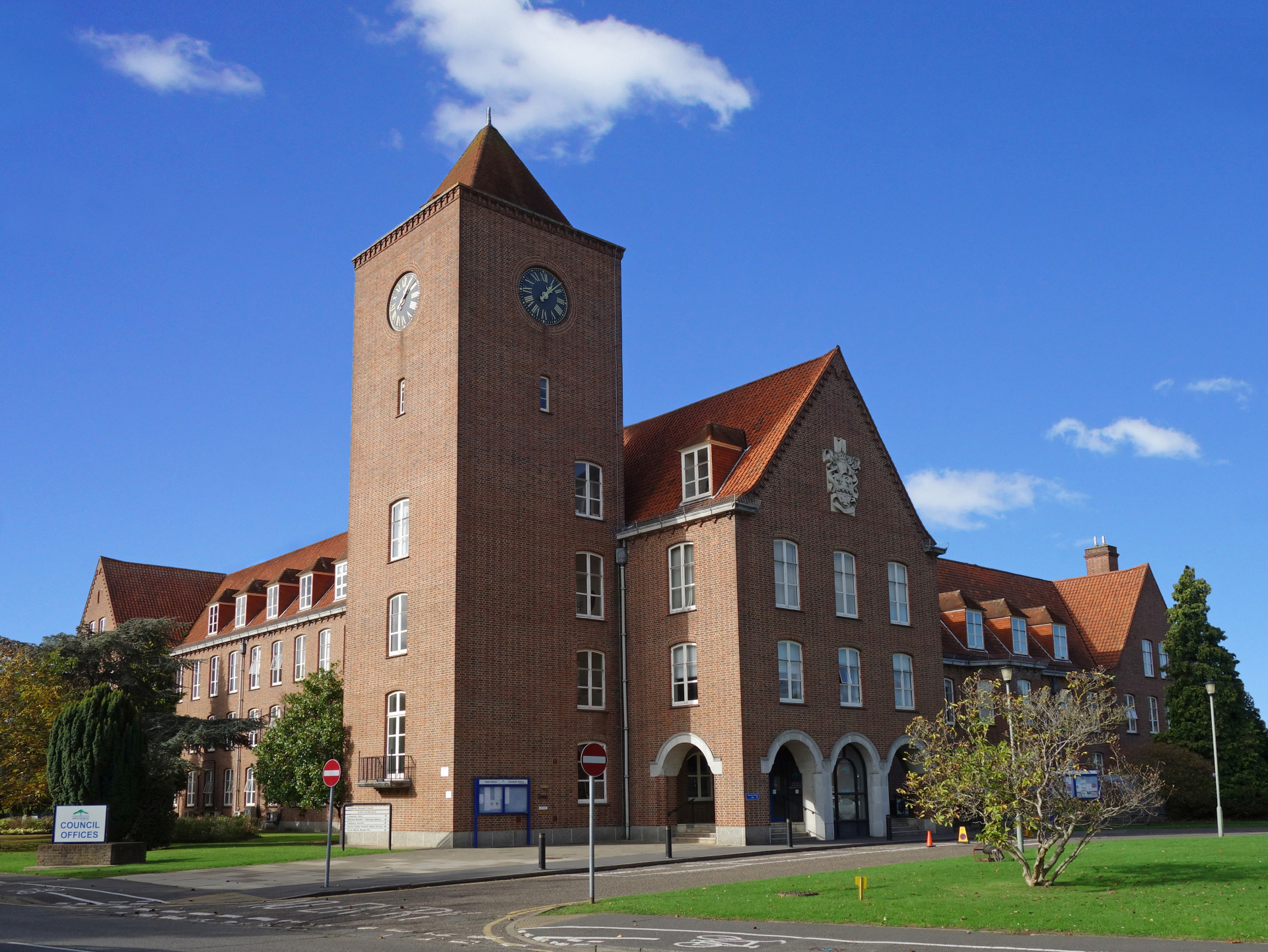
Spelthorne Borough Council offices, Knowle Green, were opened in 1972.

Further reorganisation of the local authorities took place in the second half of the 20th century. Under the London Government Act 1963, Middlesex County Council was disbanded and the Staines UDC area was moved into Surrey. The Local Government Act 1972, which came into force on 1 April 1974, merged the Staines and Sunbury-on-Thames UDCs to form the Borough of Spelthorne.

=== Staines Bridge ===
The first surviving mention of a bridge from the medieval period is a document from 1222, that authorises repairs using wood cut from Windsor Forest. In around 1250, a causeway was constructed at Egham Hythe to improve the southern approach to the crossing. (Note: It has been suggested that the Egham Hythe causeway may have originally been built by the Romans and that the work in the mid-13th century was a repair or extension, rather than a new construction.) Also during the 13th century, there were renewals of the grant of pontage and, in 1376, tolls were levied on boat traffic to provide additional funds for maintenance. Local people left bequests for not only the repair of the bridge, but also the upkeep of the roads leading to it on each side of the river.

The bridge was destroyed in the Civil War and was not rebuilt until the 1680s. In 1734, an Act of Parliament noted that the structure was "in a ruinous and dangerous condition" and that the money raised from tolls and local taxes was insufficient to fund adequate maintenance. In the late 18th and early 19th centuries, there were four attempts to construct a new bridge. The first, designed by Thomas Sandby, was opened in 1796, but was closed two years later after cracks started to form in the stonework. A cast-iron replacement, designed by James Wilson in consultation with George Rennie was opened in 1803, but cracked within two months. A third bridge was authorised by Act of Parliament in 1804. It was designed by Rennie and was constructed of timber, strengthened with cast iron plates. Although it did not suffer from the problems of the previous two bridges, it was costly to maintain (£11,000 in 1827) and restricted the width of boats passing beneath it.

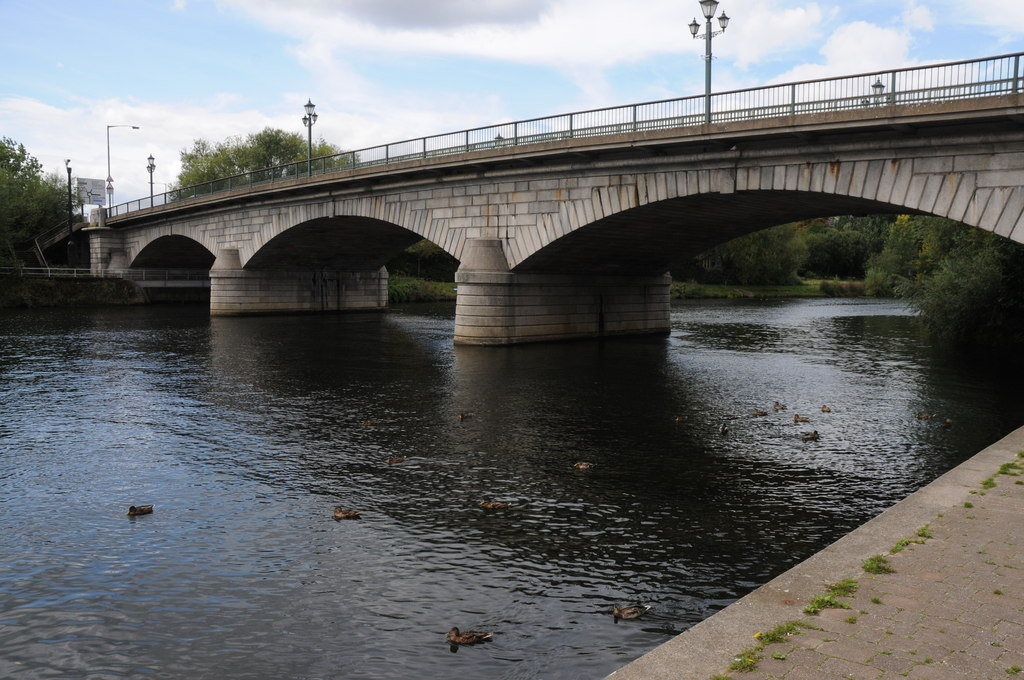
Staines Bridge, opened 1832

A further Act of Parliament in 1828, authorised the borrowing of up to £60,000 for the construction of a fourth bridge. The granite structure was designed by George Rennie and was based on Waterloo Bridge. Rennie insisted that the site of the crossing be moved upstream, where deeper foundations could be constructed. The repositioning required new approach roads to be constructed and the necessary land was subject to compulsory purchase. The foundation stones were laid on each side of the river in September 1829 and William IV opened the bridge in April 1832. Tolls for crossing the bridge were abolished in 1871.

=== Transport and communications ===
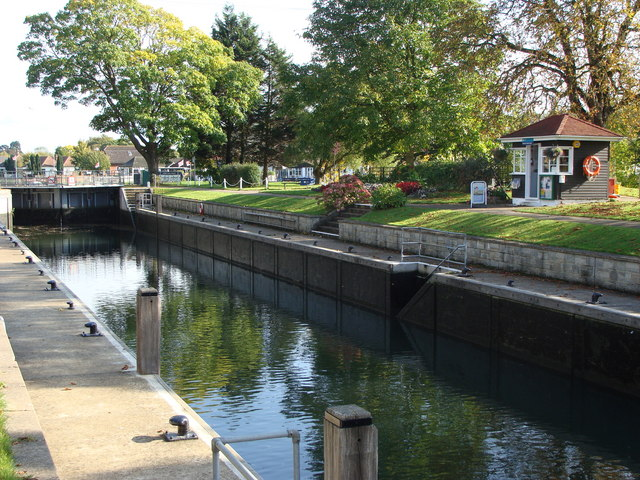
Penton Hook Lock, River Thames

The earliest locks on the upper Thames were built in the 17th century, following the establishment of the Oxford-Burcot Commission. However, efforts to improve the stretch of the river through Staines did not start until the 19th century. The pound lock at Penton Hook, a tight meander downstream of Staines, was constructed in 1815, but the weirs were not added until 1846. (Note: The current Penton Hook Lock dates from 1909 and has a fall of 1.2 m (3.9 ft). The lock chamber is the third longest on the Thames.) Bell Weir Lock, upstream of the town, opened in 1818, but was rebuilt in 1867–8 after the chamber walls had collapsed the previous year. The construction of the locks regulated the flow of the river and increased its depth to facilitate navigation, whilst maintaining an adequate head of water to power mills.

With the exception of the construction of the causeway at Egham Hythe in the mid-13th century, there were few improvements in the local road network in the millennium following the end of the Roman period. In 1727, the turnpike road from Hounslow to Bagshot, which crossed the river via Staines Bridge, was opened. A second turnpike, from Staines to Kingston opened in 1773. The re-siting of the bridge by George Rennie in the early 1830s necessitated changes in the road network at the western end of the High Street: The Market Square became a no through road and Clarence Street was constructed to direct traffic to the new crossing.

The railway line through Staines between Richmond and Datchet was opened by the Windsor, Staines and South Western Railway on 22 August 1848. In 1856, Staines became a junction when the line across the Thames to Ascot was opened. A curve linking the Ascot and Datchet lines was opened in April 1877 and remained in use until March 1965. A second station in the town, Staines High Street station, to the northwest of the junction of this curve and the Datchet line, was open between 1884 and 1916. The railway line through Staines to Windsor was electrified in June 1930 and to Virginia Water in 1937. Staines signal box closed in September 1974.

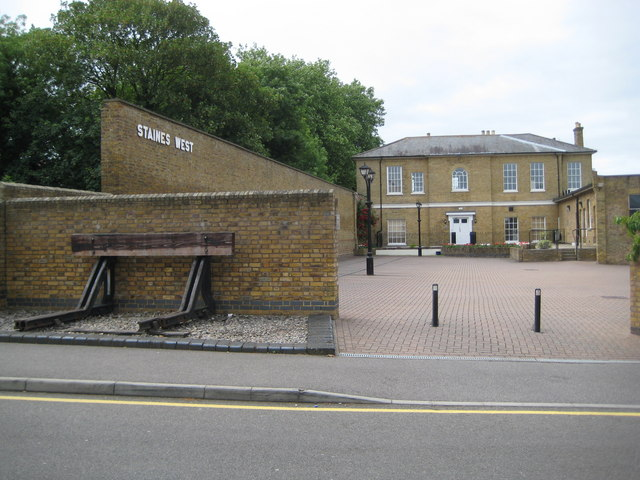
The former Staines West railway station

A third station in the town was opened on 2 November 1885. Staines West was the terminus of a single-track branch from the Great Western Main Line, constructed by the Staines and West Drayton Railway Company. Originally the intention had been to create a junction with the line from Datchet and for trains to serve the main Staines station, but inter-company rivalry meant that a separate facility was built instead. The freight yard closed in the 1950s and passenger services ceased in March 1965. Trains continued to run to the Staines fuel yard, at Staines West, until the early 1990s.

During the second half of the 20th century, there were large-scale improvements to the road network around Staines. The A30 bypass was constructed in the early 1960s and included the building of Runnymede Bridge over the Thames. (Note: The A30 Runnymede Bridge was designed by Edwin Lutyens in 1939. The original design was modified to use a single 173.5 ft wide (52.9 m) arch across the main river channel, before construction began in the 1960s.) A second bridge, alongside the first, was required for the construction of the M25. The route of the motorway north of Staines was constrained by the Wraysbury Reservoir to the west and Staines Moor to the west. The Chertsey to Staines stretch of the M25 was opened in November 1981 with three lanes in each direction, but with a wide central reservation, allowing the road to be widened easily later. Four lanes in each direction were provided from outset between the A30 and the M4. (Note: The short stretch of the M25 between Staines and Chertsey was opened before neighbouring sections were completed, as it crossed the M3 and it was hoped that this stretch would help to ease the distribution of traffic from Hampshire onto the local Surrey and west London road network.)

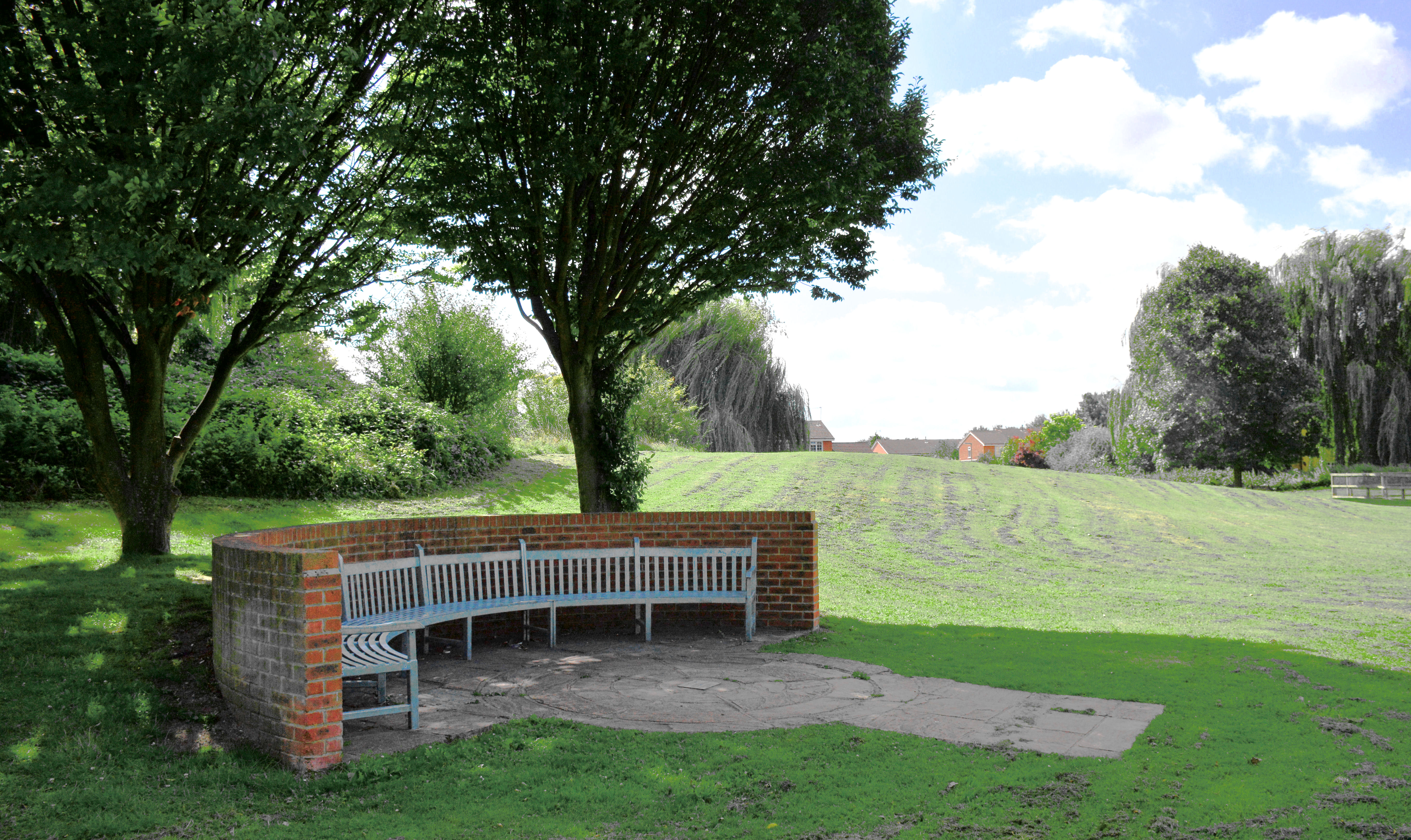
Memorial to those who died in the Staines air disaster

The Staines air disaster occurred on 18 June 1972, when a Hawker Siddeley Trident, operated by British European Airways, crashed shortly after takeoff from Heathrow Airport. All 118 people aboard the aircraft, including the six crew members, were killed. Two memorials to all the victims were dedicated on 18 June 2004 in Staines. The first is a stained-glass window in St Mary's Church where an annual memorial service is held on 18 June. The second is a garden near the end of Waters Drive in the Moormede Estate, close to the accident site. (Note: The Staines air disaster was the worst aircraft crash in the UK until the bombing of Pan Am flight 103 over Lockerbie on 21 December 1988.)

=== Commerce and industry ===
The first record of a market at Staines is from 1218, when the Sheriff of Middlesex was ordered to change the day on which it was held from Sunday to Friday. It had been discontinued by 1862, but re-established ten years later when the Town Hall was built. In 2022, the market is held in the High Street on Wednesdays, Fridays and Saturdays. An annual fair to be held in the settlement was granted to Westminster Abbey by Henry III in 1228. Initially it took place over four days at Ascensiontide, but the dates were changed to 7–10 September in 1241. By 1792, there were two one-day fairs each year, the first on 11 May for horses and cattle and the second on 19 September, known as the Onion Fair, for produce and trinkets. The fairs were abolished in 1896 by the Home Secretary at the request of the Staines UDC.

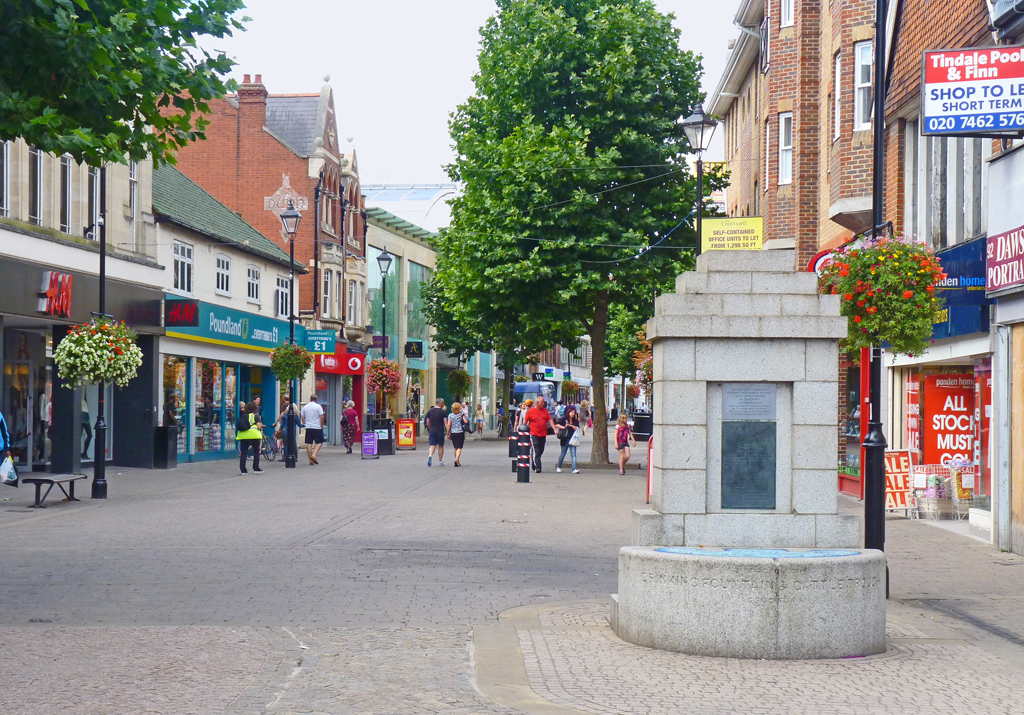
The Metropolitan Drinking Fountain (right) erected in 1885 was relocated to the High Street in 2002 as a non-functional monument

Domesday Book records six mills in Staines in 1086, one of which is thought to have been at Yeoveney on Staines Moor. The site, close to the Wraysbury River, an anabranch of the River Colne, is thought to have been the location of a late-medieval dye works and part of the mill was used for fulling in the 14th century. First recorded in 1682, Pound Mill was also on the Wraysbury River. It was bought by John Finch in 1747 and was a flour mill until the early 19th century, when it was used to grind mustard. The mill is immortalised in the road name, "Mustard Mill Road".

Hale Mill, on the main channel of the Colne, is thought to have its origins in the 13th century, but it was rebuilt in 1388 and became a fulling mill in the 15th century. Many of the mills in the local area were purchased in the second half of the 18th century by Thomas Ashby, a miller originally from Maidenhead. Ashby founded a brewery, subsequently taken over by his sons, which became a major employer in the town. Brewing ceased in Staines in the 1950s, but bottling continued at the plant until the 1970s.

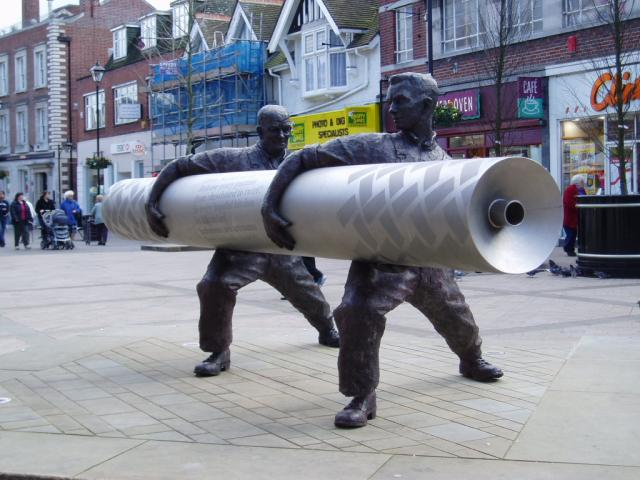
Release every pattern, by David Annand, celebrates linoleum manufacture in Staines.

Staines became a centre for linoleum manufacture in 1864, when Frederick Walton, the inventor, opened the first factory to produce the floor covering on the Hale Mill site, to the north of the town centre. At its height in the 1920s, the Staines plant covered 20 ha (49 acres) and was one of twenty producers in Great Britain. Following the end of the Second World War, there was a decline in lino sales as vinyl floor coverings became more popular. The Staines lino factory closed in 1973.

The Elmsleigh Shopping Centre was opened by Elizabeth II on 22 February 1980, providing 250,000 sq ft (23,000 m^{2}) of retail space. (Note: The Elmsleigh Centre was named after Elmsleigh House, the late-Victorian residence of the Ashby family, which was later used as offices by the Staines UDC.) Much of the High Street was pedestrianised in 2002 and the Two Rivers Shopping Centre, on the site of the old linoleum works, was opened in 2002.

In the 21st century, proximity to London, Heathrow Airport and the M25 motorway has attracted large company branch offices, including: Bupa (healthcare) and Wood plc (oil & gas). Siemens Building Automation Division and British Gas (part of Centrica) have their national headquarters here. Samsung R&D Institute UK (SRUK), Samsung's UK R&D division, is based in the town.

=== Residential development ===
The modern settlement of Staines appears to have originated in the late 12th century, when the area around the High Street was developed as a planned town, possibly in response to rebuilding the bridge over the Thames. The medieval street plan was not altered until the re-siting of the bridge in the 1830s, at which point the urban area began to spread beyond the confines of the gravel islands.

The population of Staines grew from 1,750 in 1801 to 2,487 in 1841 and 4,638 in 1881. The increase in the second half of the 19th century was stimulated in part by the arrival of the railway in 1848. Cottages for artisans and semi-skilled workers began to spread along the London and Kingston Roads from the mid-19th century onwards. The residential roads to the south and southeast of the town centre were created in the early 1930s. Following the Second World War, there were new housing developments on Commercial Road and between Kingston Road and Elizabeth Avenue, primarily to provide accommodation for workers at the rapidly expanding Heathrow Airport.

=== Staines in the Second World War ===
Despite its proximity to London and the fact that Staines Bridge and the local factories presented obvious enemy targets, the town sustained relatively little bomb damage during the Second World War. There was a severe bombing raid on Staines on the night of 24–25 August 1940 and a V-1 flying bomb landed at the junction of Stanish Crescent and Kingston Road on 19 June 1944, killing four people and injuring a further 17. Within the Staines Urban District, a total 71 civilians died as result of enemy action. The Lagonda works at Egham Hythe were converted to the manufacture of munitions and the linoleum factory was dedicated to making military supplies.

Much of the civil defence effort was focused on the defence of Staines Bridge and tank traps were installed at each end. At the start of the war, a Bailey bridge was constructed across the Thames, in case the main bridge was damaged by bombing. The Bailey bridge remained in use for pedestrians until 1959, when it was dismantled.

== National and local government ==
=== UK parliament ===
The town is in the parliamentary constituency of Spelthorne, and has been represented by Conservative Party MP Lincoln Jopp since 2024. From 2010 until the 2024 general election, Staines was represented at Westminster by Conservative Kwasi Kwarteng. Kwarteng was Chancellor of the Exchequer for 38 days during the 49 day premiership of Liz Truss.

=== County council ===
Councillors are elected to Surrey County Council every four years. The majority of the town is in the Staines electoral division, but areas to the southeast of the centre are in the Staines South and Ashford West electoral division.

=== Borough council ===
Staines is divided between three wards, each of which elects three councillors to Spelthorne Borough Council. The wards are Staines, Staines South, and Riverside and Laleham. The Borough of Spelthorne has been twinned with Melun, France since 1990 and with Grand Port, Mauritius since 2009.

As part of the upcoming structural changes to local government in England both Spelthorne Borough Council and Surrey County Council are due to be replaced by West Surrey. The first elections for West Surrey took place on 4 May 2026 and it will continue to be a "shadow authority" until it replaces its predecessor councils on 1 April 2027.

== Demography and housing ==
2011 Census Key Statistics
Output area	Population	Households	% Owned outright	% Owned with a loan	hectares
Staines (ward)	7,861	3,528	24.0%	33.8%	550
Staines South (ward)	7,123	2,899	29.9%	37.7%	131
Spelthorne 009B (riverside north)	1,818	862	37.6%	37.5%	35
Spelthorne 009C (riverside south)	1,662	723	51.5%	39.1%	70
Regional average			35.1%	32.5%	

2011 Census Homes
Output area	Detached	Semi-detached	Terraced	Flats and apartments	Caravans/temporary/mobile homes	shared between households
Staines (ward)	387	844	843	1,439	2	13
Staines South (ward)	197	1,505	702	492	1	2
Spelthorne 009B (riverside north)	174	225	93	365	0	5
Spelthorne 009C (riverside south)	369	96	109	148	1	0

Across the South East Region, 28% of homes were detached houses and 22.6% were apartments.

== Public services ==
=== Utilities ===
The first drinking water supply to Staines was provided by the West Surrey Water Company, whose works at Egham were built in 1889. Between 1960 and 1973, the company merged with its neighbours serving Woking and south west London, to form the North Surrey Water Company. (Note: The water stored by the reservoirs to the north of Staines is used to supply London and not the Borough of Spelthorne.) Today, Affinity Water is responsible for supplying the town with drinking water.

Until the start of the 20th century, wastewater from Staines was discharged directly into the River Thames. Construction of the sewerage system began in 1899. The works closed in 1936, when the town sewers were connected to Mogden Sewage Works in Isleworth.

The Staines and Egham District Gas and Coke Company was formed in 1834. It began to supply gas from its works in Bedfont Lane in Egham Hythe to the streetlamps on Staines Bridge in February of that year and the gas main to Staines was laid in 1835. At the start of the First World War, the Staines and Egham company was acquired by the Brentford Gas Company, which in 1949, following further mergers and acquisitions, became the North Thames Gas Board. A 177 ft-high (54 m) gasometer was constructed in Staines in 1927 and was demolished in 1986.

The first electricity generating station serving Staines opened in Egham High Street in 1905. It operated until 1912, when it was replaced by at new facility on The Causeway in Egham Hythe. The new works opened with an installed capacity of 188 kW and, by the time of its closure in 1924, it was capable of generating 688 kW.

=== Emergency services and justice ===
The earliest record of a permanent fire-fighting force in Staines is from 1738, when a hand-operated fire pump was purchased for the brigade. Reforms in 1774 transferred responsibility for fire services to the local authority and, in 1800, a new manual fire engine was purchased by the Staines force. The Staines UDC purchased the first diesel engine for the brigade in 1926, which was replaced by a Leyland terrier pump escape engine in 1935. Middlesex County Council took over responsibility for local fire services on 1 April 1948, building a new fire station at Stanwell and closing the Staines station in 1962. Surrey County Council became the fire authority for the local area in 1965.

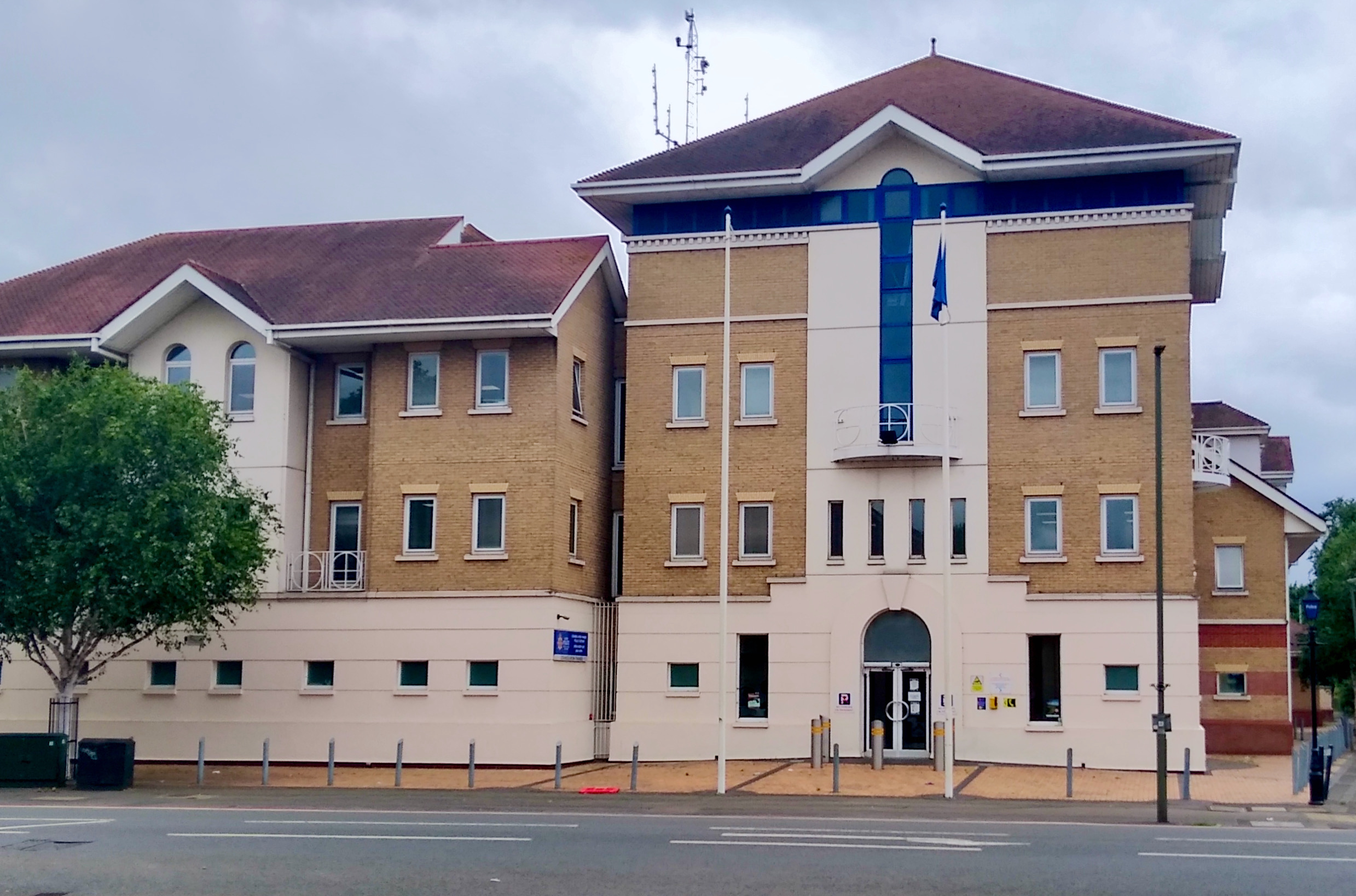
Staines Police Station, opened 1998

The first surviving record of a town gaol in Staines is from 1274 and the erection of a new pillory and ducking stool is described in 1335. There were stocks in the Market Square through the 16th century until at least 1790. The vestry appointed the town Constable from the early 15th century until 1840, when responsibility for law enforcement was passed to the Metropolitan Police. In 1865, the police station moved to Kingston Road, later the site of the candle factory. The force relocated to a second station on Kingston Road in 1876 and moved again to new premises on the same street in 1998. In 2022, the local police force is Surrey Police.

The magistrates' courts at Knowle Green, opposite the Spelthorne Borough Council offices, were opened in 1976.

=== Healthcare ===
Staines Cottage Hospital was opened on 19 May 1914 on the corner of Kingston Road and Worple Road. It was renamed Staines Hospital in 1933, but its importance decreased following the opening of Ashford Hospital in 1939. During the 1960s, the men's wards were shut and it became a hospital for female patients only. It closed in the early 1980s and the buildings were demolished in 1986. The Kingscroft respite service for adults with learning difficulties opened on the site in 1987.

The nearest hospital with an A&E is St Peter's Hospital, 3.9 mi (6.3 km) from Staines-upon-Thames. As of 2022, the town has GP practices at Burgess Way, Knowle Green and on Rochester Road.

== Transport ==
=== Bus ===
Staines is linked by a number of bus routes to surrounding towns and villages in north Surrey, south west London (including Heathrow Airport) and east Berkshire. Operators serving the town include London United, First Berkshire & The Thames Valley and White Bus Services. The bus station is to the south of the Elmsleigh Centre.

=== Train ===
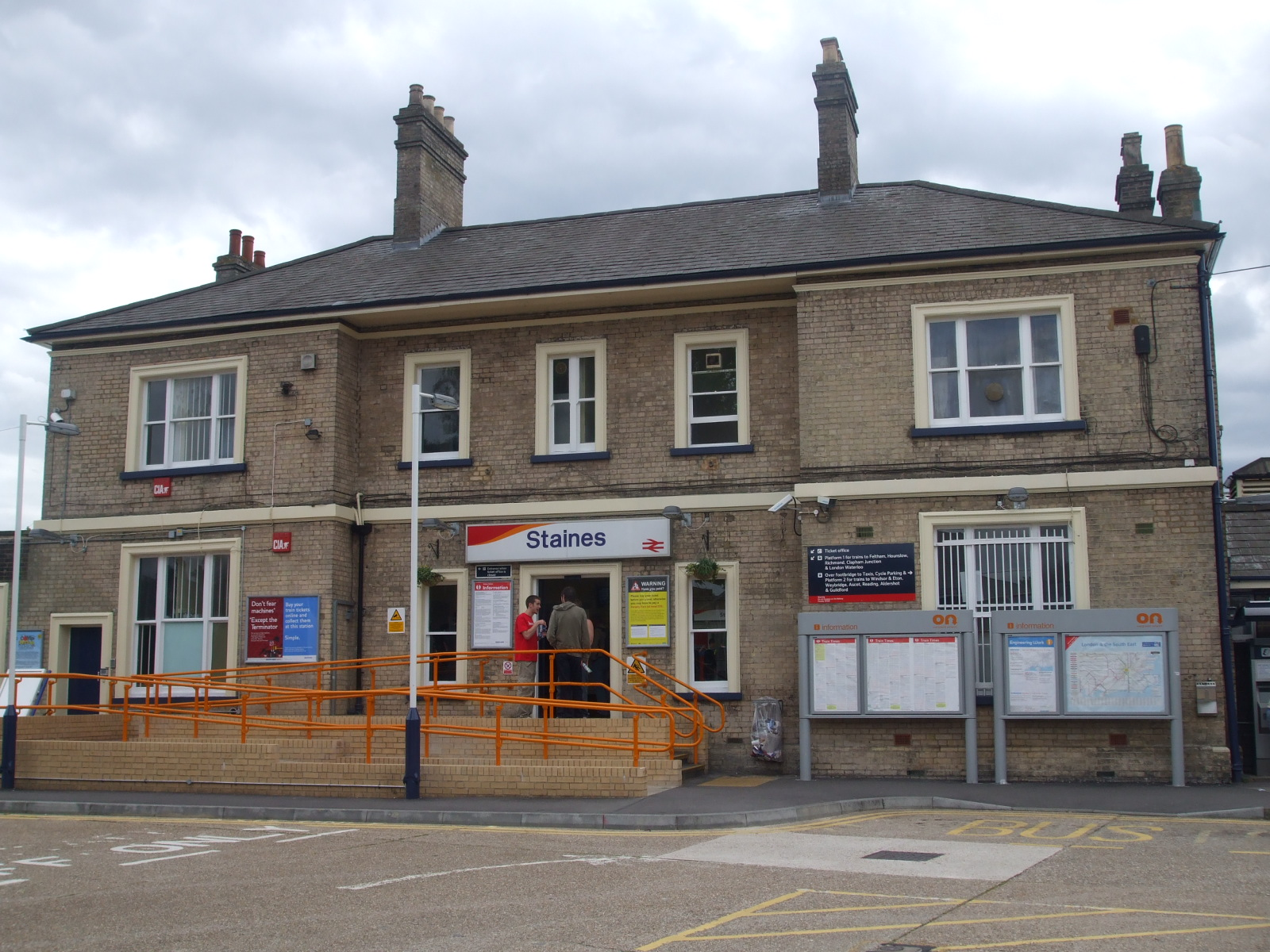
Staines railway station main building, seen from the north

Staines railway station is to the east of the town centre. It is managed by South Western Railway, which operates all services. Trains run to London Waterloo via Clapham Junction, to Reading via Ascot and to Windsor and Eton Riverside via Datchet.

=== River navigation ===
The non-tidal section of the River Thames is navigable between Lechlade in Gloucestershire and Teddington Lock. The navigation authority is the Environment Agency. (Note: Penton Hook Marina was opened in 1960 on the site of a former gravel pit. Today it covers an area of 80 acres (32 ha) and is the largest inland marina in England.)

=== Long-distance cycle route and footpath ===
National Cycle Route 4, which links London to Fishguard, passes through Staines. The Thames Path crosses Staines Bridge.

== Education ==
=== Early schools ===
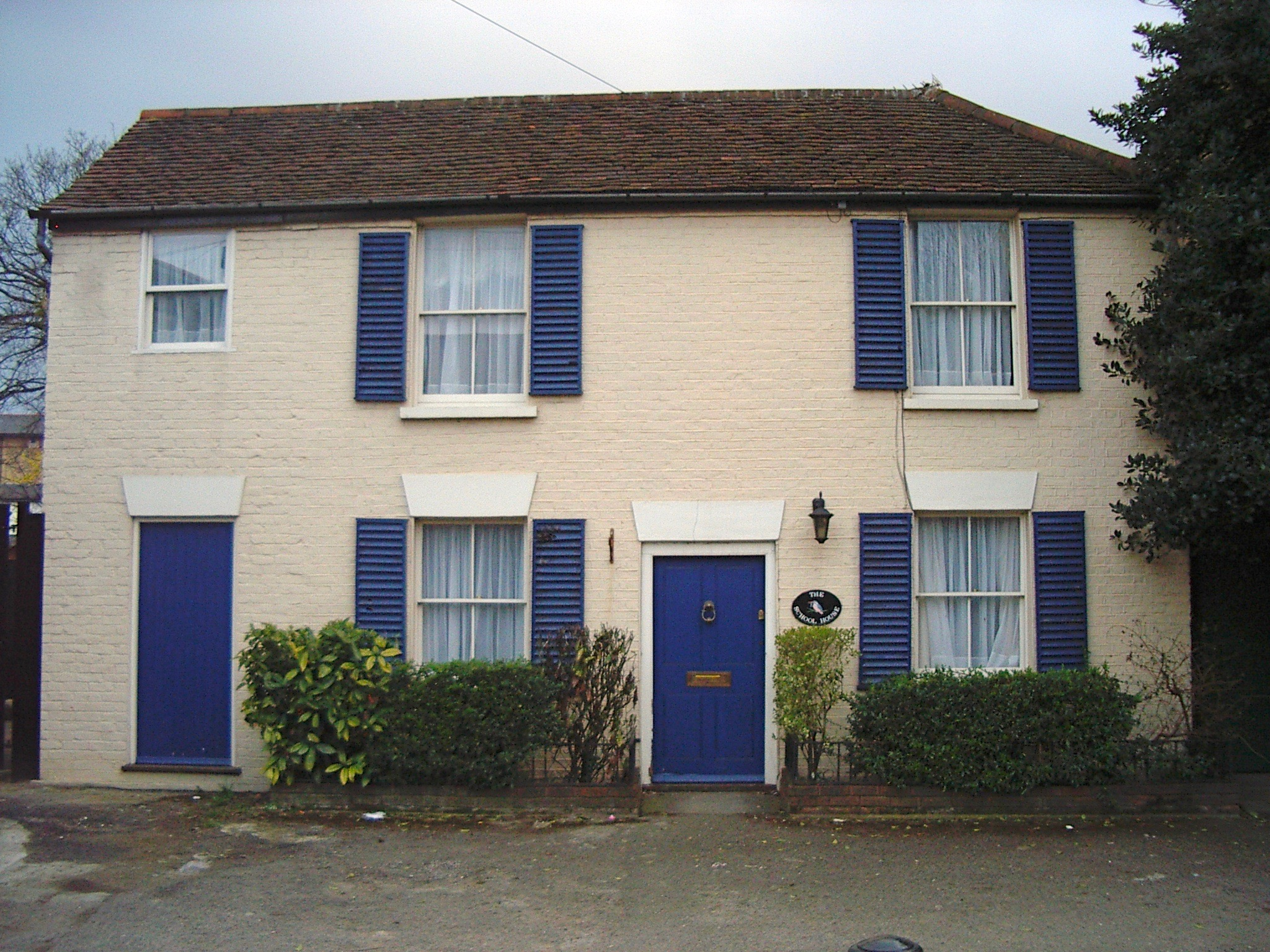
The old school house on Thames Street

The surviving first record of a schoolmaster in Staines is from 1353 and there are mentions of later postholders in documents dating from 1580 to 1673. However, by the 18th century, it appears that there was no dedicated teacher living in the town and, in 1795, the parish clerk was in receipt of a modest salary to teach four children. The British Boys' School in Staines was founded in 1808 and the girls' school was in existence by 1832. By 1852, the boys' school was in Hale Street and was educating around 35 pupils. An infants' school was founded in 1833, which moved with the girls school to Thames Street in 1867. The two schools moved again to larger premises in the same road, but the 1867 schoolhouse still survives behind the shop fronts. National Schools for boys and girls were established in 1818 and in the mid-1820s respectively, but both closed for around a decade before reopening in the mid-1840s. The girls' school moved to new premises in Bridge Street in 1850 and the boys' school relocated to London Road in 1863.

=== Maintained schools ===
Riverbridge Primary School was formed from the merger of three predecessor schools in September 2011. The oldest was Shortwood Infant School, which opened in 1905 as the Stanwell Road School. Knowle Park School opened in 1974, but had its origins in the Wyatt Road School which was formed in 1896. Kingscroft Junior School opened in 1992 and replaced Kingston Road School, which had opened in 1903. Riverbridge Primary School operated across three sites, until September 2014, when the former Shortwood Infant School premises were closed. The school became part of the Lumen Learning Trust in Autumn 2016.

Our Lady of the Rosary Catholic Primary School was founded in 1893.

The construction of the Matthew Arnold School started in 1939, but work was suspended at the outbreak of the Second World War. However, parts of the building were sufficiently close to completion to allow pupils aged 11 to 14 from Kingston Road School to transfer to the site, after their classrooms were damaged by bombing. The school formally opened in 1954.

=== Independent school ===
Staines Preparatory School was founded by Cyril Travers Burges and opened on 8 May 1935. The original premises were at 1 Gresham Road, but the school moved to number 3 in 1938 and expanded to number 5 in 1951. The Burges Wing was constructed in 1991; the Jubilee Wing was built in 2002, and was extended in 2008. Today, Staines Prep School educates boys and girls between the ages of 3 and 11.

== Places of worship ==
=== St Mary's Church ===
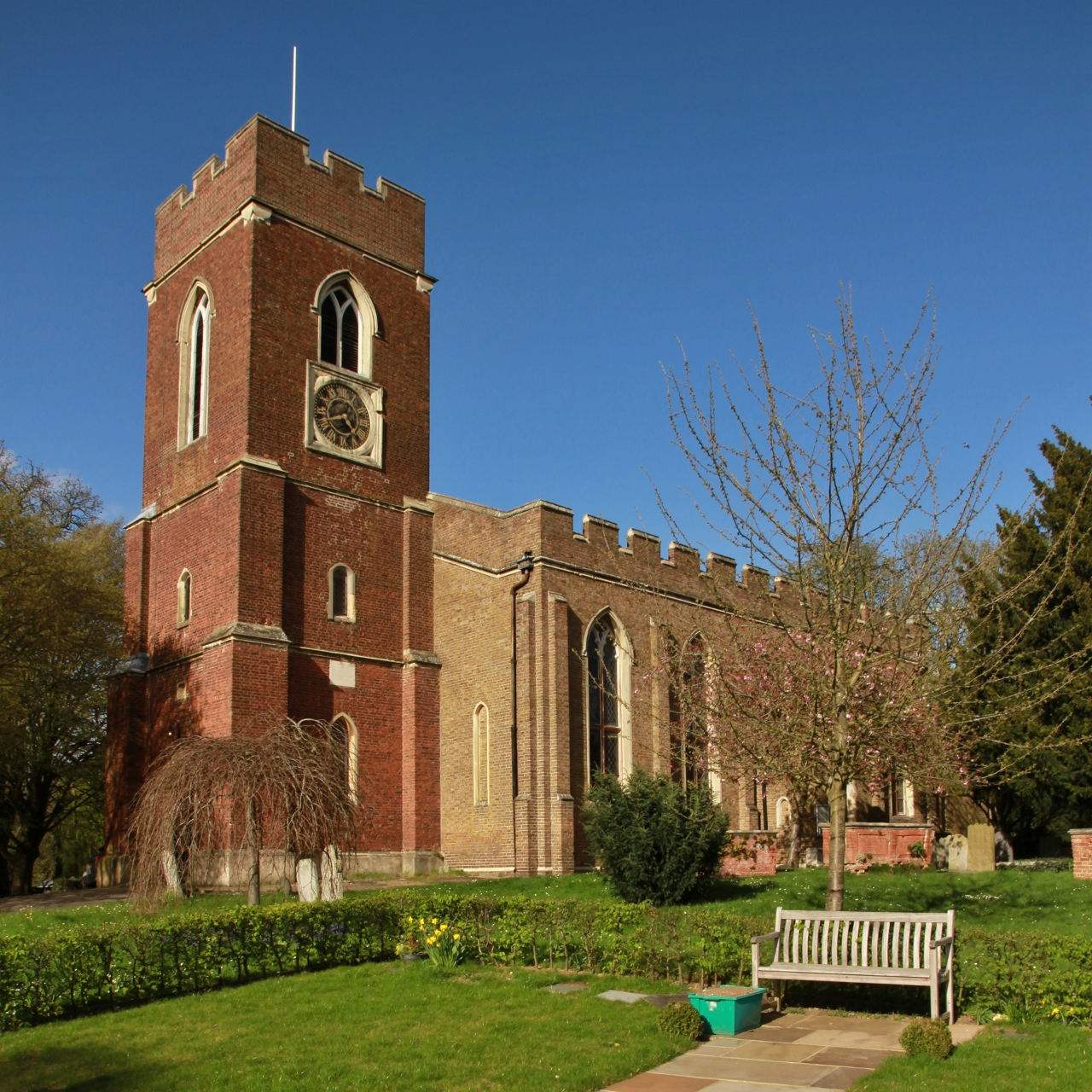
St Mary's Church

St Mary's Church is first recorded in 1179, but it is thought to have been in existence for at least 100 years before that. There is no mention of a church in Domesday Book, but there may have been a place of worship on the site since the 9th century. By the end of the medieval period, St Mary's had a chancel, nave and an aisle on the north side. It was primarily built of brick in the Gothic style and the tower at the west end was added in 1631.

The condition of the church deteriorated in the late 17th and 18th century, due in part to the sale of the lead from the roof of the aisle to fund the Parliamentarian cause in the Civil War. The north side of the building collapsed in 1827 and a new church was built in 1828–9, incorporating the 17th-century tower. Among the stained glass panels in the church is a window behind the altar, given by the Crown Prince and Crown Princess of Prussia. In 2005, a window was dedicated to those who died in the 1972 Staines air disaster.

=== St Peter's Church ===
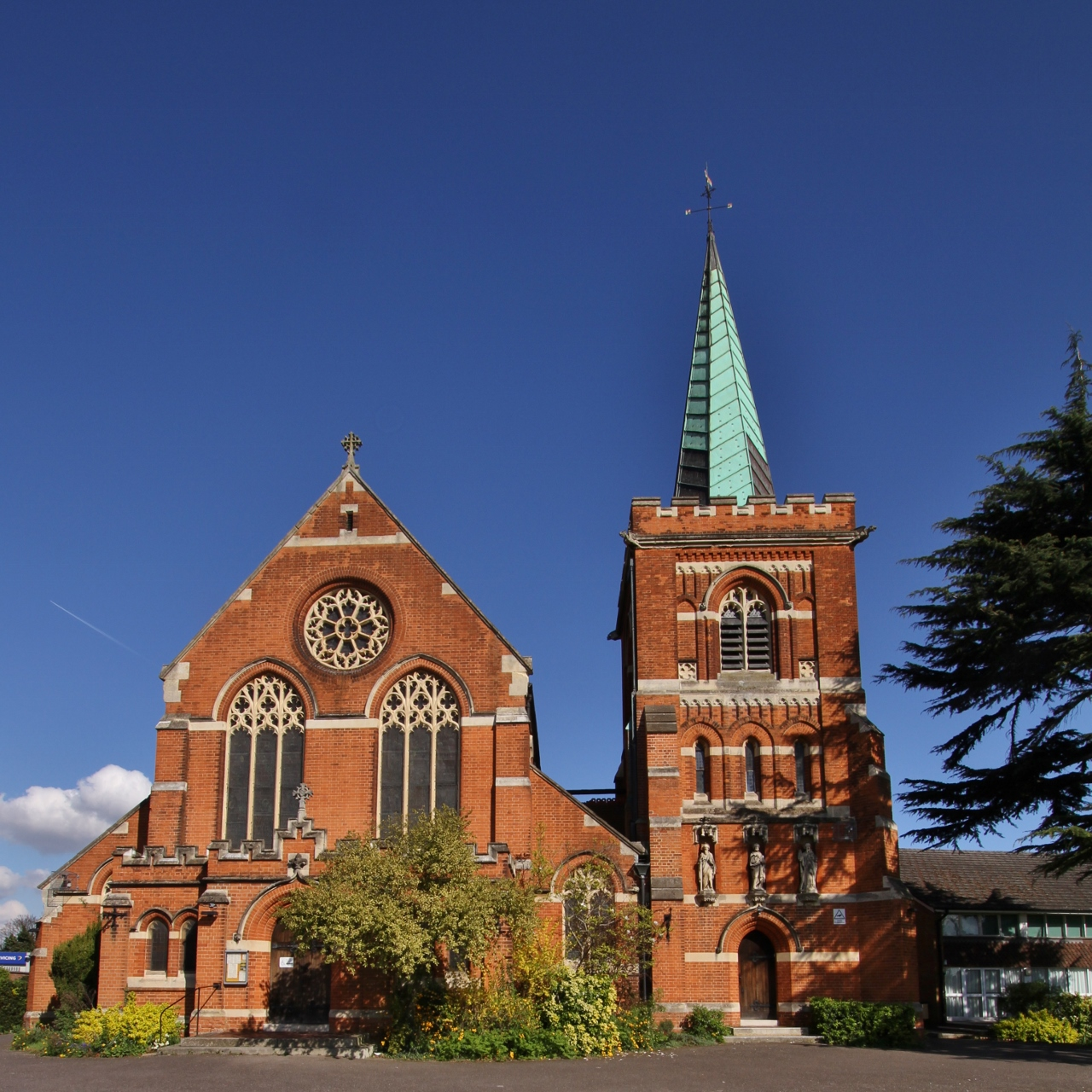
St Peter's Church

St Peter's Church was founded as a chapel of ease to St Mary's in 1874. A brick building was constructed at the corner of Wyatt and Langley Roads and was used until 1885, when the congregation moved to an iron church on the corner of Edgell and Budebury Roads. (Note: The iron church was purchased from a congregation in North London and was dismantled and transported to Staines. The cost of the building was paid for by public conscription.)

The foundation stone for the current St Peter's Church was laid on 22 July 1893 and the building was consecrated on 28 July the following year. It was designed by George Fellowes Prynne in the free Perpendicular style and the cost of construction was paid by the Solicitor General, Edward Clarke MP. The crenellated tower is topped with a set-back spire, and contains a ring of eight bells. (Note: The artificial mound on which St Peter's Church is built was formed by material excavated from land to the south, resulting in the small lake behind the Riverbank Apartments.)

=== Christ Church ===
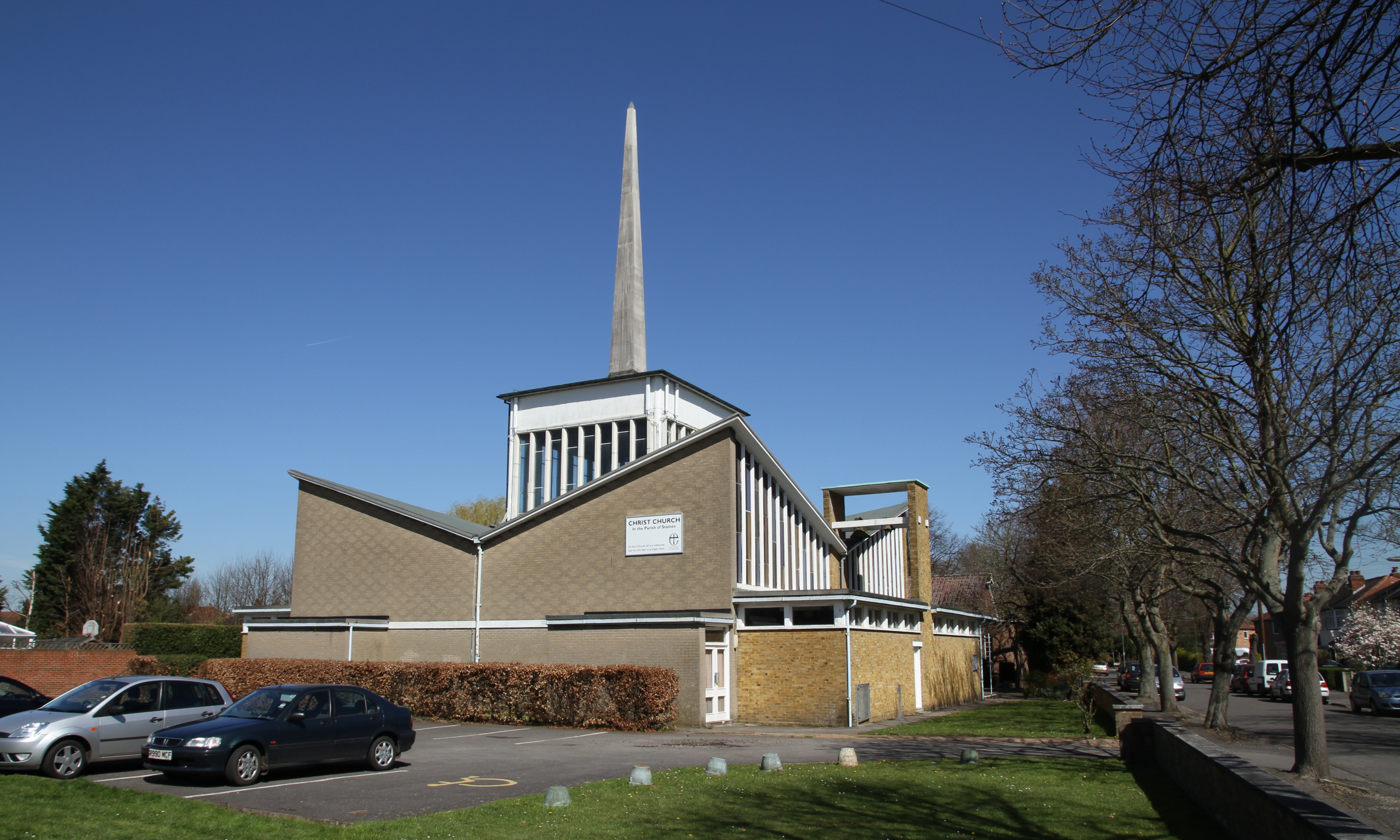
Christ Church

The first Christ Church, in Kenilworth Gardens, was constructed in 1935 to serve the new area of housing along Kingston Road to the southeast of the town centre. The brick building was able to accommodate 280 worshippers, and a sliding partition at the west end of the chancel allowed the nave to be used as a church hall. The parish of Christ Church was created in 1951 and a decade later construction of a new church began on the same site as the old. The new Christ Church, consecrated in October 1962, has a centrally placed altar positioned beneath a square lantern. The lantern allows natural light into the interior of the building and is topped with a narrow spire. The font, which dates from 1750, was given to the congregation in 1935, and was previously installed in St Mary's Church.

=== Staines Methodist Church ===
John Wesley made his first visit to Staines in 1771 and, by the early 19th century, there was a small congregation of Methodists in the town. The first chapel, opened c. 1845 on Kingston Road, was replaced by a larger building on the same street in 1865. The congregation moved to the current church, on Thames Street, in 1987.

=== Our Lady of the Rosary ===
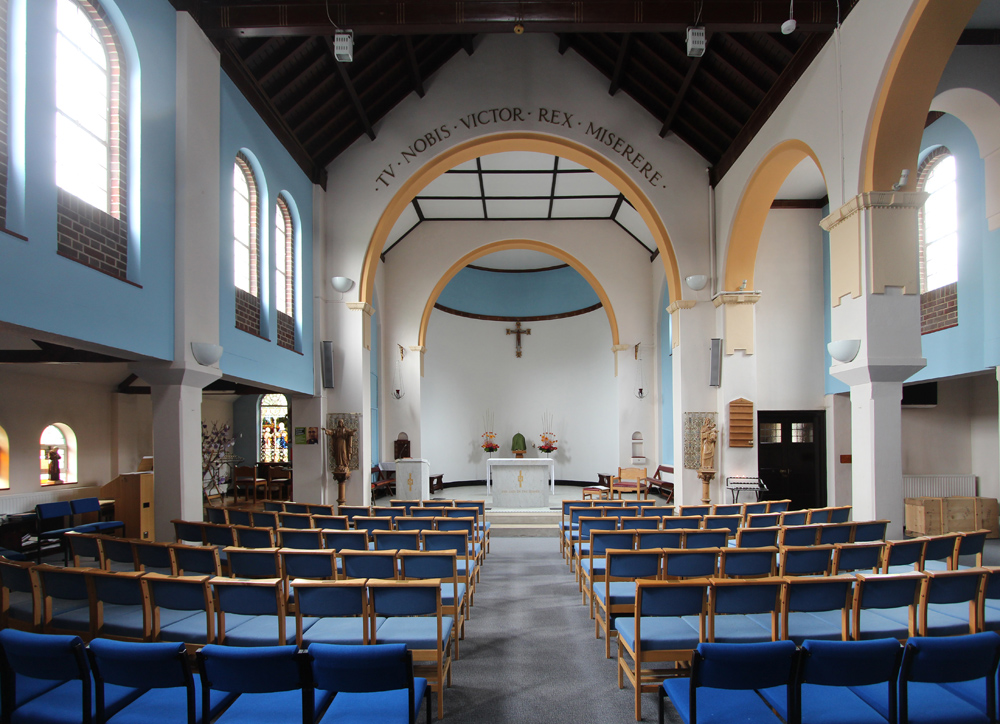
Our Lady of the Rosary, interior

The first Roman Catholic Mass to be celebrated at Staines since the Reformation, took place in 1862 at the workhouse, on the site of the present Ashford Hospital. A chapel was opened in 1890 on Gresham Road and was initially known as "Our Lady, Help of Christians". The current name, "Our Lady of the Rosary" was granted in 1893. The building was extended eastwards to form the present church in 1931, with the addition of a chancel and narrow south aisle. Renovation work in 1990, added additional side aisles and created a new church hall at the west end.

=== Staines Congregational Church ===
There has been a substantial population of Dissenters living in Staines since the mid-17th century and, by 1690, there was a permanent meeting house in the town. The numbers of Congregationalists declined in the mid-18th century, but a regular meeting was re-established in the High Street in 1785. A chapel was constructed in Thames Street in 1802 and was replaced by a classical-style church on the same site in 1837. The present Congregational Church, on Stainash Crescent just off of Kingston Road, opened in May 1956.

== Culture ==
=== Art ===
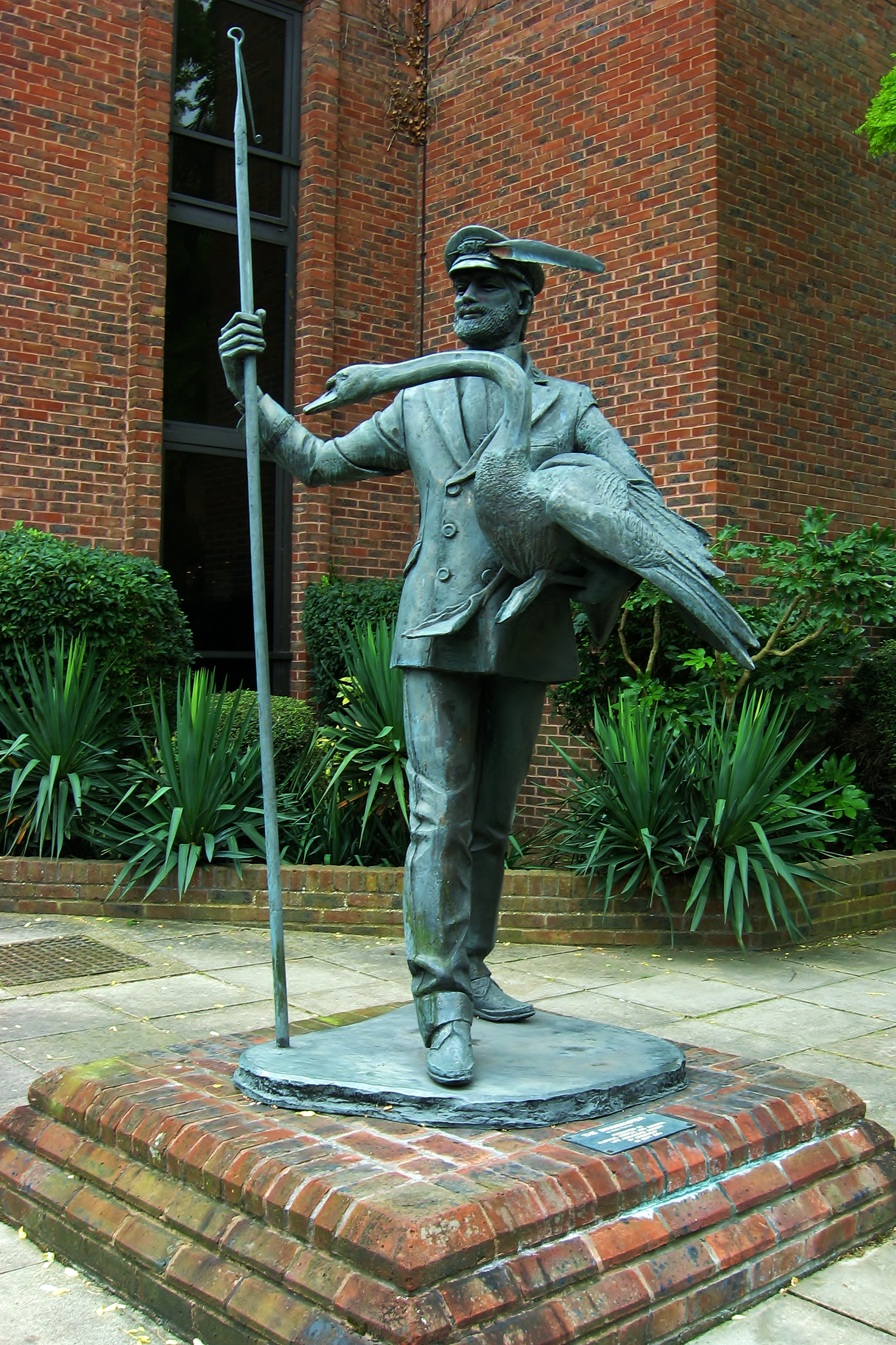
The Swanmaster (1983), by Diana Thomson

Several artists have been inspired to paint Staines Bridge, including William Bernard Cooke (1778–1855) and Arthur Melville (1855–1904). An engraving of the bridge by William Woolnoth (1780–1837), inspired by a painting by John Preston Neale (1780–1847), is held by the Victoria and Albert Museum.

Among the works of public art on display are mosaics by Gary Drostle and sculptures by Terence Clarke that pay homage to the town's history as a former Roman settlement. The Two Rivers shopping centre has two bronze sculptures by David Backhouse: The first, Time Continuum, celebrates the life of Staines through two millennia and the second, Water Sprites, references the life of the waterways that converge nearby. The Swanmaster, by Diana Thomson, commissioned by Spelthorne Borough Council in 1983, was moved to the Memorial Gardens in 2014.

=== Film and television ===
Staines is the hometown of the fictional Ali G, created by the actor and comedian Sacha Baron Cohen. The character, who first appeared on The 11 O'Clock Show on Channel 4 in 1998, has been described as a "disaffected wannabe homeboy of the suburbs" by the television producer, Harry Thompson. Baron Cohen has said that Ali G "believes that he is a black hip-hop artist from Staines. He believes his neighbourhood is a rough ghetto, when in fact it's this lovely, leafy, middle-class suburb outside Windsor, where swans swim under the beautiful bridge." Following the successful spin-off television series Da Ali G Show, the character appeared in the 2002 feature film Ali G Indahouse. In the film, Ali G is a member of a fictional gang, the West Staines Massive, when his hometown is threatened by the expansion of Heathrow Airport. The film concludes with the saving of Staines and the decision to demolish Slough instead.

=== Literature ===
William Shakespeare mentions Staines in Act II Scene 3 of Henry V, when the Hostess asks her husband, who is travelling to Southampton, if she can accompany him as far as the town. Much of chapters 9–11 of Three Men in a Boat (1889) by Jerome K. Jerome is set in the Staines area, as the main characters travel upriver from Kingston-upon-Thames to Oxford. In Chapter 15 of H. G. Wells' novel The War of the Worlds (1897), an artillery unit engages a Martian close to Staines. In John Wyndham's novel The Kraken Wakes (1953), the main characters are stopped in their attempt to reach Cornwall on a dinghy through a flooded England in the "Staines-Weybridge area".

=== Music ===
The indie rock band Hard-Fi was formed in Staines in 2003. Many of the songs from their first album, Stars of CCTV, describe their small-town suburban origins. In 2011, lead singer Richard Archer attracted criticism after describing Staines as a "ghost town".

== Sport ==
=== Leisure Centre ===
Spelthorne Leisure Centre, at Knowle Green, opened in 1990 on the site of the former indoor swimming pool which was constructed in 1967. A new leisure centre, which will provide a 25 m pool, a fitness suite and three artificial football pitches on its roof, is expected to open in 2024.

=== Association football ===
Staines Town F.C. (STFC) traces its origins to a football team from St Peter's Institute, which took part in the 1878–79 FA Cup. STFC itself was founded in 1892 and initially played its home games at Hammond's Farm, now beneath the King George VI reservoir. It later merged with the St Peter's team, but the combined club closed in 1935. STFC was reformed towards the end of the Second World War and played its home games at Wheatsheaf Park. The ground was refurbished in 2004, but in March 2022 the club announced that it was in dispute with its landlord and would be suspending football operations with immediate effect.

Staines Lammas F.C. was founded in 1926 and initially played its home games at the Lammas Recreation Ground. The club moved to Laleham Recreation Ground in the 1980s and, in 2001, opened a new pavilion.

=== Cricket ===
Cricket has been played on Staines Moor since at least 1759 and the nearby Laleham Burway was the site of the first recorded 11-a-side match in Surrey in 1778. Laleham Cricket Club was founded over 200 years ago. It changed its name to the Staines and Laleham Cricket Club in the early 1970s, when it moved from Ashford Road to its current ground, "The Faulkners", on Worple Road.

=== Hockey ===
Staines Hockey Club was formed in 1890 and is one of the oldest hockey clubs in the world. During its early years, the club had several international players among its members, who won gold medals at the 1908 Olympic Games. The club has been based at Worple Road since 1972 and the ground has four full-size hockey pitches. The first ladies' team was formed in 1979 and the first artificial turf pitch was laid in 2001.

=== Archery ===
Laleham Archery Club has been based on Worple Road in Staines since 1971, though the club can trace its history back to 1955. The club has more than 100 archers, shooting the four main archery disciplines of recurve, barebow, compound and longbow. In October each year the club hosts an Albion tournament, where archers from all across the region come and compete, shooting up to 108 arrows each at targets up to 80 yards away.

=== Rugby ===
Staines Rugby Football Club was founded in summer 1926 and played its first game against a team from Windsor at the Lammas Recreation Ground that October. In 1947, the club began to rent pitches at the Laleham Cricket Club ground in Ashford Road. It acquired the land for its current premises, a former gravel pit in Hanworth, in 1962. The ground, known as "The Reeves", opened in September 1964.

=== Rowing ===
Staines Boat Club was formed in 1851 and, in 1909, was one of the founder members of the Remenham Club. The current boathouse, at Egham Hythe, is a temporary structure, built in 1950 after the previous building was destroyed by fire.

=== Staines Stadium ===
Staines Stadium, on Wraysbury Road, was opened in 1928 and was primarily used for greyhound racing. In 1936, a dozen Cheetahs were imported from Kenya and, having served a six-month quarantine, were trained to follow the mechanical hare and to race with the dogs. Stock car racing took place at the venue in the late 1950s. The stadium closed in 1960, when the A30 Staines bypass was constructed through part of the site, and was demolished in 1965.

== Notable buildings and landmarks ==
=== Blue Anchor ===
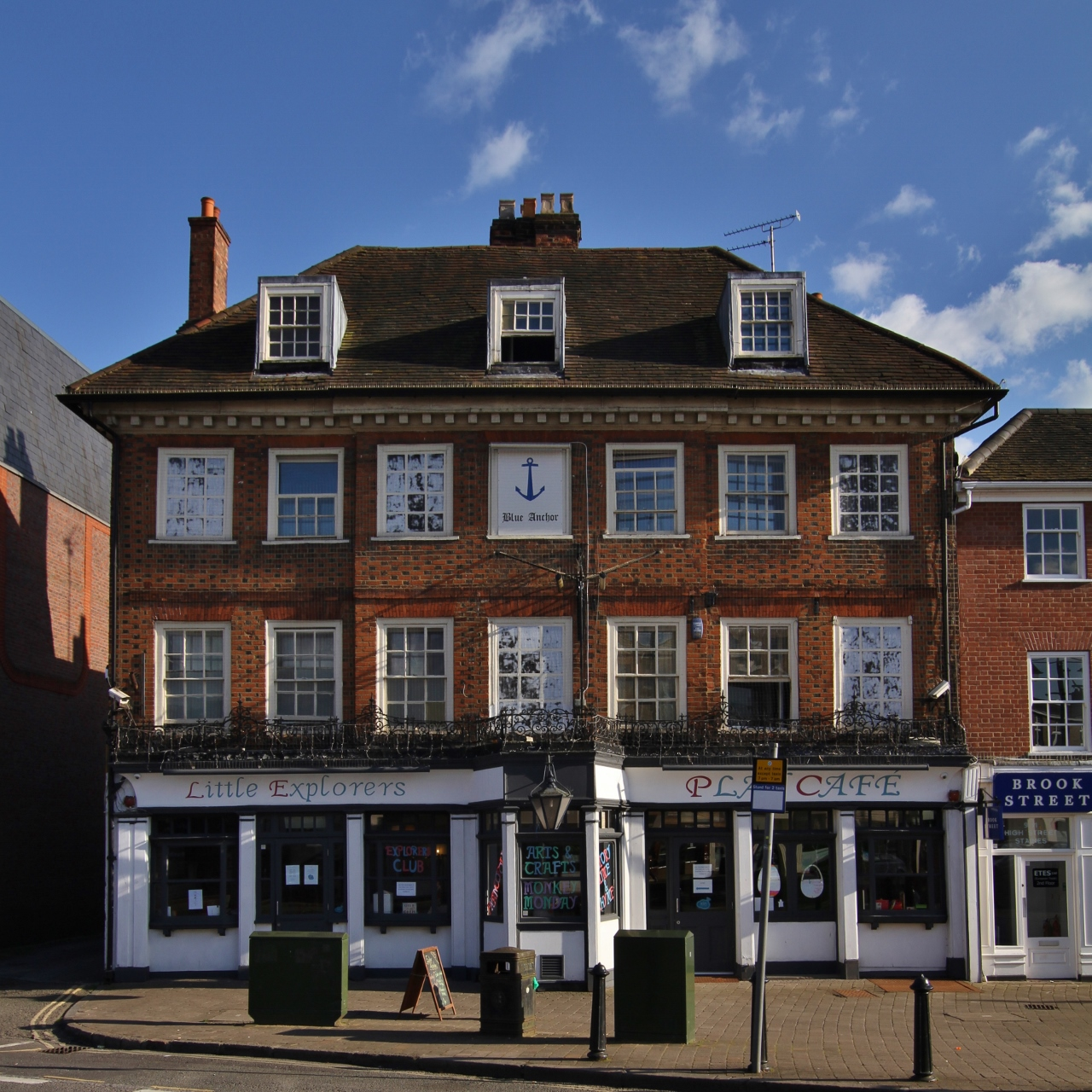
Blue Anchor, Market Square

There is thought to have been an inn on the site of the Blue Anchor since the 16th century. The present building dates from the early- to mid-18th century and is constructed in brick. Much of the interior is thought to be original, including the wooden panelling, several fireplaces and at least one of the staircases. Within a few decades of completion, five of the upstairs windows had been bricked up to reduce window tax liability. During renovation work in 1957, one of the oak beams in the building was dated using dendrochronology and was found to be 650 years old.

=== Coal Tax posts ===
There are three surviving coal-tax posts in the Staines area. These posts marked the limits of the tax jurisdiction of the Corporation of the City of London and were erected under the provisions of the London Coal and Wine Duties Continuance Act 1861. The two posts currently on Wraysbury Road were relocated to their present positions in the second half of the 20th century. The third, a 3 m-high (9.8 ft) cast-iron obelisk, is in Thames Street close to the Thames Lodge Hotel.

=== London Stone ===
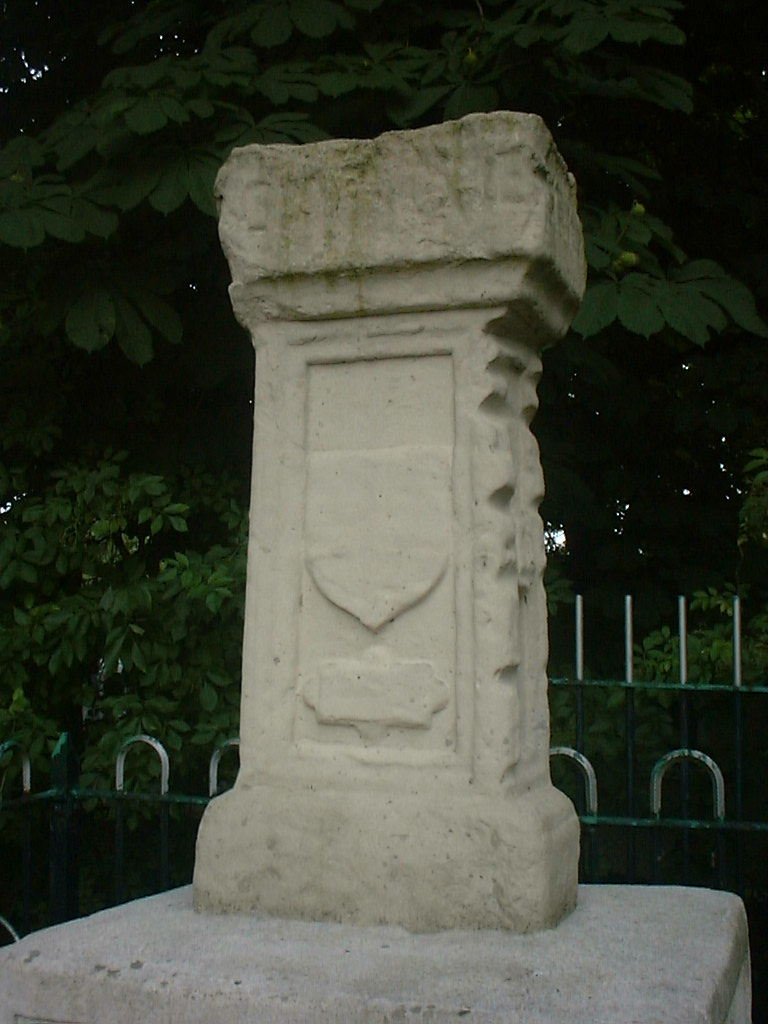
The replica London Stone

The London Stone is a carved stone pillar, positioned beside the River Thames next to the Lammas Recreation Ground. The first stone was erected by the Corporation of the City of London in 1280 or 1285, following its purchase of the river rights from Richard I. Originally positioned close to the Market Square, it marked the western boundary of the corporation's jurisdiction and is thought to have indicated the tidal limit of the Thames in medieval times. It was moved to its current position in the 17th or 18th century and was replaced by a replica in 1986. The original stone is now held by the Spelthorne Museum at Staines Library.

=== Reservoirs ===
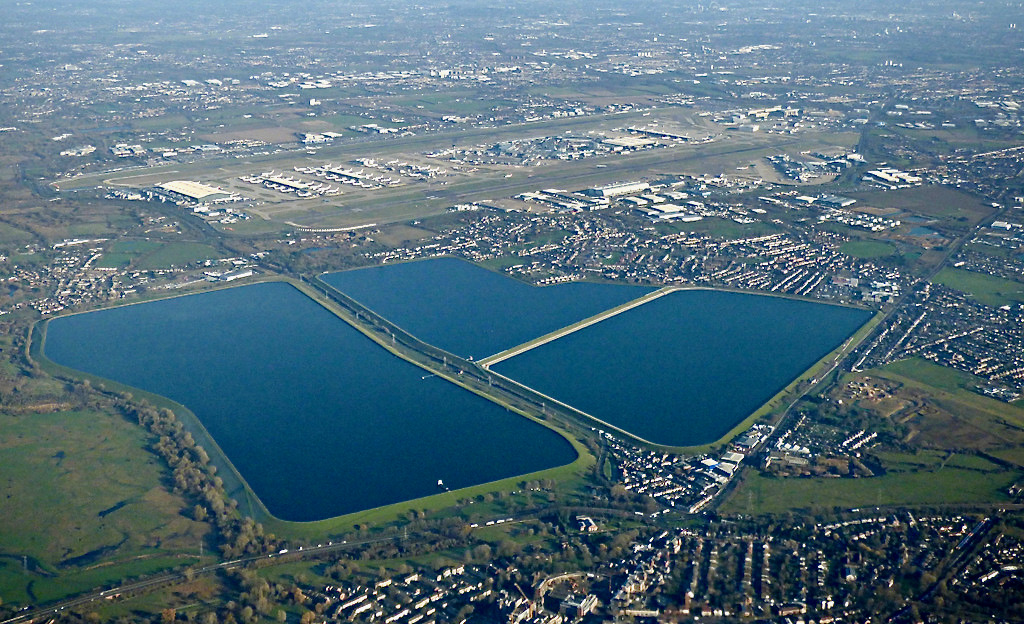
Looking northeast across the King George VI Reservoir (left) and Staines Reservoirs (right) towards Heathrow Airport.

The twin Staines Reservoirs, to the northeast of the town, were completed in 1902 and have a combined capacity of 15 Mm^{3} (3.3×10^{21} imp gal). They are filled from the Staines Reservoirs Aqueduct, which runs from the Thames at Bell Weir Lock, Hythe End. (Note: Severe flooding in Staines in February 2014, was caused in part by the overflowing of the Staines Aqueduct, following a period of heavy rainfall. A short stretch of the channel walls partially collapsed as a result of the high flow rates and the aqueduct was closed throughout the summer of 2014 for repair work.) The two reservoirs are separated by a 1,030 m-long (1,130 yd) embankment and, under normal operating conditions, the water level of the northern reservoir is 3 m (9.8 ft) higher than that of the south. During the Second World War, Staines Reservoirs were used by No. 617 Squadron RAF to practise aiming bouncing bombs in preparation for Operation Chastise.

The King George VI Reservoir was completed in 1939, but was left unfilled for the duration of the Second World War. In 1942, it was used by the Royal Air Force for Fog Investigation and Dispersal Operation experiments. It was finally opened by King George VI in November 1947 and holds 20 Mm^{3} (4.4×10^{21} imp gal).

=== Town Hall ===
The Town Hall, in the Market Square, was designed by John Johnson in the Renaissance style and was completed in 1880. It replaced a medieval market hall, which was closed in 1862. The building is constructed in white brick with stone dressing with a fish-scale slate roof and the clock was manufactured by Gillett & Bland.

The Town Hall was used as the council headquarters until 1976, when Spelthorne Borough council relocated to Knowle Green. In the early 1990s, it was used as an arts centre and, in 2004, it became a wine bar. In January 2018, the building was converted into thirteen residential apartments.

=== War memorial ===
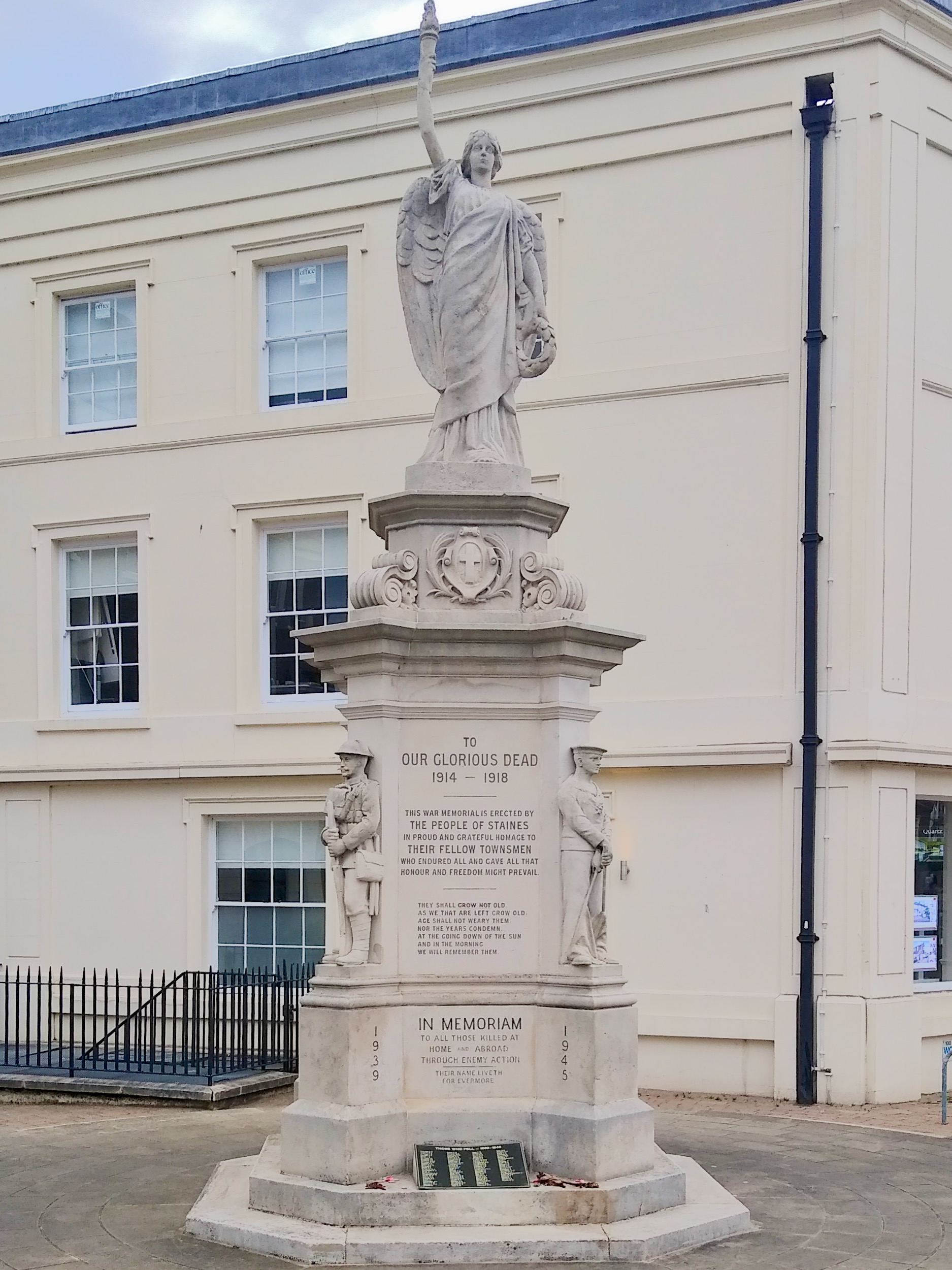
War Memorial, Market Square

Staines War Memorial was designed by E. J. Barrett and was installed in the Memorial Gardens in 1920. It takes the form of a statue of the winged figure of Victory and is constructed in Portland stone. The names of 196 men who died in the First World War are inscribed on the plinth, beneath which is an inclined stone tablet listing those who died in the Second World War. The memorial was moved to the Market Square in 2002.

== Parks and open spaces ==
=== Church Lammas ===
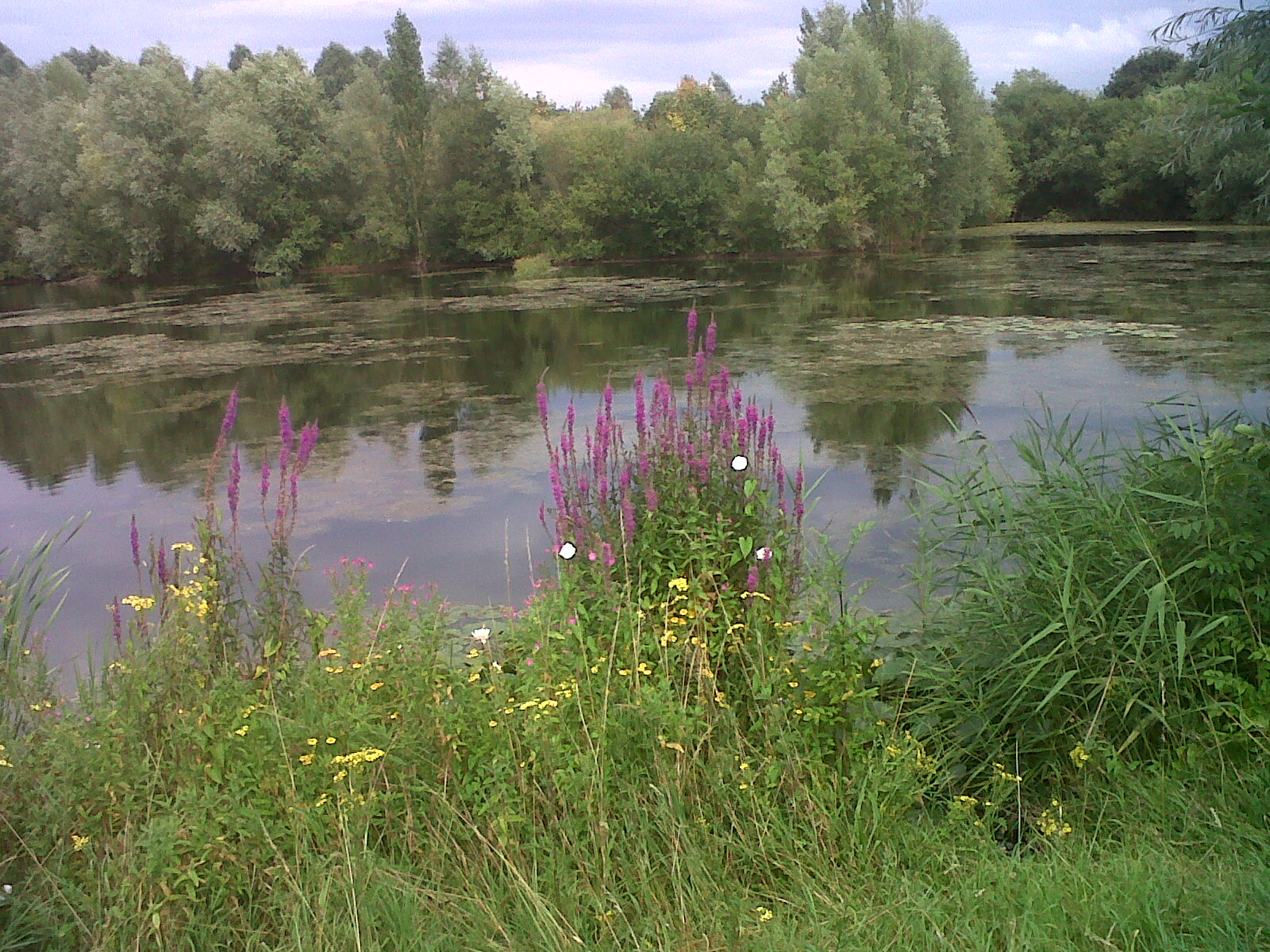
Lake at Church Lammas

The 8.8 ha (22-acre) Church Lammas is an area of common land to the northeast of the town centre, adjacent to the Lammas Recreation Ground. Between 1988 and 1996, it was the site of a quarry and, after gravel and sand extraction had ceased, the area was landscaped to create a recreational area with three lakes. In 2005, the former quarry operator was awarded the Cooper-Heyman Cup in recognition of its work to ensure that the park is fully accessible to disabled visitors.

=== Lammas Recreation Ground ===
The 15-acre (6.1 ha) Lammas lands were granted to the town by John Ashby in 1922. The area opened to the public as a recreation ground in September of the same year. Since it had previously been common land, residents received compensation for the removal of their grazing rights. (Note: In April 2022, Spelthorne Borough Council installed outdoor gym equipment at Lammas Park and Staines Park.)

=== Market Square and Memorial Gardens ===
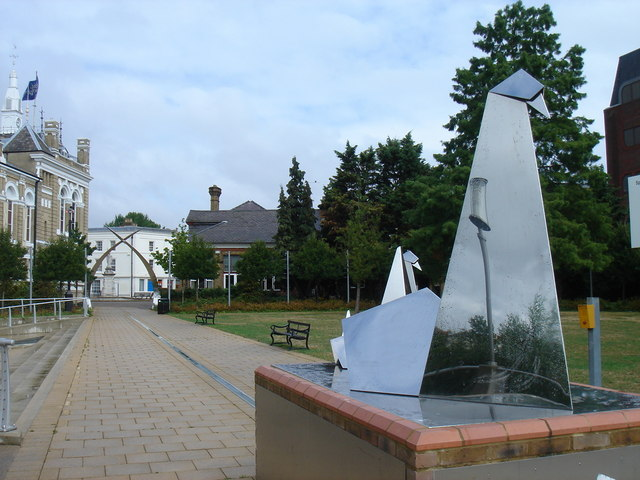
View towards one of the "Swan Arches" from the Memorial Gardens, with the Town Hall on the far left

The Memorial Gardens, alongside the River Thames, were first opened in 1897 as the "Town Gardens". They acquired their current name after the First World War when the town war memorial was erected beside the river. In 2002, the Market Square was refurbished and new gateways, known as the "Swan Arches", were installed at the main access points to the Memorial Gardens.

=== Staines Moor ===
The 511 ha (1,260-acre) Staines Moor, north of the town and east of the M25 motorway, is the largest area of common land in Staines. Until the Commons Registration Act 1965 came into force, any homeowner, whose chimney smoke could be seen from St Mary's Church, was entitled to graze their animals on the moor between April and December each year.

Staines Moor is the largest area of alluvial meadow in Surrey and was designated a Site of Special Scientific Interest in 1984. Several rare plants are found on the moor such as brown sedge, small water pepper and upright chickweed. The area also provides a habitat for invertebrates including bees, butterflies and moths. Some 217 species of mollusc and 190 species of bird have also been recorded.

=== Staines Park ===
Staines Park at Knowle Green, to the east of the town centre, is a 4.7 ha (12-acre) recreation ground with tennis courts, a bowling green and a children's playground. Since 2019, the park has been legally protected by the charity, Fields in Trust.

== Notable residents ==
- All Alone, important war pigeon
- Charles Wellington Furse (1868–1904) portrait and figure painter – born in Staines.
- Geoffrey Molyneux Palmer (1882–1957) composer – born in Staines.
- Norman Hunter (1899–1995) children's author – lived on a houseboat in Staines following his retirement.
- Danny Blanchflower (1926–1993) captain of Tottenham Hotspur F.C. – died in Staines.
- B. H. Barry (b. 1940) fight director – born in Staines.
- Steve Holley (b. 1953) musician – lived in Staines.
- Bobby Davro (b. 1958) comedian – lived in Staines.
- Nina Wadia (b. 1968) actress – lived in Staines.
- Jon Tickle (b. 1974) television personality – lived and worked in Staines.
- Dan Jones (b. 1981) historian, author, TV presenter, and journalist – lives in Staines.

== Bibliography ==
- Adamson, John (2011). Staines Preparatory School. Staines-upon-Thames: Staines Preparatory School. ISBN 978-0-95-701000-0.
- Anonymous (2004). Staines : An illustrated miscellany. Salisbury: Francis Frith. ISBN 978-1-84-567001-6.
- Baldwin, Peter; Baldwin, Robert; Evans, Dewi Ieuan (2007). The motorway achievement: Building the network in southern and eastern England. Chichester: Phillimore. ISBN 978-1-86-077446-1.
- Bird, J.; Hassall, M.; Sheldon, H., eds. (1996). Interpreting Roman London: Papers in Memory of Hugh Chapman. Oxford: Oxbow Books. ISBN 978-1-90-018802-9.
- Booker, M.J.; Panter, B.F. (1981). Staines: A Shopping Study 1979-1980. Kingston-upon-Thames: Surrey County Council.
- Camden, William (1695). Gibson, Edmund (ed.). Britannia. London: F. Collins.
- Clarke, Edward (1918). The story of my life. London: J. Murray.
- Cotton, Jonathan; Crocker, Glenys; Graham, Audrey, eds. (2004). Aspects of archaeology and history in Surrey. Guildford: Surrey Archaeological Society. ISBN 978-0-95-414603-0.
- Cotton, Jonathan; Field, David, eds. (2004). Towards a new Stone Age : Aspects of the Neolithic in south-east England (PDF). York: Council for British Archaeology. ISBN 978-1-90-277139-7.
- Crocker, Glenys (1999). Surrey's Industrial Past. Guildford: Surrey Industrial History Group. ISBN 978-0-95-239188-3.
- Dix, Barry; Nunn, Jim, eds. (1987). The Spelthorne Book. Staines: The Spelthorne Adult Education Institute. ISBN 0-95-126960-7.
- Goble, R.A. (2016). Staines-upon-Thames.
- Gover, J.E.B; Mawer, A.; Stenton, F.M. (1942). The place names of Middlesex. Cambridge: Cambridge University Press.
- Greatorex, Irene (2000). Houses of God : a survey and history of places of worship in Spelthorne. Staines-upon-Thames: Spelthorne Museum. ISBN 978-0-95-302651-7.
- Jackson, Hazelle (2002). Staines with Egham and Laleham : A photographic history of your town. Black Horse Books.
- Jerome, Jerome K. (1889). Three Men in a Boat. London: Simpkin, Marshall and Co. Archived from the original on 17 May 2022.
- Jones, Phil (2010). The Roman and Medieval town of Staines. Woking: Spoilheap Publications. ISBN 978-0-95-588461-0.
- Kümin, Beat A (1996). The shaping of a community : the rise and reformation of the English parish, c. 1400-1560. Aldershot: Scholar. ISBN 978-1-85-928164-2.
- Long, David (2013). Animal heroes. London: Arrow Books. ISBN 978-0-09-957434-7.
- Mansfield, J.A. (1991). Staines in the records: From Medieval to Modern Times Part I. Staines: J.A. Mansfield.
- Mansfield, J.A. (1992). Staines in the records: From Medieval to Modern Times Part II. Staines: J.A. Mansfield.
- Marshall, C.F.D. (1963). History of the Southern Railway (2nd ed.). London: Ian Allan.
- Maryfield, Pamela (2006). Staines : A history. Chichester: Phillimore. ISBN 978-1-86-077420-1.
- Mortimer, Richard, ed. (2009). Edward the Confessor : The man and the legend. Rochester, NY: The Boydell Press. ISBN 978-1-84-383436-6.
- Mills, A.D. (2003). Oxford Dictionary of British Place Names. Oxford: Oxford University Press. ISBN 978-0-19-852758-9.
- Mills, John (1993). A guide to the industrial history of Spelthorne. Guildford: Surrey Industrial History Group. ISBN 978-0-95-096976-3.
- Mitchell, Vic; Smith, Keith (1989). Branch lines around Ascot : from Ash Vale, Weybridge, Staines and Wokingham. Midhurst: Middleton. ISBN 978-0-90-652064-2.
- Ramsden, P.J. (1988). The Fire Service History of Staines and Ashford, Middlesex. Doncaster: Aspen Books. ISBN 978-0-95-108331-4.
- Reynolds, Susan, ed. (1962). A History of the County of Middlesex: Volume 3, Shepperton, Staines, Stanwell, Sunbury, Teddington, Heston and Isleworth, Twickenham, Cowley, Cranford, West Drayton, Greenford, Hanwell, Harefield and Harlington. London: Victoria County History. Archived from the original on 8 January 2022.
- Stenton, F.M. (1971). Anglo-Saxon England (3rd ed.). Oxford: Oxford University Press. ISBN 978-0-19-821716-9.
- Thacker, Fred S. (1914). The Thames Highway. Vol. I: General History. London: Dyer's Buildings.
- Thacker, Fred S. (1920). The Thames Highway. Vol. II: Locks and Weirs. London: Dyer's Buildings.
- Tracy, Kathleen (2008). Sacha Baron Cohen: The unauthorised biography. London: JR Books. ISBN 978-1-90-621746-4.
- Wells, H.G. (1898). War of the Worlds. New York and London: Harper & Brothers. Archived from the original on 18 July 2021.
- White, H.; Boydell, B., eds. (2013). The Encyclopaedia of Music in Ireland. Dublin: University College Dublin Press. ISBN 978-1-90-635978-2.
- Williams, Geoffrey (1997). Flying Through Fire : FIDO - the fogbuster of World War Two. Stroud: Sutton. ISBN 978-0-75-090881-8.
- Wyndham, John (2008) [1953]. The Kraken Wakes. London: Penguin. ISBN 978-0-14-103299-3.
