= The School House, Staines-upon-Thames, UK =

Coordinates: 51.4353°N 0.5144°W

The School House in Staines-upon-Thames is a surviving example of an early 19th-century one room school in the UK and was part of Miss Margaret Pope's efforts supporting the Quaker principle of bringing education to all (including those excluded from Church of England schools) which, in the early 19th Century was progressed by both men and women.

== Location ==
The School House is located at 20 Hale Street in Staines-upon-Thames in the north of the county of Surrey and is within the Staines Conservation area. It is the centre of five buildings on Hale Street between the Wraysbury River and the River Colne.

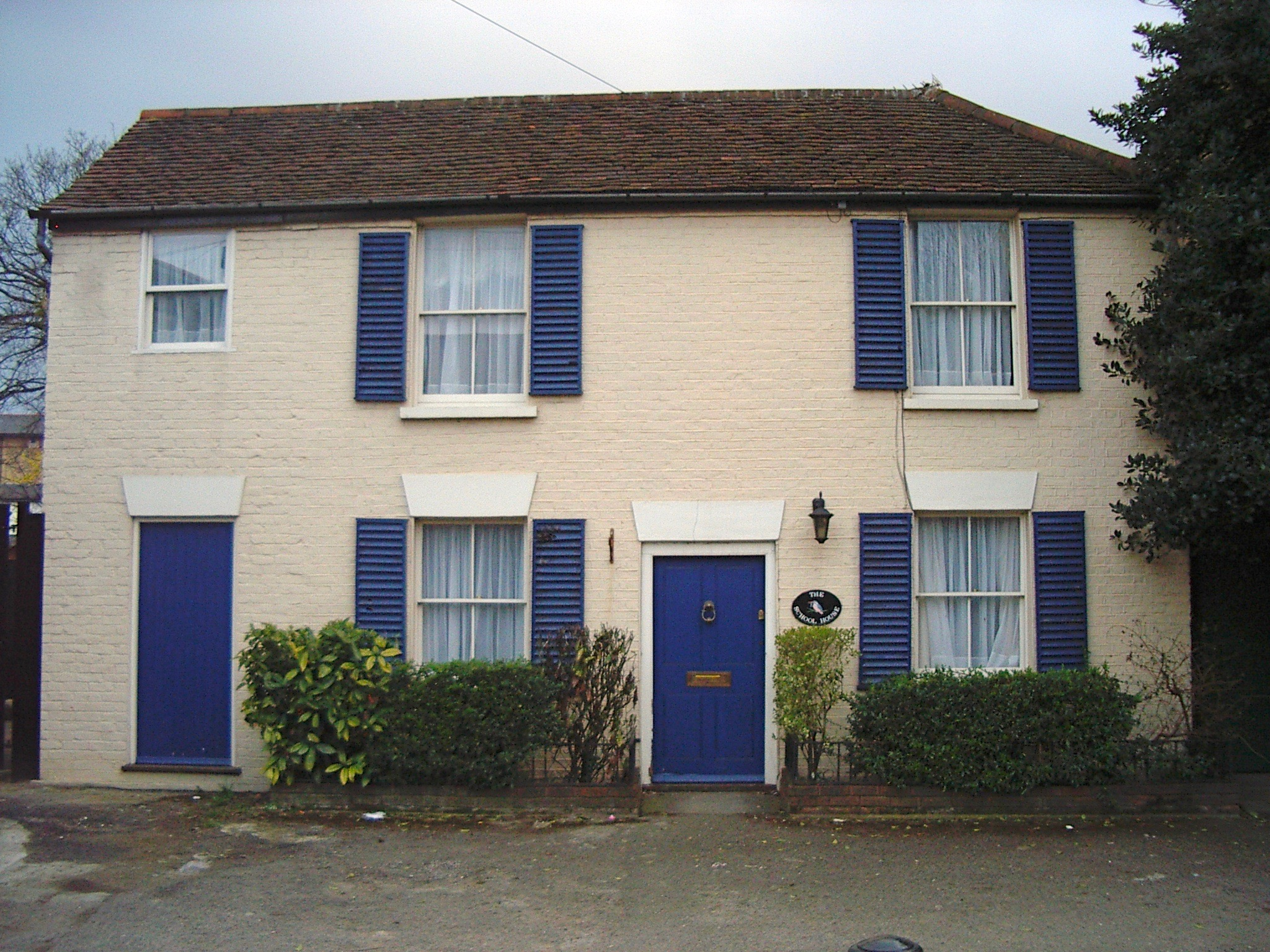
Front View post 1980s left side extension

== History and role in education in 19th-century ==
The house was purpose built early 1800s as a one-room school and the starting point of Miss Margaret Pope's contribution to bringing education to all. There was a school for boys in the ‘Mission Hall’ (16 Hale Street) and references to a school for girls built near by in 1831. One room schools were common place in UK, Europe and the US in the early to mid 19th century with the increase in education for children. While many remain in the US it is unclear how many remain, with the school room in place, in the UK. Some one room schools were just a single room, but others, like The School House were built with limited accommodation for a teacher. The 1861 England census lists Miss Pope's School at 20 Hale Street.

In 1874, the schools in Hale Street moved to a building behind the then Congregational Church in Thames Street. This was as a result of a School Building Grant Application for Miss Pope's school It is at this time, when the school had outgrown The School House it is assumed that the building became residential.

Miss Margaret Pope was a key figure in progressing education in the 19th century. She was the daughter of Dr Robert Pope, physician and surgeon to King George III and his daughter Princess Amelia. Dr. and Miss Pope both lived in Staines-upon-Thames. The Popes were Quakers and schools at that time were Church of England so many, including Quaker children were excluded. Margaret Pope was a driving force progressing the Quaker principal of education for all in the area with schools being named after her. The School House was the location of the start of her expansion of making education widely available to all and the growth and success of this initiative resulted in her bringing three schools together for the education of all.

Margaret Pope's Educational Charity still exists as registered charity 311907.

== Construction and style ==
The house in its original form had an entrance hall, and small room at the front. From the hall there were stairs to the first floor that consisted of two rooms. These doorways are low in height. This layout is largely unchanged today with the school room which would have had with rows of desks and a teacher's desk at one end by the fireplace still as an open plan space.

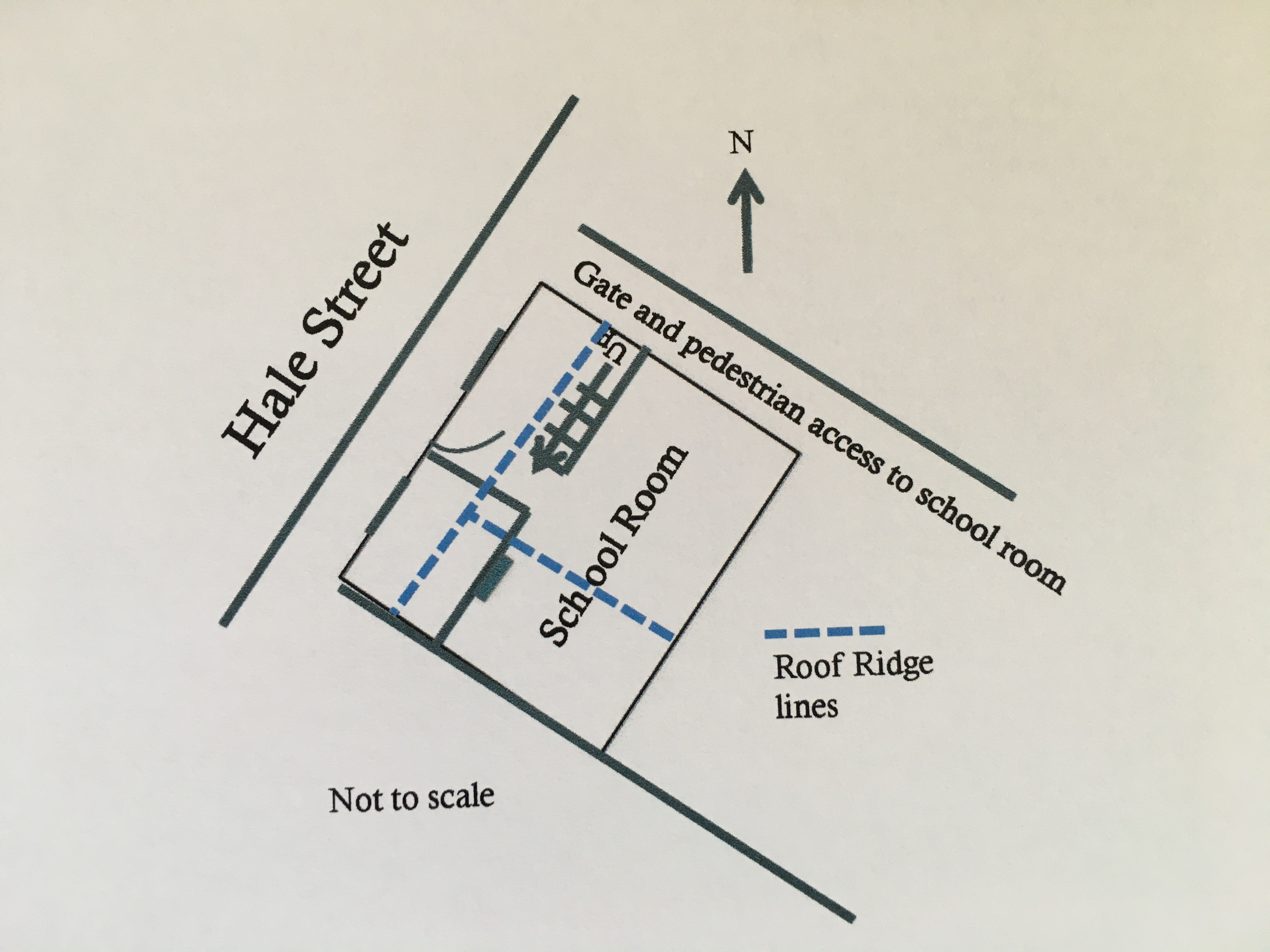
Original ground floor layout showing roof ridge lines

The front of the house has a pitched roof with the ridge parallel to the front of the house (approximately northeast – southwest). Roof ridge lines are in blue dashes in the layout diagram. The former school room is behind the front rooms and takes the entire width and height of the building, with a second roof ridge being almost the same height as the ridge of the roof over the front rooms, but is perpendicular to the front ridge, therefore approximately north west – south east. The ridge for the roof of the school room is located approximate one third along the width of the building, closest to the southern end of the school room. This means the school room has a very high ceiling (two storeys plus attic at the ridge point). Within the vaulted ceiling the wooden roof joists and trusses become a feature of the room. From the ridge the ceiling followed the roof line downwards until it met the external walls, at a height of approximately four metres (13 ft) on one side and two metres (6 ft 7 in) at the rear of the school room (north side of the building). This gave the rear of the building an asymmetric gable end view.

The house is built of brick with wooden sash windows and clay tiled roof. The front windows and doors have large slightly protruding white painted stone lintels. These are visible as painted white against the brick in aerial photographs from 1920s and 30s, as an example Britain from Above photo ref. EPW061665 or Photo ref. EPW061671 where The School House has been tagged. In 1980s the brickwork was painted cream, the lintels remained white, and dark blue shutters were added to the front windows.

== Extension ==
In 1982, André Goulancourt was granted planning permission to add an upstairs master bedroom, bathroom and downstairs a utility room, cloakroom and extend the kitchen. The planning application contains details of the internal structure and layout of the house both before and after this extension.

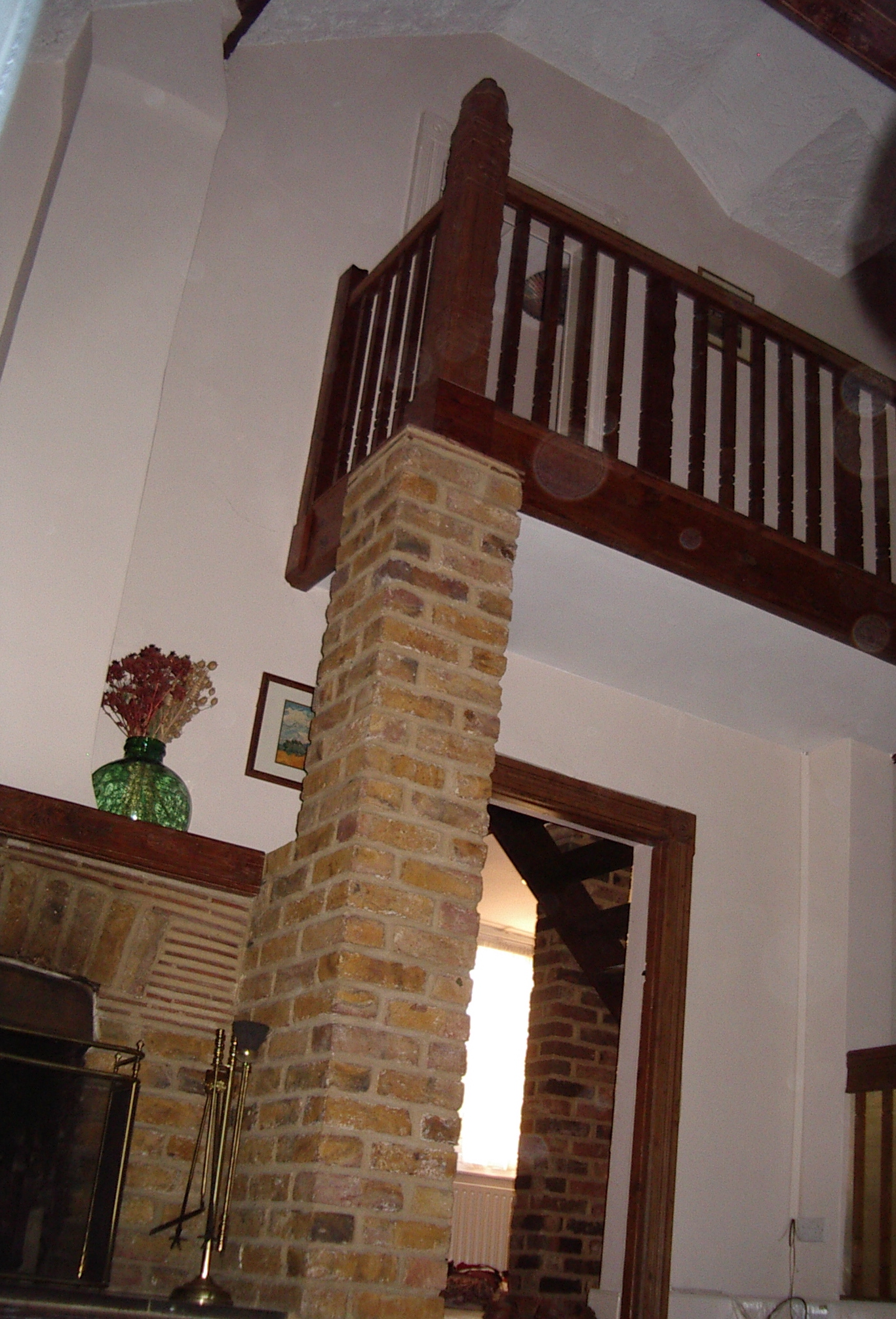
Gallery from the former school room

André Goulancourt is an architectural photographer and co-author of The English House. with Gavin Stamp. The extension involved adding to the left side of the house to enclose the side pedestrian access and an external door was created to preserve the appearance of a side access. The front roof was extended and changed from a hipped roof to a gable end. This gave room for the new upstairs bathroom. One of the Informatives to the Applicant that formed part of the planning permission decision notice was that the county archaeologist would like to visit the site once excavations had started. In the late 1990s the area at the north end of Hale Street was redeveloped and a five year archaeological study undertaken which discovered significant Roman artefacts.

To access the new master bedroom and upstairs bathroom a doorway was added at the top on the stairs at the high point of the vaulted ceiling of the former school room. A gallery at that level in the school room was created to walk through to the new rooms on that level. It is unsubstantiated but it is believed that the carved newel post forming the corner of the gallery was from a deconsecrated church in neighbouring Ashford. The former school room is the main living and dining area in the property.
