= Shepperton Lock =

Lock on the River Thames in Surrey, England

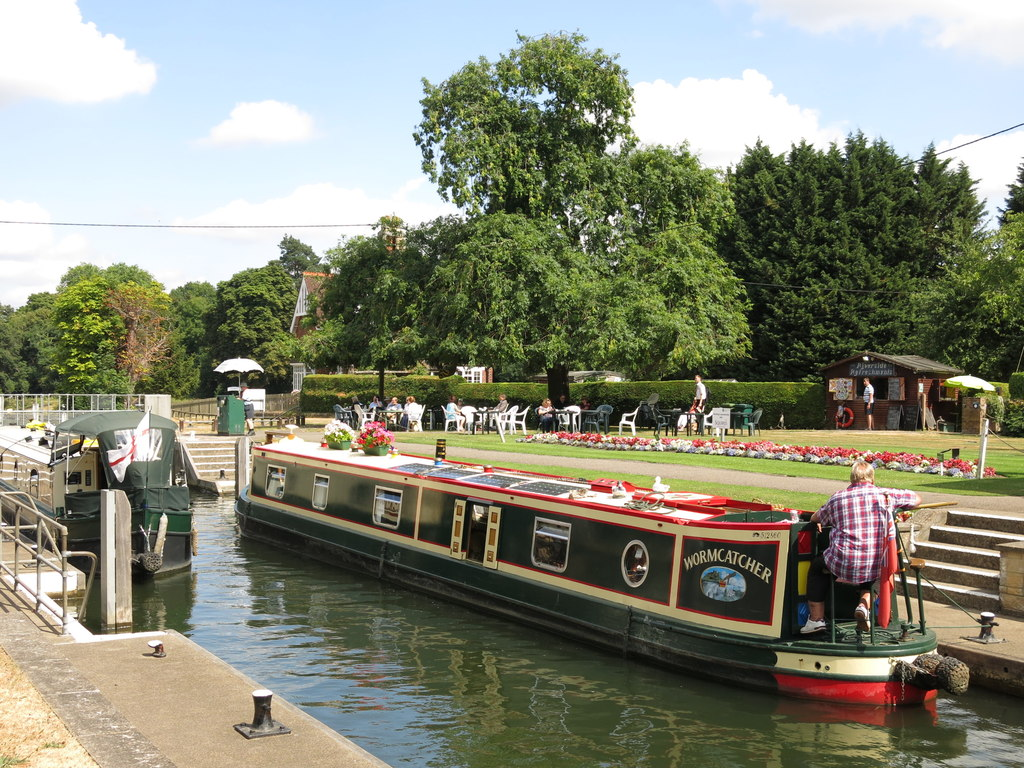
- Shepperton lock (2018)
- Interactive map of Shepperton Lock
- 51°22′55.5″N 00°27′31″W
- Waterway: River Thames
- County: Surrey
- Maintained by: Environment Agency
- Operation: Hydraulic
- First built: 1813
- Latest built: 1899
- Length: 53.16 m (174 ft 5 in)
- Width: 6.04 m (19 ft 10 in)
- Fall: 2.03 m (6 ft 8 in)
- Above sea level: 33 ft (10 m)
- Distance to Teddington Lock: 10 miles
- Power is available out of hours

Shepperton Lock is a lock on the River Thames, in England by the left bank at Shepperton, Surrey. (Note: before 1965 in Middlesex) It is across the river from Weybridge which is nearby linked by a passenger ferry.

In 1813, the City of London Corporation built the pound lock and the short cuts (cuttings) – the nearer expanded an existing meander cutoff, beyond which lies a fresh cutting and old main stream of the river. These each have associated weirs. Shepperton Weir is between Shepperton Lock Island and Hamhaugh Island; and Shepperton Upper Weir is between Hamhaugh Island and the Hamm Court area of Addlestone, Surrey on the opposite bank.

Upstream of the lock island is the Thames Court pub/restaurant on the near bank, downstream of Pharaoh's Island which was given to Lord Nelson after the Battle of the Nile in 1798. The lock is the fifth from the estuary of the river of a total of forty-five.

== History ==
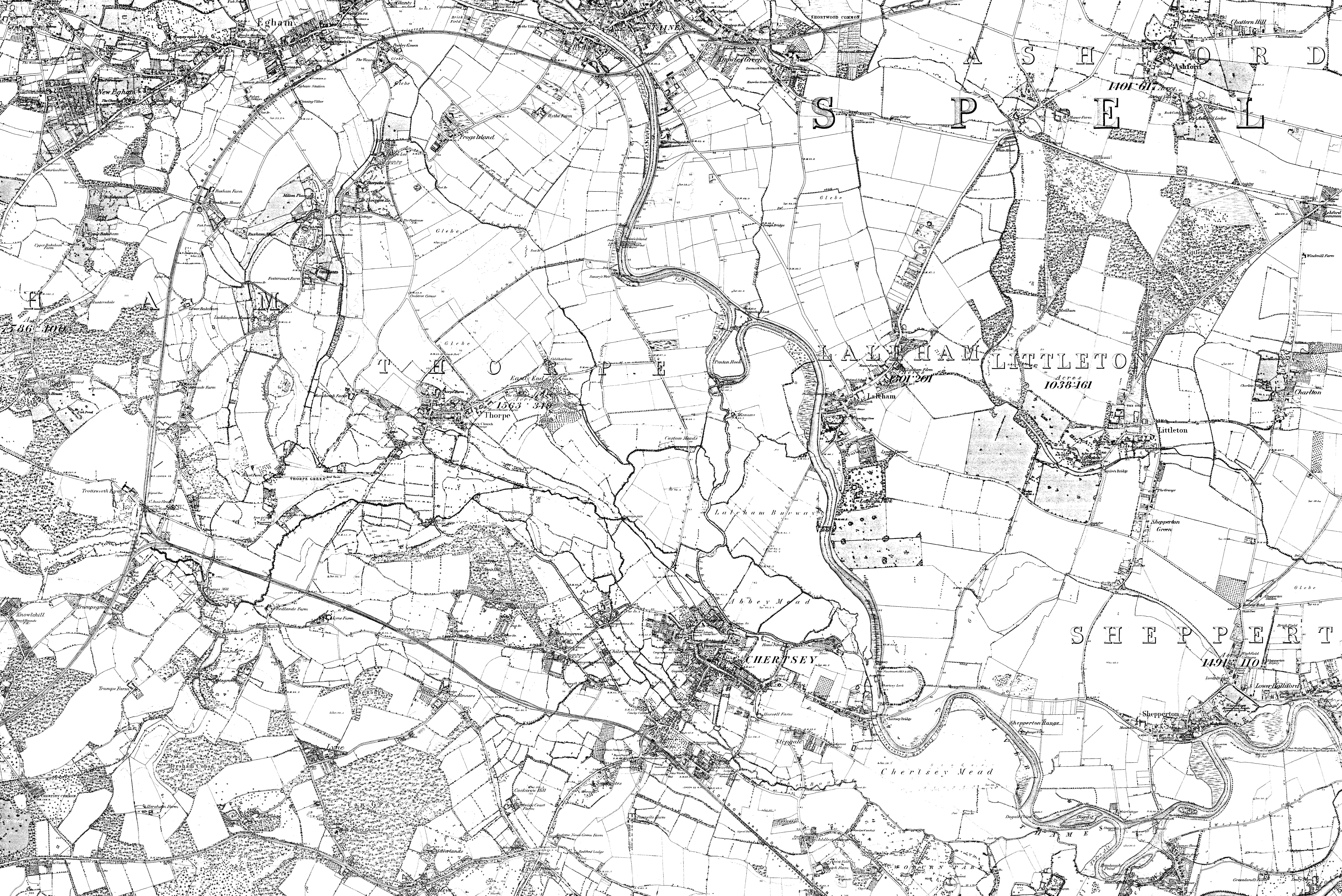
Extract from Map, Ordnance Survey, 1868-1883: The red arrow indicates the position of Shepperton Lock.

A weir is recorded at Shepperton in the 1086 Domesday Book and in the 14th century. A reference to a sluice or dam at Shepperton occurs in 1293 and tolls being raised on passing barges which would imply a flash lock.

The lock was built in 1813 on the site of a small watercourse known as Stoner's Gut which ran across the meander cutoff. Stoner's Gut had posed difficulties to navigation and barges usually went to Weybridge including from the 17th century up the Wey and Godalming Navigations to the south. Various accounts at the end of the 18th century record flood waters using the gut and of a chapel built on piles over the river which was washed away. An alike event in one account washed away much of the main church of the town downstream by the river, prompting its being largely rebuilt in 1614. The gut was for a time dammed. In 1805 came the first suggestion for a lock. After strong opposition, the proposal was put forward again in 1809 and a wooden lock was subsequently built. A stone lock was built in 1899, next to the existing wooden one which was then filled in and removed.

A small island upstream of the lock, was called Dog Ait at some point. This became corrupted into "Dockett" as in Dockett Eddy Lane. Dog Ait is shown on 19th century Ordnance Survey maps (1883, 1896) as being the previous name for Pharaoh's Island.

== Access to the lock ==
The lock is on the left bank, and can be reached from a lane with two entrances having a name for its two halves, the eastern from Old Shepperton has a walkway, the lane adjoins the towpath (Thames Path). More than two parking areas exist. From the Weybridge side the lock can be reached by the ferry.

== Reach above the lock ==
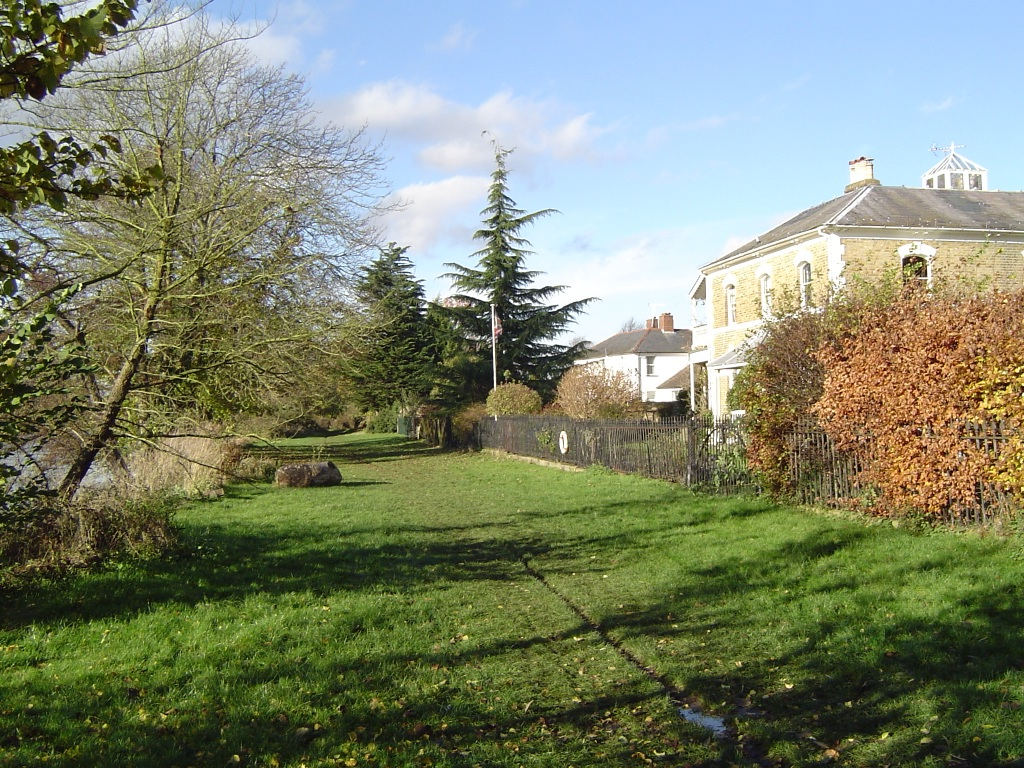
Houses along the river above the lock

Immediately above the lock is Pharaoh's Island, a gift from the nation to Admiral Nelson following the Battle of the Nile. It did not gain its name until the early 20th century. The left bank is more open and has riverside houses until Dumsey Meadow a Site of Special Scientific Interest. The right bank is built up at the edge of Chertsey itself, has a water meadows public park at Chertsey Meads with playground and a low-rise residential estate close to the lock, the Hamm Court area of Addlestone, Surrey.

Chertsey Bridge crosses the river 210 metres below Chertsey Lock. The right bank weir pool at the top of the reach becomes the Abbey River, nearly adjoining the site of the Anglo-Saxon Chertsey Abbey. Chertsey Regatta in skiffing is held alongside Dumsey Meadow in August.

== Sports and businesses ==
The opposite bank is close to two rowing clubs and a large canoeing and kayaking club. Weybridge Ait has a recreational rowing club, Weyfarers R.C. The Environment Agency has a control centre and boats on the Lock Island. A nautical shop and boat repair business is on the near side.

=== Thames Path ===
The Thames Path changes to the left, northern ("Middlesex") (Note: The historic county description is primarily used in rowing races.) bank to Chertsey Lock and passes through the sharp meander Dumsey Meadow, a site of Special Scientific Interest.

== Literature and the media ==
The lock in Charles Dickens Our Mutual Friend at Plashwater Mill is based on Shepperton lock.

In H. G. Wells The War of the Worlds one of the main battles fought against the invaders from Mars takes place between Weybridge and Shepperton lock.

The 1987 John Boorman film Hope and Glory was filmed at Shepperton lock.

== See also ==
- Locks on the River Thames
- Rowing on the River Thames
- "Shepperton Lock". The River Thames Guide.

| Next lock upstream | River Thames | Next lock downstream |
| Chertsey Lock; 3.32 km (2.06 mi) | Shepperton Lock; Grid reference: TQ0725465964 | Sunbury Lock; 4.75 km (2.95 mi) |
