= Chertsey Lock =

Lock on the River Thames in Surrey, England

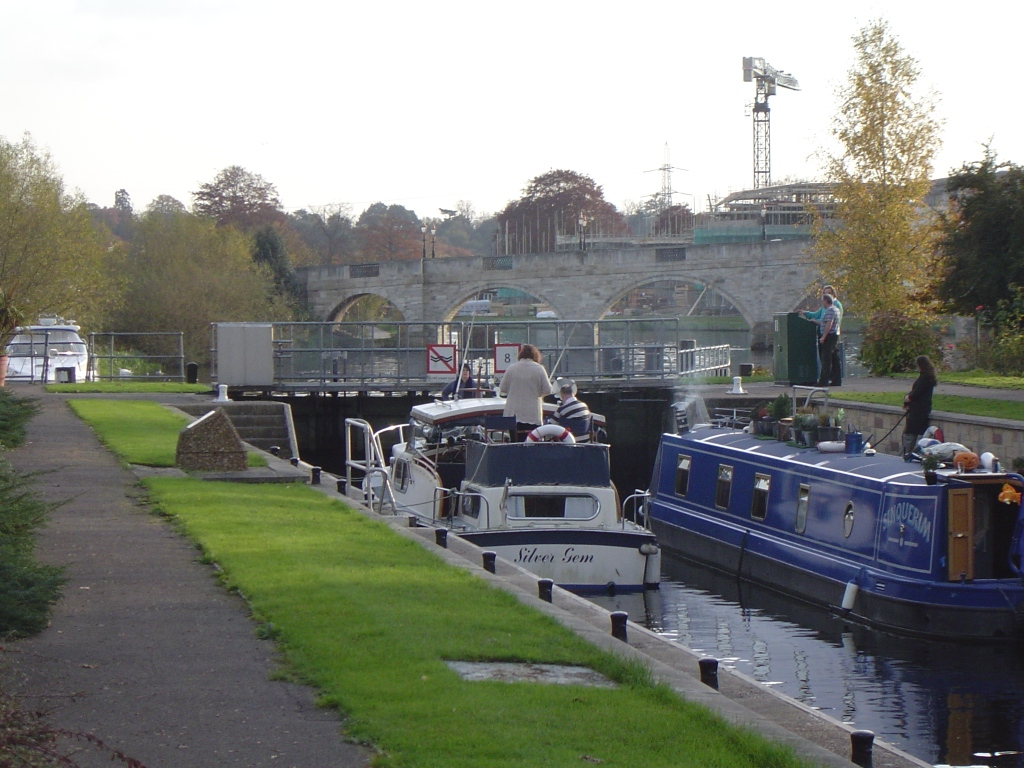
- Chertsey lock with Chertsey Bridge beyond
- 51°23′27″N 0°29′10″W
- Waterway: River Thames
- County: Surrey
- Maintained by: Environment Agency
- Operation: Hydraulic
- First built: 1813
- Latest built: 1913
- Length: 61.16 m (200 ft 8 in)
- Width: 6.40 m (21 ft 0 in)
- Fall: 1.22 m (4 ft 0 in)
- Above sea level: 37 feet (11 m)
- Distance to Teddington Lock: 13 miles (21 km)
- Power is available out of hours

Chertsey Lock is a lock on the River Thames in England, against the left bank, an area of Green Belt including Laleham Park, the largest public park in Spelthorne. It faces the town of Chertsey and is the fifth-lowest of the forty-four locks along the non-tidal course of the river. Owing to a course alteration both banks at the site of the lock have been since medieval times in Surrey. Stone-built Chertsey Bridge built in 1785 is 210 m south (downstream) of the lock. The lock was built by the City of London Corporation in 1813, lengthened in 1893 and again in 1913.

The lock adjoins a small thin island created in its building accessible by boat that connects Chertsey Weir.

== History ==
Upstream lay shallows known to ground boats, Laleham Gulls; to resolve this, proposals including the building up of banks, a weir and lock were made. The land was surveyed for a lock in 1793, producing a bill which was disallowed by Parliament. An 1805 proposal followed for a cut along the length of Laleham, with a pound lock at the lower end; it was resisted by local landowners. A proposal was authorised by Parliament in 1810 a short way upstream which Lord Lucan, owner of the manor of Laleham, asked to have modified to be out of view of his home which he expended monies in building and redesigning, hosting in the same era the temporarily ousted Portuguese monarch, Laleham Manor House (later apartments in a listed building). The Thames Navigation Act 1812 (52 Geo. 3 c. xlvi) authorised the downstream site where building was implemented.

The lock was opened in 1813 and the lock-house on the left bank completed. The lock was lengthened in 1893 and again in 1913. The lock was built with two compartments. The central gates have since been removed. Parochially the low-lying left bank is an exclave of the town of Chertsey reflecting a former sharp bend of the river which ate into the rest of the bank above Dumsey Meadow, since 1974 administered by Spelthorne Borough Council combined with Surrey County Council.

== Access and amenities ==
The lock is accessible via the left (towpath) bank which adjoins humped Thames Side, a road, downstream are eating and drinking establishments with hotel facilities, the Kingfisher and the Boathouse on opposite banks close to Chertsey Bridge.

== Reach above the lock ==
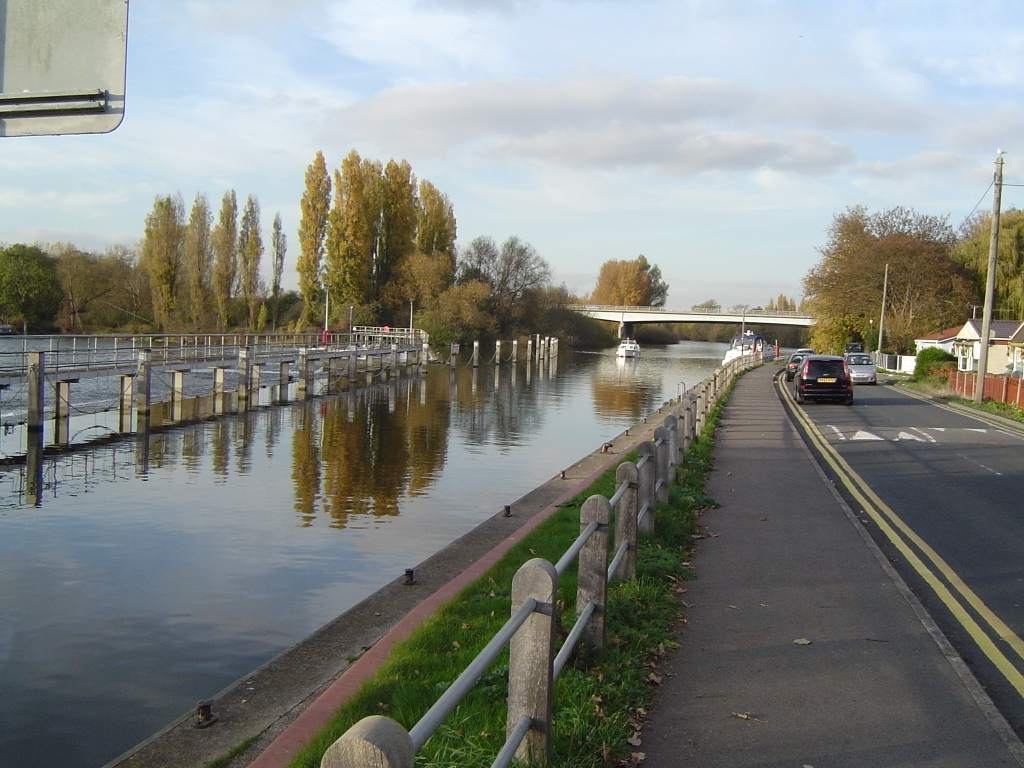
Chertsey Weir with the M3 Motorway Bridge

Right Bank

Below Penton Hook Marina at the top of the reach adjoining houses and small boatyards is the offtake of the Abbey River enclosing Laleham Burway, Chertsey a very large island on the right bank which rejoins the Thames below Chertsey Lock; has housing in the north then areas of reeds and nettles; inland are a small reservoir and groundwater water works.

Left

The left bank across and near Penton Hook Island is part of the clustered village of Laleham until Penton Hook Lock — a line of riverside houses with gardens. This is followed by Burway and Sir William Perkins School Rowing Clubs. From inland a humped road follows the river and Laleham Park to Chertsey Lock. In rowing, Burway Junior Regatta and Burway Head are annual races. An inlet along the upper left bank feeds around 200 million imperial gallons (910,000 m^{3}) per day of water into the Queen Mary Reservoir. Downstream the river is crossed by a bridge carrying the M3 motorway.

=== Thames Path ===
The Thames Path follows the left bank above and below the lock.

== See also ==
- Locks on the River Thames
- Rowing on the River Thames

Next lock upstream	River Thames	Next lock downstream
Penton Hook Lock; 3.13 km (1.94 mi)	Chertsey Lock; Grid reference: TQ053668	Shepperton Lock; 3.32 km (2.06 mi)
