= Chertsey Regatta =

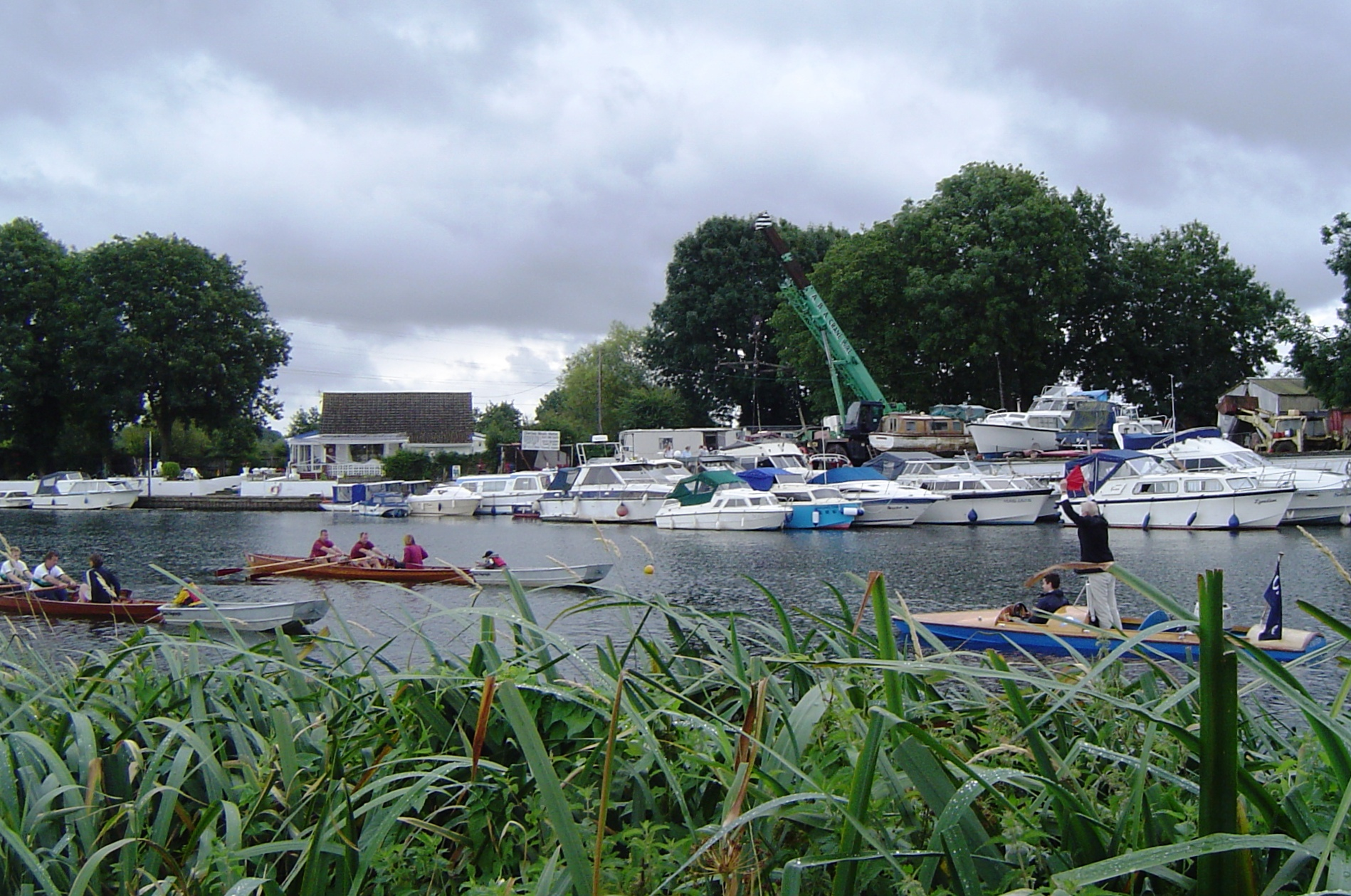
Start of a skiff race at Chertsey Regatta

Chertsey & Shepperton Regatta is a regatta on the River Thames in England which takes place on and by Dumsey Meadow near Chertsey, Surrey.

== History ==
The regatta was inaugurated in 1851 and is one of the oldest on the river. Early records are sparse. In two years the regatta was held upstream of Chertsey Bridge. Since the 1920s, with one or two exceptions, the regatta has been held annually alongside Dumsey Meadow. The detailed course has varied between different points and directions. The competition is for skiffing and punting.

Since 2004 Dumsey Meadow has in ecology been designated a Site of Special Scientific Interest. After discourse with local authorities and English Nature, agreement was reached allowing the regatta to continue its partial use of the site for one day each year. In acknowledgement of the support given by Spelthorne Borough Council who own the meadow, the name was modified to the Chertsey & Shepperton Regatta. The committee bought an adjacent field for parking in July 2008.

== See also ==
- Rowing on the River Thames
