= Penton Hook Marina =

Coordinates: 51°24′37″N -0°30′20″W

Penton Hook Marina is the largest inland marina in Britain. It is situated on the River Thames in Surrey between Staines and Chertsey on the western bank of the river and is close to Thorpe Park. It is on the reach above Chertsey Lock and opposite Penton Hook Island.

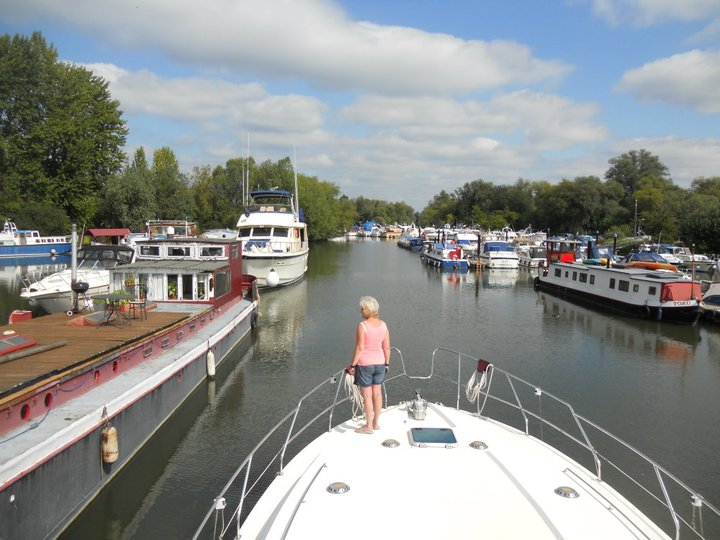
Boat maneuvering within Penton Hook Marina.

The marina is set in 80 acres of what were previously disused gravel pits. It has approximately 600 berths. The marina is downstream from Runnymede where King John signed Magna Carta.
