= Abbey River =

River in Surrey, England

Coordinates: 51°23′34″N 0°29′20″W

The Abbey River is a right-bank backwater of the River Thames in England, in Chertsey, Surrey — in the town's northern green and blue buffers. The L-shaped conduit adjoins mixed-use flood plain: water-meadows landscaped for a golf course, a motorway and a fresh water treatment works on the island it creates, Laleham Burway to its east and north in turn. Its offtake from the Thames is at the apex of Penton Hook, Staines upon Thames below its lower weir close to the Chertsey-Thorpe boundary in the Borough of Runnymede. Its outfall is the weir pool of Chertsey Lock back into the Thames, visible from Chertsey Bridge.

Under the "River Thames Scheme", proposed by the Environment Agency, a fish pass will be installed on the Abbey River and the riverbed will be lined with gravel to provide additional habitats for spawning. A new flood relief channel, intersecting the river, will be constructed to improve the drainage of floodwater from the Abbey Meads to the Thames.

== History and status ==
The 3.2 km (2.0 mi) long river, which was also known as Oxley, Oxlake or Oaklake Mill River or Stream was a leat cut by order of the Abbot of Chertsey Abbey in the eleventh century to supply power to the mill closest to their monastery/abbey and water their numerous fish ponds.

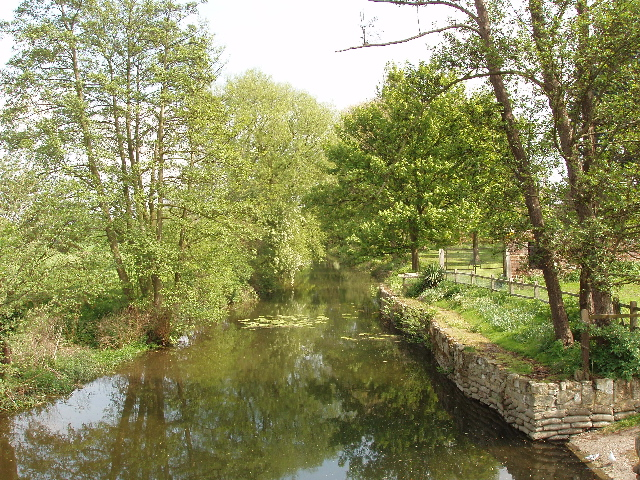
Abbey River north of the Abbey site. No longer a mill race, in summer time the channel is near-stagnant.

The Abbey River with the Thames encircles Laleham Burway also known as the Abbey Mead, which belonged to Chertsey Abbey founded in the 7th century AD of Anglo Saxon England. It forms a better-drained flood meadow beside the Thames and provides a mill race (leat). The bulk of its large island thereby formed passed to Laleham manor which for about seven centuries let it to farmers breeding and selling horses and cattle. In the 18th and 19th centuries the stream became ancillary to pasture, used for seasonal drainage and ornamental value of houses and a farm, Abbey Chase, adjoining its southern meander close to the centre of Chertsey, rather than corn, wheat and barley milling. It today contains Laleham Golf Course, park homes built of light materials on decking, a line of riverside homes and a groundwater fresh water waterworks with emergency/dry period storage reservoir, producing 60 Ml (13,000,000 imp gal) of drinking water per day. Laleham Burway re-incorporates in its modern definition Abbey Mead for many years considered its southern tract (and the parent of Laleham Burway in terms of naming). For more than a millennium the tract formed the largest Island in the non-tidal River Thames; namely the largest upstream of its tidal section known as the Tideway where there are two larger islands. It is much smaller than Canvey Island and the Isle of Sheppey and narrowly ahead of Andersey Island facing Abingdon-on-Thames, another market town with an abbey which had multiple medieval mills, another of note being Westminster Abbey, the island of which Thorney Island no longer exists. The outfall of the Abbey River is 400 m (1,300 ft) above Chertsey Bridge, into the weir pool of Chertsey Weir. The manmade strictly-considered "island" the bypass channel forms is outranked in size since the 2002 completion of the Jubilee River by the example containing Dorney and Eton, Berkshire.

== Flow and habitats ==
The flow is artificially constrained by less depth than medieval times and by numerous built-up weirs. These have the effect of tending to keep any flooding towards its upper reach when most prolonged-rain-event flooding occurs, sparing built-up parts of Chertsey in normal floods which occur every few years; for < 1-in-50-years (most severe) events the River Thames such as during the 2013-2014 Winter floods up to the arches of Chertsey Bridge — the statutory authority mainly tasked with reduction of flood risk has noted the Abbey River watercourse no longer provides a sufficient corollary and in its official view merits replacement, its flow being far less than in medieval times when it was a powerful mill race, having the by-product of draining flood waters upstream. The contemporary decades of reduced capacity (see deposition) and multiple-barraged flow has led to the Environment Agency to propose negligible use of its route in the creation of two seasonal drainage channels — partly due to better biodiversity in shallow rivers it is proposed to intersect its course possibly thereby slightly adding to its final flow, but with a main outflow channel across its existing island. Relevant officially planned channels:

- Channel 2 (specifically the red route, taken forward to strategy stage) across land and large lakes more inland on the right bank of the Thames
- Channel 3 (specifically the orange route, taken forward to strategy stage) across Dumsey Meadow and the bend below on the left bank of the Thames.

The Abbey River is a subchannel of the Thames, so is believed to have similar water quality and species to the main river.

=== Abbey Mill ===
This mill was one of several the institution owned in its vast Surrey estates — remaining substantial after some manors and small parcels were sold or gifted to wealthy local nobles and institutions, including Oxford and Cambridge Colleges. The land was added to the foremost Royal park, paying compensation to the abbot for his retirement, to expand Henry VIII's Windsor Great Park thereby covering much of the land from Wokingham and Sandhurst, Berkshire in the west to the River Wey east of Chertsey. Underlining these centuries of agricultural-based abbey wealth were useful "abbey mills" enjoying a local monopoly for grain — the Valor Ecclesiasticus of 1535 gives the clear annual value (surplus) of the abbey as £659 15s. 8¾d. (Note: equivalent to £489,651 in 2025) In 1608 two watermills on the river are recorded as the Oaklake Mylles.

=== 19th century proposal as a navigation channel ===
In 1809 the millers, in concert with City of London Corporation, offered the stream as the Thames navigation channel by building a weir to protect Chertsey, Shepperton, and other areas downstream from floods, as well as keeping water levels sufficiently deep, but the latter decided to pursue its own shorter route plans, so built Chertsey Weir and Lock. Much of the channel is lightly surrounded by trees and it is, at most, 980 m (3,220 ft) from the River Thames.

The site of the abbey was bought in 1861 by Mr Bartrop, the secretary to the Surrey Archaeological Society, a combination of earlier collections and other archaeologists centred at Guildford Museum. Among the "appurtenances" (land holdings and interests) of the site of the abbey were the "watermills known as the Oxlake or Okelake mills" and "a small river or brook known as the Abbey River or the Bargewater".

== Notes ==
Next confluence upstream	River Thames	Next confluence downstream
River Colne (north)	Abbey River	River Bourne, Chertsey; River Bourne, Addlestone (south)
