= Grade II* listed buildings in Spelthorne =

Spelthorne shown within Surrey

There are over 20,000 Grade II* listed buildings in England. This page is a list of the twelve Grade II* buildings in the district of Spelthorne in Surrey. For links to similar articles in relation to the other 10 districts of Surrey see Grade II* listed buildings in Surrey.

== Spelthorne ==
Name	Location	Type	Completed (Note: The date given is the date used by Historic England as significant for the initial building or that of an important part in the structure's description.)	Date designated	Grid ref. (Note: Sometimes known as OSGB36, the grid reference is based on the British national grid reference system used by the Ordnance Survey.) Geo-coordinates	Entry number (Note: The "List Entry Number" is a unique number assigned to each listed building and scheduled monument by Historic England.)	Image
Chertsey Bridge	(Littleton traditionally), SHEPPERTON close to Laleham Park; Chertsey, Runnymede (borough)	Bridge	1783–85	11 August 1952	TQ0542166624; 51°23′20″N 0°29′11″W	1204646	Chertsey Bridge More images
Church of St Mary	Staines-upon-Thames	Church	1828	11 August 1952	TQ0305671865; 51°26′11″N 0°31′08″W	1187031	Church of St Mary More images
Church of St Mary the Virgin	Sunbury-on-Thames	Church	1752	11 September 1951	TQ1062168514; 51°24′18″N 0°24′40″W	1029661	Church of St Mary the Virgin More images
Church of St Nicholas	Shepperton	Church	17th and 18th century	11 September 1951	TQ0770066593; 51°23′17″N 0°27′13″W	1178304	Church of St Nicholas More images
Dunmore House	Stanwell, STAINES-UPON-THAMES	House	c. 1720	11 August 1952	TQ0575274189; 51°27′25″N 0°28′46″W	1204875	Dunmore House More images
Laleham Abbey	Laleham, STAINES-UPON-THAMES	Country House	1803–06	25 November 1957	TQ0521668194; 51°24′11″N 0°29′20″W	1187014	Laleham Abbey More images
Littleton Manor	Littleton, SHEPPERTON (post town)	Hall House	15th century	9 December 1969	TQ0725968652; 51°24′24″N 0°27′33″W	1029672	Upload Photo
Lord Knyvett's Adult Education Centre	Stanwell, STAINES-UPON-THAMES (post town)	School	c. 1624	11 August 1952	TQ0599474367; 51°27′30″N 0°28′33″W	1204896	Lord Knyvett's Adult Education Centre More images
Manor House	Shepperton	House	c. 1820	9 December 1969	TQ0777066613; 51°23′18″N 0°27′09″W	1029694	Manor House More images
Sunbury Court	Sunbury-on-Thames	Country House	Early 18th century	11 September 1951	TQ1166069085; 51°24′35″N 0°23′45″W	1180231	Sunbury Court More images
The (former) Blue Anchor Public House	Staines	Town House	Early to mid 18th century	11 August 1952	TQ0342771528; 51°26′00″N 0°30′49″W	1204918	The (former) Blue Anchor Public House More images
The Rectory (Shepperton Rectory)	Shepperton	House	15th century	11 September 1951	TQ0769166632; 51°23′19″N 0°27′13″W	1029698	Upload Photo
