= Truss's Island =

Island in the River Thames, England

Coordinates: 51.4191°N 0.5134°W

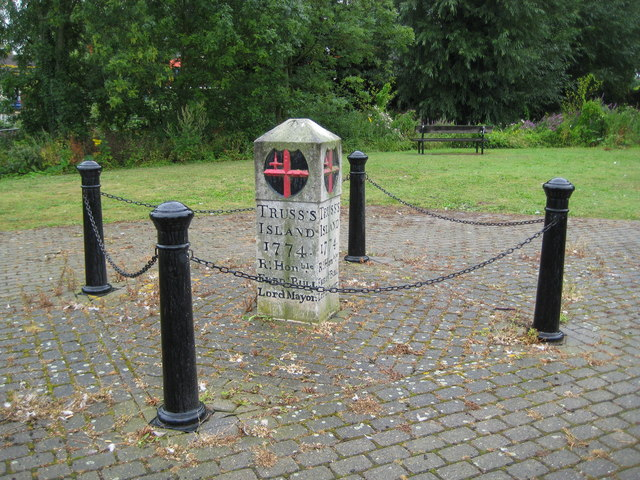
Inscribed stone erected by the City of London in 1804 to thank Charles Truss for 30 years' service in maintaining the navigability of the river

Truss's Island is a small island in the River Thames in England, between Staines-upon-Thames and Laleham. The uninhabited island is publicly accessible across two footbridges from the right (western) bank of the Thames and is landscaped with grass, trees and shrubs.

The island is named after Charles Truss, who improved the navigation of this section of the Thames while working for the City of London in the late 18th century. He is an ancestor of former British prime minister Liz Truss, who was the shortest-serving prime minister in British history.

== See also ==
- Islands in the River Thames

Next island upstream	River Thames	Next island downstream
Church Island	Truss's Island	Penton Hook Island
