= M3 Chertsey Bridge =

Bridge over the River Thames in South East England

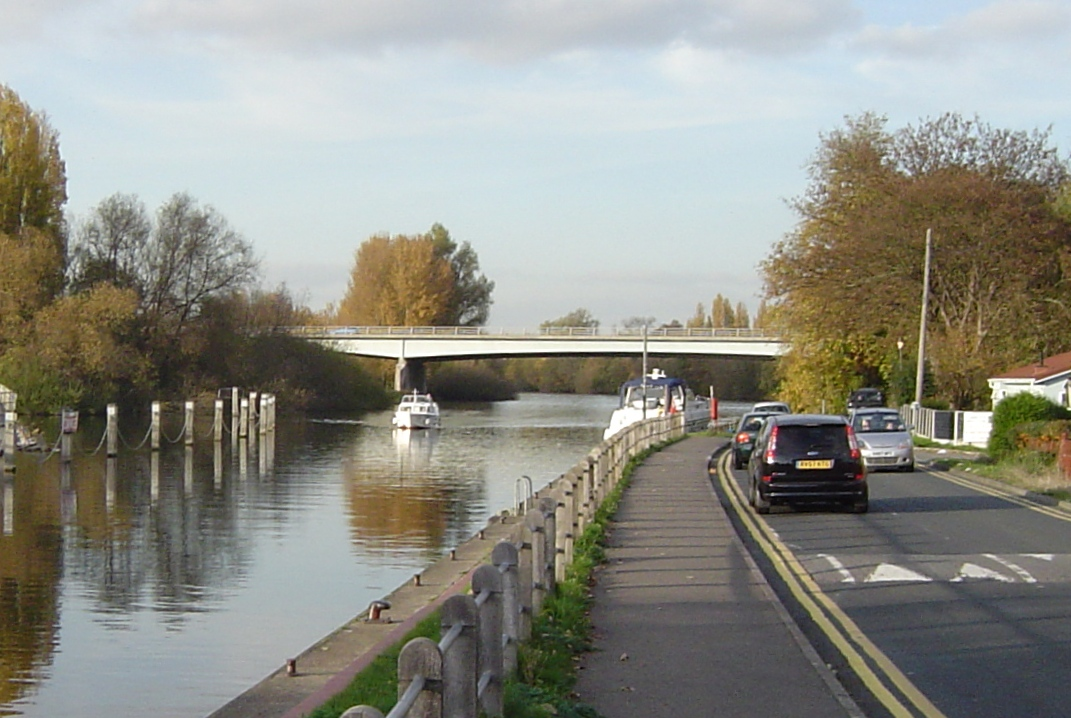
- M3 Motorway Bridge from Chertsey Lock
- Coordinates: 51°23′39″N 0°29′12″W
- Carries: M3 motorway
- Crosses: River Thames
- Locale: Chertsey, Surrey

Characteristics
- Material: Concrete, steel
- Total length: 400 ft (120 m)
- Longest span: 210 ft (64 m)
- No. of spans: 3
- Piers in water: 0
- Clearance below: 21 feet 4 inches (6.50 m)

History
- Opened: 11 July 1974

The M3 Chertsey Bridge is a motorway bridge in South East England built between December 1968 and March 1971. It carries the M3 over the navigable River Thames to the north of Chertsey Lock, near Chertsey, Surrey. It was opened to motorway traffic on 11 July 1974.

== Description ==
The M3 Chertsey Bridge crosses the navigable River Thames near Chertsey, Surrey. The central span, above the river channel, has a length of 210 ft (64 m) and the other two spans are 95 ft (29 m) long, giving a total length of 400 ft (120 m). The piers are on opposite banks of the river, immediately adjacent to the water's edge, and are 6 ft wide (1.8 m) at the base, tapering to 4 ft wide (1.2 m) at the top.

The bridge has a total width of 118 ft (36 m) between the aluminium parapets. It has two 7 ft thick (2.1 m) concrete decks, one for each carriageway. Each deck supports three running lanes, with a total width of 36 ft 8 in (11.18 m), and a 9 ft 10 in wide (3.00 m) hard shoulder. The motorway passes over the river in a gentle curve and the road surface is therefore cambered; as a result, the northern deck, which carries the eastbound carriageway, is higher than the southern deck. There is an expansion joint where the decks pass over the eastern abutment. Each road deck is supported by nine steel girders, and the clearance below the bridge for river traffic is 21 ft 4 in (6.50 m).

== History ==
Survey work for the eastern section of the M3 motorway from Sunbury-on-Thames to Basingstoke began in May 1962, and the provisional route was announced in December 1964. The construction of the bridge over the Thames at Chertsey began on 17 December 1968. It was designed by the engineering firm, Posford, Pavry and Partners, in collaboration with the consulting architect, Courtney Theobald. Steelwork was fabricated by Sir William Arrol & Co Ltd, and concrete work was undertaken by Caffin & Co.

The southern (downstream) deck was completed in Summer 1970 and was subsequently used by construction traffic to construct the motorway embankment, which crossed former gravel quarries. The bridge was completed by 31 March 1971 at a total cost of £330,000 (equivalent to £5.89 million in 2023). The Surrey section of the M3, including the bridge over the Thames, opened to the public on 11 July 1974.

== See also ==
- Crossings of the River Thames

Next crossing upstream	River Thames	Next crossing downstream
Staines Railway Bridge	M3 Chertsey Bridge	Chertsey Bridge
