= Laleham Burway =

Water-meadow and sports venue in England

Coordinates: 51°24′N 0°30′W

Laleham Burway is a 1.6-square-kilometre (0.62 sq mi) tract of water-meadow and former water-meadow between the River Thames and Abbey River in the far north of Chertsey in Surrey. Its uses are varied. Part is Laleham Golf Club. Semi-permanent park homes in the west form residential development along with a brief row of houses with gardens against the Thames. A reservoir and water works is on the island.

From at least the year 1278 its historic bulky northern definition formed part of the dominant estate of Laleham across the river, its manor, to which it was linked by a ferry until the early 20th century. Its owner in period from the mid-19th until the early 20th century was thus the Earl of Lucan; however when its manor house was sold to become Laleham Abbey, a short-lived nunnery, its tenants had taken it over or it was sold for public works. The southern part of the effective island sharing the name of the Burway or Laleham Burway was the Abbey Mead. It was kept since the seventh century among many square miles of land, priories, chantries, tithes (rectories) and churches of Chertsey Abbey until the Dissolution of the Monasteries.

The part legally separate from Abbey Mead (being together a large mill-race island with a broad corollary of the river beside them), the narrower definition comprised 200 acres (81 ha). In 1911 these remained largely for horse and cow pasture.

Part of it was a cricket venue in the 18th century, and the home of Chertsey Cricket Club; it staged numerous historically important matches. (Note: Any match listed in the ACS' Important Match Guide (1981) is historically important, and therefore of the highest standard, whether or not a scorecard might exist. The same applies to numerous matches discovered by researchers since 1981. For further information, see First-class cricket.)

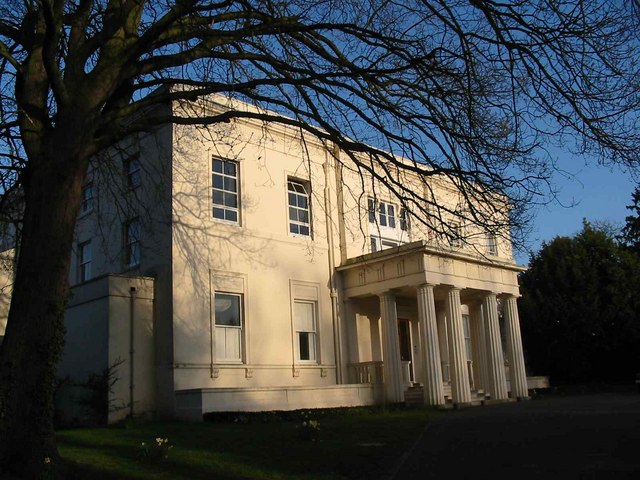
Altered 1806-version of the house across its gardens (park) on the opposite bank which owned the bulk of the land now thought to have been Laleham Burway. The house has been divided into apartments

== Early ownership, watermill and agricultural purposes ==
The near-triangular bulk of the ground measured as about 200 acres (81 ha) on the right bank of the Thames in 1911 constitutes its narrow, historical definition to distinguish Laleham Burway's at times separate ownership from Abbey Mead. This north part of the island later thus marked Laleham Burway (also called the Burway) was divided from the Abbey Mead of Chertsey by a seasonal ditch, the Burway Ditch, and by another from the meadow of Mixnams on the north. The triangle was equally Chertsey parish, but belonged to the manor of Laleham. It is mentioned as the Island of Burgh in the original endowment of Chertsey Abbey between 666 and 675, and is described as separated from Mixtenham (or Mixnams) "by water", which formed part of the boundary of the abbey lands, but it is not clear which of the two lay within the bounds of the abbey. Tradition says that the Burway originally belonged to Chertsey, and that in a time of great scarcity and famine the inhabitants of Laleham supplied the abbey with necessaries which those of Chertsey could not, or would not provide, in return for which the abbot granted them the use of this piece of ground. Whatever the truth of this story, it is certain that the Abbey of Westminster when holding Laleham manor held land on the Surrey bank of the river, and that in the time of Edward I it held part of the meadow called Mixtenham — in a dispute with the abbey of Chertsey in 1278, Westminster agreed to release their right in this meadow in return for 4 acres of pasture contiguous with that which they already held. In 1370 they still held some pasture in Mixtenham.

The Burway is in a grant of Laleham manor during the 18th century. At the beginning of the 19th century it is described as paying no tithes or taxes to either parish. In 1911 it belonged to owners of estates within the manor of Laleham, and the pasture was divided into 300 parts called 'farrens,' the tenancies of which was granted variously to feed horses or to support cow and a half at £1 17s. 6d. and £1 5s. annually, respectively. If a farren was sold it was worth about £40. The Burway was not inclosed under the Laleham Inclosure Act 1774 (14 Geo. 3. c. 114 Pr.) for inclosing the common fields of Laleham Manor in Chertsey, exempted from the act of Parliament of 1808 for inclosing Laleham but inclosed under the Laleham Burway Inclosure Act 1813 (53 Geo. 3. c. 25 Pr.), when the Earl of Lucan, new lord of the manor, acquired by allotment and purchase about 70 acres (28 ha).

Laleham Burway (including Abbey Mead, its parent and together forming one main island) is the largest island of the non-tidal course of the River Thames in England upstream of the Tideway — if disqualifying the villages of Dorney and Eton, Berkshire enclosed by the 2002-completed Jubilee River.

== Cricket history ==
Laleham Burway cricket ground
- Interactive map of Laleham Burway cricket ground
- Location: near Chertsey, Surrey
- Home club: Chertsey Cricket Club
- County club: Surrey
- Establishment: by 1736
- Last used: before 1856

During the 1736 English cricket season Chertsey Cricket Club played matches against Croydon and London. It is known that two games were played against Croydon before July that season: one at Duppas Hill in Croydon and the other at the Laleham Burway ground.

=== Wide bat controversy ===
Numerous matches were played at Laleham Burway during the 18th century. It has long been believed that it was the venue for the wide bat controversy, which led to a change in The Laws of Cricket. Although it is by means certain, and the evidence has been disputed, the match in question was Chertsey v Hambledon on Monday, 23 and Tuesday, 24 September 1771.

=== 1772 to 1784 ===
Several important matches were played on the ground in the 1770s, many with Surrey as the home team, and one between England (i.e., the "rest" of England) and Hampshire.

The ground is known to have been used by Chertsey until June 1784, although it has been used in the 20th century for some cricket. Chertsey Cricket Club had "ceased to exist" by 1856 and its revival began at the Recreation Ground in Chertsey, followed by its present ground, Grove Road, after the First World War.

== Bibliography ==
- ACS (1981). A Guide to Important Cricket Matches Played in the British Isles 1709–1863. Nottingham: ACS. OCLC 85045528.
- Mote, Ashley (1997). The Glory Days of Cricket. Robson. ISBN 978-18-61051-11-0.
- Nyren, John (1998) [1832]. Mote, Ashley (ed.). The Cricketers of my Time. London: Robson Publishing. ISBN 978-18-61051-68-4.

== See also ==
- Abbey River
- Islands in the River Thames
- Laleham
- Watermill leats
- Water-meadow
- Chertsey Abbey

Next island upstream	River Thames	Next island downstream
Penton Hook Island	Laleham Burway including Abbey Mead	Pharaoh's Island, River Thames
