= Penton Hook Island =

Island in the River Thames, England

Coordinates: 51°24′42″N 0°30′07″W

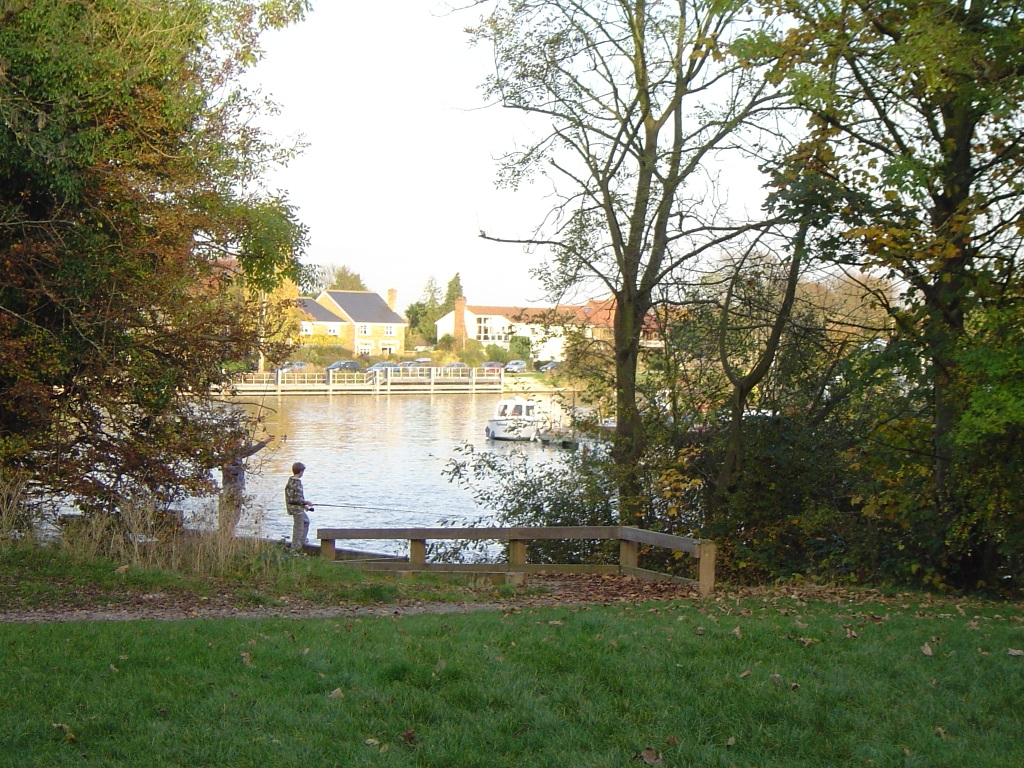
Fishing at Penton Hook Island

Penton Hook Island is a mainly wooded former peninsula created into a series of three weir-divided islands in the River Thames in England, so created in river modifications since 1815 with a navigable lock and weir stream channel to form meander cutoffs. It has a lock and weirs that are the division between the Laleham Reach, above Chertsey Lock and Staines Reach, above Penton Hook Lock.

== Geographical features ==
At this point the natural course of the River Thames forms naturally almost a complete loop, a hook shape of a peninsula which is attached to the towpath (here, northerly) bank in the form of walk-over, relatively wide, lock gates. The long hook or spit of land forms today a series of three weir-divided islands in the river, adjacent to Penton Hook Lock. It has been since at least the medieval period the southern extremity of Staines upon Thames. Across the river it neighbours Penton Hook Marina, Penton Hook Yacht Club and riverside homes of Thorpe, Surrey, to the west and similar homes along Laleham Reach, Chertsey to the south and east, the latter being the most distant part of Chertsey from the town itself.

In administrative geography the area forms the southern extreme of the ancient (and current as of 2015) ecclesiastical parish of Staines. Its low-lying periodic winter flood-meadow status has deterred habitation. It is more robustly protected from initiatives to construct on greenfield sites by being part of the Metropolitan Green Belt settled national planning policy.

The three sluice-controlled barrages allow control of the river at its highest by the construction of the large weir at the apex of the long loop and further weirs along the narrow north section.

The uninhabited island in public ownership is fairly wooded and is used for nature conservation and appreciation. The west has a backwater dug out to provide a fish refuge when the stream is strong and a fish spawning stream constructed in 1999. The island has many paths laid out for viewing its trees, squirrels, nesting birds, fish and waterfowl. These particularly cater for angling; for the Thames two permits are issued by the Environment Agency that can be bought online or in post offices.

== History ==
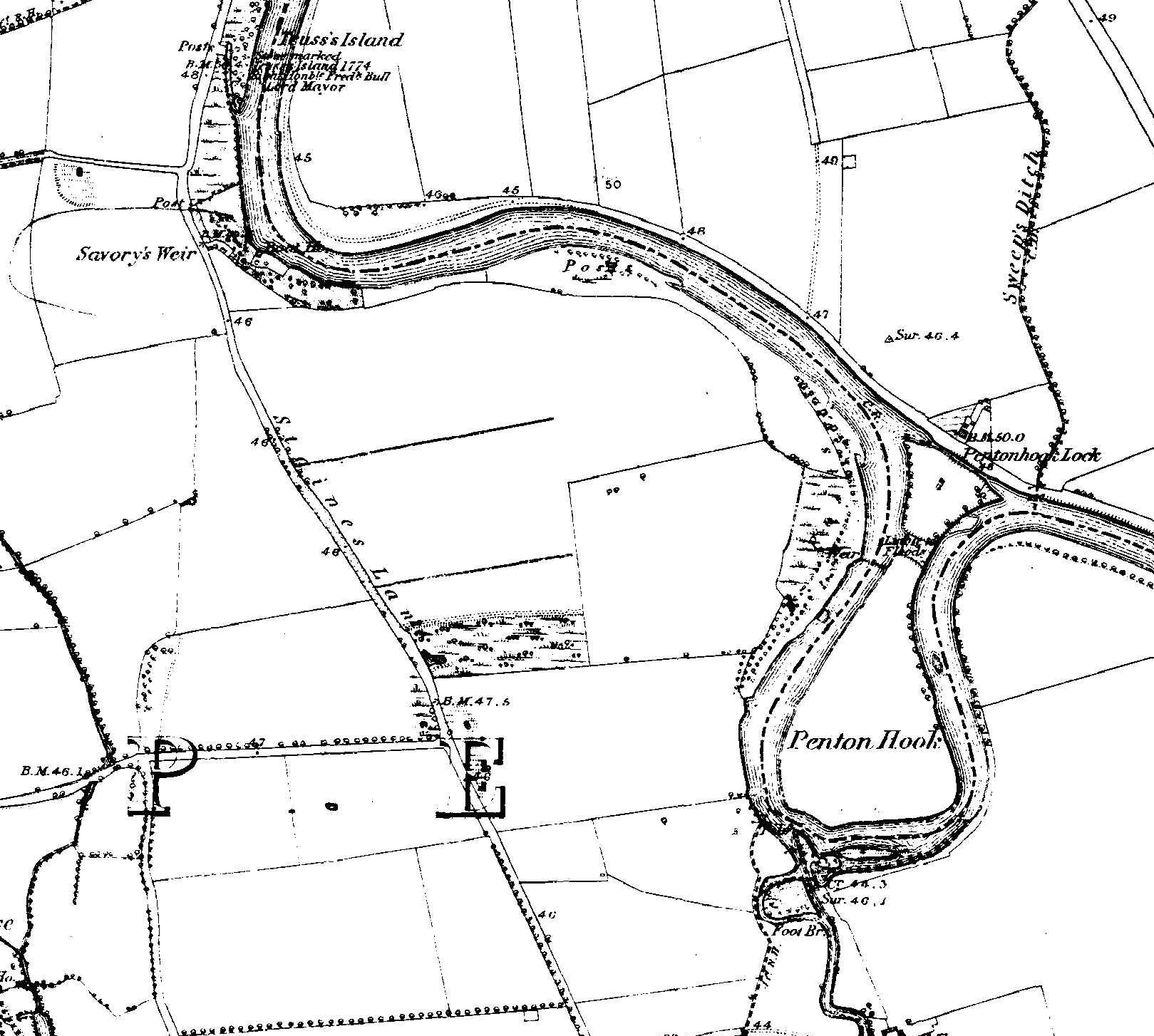
Extract from Map of Middlesex, Ordnance Survey, 1868–1883. This notes a defunct site of Savory's Weir (in the north west) above today's weir then in place, with Penton Hook in the south east

The island was created when Penton Hook Lock was built, although before the lock was built in 1815, Thames waters would often flood across the neck of the "hook". The section of river has long been the subject of weirs for fishing and to improve boating for fishing and trade.

The monks of Chertsey Abbey understood they could use the re-doubling of the river on itself here to construct today's Abbey River, their leat (mill stream) from the Thames south of the Island past their Abbey in Chertsey before the Thames. This benefited 300 let farrens (parts) for horse and cow grazing on their bypassed flood meadow to the south, each at more than £1 per year each by the 19th century, Laleham Burway. The revenue contributed to a partial ownership dispute between Chertsey and Westminster Abbeys (owner of Laleham Manor) in 1278 — Westminster's almost adjacent built-up settlement (manor) of Laleham was enlarged by four acres in return for repudiating all claims to the lower mead.

During the 18th century, the city of London, which administered this stretch of the river, made a number of attempts to abolish the fish-weirs which impeded navigation. There had been at least one weir near Staines in the Middle Ages: it was called Savoury's Weir or Deep Weir and was probably by the curve in the river near Riverside Drive. The city authorities constructed the lock across Penton Hook in 1815 because of frequent floods.

— Victoria County History for Middlesex, 1962, Susan Reynolds (Ed.)

== See also ==
- Islands in the River Thames

Next island upstream	River Thames	Next island downstream
Truss's Island	Penton Hook Island	Laleham Burway including Abbey Mead
