= Chertsey Bridge =

Bridge in South East England

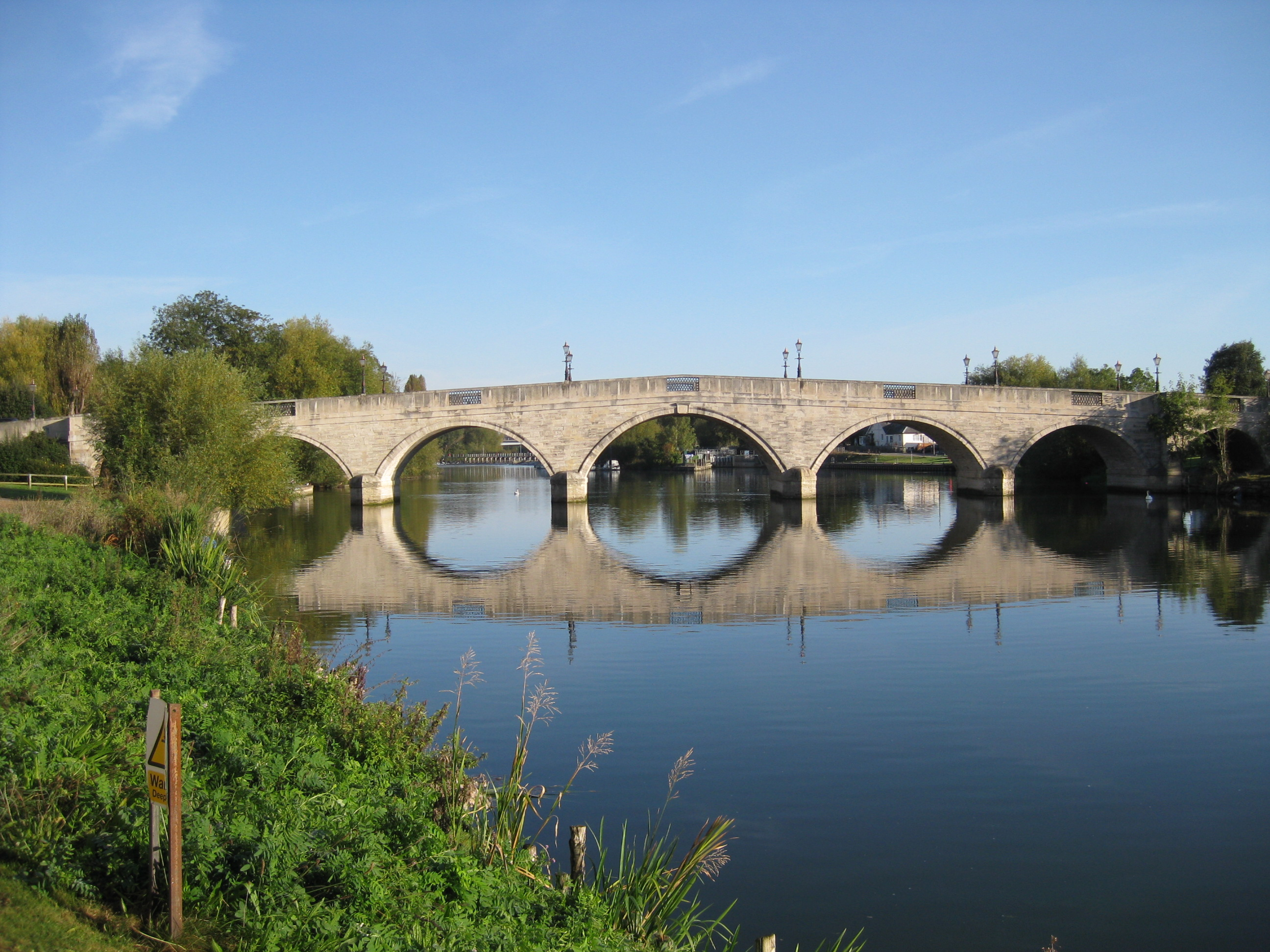
- Chertsey Bridge
- Coordinates: 51°23′20″N 0°29′11″W
- Carries: B375 road
- Crosses: River Thames
- Locale: Chertsey, Laleham
- Maintained by: Surrey County Council
- Heritage status: Grade II listed building

Characteristics
- Design: arch
- Material: Purbeck limestone, brick
- Width: 7.16 m (23 ft 6 in)
- No. of spans: 7
- Piers in water: 5
- Clearance below: 5.82 m (19.1 ft)

History
- Designer: James Paine
- Opened: 1785

Location
- Interactive map of Chertsey Bridge

Chertsey Bridge is a road bridge across the River Thames in Surrey, England. It carries the B375 road, connecting Chertsey in the borough of Runnymede to Laleham in the borough of Spelthorne. It is 550 yards (500 m) downstream from the M3 motorway bridge over the Thames and is close to Chertsey Lock. The current, seven-arch bridge was built 1783–85 and is a Grade II*-listed building. It has a weight restriction of 18 tonnes for LGVs.

== Description ==
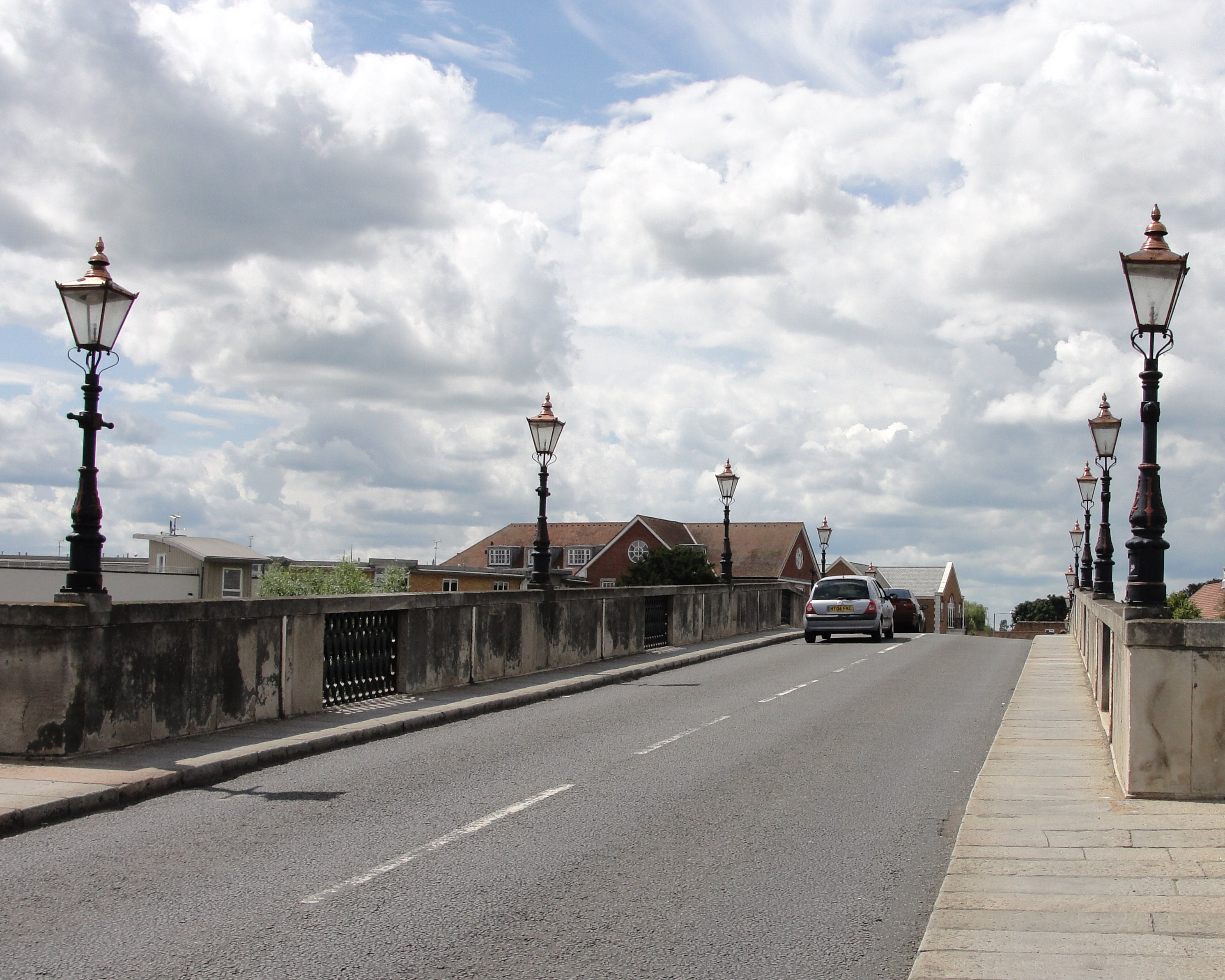
The B375 road passing over Chertsey Bridge

Chertsey Bridge carries B375 road over the River Thames in Surrey, South East England. It connects the town of Chertsey in the borough of Runnymede on the south bank of the river (sometimes known as the "Surrey bank") to the village of Laleham in the borough of Spelthorne on the opposite side (sometimes known as the "Middlesex bank"). The width, measured between the parapets, is 7.16 m (23 ft 6 in) and the bridge has a total of seven arches, of which five span the river. The construction of the bridge is commemorated with a datestone inscribed: "Began in 1780 : finished in 1785"; a second stone records the repairs completed in 1894, after a barge damaged one of the piers.

The five arches over the river are constructed of Purbeck limestone and the two arches on either side, sometimes described as "flood arches", have brick rings with limestone voissoirs. The largest arch has a width of 12.8 m (42 ft) and provides a headway of 5.82 m (19.1 ft) for river navigation. The lampposts were added in the 1930s and the bridge was designated a grade II*-listed building in August 1952.

At the south-east end of the bridge, on the Middlesex bank, is a late 19th-century cast-iron coal-tax post with cornice and capping, and the City of London shield on one face. It is grade II listed. The Thames Path runs along the north bank of the river, passing beneath the easternmost arch of Chertsey Bridge.

== History ==
Chertsey Abbey was founded in 666 AD and the first surviving mention of the surrounding town is by Bede in around 750. The Domesday Book of 1087 records a population of 65 households and Chertsey was granted a market charter by Henry I in the early 12th century. By the 13th century, there were two bridges in the town, both of which crossed the River Bourne.

The first recorded crossing of the Thames at Chertsey is from 1300, when a ferry-woman called Sibille was paid three shillings to carry Edward I across the river. The first bridge may have been built by John de Rutherwyke, the abbot of Chertsey from 1307 to 1346, but there are reports of a ferry in 1368 and 1376. A license to build a bridge over the Thames was granted by Henry IV in 1410. In 1510, Thomas Wriothesley, 1st Earl of Southampton, paid £189 for the "repaire and new making of the greate bridge called Chertsey bridge" and in around 1530, the antiquarian, John Leland, noted a "goodly Bridg of Timber newly repaird".

Repairs were undertaken in 1573–1574 following a partial collapse of the bridge into the Thames. By 1580, the wooden structure, "210 feet in length and 15 feet in breadth", was again in need of repair and a commission of enquiry was established to determine the nature of the works required. The necessary works were funded by the Crown, as successors to the abbey, and cost a total of £113 15s. A more expensive repair was undertaken between 1593 and 1597, costing £117 6s 6d. A document from 1661 indicates that the bridge was frequently damaged by boats: "the abuses and iniuryes that have beene of late committed by diuers bargemen passinge and towinge their Vessells through Chertsey bridge by reason of their neglect and carelessness in managinge of their barges and vessells whereby the said bridge is oftentimes broaken and battered". In 1774, the bridge, which crossed the river at an oblique angle, was described as being very inconvenient and dangerous to river traffic, particularly when navigating downstream.

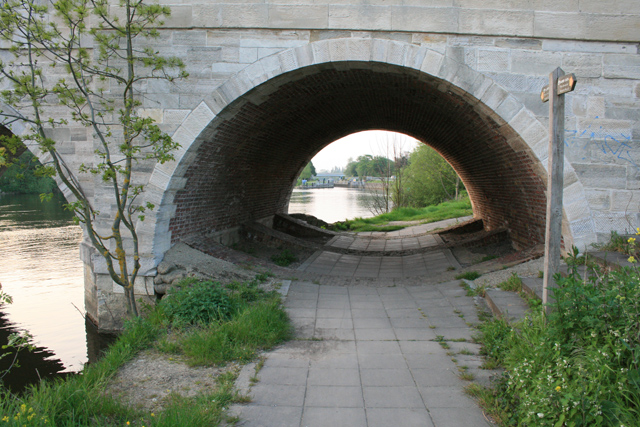
The Thames Path running beneath the flood arch on the Middlesex side of the bridge

A petition to rebuild Chertsey Bridge was presented at the Surrey court of quarter sessions in January 1779, and committees of repair were established for both Surrey and Middlesex. The architect, James Paine, and surveyor, Kenton Couse, were commissioned to produce a scheme of work and proposed a new stone bridge. In November 1779, the construction of the current Chertsey Bridge was authorised, upstream of the existing wooden structure. Work began the following year and the keystone was laid by Thomas Onslow, 2nd Earl of Onslow, and Hugh Percy, 1st Duke of Northumberland, representing Surrey and Middlesex respectively. The old bridge was auctioned in August 1784 and towards the end of that year, it became apparent that the new bridge would not wide be enough to allow access from the banks. One additional arch was required at each end at a cost of £2,800. The works were completed in 1785. The bridge was originally constructed with semicircular recesses over the piers, but these were removed in 1805.

In October 1891, a barge broke free of its moorings during a flood and damaged one of the piers supporting the centre arch. The bridge was closed and a cofferdam was erected to protect the affected pier. Rebuilding work was undertaken by Docwra and was completed in late 1894.

Following a structural survey in 1986, concerns were raised over the strength of the bridge and the condition of the stonework. Chertsey Bridge was closed to all traffic from May 1991 while repairs were carried out, with vehicles diverted over a temporary Bailey bridge across the river. The work, undertaken by Mowlem on behalf of Surrey County Council, included the installation of a reinforced concrete "saddle" beneath the roadway, to better distribute the weight of traffic. The total cost of the works was £1.2 million, of which around £500,000 was used to replace damaged and weathered stonework. The bridge was reopened to vehicles in December 1991.

== Culture ==
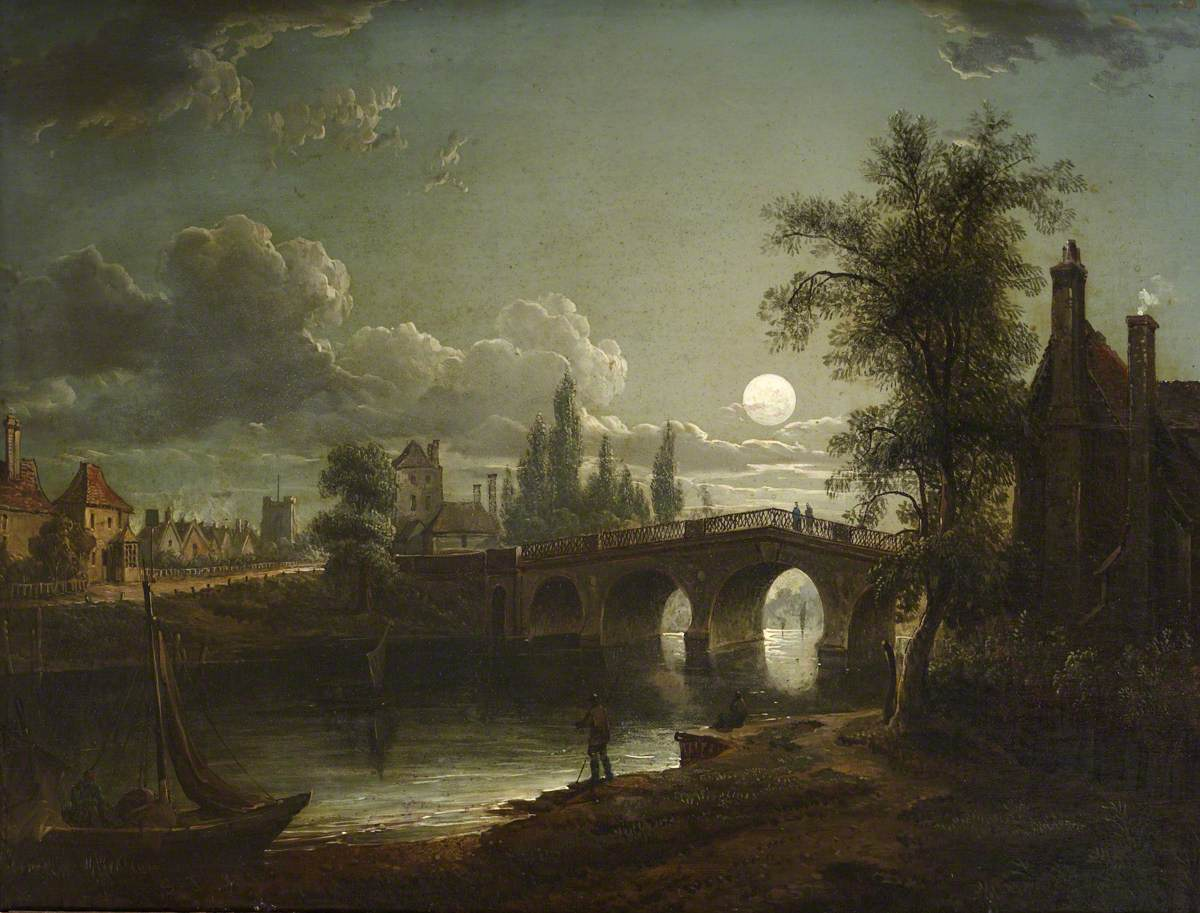
Chertsey Bridge by Moonlight by Sebastian Pether

The Tate holds a pencil sketch of Chertsey Bridge by the artist J. M. W. Turner (1775–1851). A watercolour of the bridge by John Hassell (c. 1767–1825), dated 1823, is held at the Surrey History Centre. An oil painting, entitled Chertsey Bridge by Moonlight, by Sebastian Pether (1790–1844), is held by the National Trust at Anglesey Abbey and the bridge appears in the painting Chertsey Preserve by William Robert Earl (1806–1880), held by Chertsey Museum.

Chertsey Bridge is mentioned in Chapter XXXI of the 1838 novel, Oliver Twist, by Charles Dickens and appears in the 1945 comedy‑drama film, The Rake's Progress.

== See also ==
- Crossings of the River Thames
- Grade II* listed buildings in Spelthorne

== Bibliography ==
- Chalkin, Christopher W. (1988). English counties and public building: 1650-1830. London: Hambledon Press. ISBN 978-1-85-285153-8.
- Dickens, Charles (1838). Oliver Twist. Vol. II. London: Richard Bentley.
- Gover, J.E.B; Mawer, A.; Stenton, F.M. (1969). The place-names of Surrey. Cambridge: Cambridge University Press.
- Malden, H.E., ed. (1911). A History of the County of Surrey. Vol. 3. London: Victoria County History.
- Mindell, Ruth; Mindell, Jonathan (1985). Bridges over the River Thames. Poole: Blandford Press. ISBN 978-0-71-371542-2.
- Palmer, J.; Cogswell, G. (1993). "94: Bridge strengthening in practice". In Harding, J.E.; Parke, G.A.R.; Ryall, M.J. (eds.). Bridge Management. Vol. 2: Inspection, maintenance and repair. London: Thomas Telford. ISBN 978-0-72-771926-3.
- Smith, Denis (2001). London and the Thames Valley. Civil engineering heritage. London: Thomas Telford. ISBN 978-0-72-772876-0.
- Thacker, Fred S. (1968) [1920]. The Thames highway. Vol. II: Locks and weirs. Newton Abbot: David & Charles. ISBN 978-0-71-534233-6.

Next bridge upstream	River Thames	Next bridge downstream
M3 Chertsey Bridge	Chertsey Bridge; Grid reference TQ0541266625	Shepperton to Weybridge Ferry (pedestrian)
