= Laleham =

Village and parish in Surrey, England

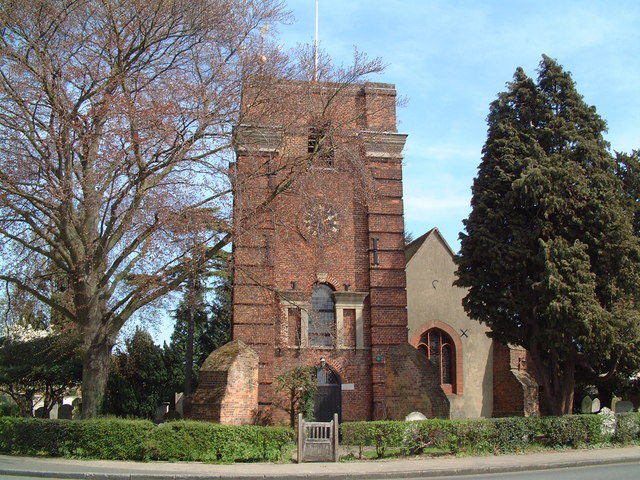
- West front of All Saints' parish church

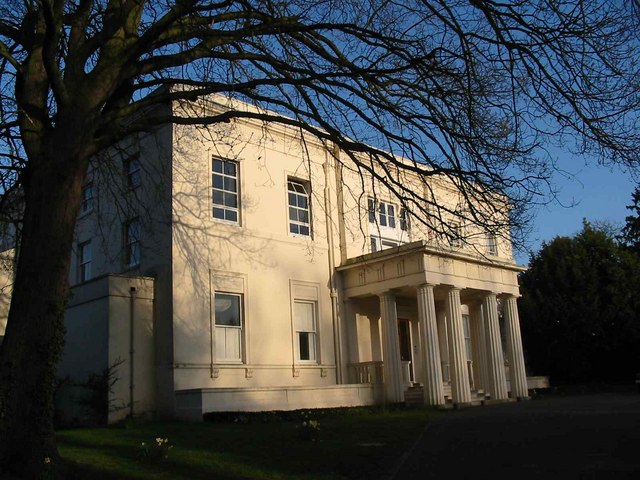
- Laleham Abbey

- Location within Surrey
- Area: 5.33 km^{2} (2.06 sq mi)
- Population: 4,782 (2011 census) (area notionally includes Queen Mary Reservoir)
  - Density: 897/km^{2} (2,320/sq mi)
- OS grid reference: TQ052689
  - London: 18.5 miles (29.8 km)
- District: Spelthorne
- Shire county: Surrey
- Region: South East
- Country: England
- Sovereign state: United Kingdom
- Post town: STAINES-UPON-THAMES
- Postcode district: TW18
- Dialling code: 01784
- Police: Surrey
- Fire: Surrey
- Ambulance: South East Coast
- UK Parliament: Spelthorne

Laleham is a village on the River Thames, in the borough of Spelthorne, about 17 mi (27 km) west of central London, England. Historically part of the county of Middlesex, it was transferred to Surrey in 1965. Laleham is downriver from Staines-upon-Thames and upriver from Chertsey.

The north of the area has a number of sports fields, including the Staines and Laleham Sports Ground, and two family pubs, one each on the Laleham and Ashford Roads. Laleham Park, by the River Thames, is south of the village.

Laleham is just over 3 miles (5 km) from three motorway junctions. The nearest railway station is Staines, 1.5 miles (2.4 km) north, on the Waterloo to Reading Line.

The poet Matthew Arnold (1822–88) lived here, dividing his time between Laleham and Rugby School.

== History ==
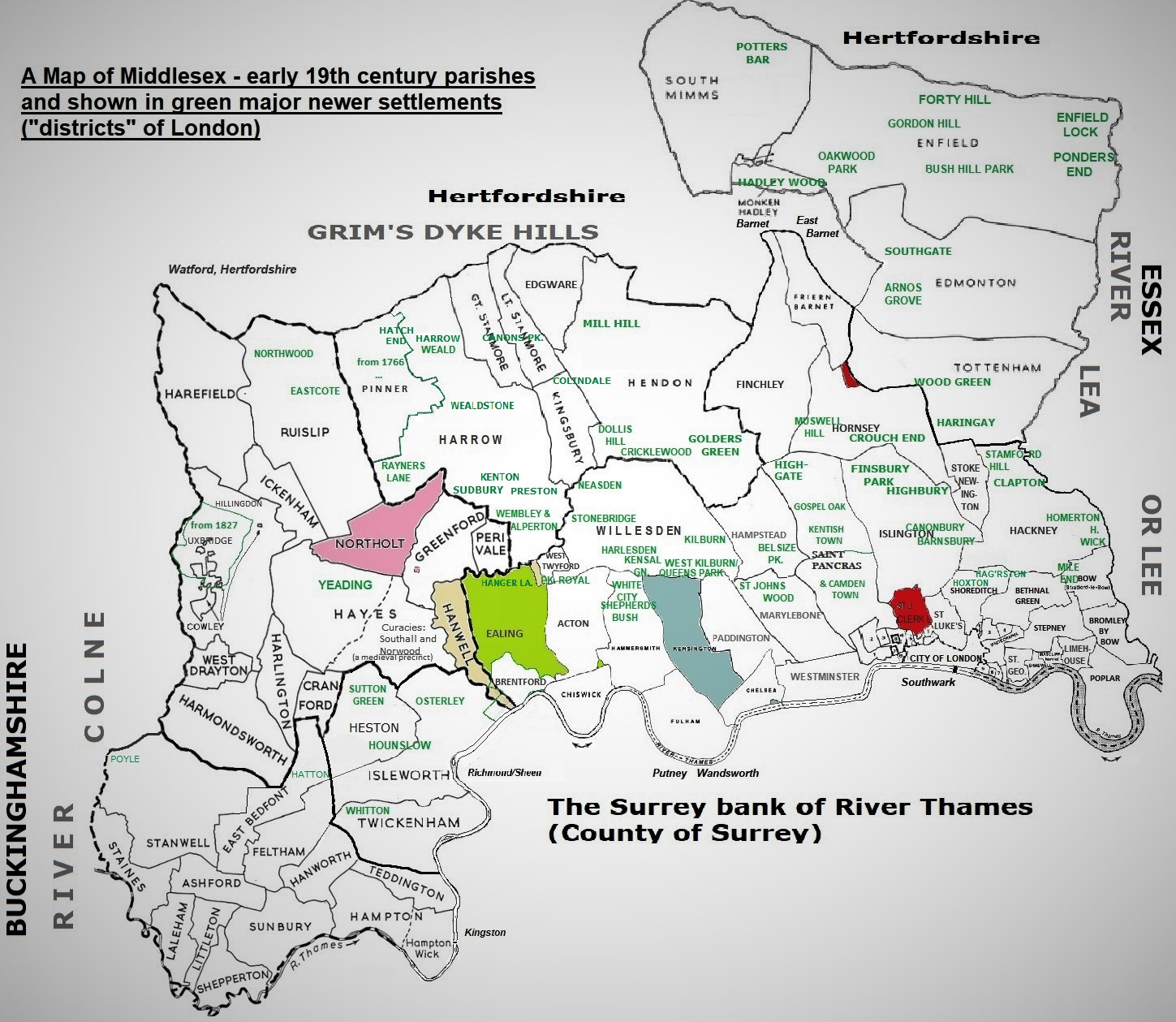
The parish is almost unchanged in size in a thousand years. It as at 2018 has no civil parish council and so is only ecclesiastical (since the English Reformation in the Church of England) and considered when redrawing wards of the United Kingdom for local government elections.

The toponym "Laleham" comes from lael meaning twig and hamm (land in a river bend) or from Lella's ham (cognate with holm or homestead), meaning farmstead owned by a person named similarly to the first syllable.

There may have been a 1st-century Roman marching camp in the far north, in a field which is now part of Matthew Arnold School.

Iron Age spearheads from the 5th century have been found in the Thames at the point where a ferry used to run. Tenth century charters, see Chertsey Abbey (which long owned the lands surrounding its Abbey across the Thames) record the village/parish as Laelham.

The Middlesex section of the Domesday Book of 1086 records the village as Leleham. The manor was held partly by Fécamp Abbey from Robert of Mortain and by Estrild, the nun; its owner before Norman Conquest there recorded as Aki (the Dane). Middlesex formed the far south of the Danelaw. Its Domesday assets were: 10 hides of land, 6½ ploughs, 5 ploughlands, meadow and cattle pasture. Its villagers and chief tenants rendered £5 per year to its feudal overlords. The manor of Laleham was within a few generations held by Westminster Abbey throughout its monetary heyday.

The Church of England parish church of All Saints dates from the 12th century but was largely rebuilt in brick about 1600 and the present tower was built in 1780. It is a Grade I listed building. The church has a stained glass window by Wilhelmina Geddes. In the 13th century Westminster Abbey records its Laleham grange and watermill on the banks of the Thames near the site of Laleham Manor House (later briefly a Catholic revival 'Abbey'). In 1970 the clustered village centre of Laleham was designated a conservation area. The traditional borders resemble Staines in being a long tract of land, rarely more than 1 mile (1.6 km) east–west.

In 1951 the civil parish had a population of 3,166. On 1 April 1974 the parish was abolished.

Today, Laleham has a Church of England primary school, an archery club and Burway Rowing Club.

== Buildings ==
Laleham has 25 listed buildings. Church Farmhouse, next to All Saints' church, is an early 17th-century brick farmhouse with Georgian alterations. It is an example of a central chimney house with a standard layout for such a house. On either side of the central chimney is a living room and the entrance is through a tiled two-storey porch, the stairs filling the space on the opposite side of the chimney. It once housed the Lucan's bailiff. It was sold in 1966 by the profligate 7th Earl. Eight years later he was suspected of the murder of his family nanny in Lower Belgrave Street, London and disappeared.

=== Laleham Abbey ===
51.4031°N 0.4887°W
Laleham Abbey was Laleham House or Laleham Manor House from the medieval period until 1928, the sole manor in the parish and taking in 200 acres (0.81 km^{2}) on the opposite bank of the river let out to agricultural tenants — Laleham Burway after a medieval grant from and dispute with Chertsey Abbey. Designed by J.B. Papworth, the house was wholly rebuilt in 1803–06 as the British country seat of The 2nd Earl of Lucan, an Anglo-Irish peer, and altered, employing Papworth again, in the 1820s and 1830s. It is a Grade II* listed building, the middle classification. Its private demesne (park) spanned 83 acres (34 ha), much of which is a public amenity, with riverside refreshments, playgrounds, football areas, fishing, camping and a cross-country circuit. The house is neoclassical with a Doric portico. Inside are marble floors and columns, a semi-circular staircase and a cupola. Maria II of Portugal stayed here for the English part of her tour of three European courts due to Miguel of Portugal's 1826–1834 insurrection. It was for some decades let to the Catholic Church in the early 20th century, acquiring its Abbey status as a Nunnery. The house was divided into apartments in 1981.

=== Churches ===
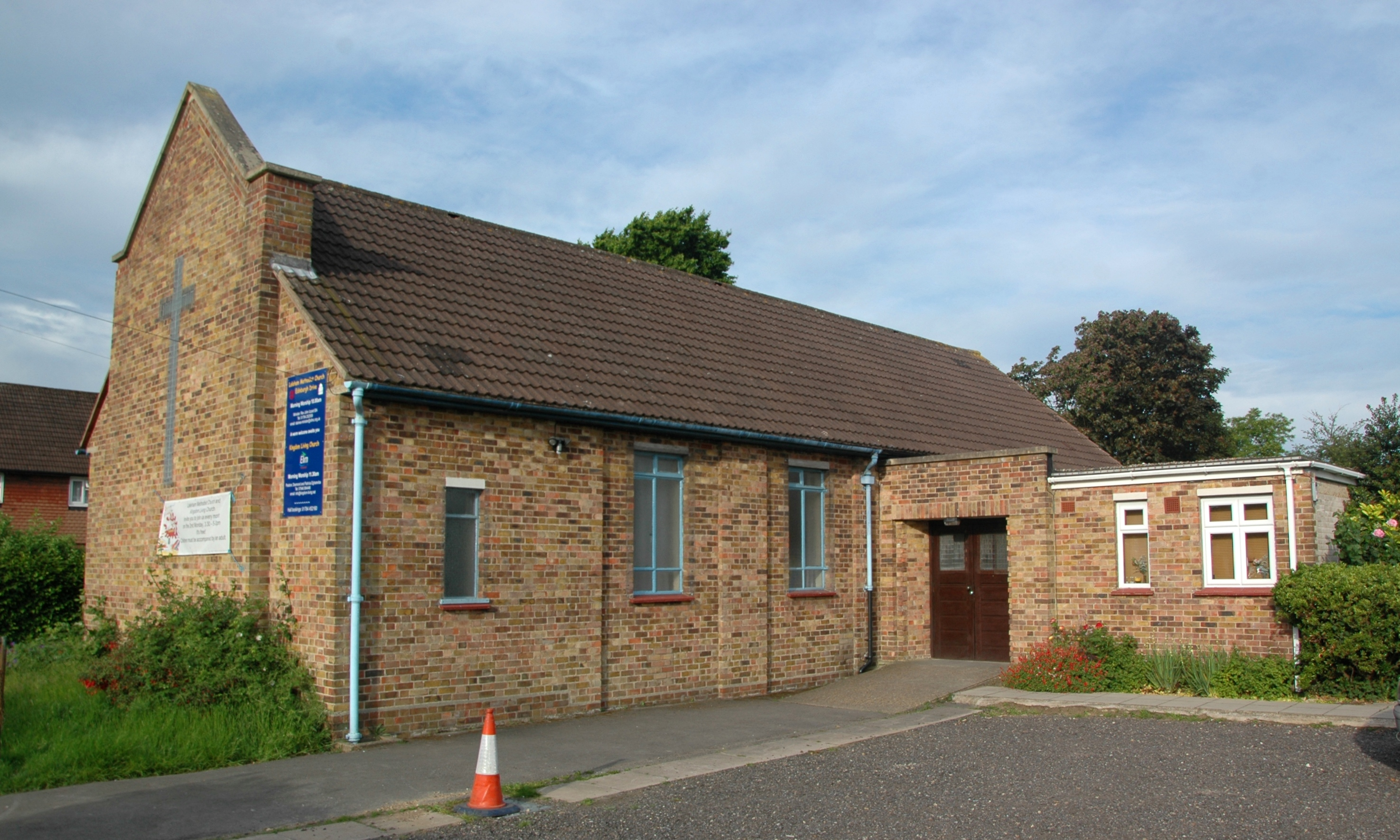
Laleham Methodist church

All Saints' Church is an evangelical Anglican Church. It has a hatchment of the Earls of Lucan in the north aisle; east of the vestry in the churchyard is the Lucan gravesite.

Laleham has a Methodist church in Edinburgh Drive. An Elim Pentecostal Church, Kingdom Living Church, also meets at the Methodist church.

== Notable people ==
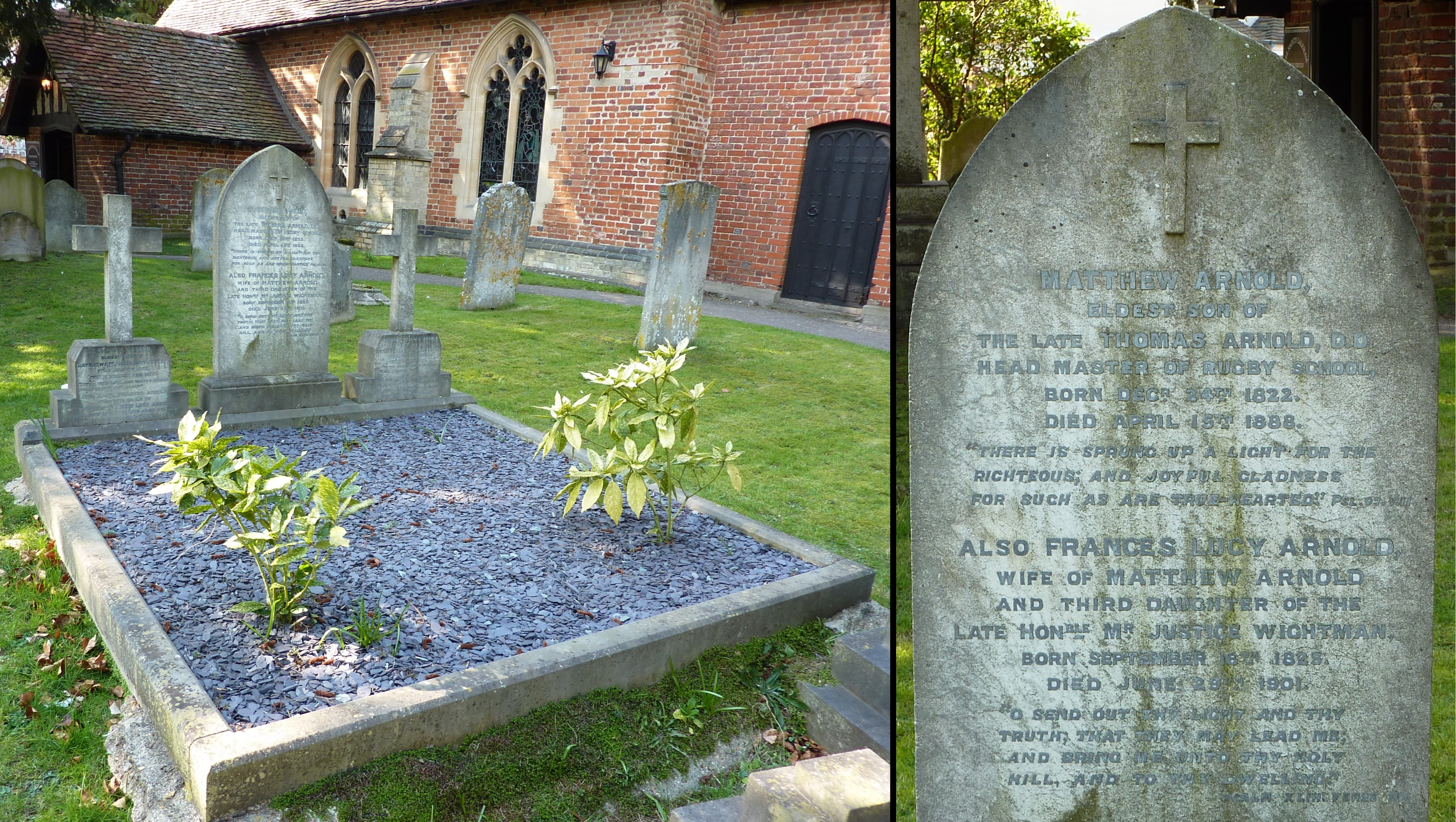
Matthew Arnold's grave

The poet and critic Matthew Arnold was born in the village and is buried in All Saints' parish churchyard. A local county-supported comprehensive school is named after him. His father Dr Thomas Arnold was headmaster of Rugby School, travelled widely and settled his family in Laleham.

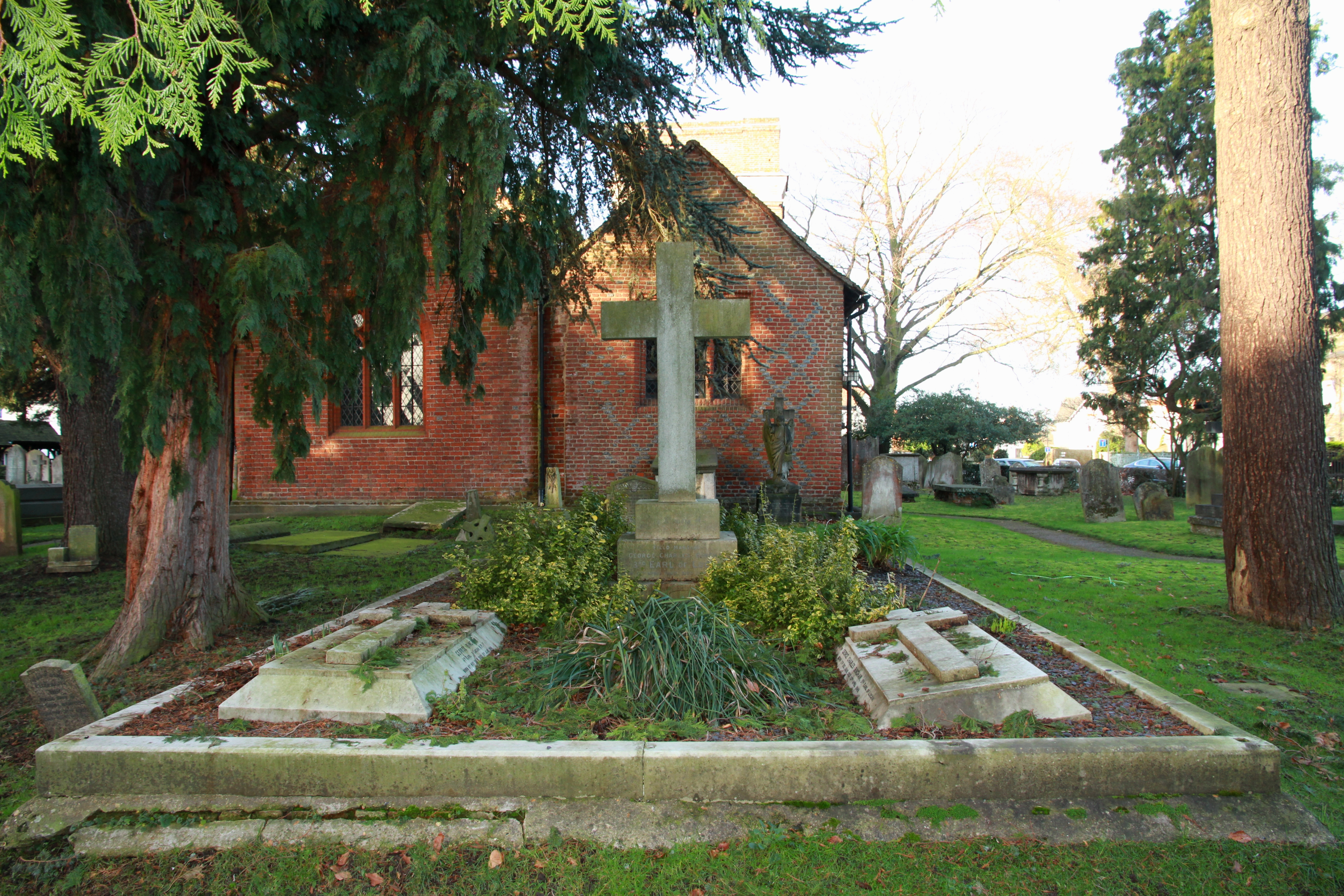
Graves of the 3rd, 4th and 5th Earls of Lucan

In 1803 Richard Bingham, 2nd Earl of Lucan bought the manor from William Lowther, 1st Earl of Lonsdale. Both Arnold and Lucan family names are prominent in All Saints' parish church, with memorials to various generations of those families. Lord Bingham, 3rd Earl of Lucan (1800–88), the Field Marshal who reluctantly passed on the order for the Charge of the Light Brigade at the Battle of Balaclava in 1854 is buried in the churchyard; along with Charles Bingham, 4th Earl of Lucan, George Bingham, 5th Earl of Lucan and their countesses.

Gabrielle Anwar, actress and star of the Fox television series Burn Notice was born in Laleham and attended Laleham C of E Primary and Middle School 1975–82.

Other notable family names are Buckland and Honor and the four houses at Laleham school are Buckland (Red), Arnold (Blue), Honor (Yellow) and Lucan (Green). The Reverend Andy Buckland was Matthew Arnold's maternal uncle; Buckland primary School in Staines was named after him.

The Reynell Baronets, originally from Devon, were substantial landowners at Laleham.

Coal and mining administrator, Alfred Robens, Baron Robens of Woldingham lived with his wife at Laleham Abbey after his retirement in 1982.

Denny Laine, and Steve Holley of the band Wings lived in Laleham in the late 1970s.

== Demography and housing ==
2011 Census Homes
Output area	Detached	Semi-detached	Terraced	Flats and apartments	Caravans/temporary/mobile homes	shared between households
Spelthorne 007A (north)	86	234	220	83	0	0
Spelthorne 009A (north-west)	163	436	23	16	0	9
Spelthorne 012A (south and Littleton west and north)	186	236	149	76	7	0

The average level of accommodation in the region composed of detached houses was 28%, the average that was apartments was 22.6%.

2011 Census Key Statistics
Output area	Population	Households	% Owned outright	% Owned with a loan	hectares
Spelthorne 007A (north)	1,537	623	34.5	38.8	71
Spelthorne 009A (north-west)	1,701	638	48.7	45.3	41
Spelthorne 012A (south and Littleton west and north)	1,544	619	39.4	38.1	421

The proportion of households in the town who owned their home outright compares to the regional average of 35.1%. The proportion who owned their home with a loan compares to the regional average of 32.5%. The remaining % is made up of rented dwellings (plus a negligible % of households living rent-free).
