= Dumsey Meadow =

Meadow in Surrey, England

Coordinates: 51.3884°N 0.4825°W

- Site of Special Scientific Interest
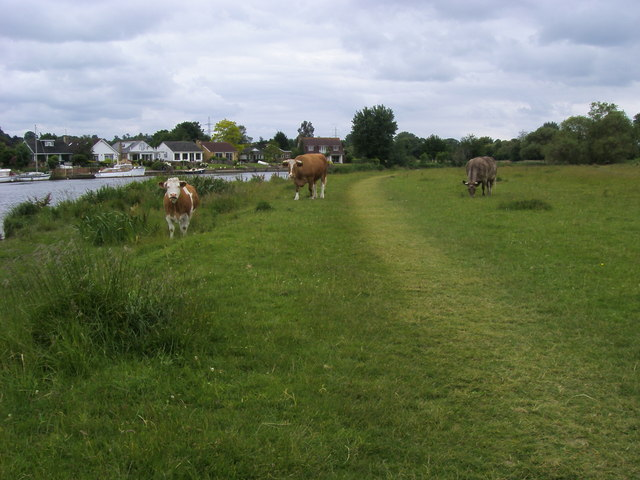
- Location of Dumsey Meadow.
- Area of search: Surrey
- Grid reference: TQ 056 665
- Interest: Biological
- Area: 9.6 hectares (24 acres)
- Notification date: 1994
- Location map: Magic Map

Dumsey Meadow is a 9.6-hectare (24-acre) biological Site of Special Scientific Interest between Chertsey and Shepperton in Surrey.

It is the only piece of undeveloped water meadow unfenced by the river remaining on the River Thames below Caversham.

This unimproved and species-rich meadow is grazed by ponies and cattle. The most common grasses are rye-grass, common bent, red fescue and Yorkshire-fog, and there are herbs such as creeping cinquefoil, ribwort plantain and lesser hawkbit.

There was formerly reference to "Dumsea Bushes", "Dumsea Corner" and "Dumsea Deep" at this point of the river, the bushes, which may have been a clump of willows, also going by the name of "Domesday Bushes".

The Chertsey and Shepperton Regatta, which has taken place for over 150 years, is held at Dumsey Meadow in July/August.

== Land ownership ==
All land within Dumsey Meadow SSSI is owned by the local authority
