= Chertsey Abbey =

Former Benedictine monastery in Surrey, England

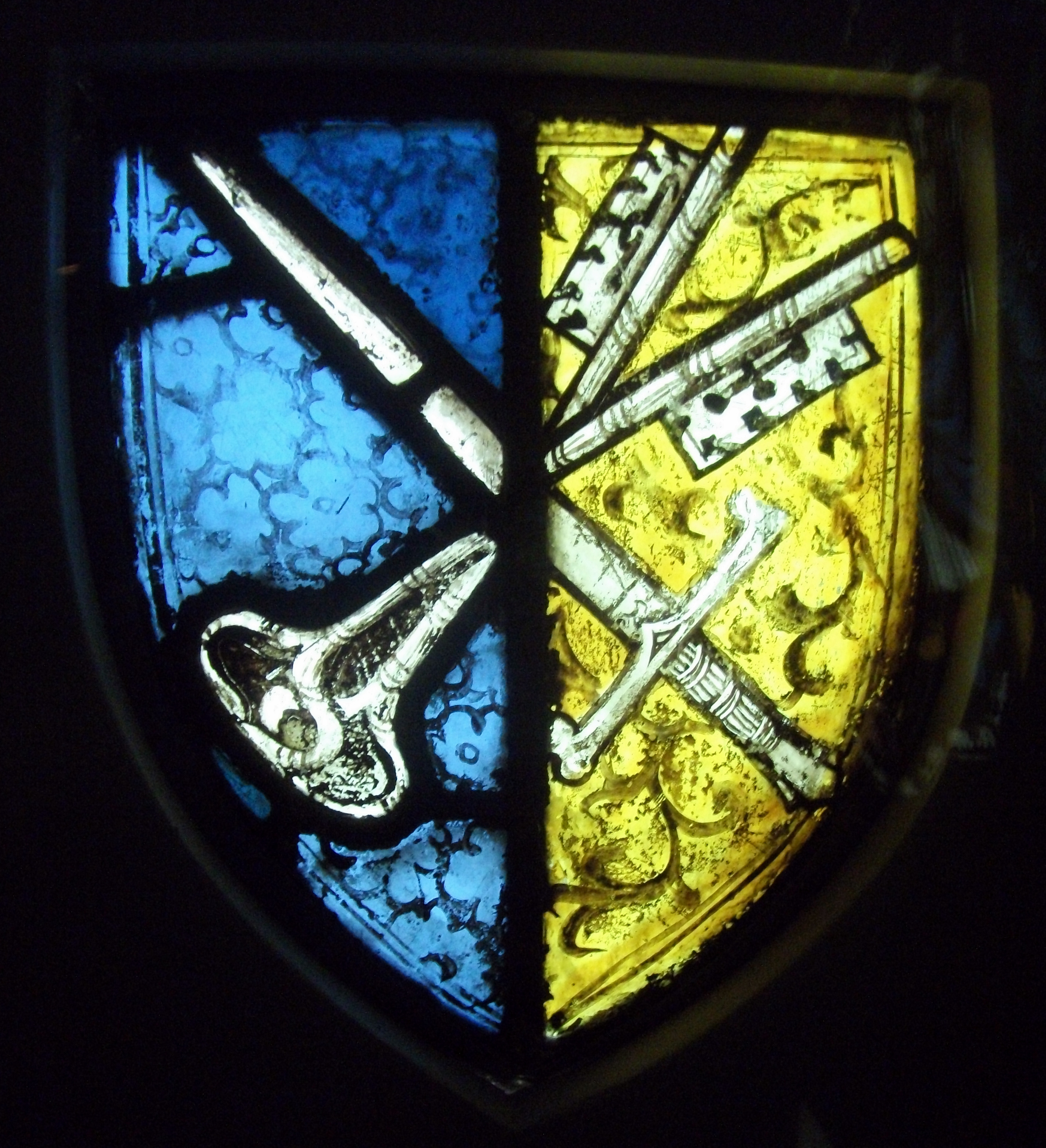
- Medieval stained glass with the arms of the abbey, a sword and the Keys of St Peter
- Interactive map of Chertsey Abbey

Monastery information
- Order: Benedictine
- Established: 666 refounded: 964
- Disestablished: 1537
- Dedication: St Peter

People
- Founder: Saint Erkenwald
- Important associated figures: King Frithuwald of Surrey; King Henry VI

Site
- Location: Chertsey, Surrey, England
- Coordinates: 51.3950°N 0.5031°W
- Visible remains: Yes
- Public access: Yes

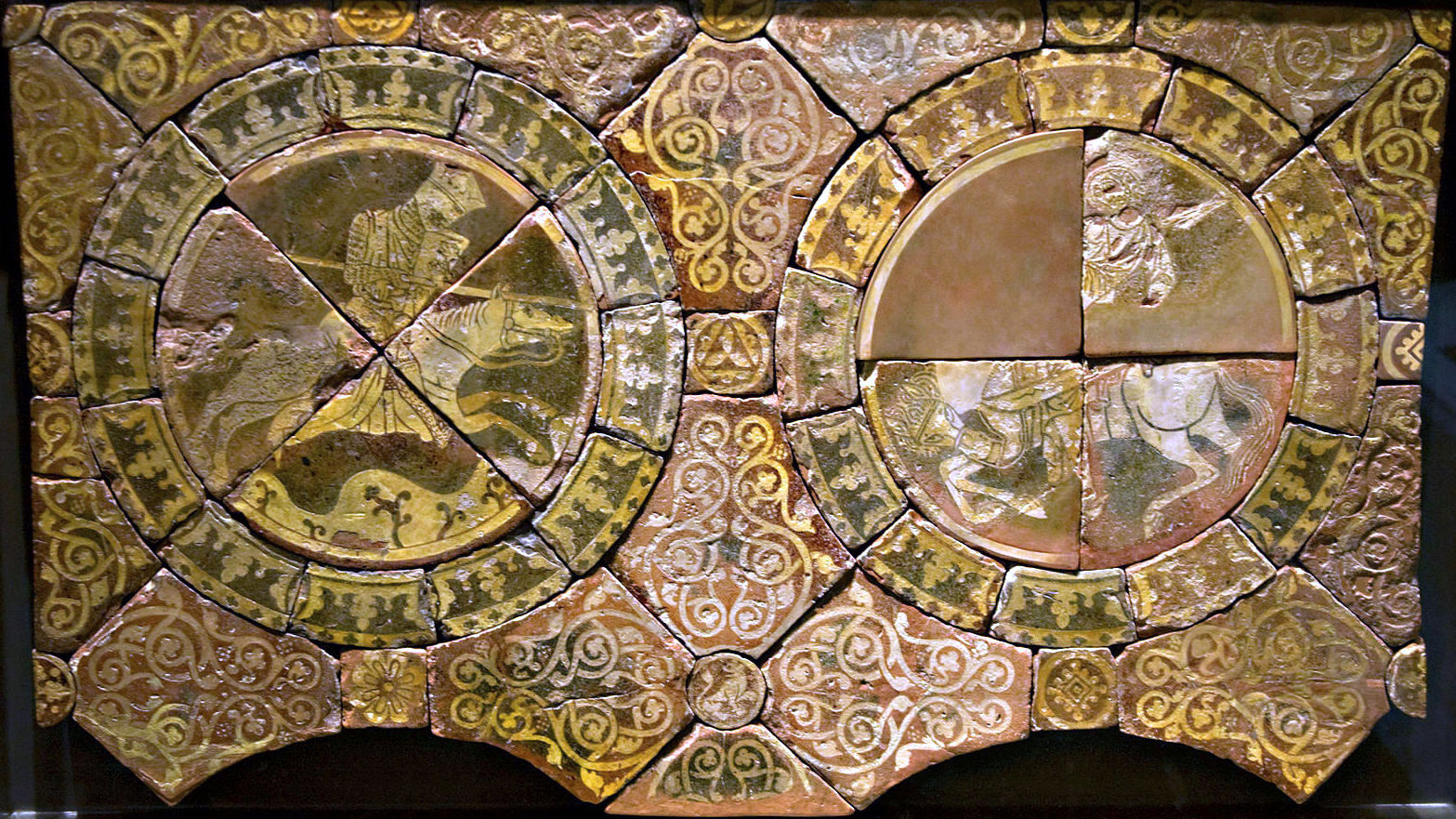
Richard I and Saladin in the British Museum tiles

Chertsey Abbey, dedicated to St Peter, was a Benedictine monastery located at Chertsey in the English county of Surrey.

It was founded in 666 AD by Saint Erkenwald who was the first abbot, and from 675 AD the Bishop of London. At the same time he founded the abbey at Chertsey, Erkenwald founded Barking Abbey on the Thames east of London, where his sister Saint Ethelburga was the first abbess.

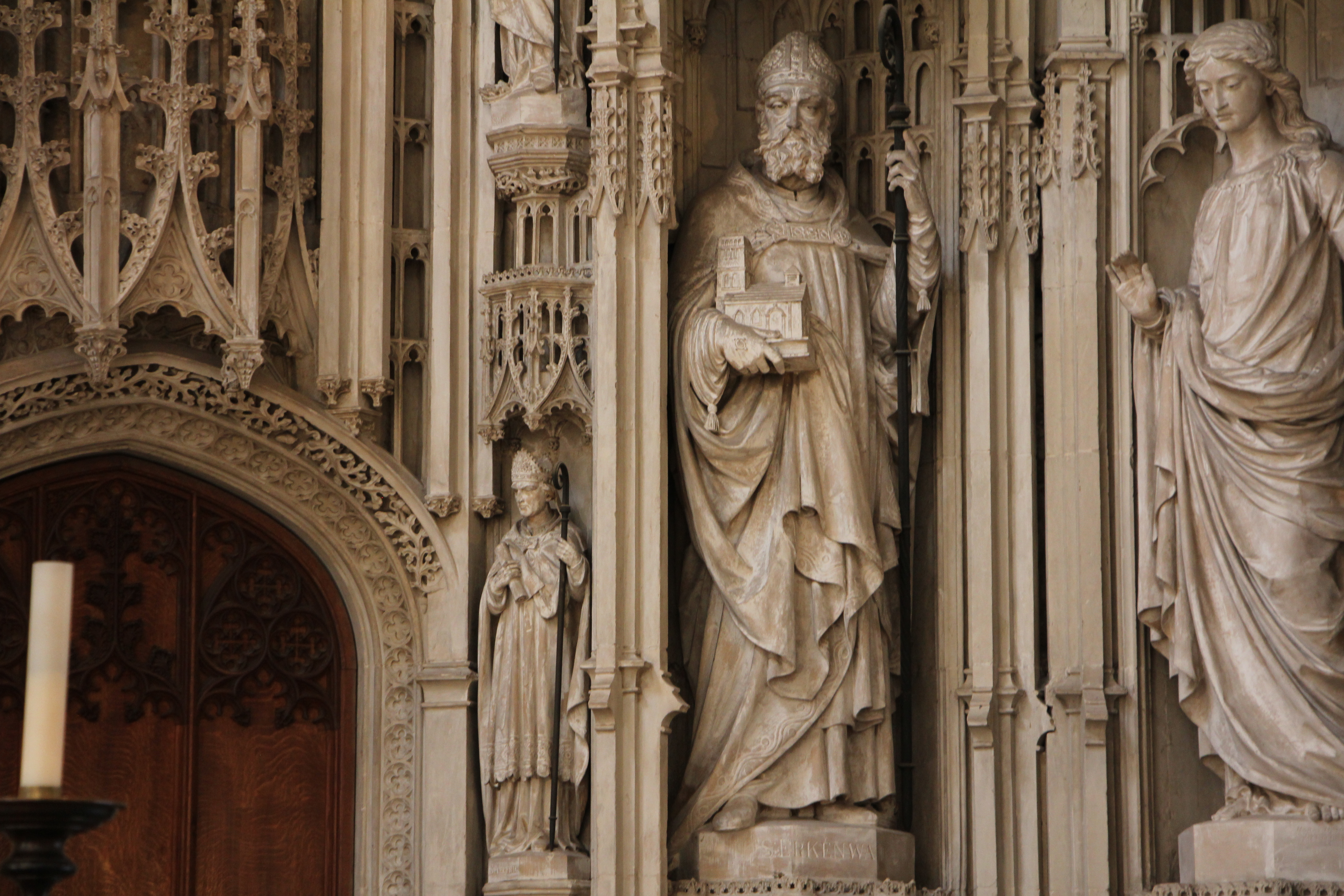
The Founder, St Erkenwald, depicted in a statue at St Albans Cathedral

In the 9th century it was sacked by the Danes. In 870, when it was attacked, many monks were killed. The abbot then was Beocca and those slain were known as Saint Beocca, Saint Ethor, and the Martyrs of Chertsey. Their deaths were recorded by William of Malmesbury. The monastery was refounded from Abingdon Abbey by King Edgar of England in 964. In the eleventh century the monks engineered the Abbey River as an offshoot of the River Thames to supply power to the abbey's watermill. In the Late Middle Ages, the Abbey became famous as the burial place of King Henry VI (whose body was later transferred to St George's Chapel, Windsor). The abbey was dissolved by the commissioners of King Henry VIII in 1537, but the community moved to Bisham Abbey in Berkshire.

== Remnants ==
The site was given to Sir William Fitzwilliam and now only slight traces remain amongst later buildings, although the abbey is remembered in many local names (for example: Abbey River, Monk's Walk, Abbey Fields). Some very fine medieval tiles from the abbey, some depicting the legend of Tristan and Iseult, may be seen in the British Museum. From the ruins of the abbey, individual letter tiles dating to the second half of the 13th century were recovered. They were assembled to form religious inscription texts on the floor and can be considered a forerunner of movable type printing.

One of the Abbey's bells, cast by a Wokingham foundry circa 1380 and weighing just over half a ton, is still in use as the 5th of the ring of eight at St Peter's church, Chertsey, and is one of the oldest bells in current use in Surrey.

A medieval stained glass panel with the abbey's coat of arms is displayed in the Burrell Collection near Glasgow, and the two crossed keys (of Saint Peter) from the arms are also in the official Banner of Arms of Surrey County Council. Some illuminated manuscripts from the abbey survive in various collections. The Chertsey Breviary, c. 1300, is in the Bodleian Library in Oxford (Bodley Ms Lat. liturg. d. 42).

Chertsey Abbey is mentioned in William Shakespeare's Richard III, Act I, Scene 2, Line 27, where Lady Anne says, "Come now towards Chertsey with your holy load", referring to the body of Henry VI.

The Worshipful Company of Haberdashers holds the advowson of St Peter's, Chertsey, nowadays.

== Later history of the site ==
After Sir William Fitzwilliam, Chertsey Abbey was owned by Dr John Hammond (c. 1555–1617), physician to the royal household under James I, who purchased the site of Chertsey Abbey in Surrey in 1602. Dr Hammond's son, Lt.Col. Thomas Hammond of Cromwell's New Model Army, was named as a Commissioner at the High Court of Justice for the trial of Charles I, and despite attending no fewer than fourteen of its sittings, he did not sign the death warrant.

In the mid-19th century the site of the abbey was excavated under the supervision of the architect and archaeologist Samuel Angell, who published an account of the investigations, accompanied by a ground plan of the abbey church, in 1862.

== Known abbots of Chertsey ==
- Erkenwald, founder and first abbot of Chertsey Abbey
- Abbot Beocca, monastery sacked 875 by Vikings
- Ordbert, 964
- Wulfwold died 1084
- Hugh II, nephew of King Stephen
- John de Rutherwyk, 1307–46
- John Corderoy, 1537

== Burials ==
- John Bourchier, 1st Baron Berners
- Abbot Beocca
- Sir Richard Berners, Knight of West Horsley

== Gallery ==
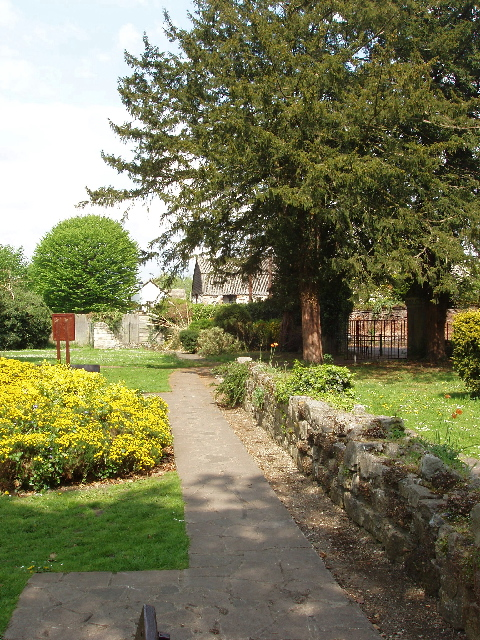
Ruined wall of Chertsey Abbey

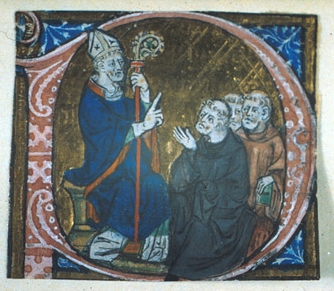
Erkenwald teaching in the Chertsey Breviary (c.1300)

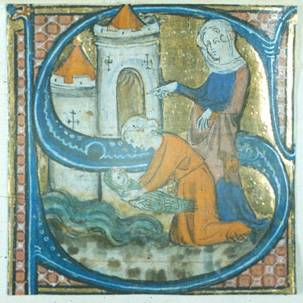
Folio 6r of the Chertsey Breviary

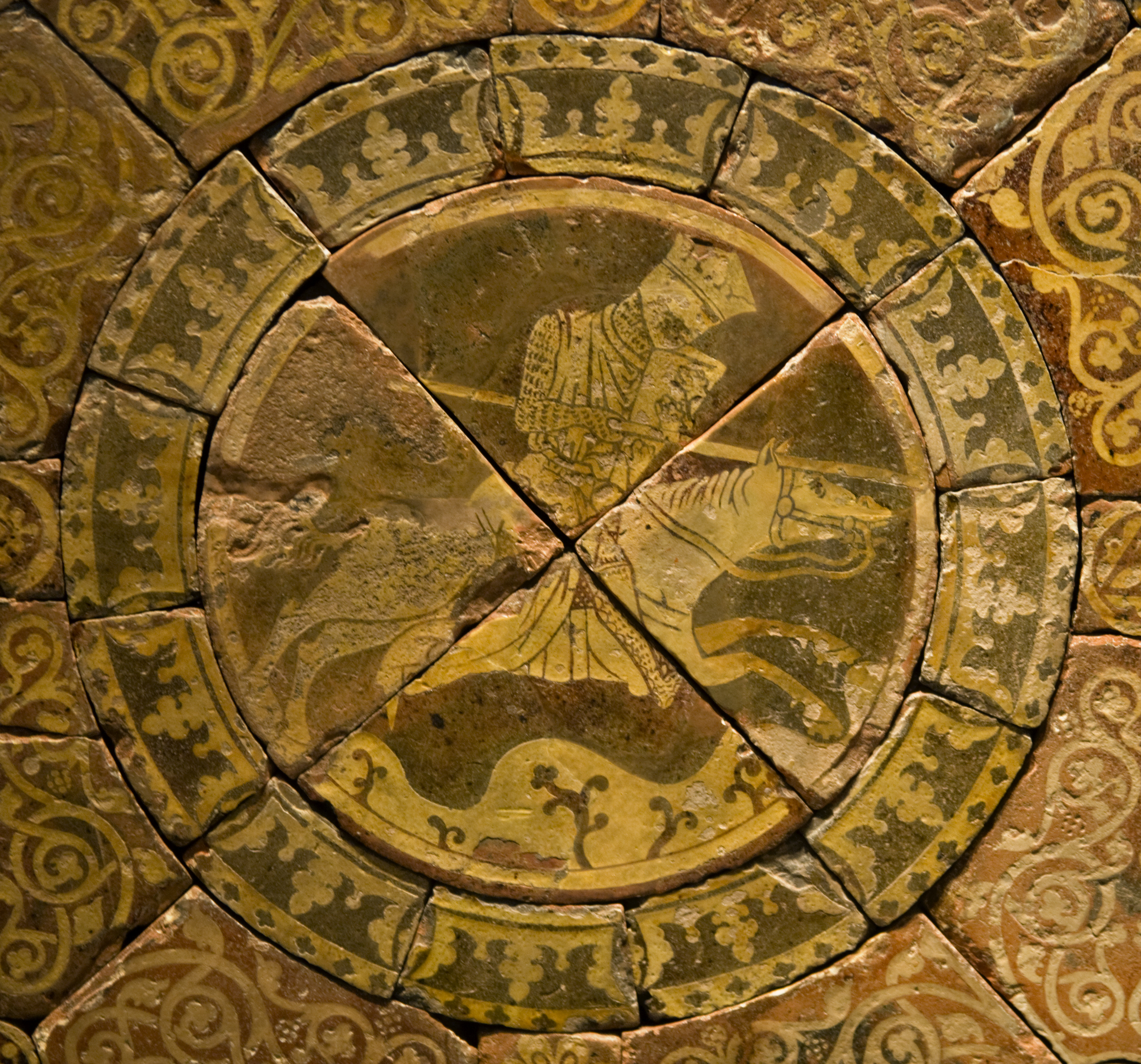
Saladin tiles in the British Museum

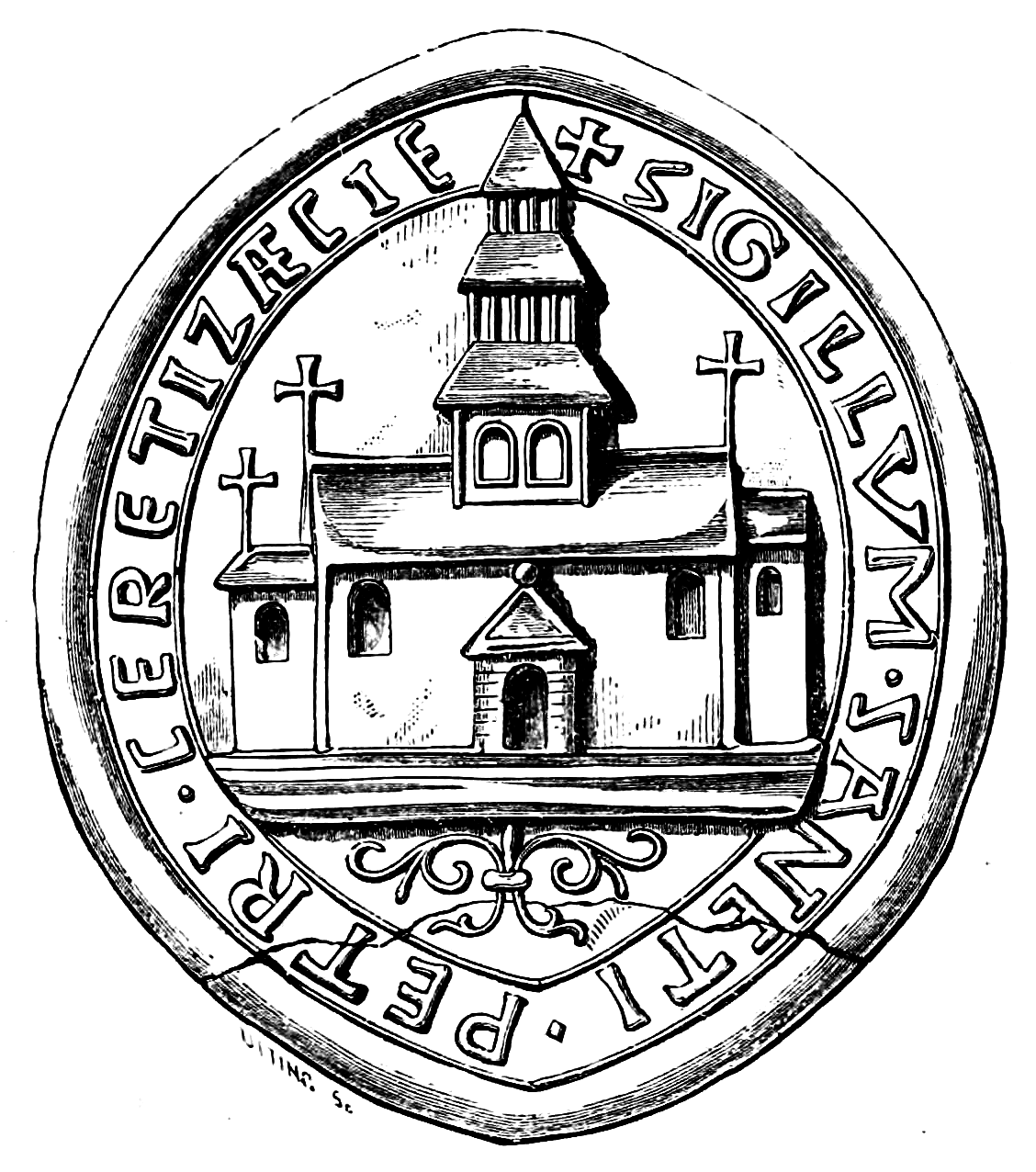
Conventual seal

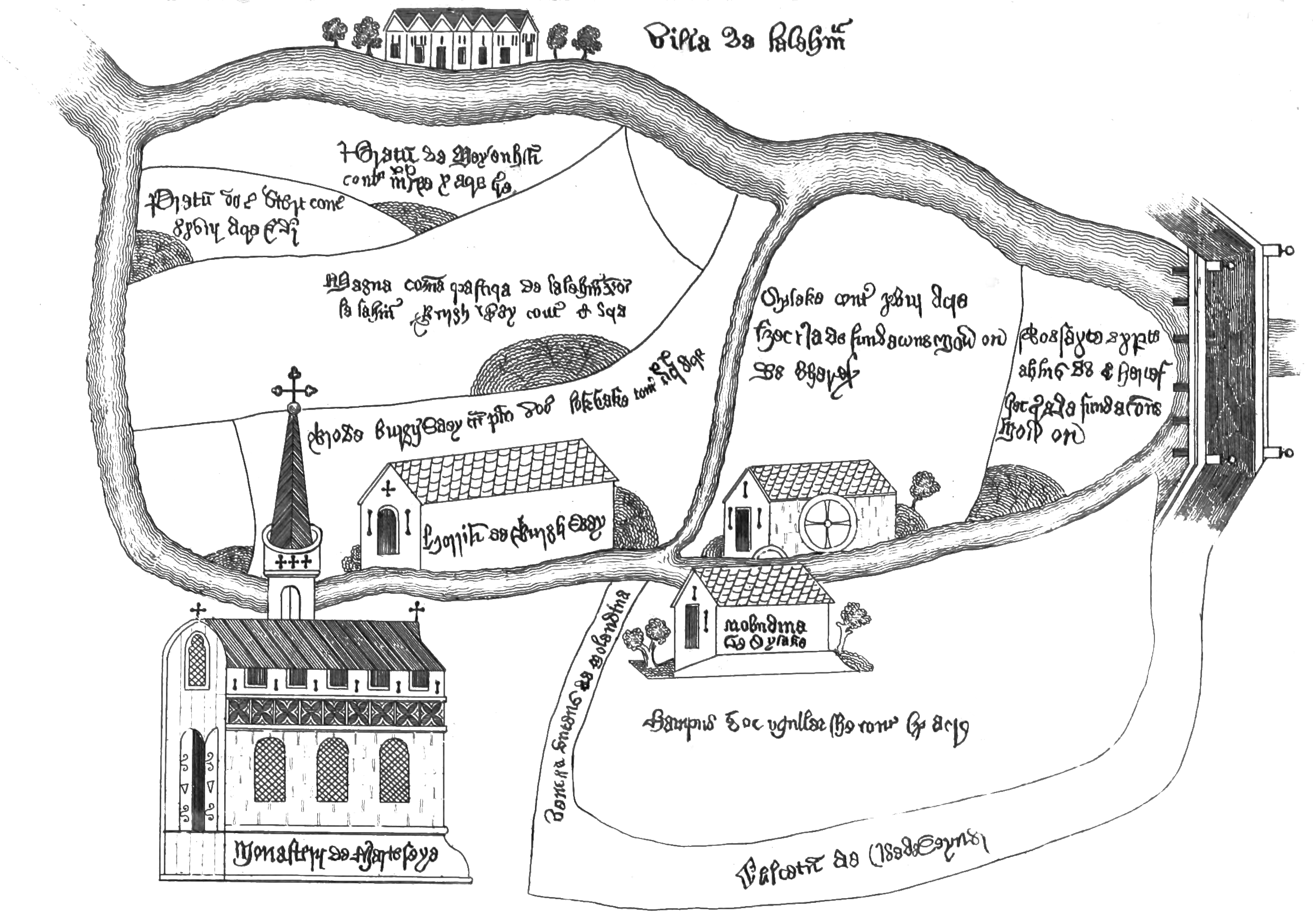
Chertsey Abbey, plan of the Demesne from the Exchequer Ledger

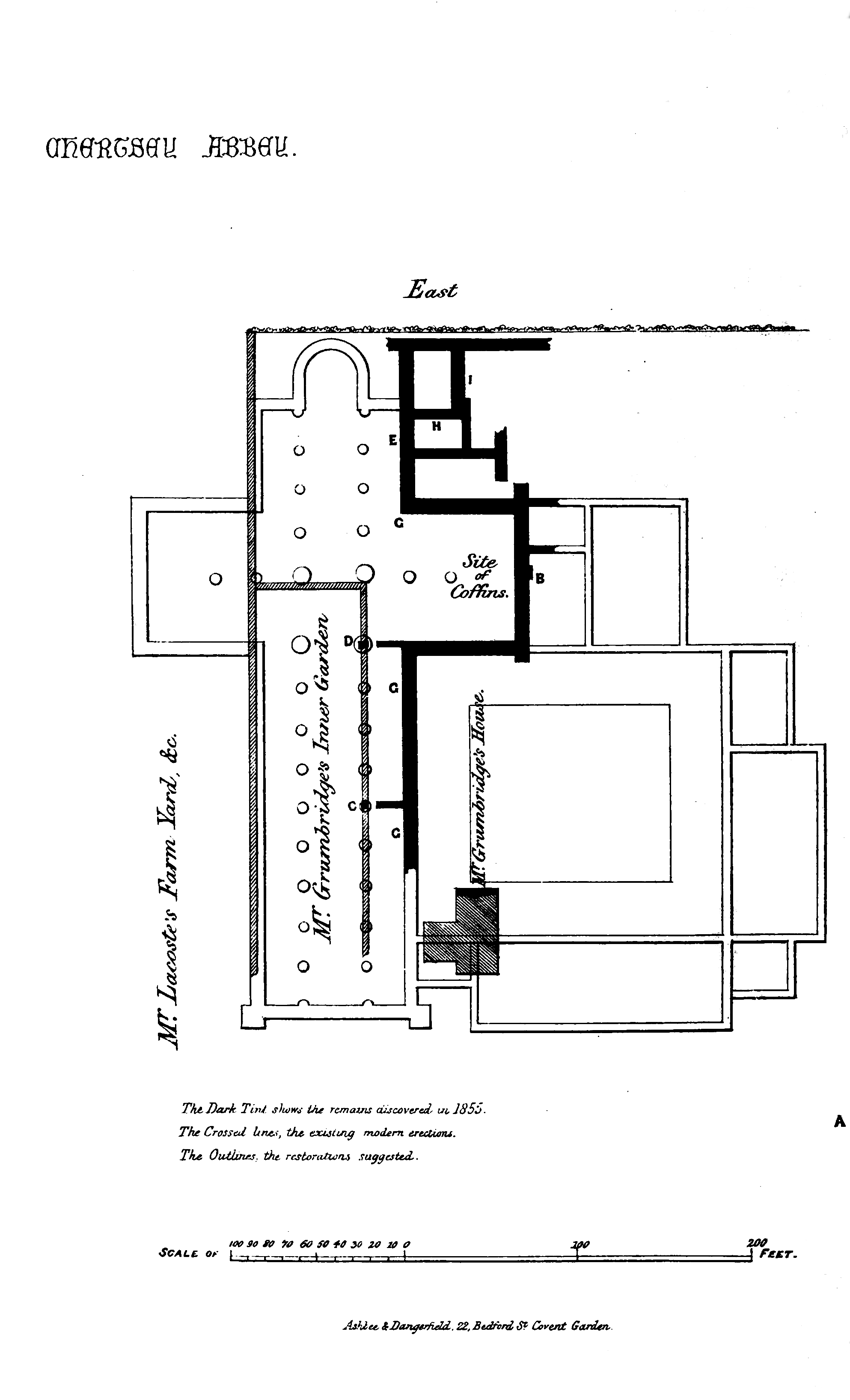
Plan of Chertsey Abbey, showing walls, &c., excavated in 1855

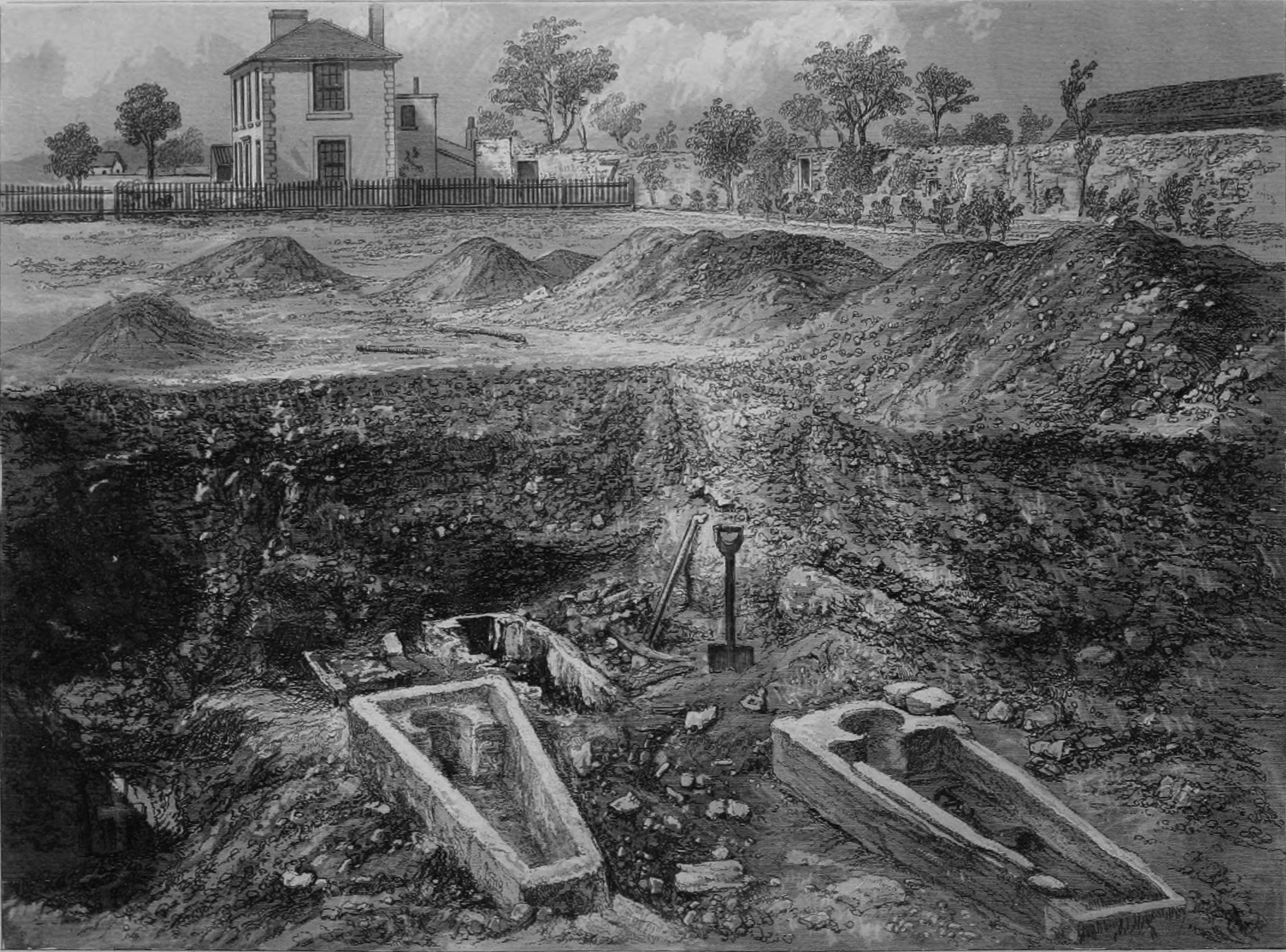
Stone coffins excavated on site of Chertsey Abbey

== Bibliography ==
- Brekle, Herbert E. (1997). Das typographische Prinzip. Versuch einer Begriffsklärung] in Gutenberg-Jahrbuch. Vol. 72. pp. 58–63.
- Lehmann-Haupt, Hellmut (1940). Englische Holzstempelalphabete des XIII. Jahrhunderts in Gutenberg-Jahrbuch. p93–97.
