= Hollyhock Island =

Island in the River Thames

Coordinates: 51°26′10.5″N 00°31′39.5″W

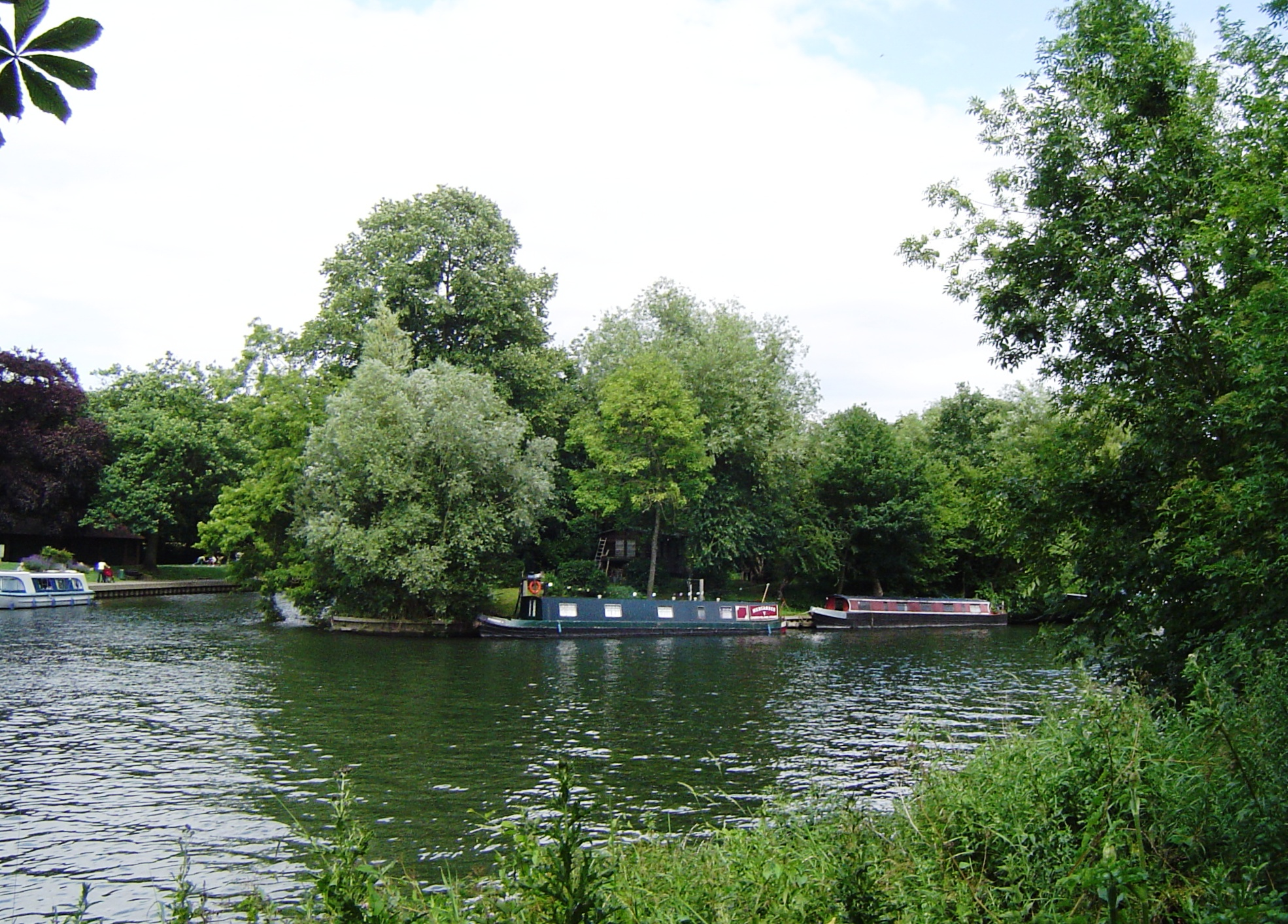
Hollyhock Island from upstream (middle distance); Holm Island (background)

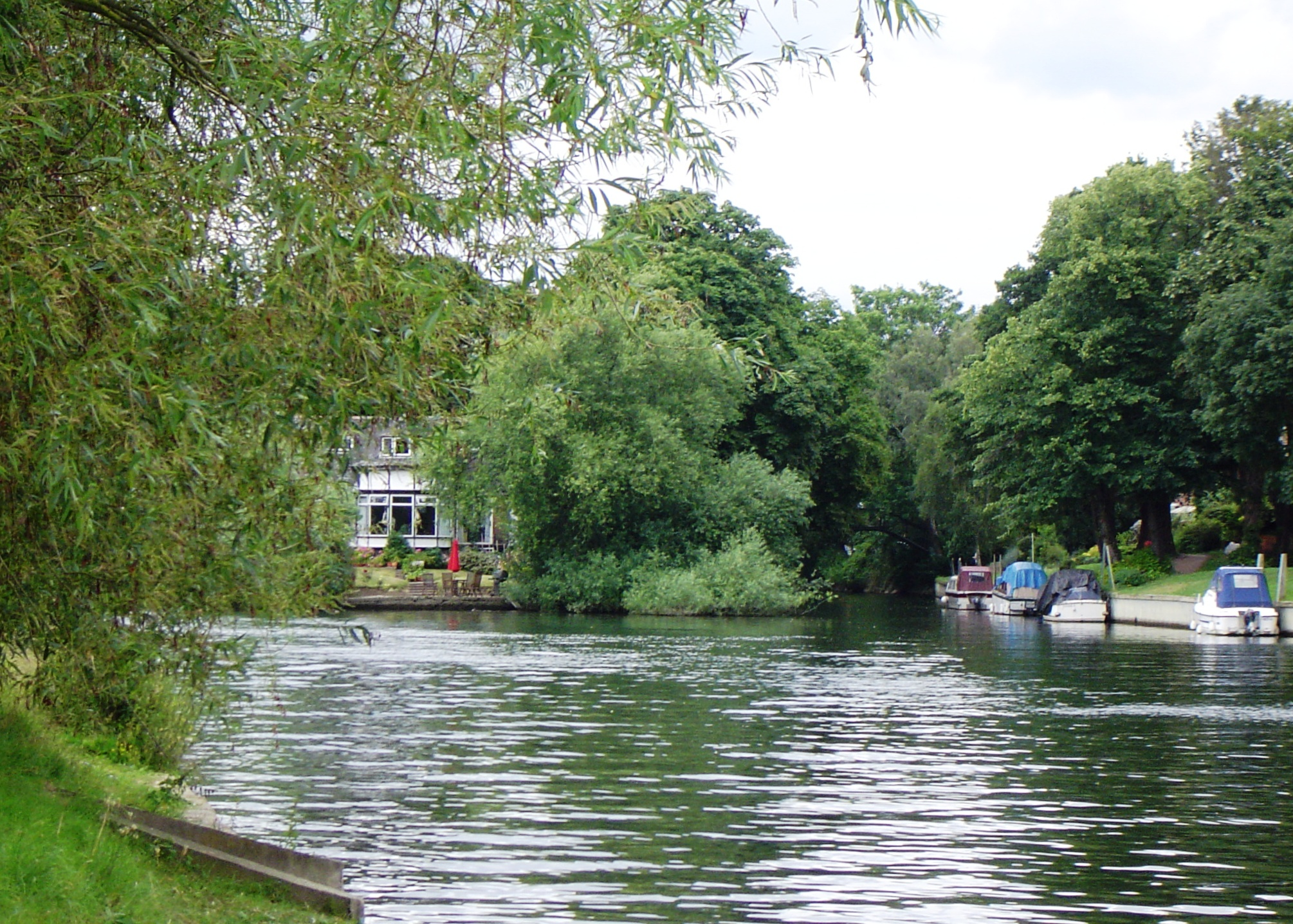
Point of Hollyhock Island from downstream (centre right)

Hollyhock Island is an inhabited island in the River Thames in England located between Bell Weir Lock and Penton Hook Lock.

== Location ==
The island is situated in a small channel between the larger Holm Island and the north bank of the River Thames. It is located in Berkshire, within the Royal Borough of Windsor and Maidenhead, near the county boundary with Surrey. Before county boundary changes in 1974, the island was part of Buckinghamshire and near the border with Middlesex. The island is approximately 80 miles (130 km) from the Thames Estuary at the Isle of Grain.

Upstream of the island is Runnymede Bridge, which carries the M25 motorway. Downstream are Church Island and Staines Bridge. The island is located between Bell Weir Lock and Penton Hook Lock.

The 25-inch scale Ordnance Survey Great Britain County Series map, published in the 1890s, shows that the island was connected to both the north bank and Holm Island by footbridges. By the time of the 1962 25-inch Ordnance Survey map, these footbridges no longer existed.

== Use ==
On the island was "The Nest", a house allegedly used by the future king Edward VIII and Wallis Simpson as a romantic getaway. (Note: Some sources state that The Nest is situated on the adjacent (and connected) Holm Island) Current Ordnance Survey mapping shows no buildings on the island and no connection to the mainland.

In August 2025 it was marketed for sale along with neighbouring Holm Island as a single lot.

== See also ==
- Islands in the River Thames

== Footnotes ==
Next island upstream	River Thames	Next island downstream
The Island, Hythe End	Hollyhock Island; Holm Island; Grid reference TQ02457181	Church Island
