= Staines Boat Club =

British rowing club

Coordinates: 51.4310°N 0.5130°W

- Location: 28 Riverside Drive, Egham Hythe, Staines-upon-Thames, TW18 3JN, Surrey, England
- Home water: Staines-upon-Thames Reach (water above Penton Hook Lock), River Thames
- Founded: 1869
- Affiliations: British Rowing boat code - STN
- Website: www.stainesboatclub.co.uk

Events
- Staines Regatta

Staines Boat Club is a rowing club between Penton Hook Lock and Bell Weir Lock on the River Thames in England, located next to the Hythe spur of the Thames Path in Egham Hythe, historically also known as Staines hythe, the last word meaning small harbour or river harbour.

== Location and amenities ==
The club and boat house is on the southern bank of the river at Egham Hythe (its electoral ward and parish), close to the Swan Inn on what was a series of three small islands of Staines-upon-Thames before 1754 and remains its post town, it is adjoined by a spur of the Thames Path, the Hythe towpath, through the small riverside conservation area which is connected to the Runnymede towpath, north-west and Staines Bridge which connects it to the Spelthorne towpath, south. It has a small parking and trailer area of hardstanding. The club has a range of regularly updated and improved charitable amenities including boathouses, a large seating area and hire venue.

== History ==
The club was founded in 1869 although a Staines Boating Club is recorded as racing in 1867.

It was first listed in the Rowing Almanac as racing in that season. The club was established with select membership criteria, restricted to men in 'professional occupations' and preferably having already learnt to row at a school. The Rowing Almanac has been published every year since 1860. Staines Boat Club first appeared in the Almanac in 1870 which recorded the results of the 1869 season and the club appears in every Rowing Almanac since.

Since 1909 its oarsmen and women may be invited to join the social Remenham Club which entitles its members and their guests to take part in the only such spectator venue with a clubhouse at Henley Royal Regatta, adjoined by a mound and a large exclusive grass lawn enclosure. Remenham membership is limited to some of the older rowing clubs along the river.

Its boathouse formally reopened in May 2022 after renovations.

== Honours ==
=== British champions ===
Year	Winning crew/s
1977	Men L1x
1981	Men L2x
1983	Women 2x
1987	Women 4x
1992	Women 2x, Women 4+, Women L2x
1993	Women 4+
1996	Women 4-, Women 8+
2005	Women L4-

== See also ==
- Rowing on the River Thames
