= Friday Island, River Thames =

Island in the River Thames in Berkshire, United Kingdom

Coordinates: 51.4625°N 0.5693°W

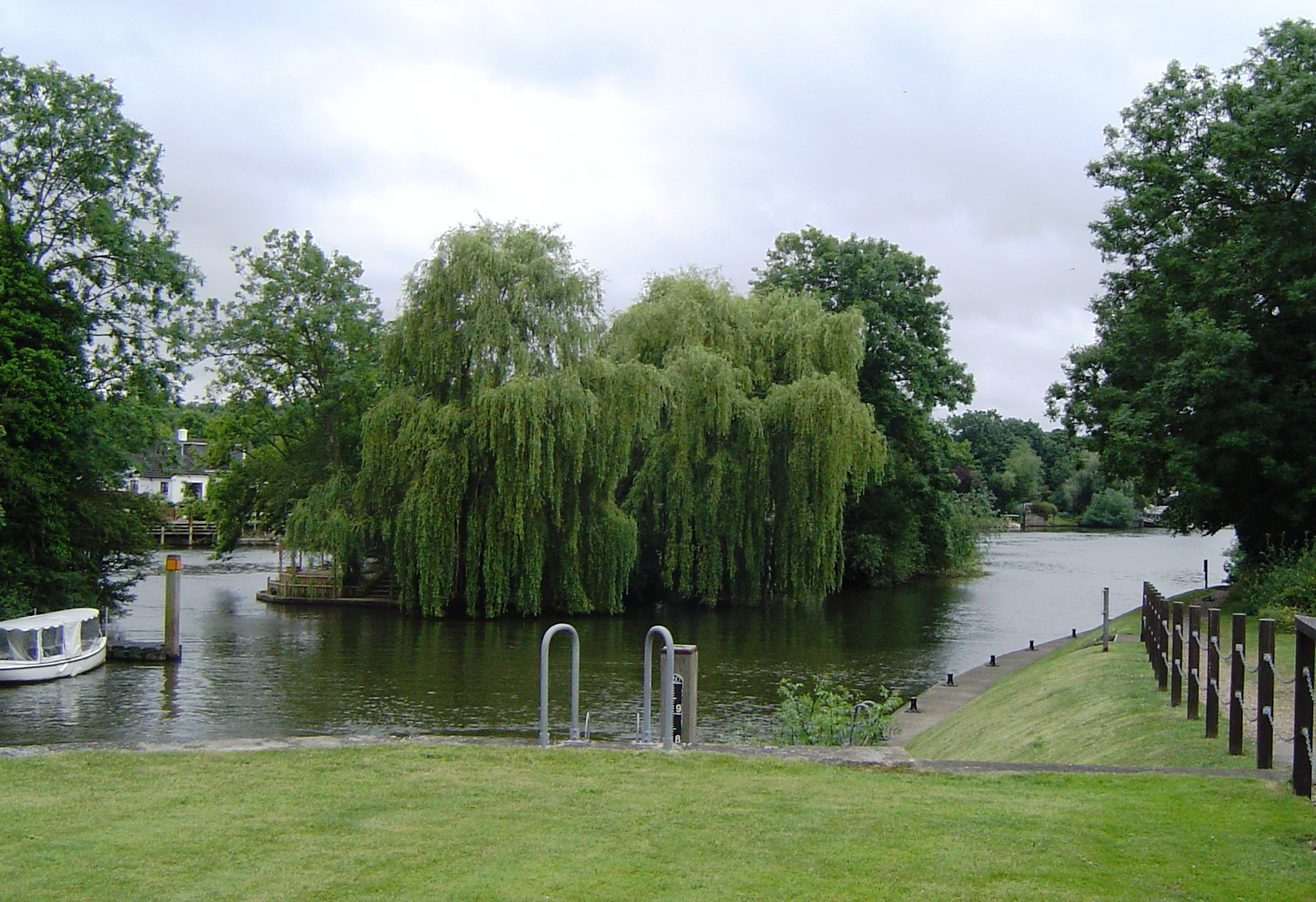
Friday Island from Old Windsor Lock

Map showing the location of Friday Island within Berkshire.

Friday Island is an island in the River Thames in England at Old Windsor, Berkshire. It is on the reach above Bell Weir Lock, just short of Old Windsor Lock.

== Secluded ==
The small island, whose shape is said to resemble the footprint of Man Friday in Daniel Defoe's 1719 novel Robinson Crusoe, contains a two-bedroom cottage with a well, almost hidden by willow trees. This was the home of Dr Julius Grant, the forensic scientist, from 1966 until his death in 1991. He was noted, among other detection, for proving in 1984 that the Hitler Diaries published in the Sunday Times were forgeries, despite an endorsement of their authenticity from the historian Hugh Trevor-Roper. The lock keeper recalled Dr Grant saying that when he went to the island, he felt it was like going a million miles away. It was like owning half of Australia, it was so secluded.

== See also ==
- Islands in the River Thames

Next island upstream	River Thames	Next island downstream
Ham Island	Friday Island	Friary Island
