= Church Island, River Thames =

Inhabited island in Surrey, England

Coordinates: 51°26′06″N 00°31′12″W

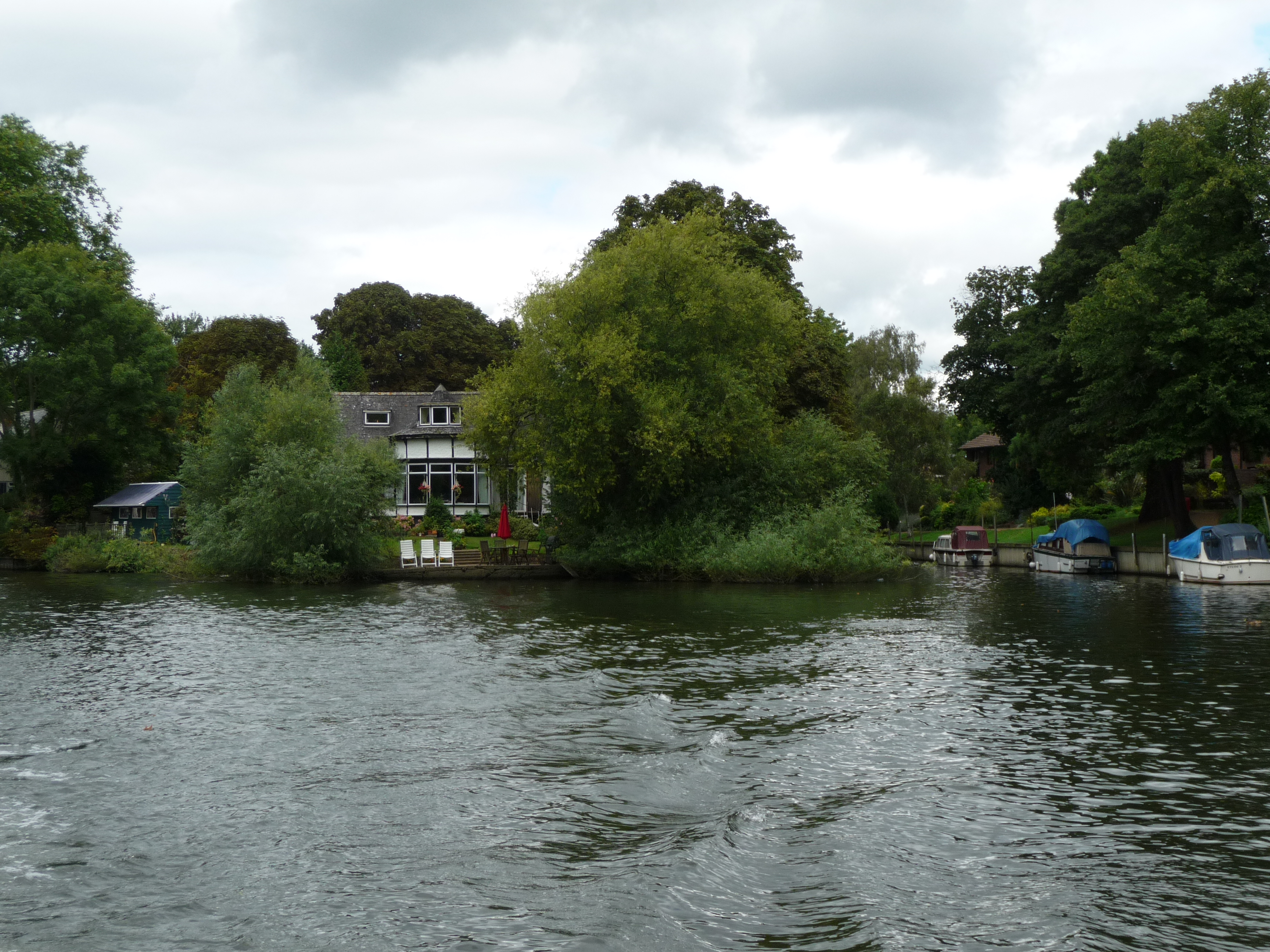
One tail of Church Island

Church Island or Church Eyot is an inhabited island in the River Thames in England on the reach above Penton Hook Lock in Staines-upon-Thames, Spelthorne, Surrey. It is in the upper part of the reach. It is approximately 200 m (660 ft) above Staines Bridge, but is thought by some historians to have been the site of the Roman bridges (Pontes) across the Thames recorded as a waypoint on the Devil's Highway between Londinium (London) and Calleva (Silchester).

== Geography ==
This inhabited islet connects by a footbridge to Church Street, Staines, adjoining The Lammas recreation ground and mini-golf course and 100m below the oldest of the town's three Anglican churches, a Grade II* medieval structure. St. Mary's Church is on a small rise, elevated 5 metres above river level, and 21 metres above sea level, as such, from its steeple the island is visible. The island is 100m long and almost triangular, and rises no more than 1 metre above river level. The narrow channel between the island and north bank (backwater) forms a small oxbow away from the course of the river.

The island is in the upper part of the reach which has a WNW/ESE axis above Staines Railway Bridge and different, north–south axis below that bridge. Staines Bridge is 200m downstream.

== History ==
=== Roman ===
Roman itineraries note that a point around Staines was the location of Ad Pontes (Latin for "Bridgeside" or "[City] by the Bridges"), a waypoint on the Devil's Highway between Londinium (London) and Calleva (Silchester). With evidence of architectural discoveries in the 19th century leading towards the island from the present town centre, a local historian of the Victorian period surmised that two Roman bridges crossed each of the town's rivers: the Colne and then the Thames at Church Island. Alternatively, the bridge may have been across another island. A county history of Susan Reynolds (1962) says Egham Hythe had a larger island than Church Eyot directly across Staines Bridge in 1754, which remained until the early 20th century. Its backwater must have been removed and little or no trace of that island remains in terms of land elevation.

=== Subsequent ===
The island has not always been the largest in Staines and Egham. A larger island was by Staines Bridge on the Egham side until 1754. Washed-away islands (or islands made part of the agricultural banks adjoining) existed in the Colne and streams in Staines during the medieval period.

== See also ==
- Islands in the River Thames

Next island upstream	River Thames	Next island downstream
Hollyhock Island & Holm Island	Church Island	Truss's Island
