= Staines Amateur Regatta =

Staines Amateur Regatta is an English rowing regatta which takes place between Staines-upon-Thames and Silvery Sands on the River Thames on the reach above Penton Hook Lock.

== History ==
Staines Amateur Regatta was established in 1850 one year before Staines Boat Club. It was initially a great rowing function, but had been allowed to drop until revived by Percival Clarke, the son of Sir Edward Clarke, in the 1890s. In 1897 it was noted that a Staines eight had won for the first time, in a meeting made up of "quality not quantity", and that a new Challenge Cup, nearly three feet high was won by London Rowing Club.

== Organisation ==
The regatta takes place in the 4th weekend in July and attracts top crews from around the UK. The regatta currently takes place on the 500-metre downstream course from St Peter's Church until 'Silvery Sands'. The regatta is launch umpired.

Whilst the regatta and boat club are two different organisations, Staines Boat Club members now act as volunteers in running the regatta. The regatta itself has run in several different guises, including a longer 1500m, and 1000m course - currently it is a "sprint" regatta at 500m.

== See also ==
- Rowing on the River Thames
