= Maidie Scott =

Irish singer

- Signed promotional photo
- Born: Mary Elizabeth Pim; 21 September 1881; Mountmellick, Queen's County, Ireland
- Died: 28 July 1966 (aged 84); Durban, South Africa
- Occupations: Singer, Comedienne
- Years active: 1900-1927
- Spouse: John Francis Macgregor
- Children: Twins; Mary Diana Macgregor and John Macgregor (John was an air gunner during WW 11. His aircraft was shot down over Italy, he is buried in Italy)
- Relatives: Surviving grandchildren Bridget Hancock and Christopher Robinson, children of Mary Diana. Surviving grandchildren, great grandchildren reside in South Africa and the UK

Maidie Scott (born Mary Elizabeth Pim; 21 September 1881 – 28 July 1966) was an Irish-born singer, comedienne and music hall performer.

== Life and career ==
She was born in Mountmellick, Queen's County, Ireland, and moved with her parents and siblings to Manchester, England, when she was a child. She soon began touring as a stage performer, and under the name Madie Doris Pim married Alfred Scott Dodd in 1900.

By 1904, she was known professionally as Maidie Scott. One reviewer in Leeds described her performance that year in the musical comedy The Girl from Japan as: "delightfully dainty and demure... [She] holds the hearts of all the male members of the audience in willing thralldom... Her songs... are rendered with vocal skill and sweetness which make an audience turbulent for encores... [As a dancer] her marked originality, graceful and artistic movements proclaim her as an artiste of high attainments."

Her popularity extended to the United States, where she made her first appearance in 1908. Among her most successful songs were "Everybody Works But Father" (first published in 1905), "The Bird on Nellie's Hat" (1907), "If the Wind Had Only Blown the Other Way" (1909), and "If the Managers Only Thought the Same as Mother" (1910). The writer W. L. George, in A London Mosaic: London in the early 1900s, described Scott as "the most finished product on the music-halls of today".

In 1913, she and her husband, a variety agent, divorced in a well-publicised case. She married John Francis MacGregor, a stockbroker, and lived on Magna Carta Island in the River Thames at Runnymede. She remained a popular performer, appearing with Gaby Deslys in revue in 1915, when she was described as "one of the daintiest, cleverest, and most winsome comediennes on the stage". She also recorded several of her most popular songs, for the Zonophone label in 1912, and His Master's Voice in 1915. After having two children, she continued to tour, and in Australia in 1925 was described as one of "the small coterie of vaudeville 'stars' whose name is well known outside the Old Country."

Following a second divorce, she married Noel Robertson in 1927. She retired from the stage, and the couple emigrated to the Union of South Africa. Her husband died in 1960, and she died in Durban in 1966, aged 84.
