= The Island, Hythe End =

Island in the River Thames in Hythe End, Berkshire, England

Coordinates: 51°26′31″N 0°32′49″W

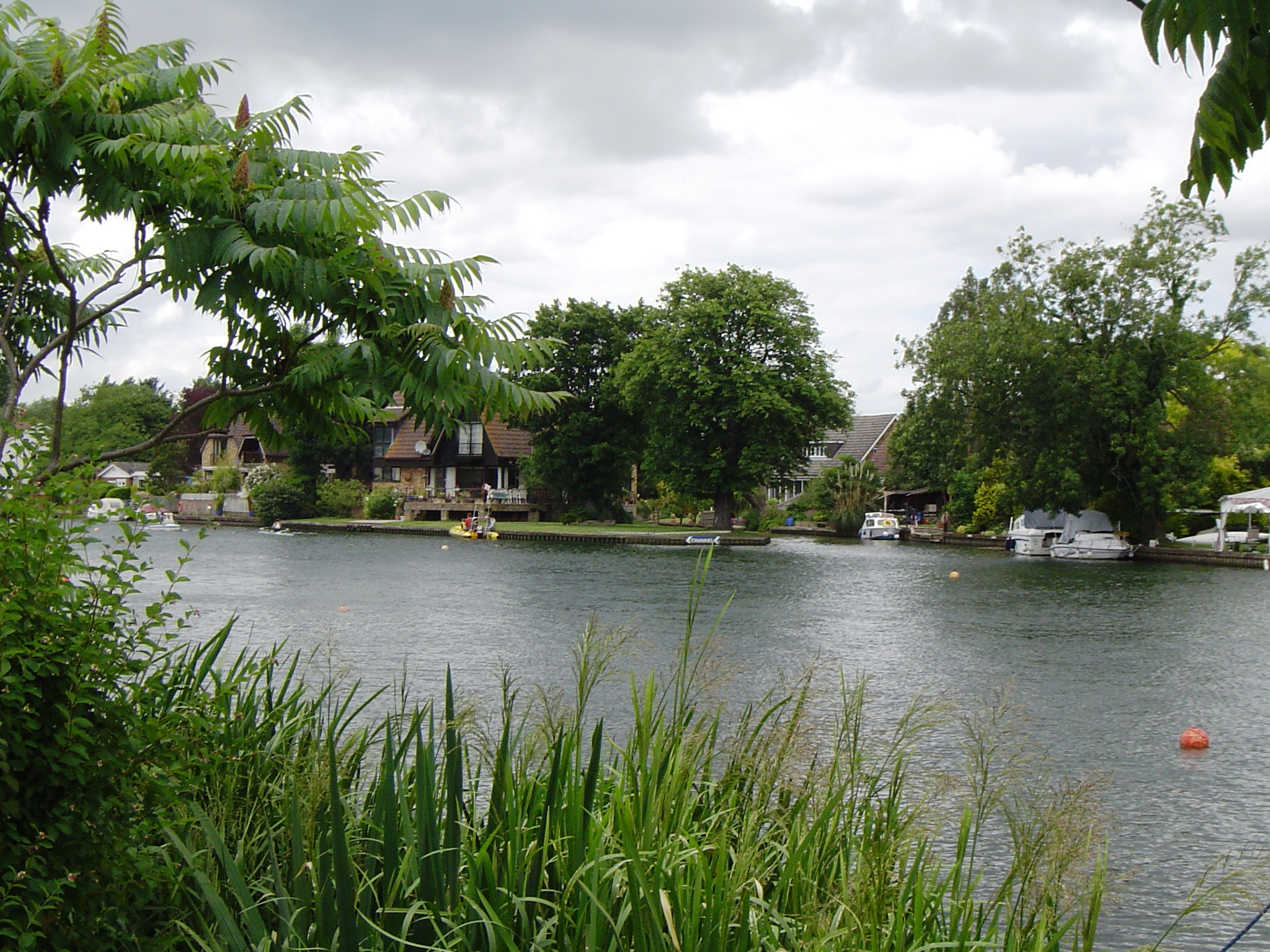
Hythe End Island from downstream

The Island is an inhabited island in the River Thames in England on the reach above Bell Weir Lock, a part of the Hythe End part of Wraysbury village and civil parish, Berkshire. It is connected to that side of the river and although part of Berkshire was, like the village, part of Buckinghamshire before 1974.

The Island lies alongside the course of Egham Regatta.

== See also ==
- Islands in the River Thames

Next island upstream	River Thames	Next island downstream
Magna Carta Island	The Island, Hythe End	Hollyhock Island; Holm Island
