= Julius Grant =

British forensic scientist

Julius Grant (born Julius Gottheimer; 19 October 1901 – 5 July 1991) was a British forensic scientist and intelligence officer, considered one of the 20th century’s leading experts on forensics.

== Biography ==
He was born in Dalston, London, the son of David Gottheimer and Minnie Mikah Gottheimer, and brother of Solomon Gottheimer. In 1926, he married "Lena" Levy (dec. 1956), raising a son and a daughter, followed later by a second marriage.

Grant made a career exposing forgeries on the basis of chemical analysis of paper, ink and other characteristics of written documents. Much of his work was for British Intelligence, as illustrated in the Colin Wallace Clockwork Orange investigation. Well into his retirement, Grant was called in to investigate possible forgery and to give expert evidence in court. In 1983, Grant's analysis of the Hitler Diaries confirmed within a week that they were forgeries. He was also called as a witness in the war crimes trial of alleged Nazi collaborator John Demjanjuk.

Grant lived for many of his later years on Friday Island one of the islands in the River Thames. The lock keeper at Old Windsor Lock nearby recalled Dr Grant saying that when he went to the island, he felt it was like “going a million miles away. It was like owning half of Australia, it was so secluded.”

In the fictionalized 'autobiography' of a former serving officer of Her Majesty's Intelligence Service, "Friends" Secret Intelligence Service MI6, the novelist, convicted fraudster and Zionist agent, Michael John O'Hara (aka Zeev Gideon Korwan), wrote, "Julius Grant to me and indeed to many law enforcement officers worldwide was arguably the world's most respected forensic scientist in his particular area of expertise. I liked the man personally and he I".
