= Magna Carta Island =

Island in the River Thames, England

Coordinates: 51.4462°N 0.5629°W

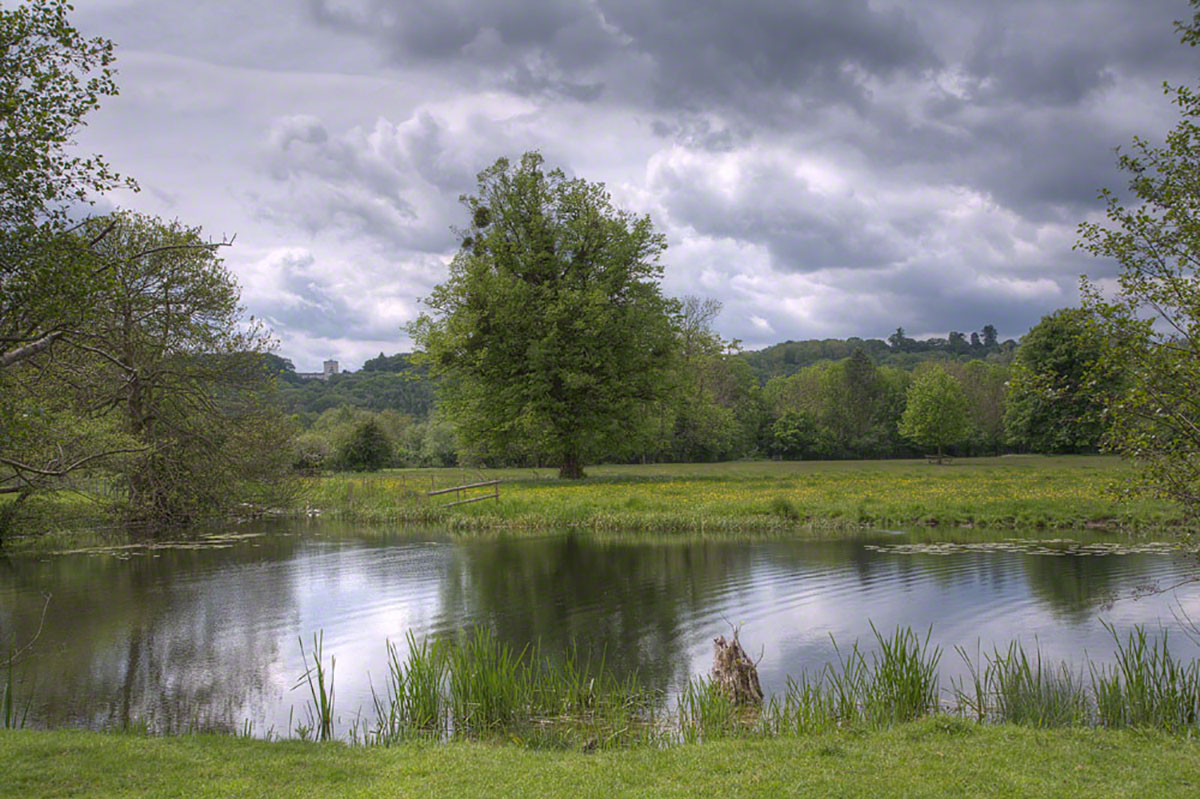
View of Magna Carta Island from the North bank of the Thames

Magna Carta Island

Magna Carta Island is an ait in the River Thames in England, on the reach above Bell Weir Lock. It is in Berkshire facing water-meadows forming Runnymede. Its civil and ecclesiastical parish is Wraysbury so it was transferred from Buckinghamshire to Berkshire in 1974.

== History ==
The island is a contender for being the place where, in 1215, King John sealed Magna Carta. Whilst the charter itself indicates Runnymede by name, it is possible the island may have been considered part of Runnymede at the time. It is known that in 1217 the island was the meeting-place of Henry III and Louis (later Louis VIII) of France.

The island is the site of a large house, known as Magna Carta House, built in 1834 in a pseudo-Norman style by George Simon Harcourt, the High Sheriff of Buckinghamshire and later Member of Parliament. Within the house there is still a large inscribed stone that Harcourt installed to commemorate the signing of the Magna Carta. The house had large extensions built in the early 20th century and is now Grade II listed. In the early 1920s the island was owned by a stockbroker, J. F. MacGregor, and his wife, the music hall performer Maidie Scott.

In the 1930s, the house was owned by the industrialist and Member of Parliament Patrick Hannon. His wife hosted parties there with prominent guests, such as Prime Minister of Australia Joseph Lyons; Anne Chamberlain, the wife of the British Prime Minister; and foreign ambassadors. The grounds were also sometimes open to the public, and garden parties were held for the participants in the annual swan upping ceremony.

Hannon eventually gave the property to Buckinghamshire County Council, who rented it to a series of tenants before selling it in 1967. In the grounds of the house there is a walnut tree planted by Elizabeth II in October 1974.

In 2014, the house and island were offered for sale by the son of the couple who bought them in 1967. The property was again for sale in 2021 for £4.1 million.

== In literature ==
The island is mentioned in chapter 12 of Jerome K. Jerome's 1889 humorous novel Three Men in a Boat:

We went over to Magna Charta Island, and had a look at the stone which stands in the cottage there and on which the great Charter is said to have been signed; though, as to whether it really was signed there, or, as some say, on the other bank at “Runningmede,” I decline to commit myself.

== See also ==
- Islands in the River Thames

Next island upstream	River Thames	Next island downstream
Pats Croft Eyot	Magna Carta Island	The Island, Hythe End
