= Penton Hook Lock =

Lock on the River Thames in Surrey, England

Coordinates: 51°24′53″N 0°30′01″W

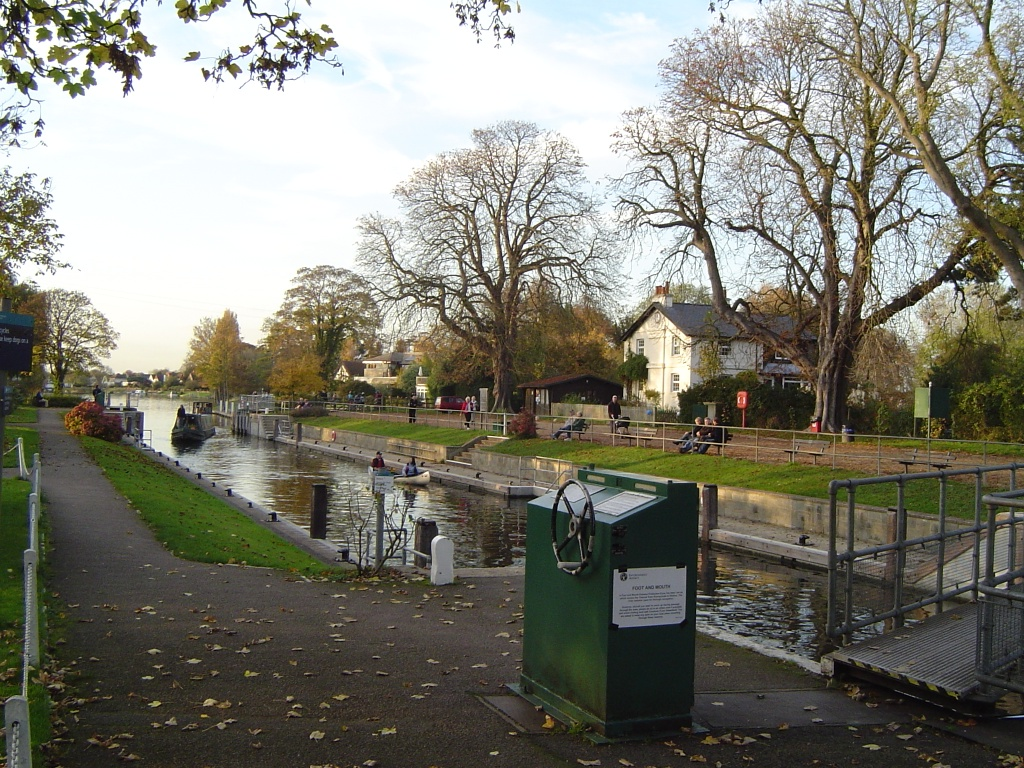
- Penton Hook Lock with the lock-keeper's house
- Waterway: River Thames
- County: Surrey (historically Middlesex, locally)
- Maintained by: Environment Agency
- Operation: Hydraulic
- First built: 1815
- Latest built: 1909
- Length: 81.28 m (266 ft 8 in)
- Width: 7.56 m (24 ft 10 in)
- Fall: 1.22 m (4 ft 0 in)
- Above sea level: 41 feet (12 m)
- Distance to Teddington Lock: 14 miles (23 km)
- Power is available out of hours

Penton Hook Lock is the sixth lowest lock of forty four on the non-tidal reaches of the River Thames in England. It faces an island which was until its construction a pronounced meander (a hook) and is on the site of its seasonal cutoff. It is against the left bank marking the church parish medieval border of Laleham and Staines upon Thames in Surrey for many centuries. Until 1965 their county was Middlesex. At 266 ft (81 m) it is the third longest lock on the river.

A bend 1000 yards (900 metres) upstream of the lock, Silvery Sands, hosts Staines Regatta in the sport of rowing annually. On the opposite bank in Thorpe is Penton Hook Marina which occupies lakes once land used for gravel extraction.

== History ==
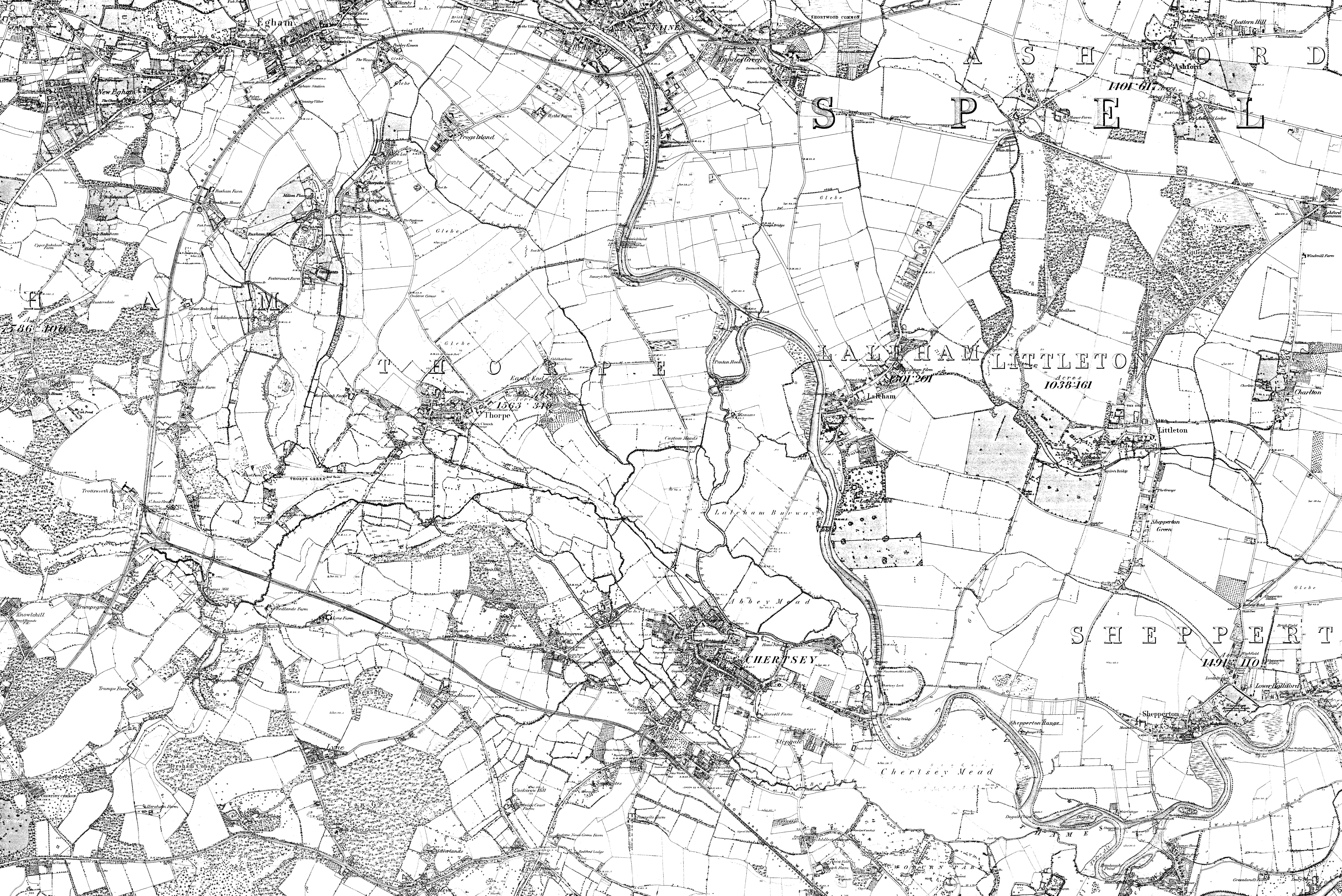
Extract from Map of Middlesex, Ordnance Survey, 1868-1883

Problems were long caused in erosion and to navigation by floodwaters topping the neck of the meander (a seasonal meander cutoff). The Corporation promoted the funding of the lock with formalised weirs in 1809, and Parliament passed its enabling act 1814. The lock was completed in 1815, two years after Chertsey Lock, as the Thames lock furthest upstream controlled by the City of London Corporation, whose arms appear on the Lock Cottage built in 1814. It soon became the sixth lock proceeding upstream, as it is today.

The main weir was built in 1846 when positioned below the offtake of the Abbey River, a medieval-established leat and so sited for the benefit of watermill power; the grain mills were by the end of that century superseded by large industrial granaries. Horse, cattle and crop farming tenants had conflicting interest of reducing its flow; in spate, the weirs elsewhere reduced the flow of the main river for a mile or more (such as beside Laleham Park). For a few years the leat was sourced above the main weir thus increasing the flooding of Laleham Burway and other fields of northern Chertsey; its shallow course has banks without bundings and few sluices. These interests outweighing those of the outdated mill led to start of the Abbey River being moved to below the main weir of Penton Hook, reducing the enhanced flows along the Abbey River. To resume additional flood relief channels, as of the early 2020s, the Environment Agency proposes new instances of channels below this lock and that below to act in the same way as the Jubilee River upstream which fast tracks flows from above Maidenhead to below Windsor.

The lock was rebuilt in 1909.

== Access and location ==
The lock is accessible on foot or bicycle along the towpath from Blacksmiths Lane and its spur Riverside or Penton Hook Road.

The lock is against the left bank marking the Church parish medieval border of Laleham and Staines upon Thames in Surrey since at least the Norman Conquest. By boat the lock can be accessed from Thorpe on the right bank.

== Reach above the lock ==
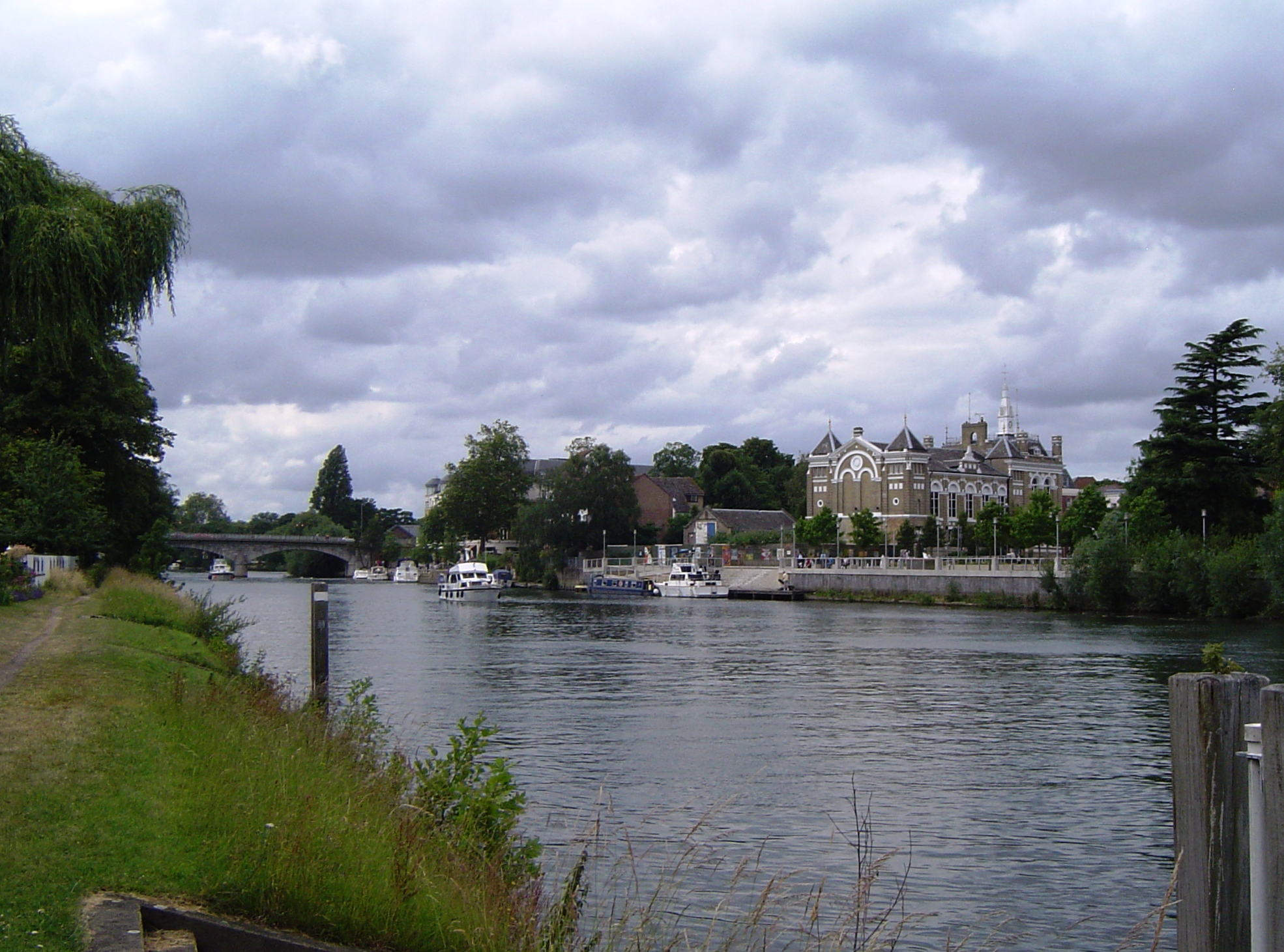
Old Town Hall and Market Square, Staines from Egham Hythe

The river is built up in a range of suburban extents on both sides after the lock and passes through Staines-upon-Thames. On the near bank the 'bungalow town' of Penton Hook or South Staines was in existence by 1919. Between Staines Railway Bridge and Staines Bridge is an open riverside area with pubs on both sides and two of the seven mouths (see distributary) of the River Colne, briefly canalised, join the Thames, the eponymous final arm in the town centre and Sweeps Ditch. In the upper reach on the left bank is a replica of the London Stone placed near here in 1285 to mark the upper limit of the tidal Thames and the jurisdiction of the City of London. Beside it is Church Island and a recreation area. Upstream are Hollyhock Island and its wooded islet Holm Island; where the right bank was a 20th-century industrial area with gas works and water works, redeveloped into business and retail estates. A widened single-span bridge designed by Edwin Lutyens carries the M25 motorway and the A30 across the river downstream of Bell Weir lock. Below the town's rowing club on the Egham side, Staines Regatta takes place at Silvery Sands 1000 yards (900 metres) above the lock in July.

=== Thames Path ===
The Thames Path is on the right bank (that is by convention proceeding downstream) from Bell Weir Lock; at Staines Bridge it crosses to the left bank.

== See also ==
- Locks on the River Thames
- Rowing on the River Thames

Next lock upstream	River Thames	Next lock downstream
Bell Weir Lock; 4.33 km (2.69 mi)	Penton Hook Lock; Grid reference: TQ044695	Chertsey Lock; 3.13 km (1.94 mi)
