= Staines Bridge =

Bridge across the River Thames in England

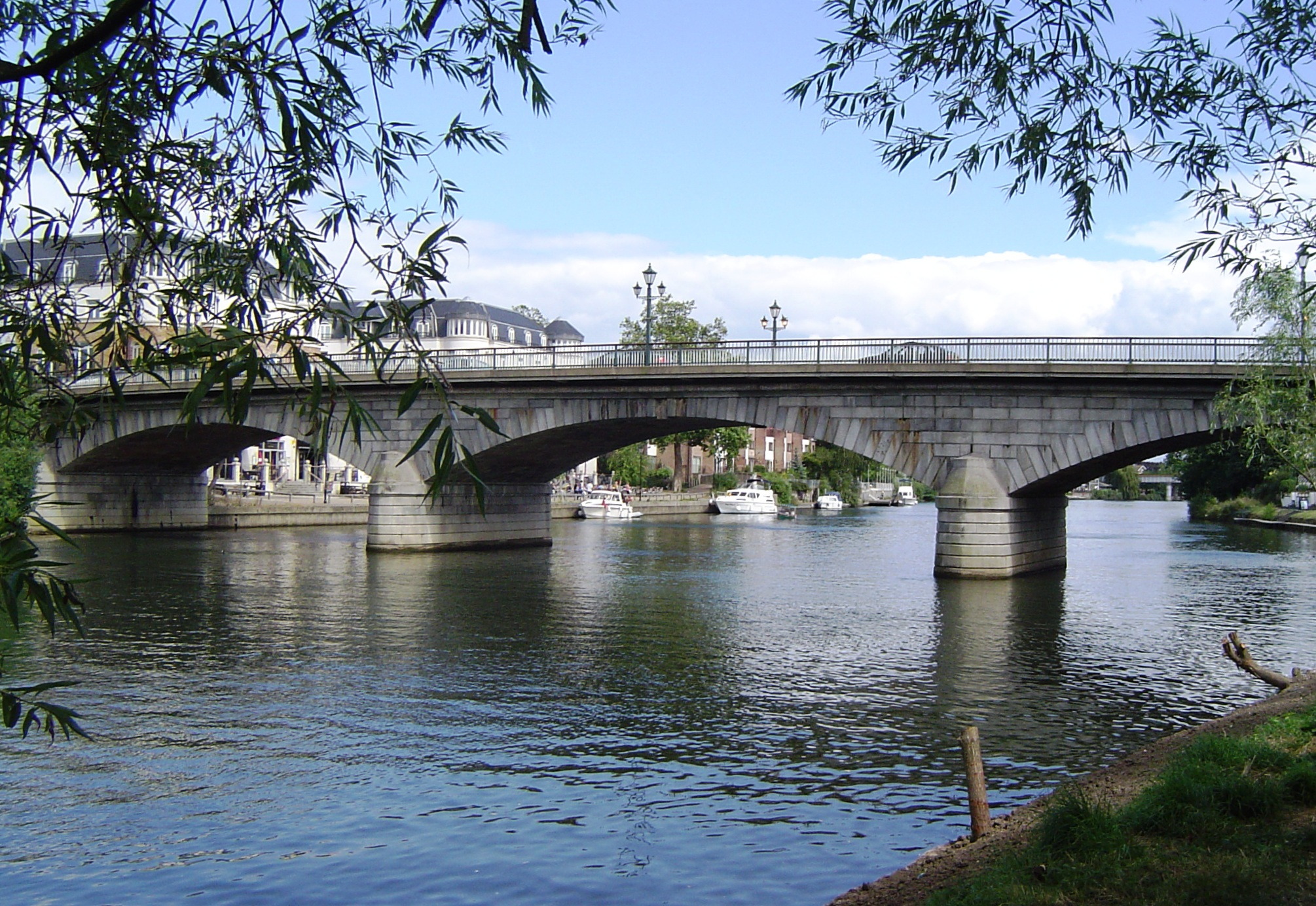
- Staines Bridge from upstream
- Coordinates: 51°26′00″N 0°31′01″W
- Carries: A308 road, Thames Path
- Crosses: River Thames
- Locale: Staines-upon-Thames
- Maintained by: Surrey County Council

Characteristics
- Design: Arch
- Material: Granite
- No. of spans: 3 (over water), 9 (total)
- Piers in water: 2
- Clearance below: 5.94 m (19.5 ft)

History
- Designer: George Rennie
- Opened: 1832

Listed Building – Grade II
- Official name: Staines Bridge
- Designated: 11 August 1952
- Reference no.: 1187018

Location
- Interactive map of Staines Bridge

Staines Bridge is a road bridge running in a south-west to north-east direction across the River Thames in Surrey. It is on the modern A308 road and links the boroughs of Spelthorne and Runnymede at Staines-upon-Thames and Egham Hythe. The bridge is Grade II listed.

The bridge crosses the Thames on the reach between Penton Hook Lock and Bell Weir Lock, and is close to and upstream of the main mouth of the River Colne, a tributary. The bridge carries the Thames Path across the river.

Its forebear built in Roman Britain, the bridge has been bypassed by three arterial routes, firstly in 1961 by the Runnymede Bridge near Wraysbury and in the 1970s by the building of the UK motorway network (specifically near Maidenhead and Chertsey). Owing to the commercial centres of the town in Spelthorne and of Egham, the bridge has had peak hour queues since at least the 1930s.

== Description ==
Staines Bridge is a road and pedestrian bridge across the River Thames at Staines-upon-Thames in north-west Surrey. It carries the A308 road and the Thames Path over the river. It is built of white granite from Aberdeen and has three arches over water, four arches on the north bank and two on the south bank. The bridge has a total width of 33 ft (10 m).

Staines Bridge is 35 miles 5.75 furlongs (57 km) upstream of London Bridge and has a clearance of 19.5 ft (5.94 m) above the water level for navigation. The main span is 74 ft (23 m) and the adjacent arches are 66 ft (20 m). The roadway is 24 ft wide (7.3 m) and the two pavements, which overhang the river, are each 4 ft 6 in wide (1.37 m).

== History ==
The Roman road from Londinium (London) to Calleva Atrebatum (Silchester), commonly called the Devil's Highway, crossed the Thames in the Staines area. Both the Thames and Colne are thought to have had multiple channels during this period, which may have necessitated the building of more than one bridge. It is thought that Staines was chosen as the location of the crossing, because the gravel islands in the area constrained the main river channel so that it could be bridged.

The exact position of the Roman crossing is uncertain. It could have been on the site of the later medieval bridge at the end of the High Street or further upstream, closer to Egham. There was a settlement in the area surrounding the High Street and, although the date of its foundation is uncertain, the earliest archaeological evidence is from 54–96 AD, corresponding to the reign of Nero and the period of the Flavian Dynasty. However, more recent excavations have revealed that the width of the Thames at this point was around 230 m (250 yd) in Roman times, which may have been too wide for a bridge of that period, leading to the alternative proposal of a site closer to Egham, possibly as far upstream as Church Island.

The first surviving mention of a bridge from the medieval period is a document from 1222, that authorises repairs using wood cut from Windsor Forest. In around 1250, a causeway was constructed at Egham Hythe to improve the southern approach to the crossing (Note: Phil Jones, an archaeologist, suggests that the Egham Hythe causeway may have originally been built by the Romans and that the work in the mid-13th century was a repair or extension, rather than a new construction.) Also during the 13th century, there were renewals of the grant of pontage and, in 1376, tolls were levied on boat traffic to provide additional funds for maintenance. Local people left bequests for not only the repair of the bridge, but also for the upkeep of the roads leading to it on each side of the river.

Staines Bridge Act 1739
- Act of Parliament
- Parliament of Great Britain
- Long title: An Act for the more effectual Maintenance and Well-keeping of Staines Bridge and Egham Causeway, being the Highway from London to the West Parts of England.
- Citation: 13 Geo. 2. c. 25
- Territorial extent: Great Britain

Dates
- Royal assent: 29 April 1740
- Commencement: 15 November 1739 (Note: Start of session.)
- Repealed: 20 June 1791
Other legislation
Repealed by	Staines Bridge Act 1791
Relates to	Staines Bridge Tolls Act 1509; Staines Bridge and Egham Causeway Act 1597

Status: Repealed

Text of statute as originally enacted

Staines Bridge Act 1791
- Act of Parliament
- Parliament of Great Britain
- Long title: An Act for building a Bridge cross the River Thames from Stanes to Egham, in the Counties of Middlesex and Surrey.
- Citation: 31 Geo. 3. c. 84
- Territorial extent: Great Britain

Dates
- Royal assent: 6 June 1791
- Commencement: 20 June 1791 (Note: Section 1.)
- Repealed: 29 June 1828
Other legislation
Repeals/revokes	Staines Bridge Act 1739
Amended by	Staines Bridge Act 1804
Repealed by	Staines Bridge Act 1828
Relates to	Staines Bridge Tolls Act 1509; Staines Bridge and Egham Causeway Act 1597

Status: Repealed

Text of statute as originally enacted

The bridge was destroyed in the Civil War and was not rebuilt until the 1680s. The Staines Bridge Act 1739 (13 Geo. 2. c. 25) noted that the structure was "in a ruinous and dangerous condition" and that the money raised from tolls and local taxes was insufficient to fund adequate maintenance. A second act, the Staines Bridge Act 1791 (31 Geo. 3. c. 84) authorised the construction of a new bridge, alongside the existing structure, which was retained. The new bridge, designed by Thomas Sandby, opened in 1796, but the foundations were too shallow and one of the piers began to subside. The bridge was closed two years later after cracks started to form in the stonework. The artist, J. M. W. Turner, produced a sketch of Sandby's bridge when it was under construction, which was subsequently turned into an engraving by John George Murray. Part of the bridge is still visible in the garden of the former tollhouse, 14, The Hythe, on the Egham side of the river.

Staines Bridge Act 1804
- Act of Parliament
- Parliament of the United Kingdom
- Long title: An Act to amend an act, made In the thirty-first year of His present Majesty, for building a bridge cross the river Thames from Staines to Egham, in the counties of Middlesex and Surrey.
- Citation: 44 Geo. 3. c. lxxviii
- Territorial extent: United Kingdom

Dates
- Royal assent: 10 July 1804
- Commencement: 10 July 1804 (Note: The Acts of Parliament (Commencement) Act 1793.)
- Repealed: 29 June 1828
Other legislation
Amends	Staines Bridge Act 1791
Repealed by	Staines Bridge Act 1828

Status: Repealed

Text of statute as originally enacted

A cast-iron replacement was designed by James Wilson and opened in 1803. It joined the surviving parts of Sandby's bridge on each side with a segment cut from an exhibition bridge that had been erected in Hyde Park. However, the weight of the iron girders used, exerted too much lateral pressure on the abutments; within two months, the metal had cracked and the still-standing 1680 bridge was used again instead. Another bridge was authorised by a further act of Parliament, the Staines Bridge Act 1804 (44 Geo. 3. c. lxxviii). It was designed by John Rennie and was constructed of timber, strengthened with cast iron plates. Although it did not suffer from the problems of the previous two bridges, it was costly to maintain (£11,000 in 1827, equivalent to £1.01 million in 2025) and restricted the size of boats passing beneath it.

Staines Bridge Act 1828
- Act of Parliament
- Parliament of the United Kingdom
- Long title: An Act for building a Bridge over the River Thames at Staines in the County of Middlesex, and for making proper Approaches thereto.
- Citation: 9 Geo. 4. c. c
- Territorial extent: United Kingdom

Dates
- Royal assent: 19 June 1828
- Commencement: 29 June 1828 (Note: Section 1. The second Monday after the passing of the act.)
Other legislation
Repeals/revokes	Staines Bridge Act 1791; Staines Bridge Act 1804
Amended by	Staines Bridge Act 1829; Staines Bridge Act 1834

Status: Amended

Text of statute as originally enacted

The Staines Bridge Act 1828 (9 Geo. 4. c. c) authorised the borrowing of up to £60,000 (£4.26 million in 2025) for the construction of a fourth bridge. The granite structure was designed by George Rennie and was based on Waterloo Bridge. Rennie insisted that the site of the crossing be moved upstream of the confluence of the Colne and Thames, where deeper foundations could be constructed. The repositioning required new approach roads to be constructed and the necessary land was subject to compulsory purchase.

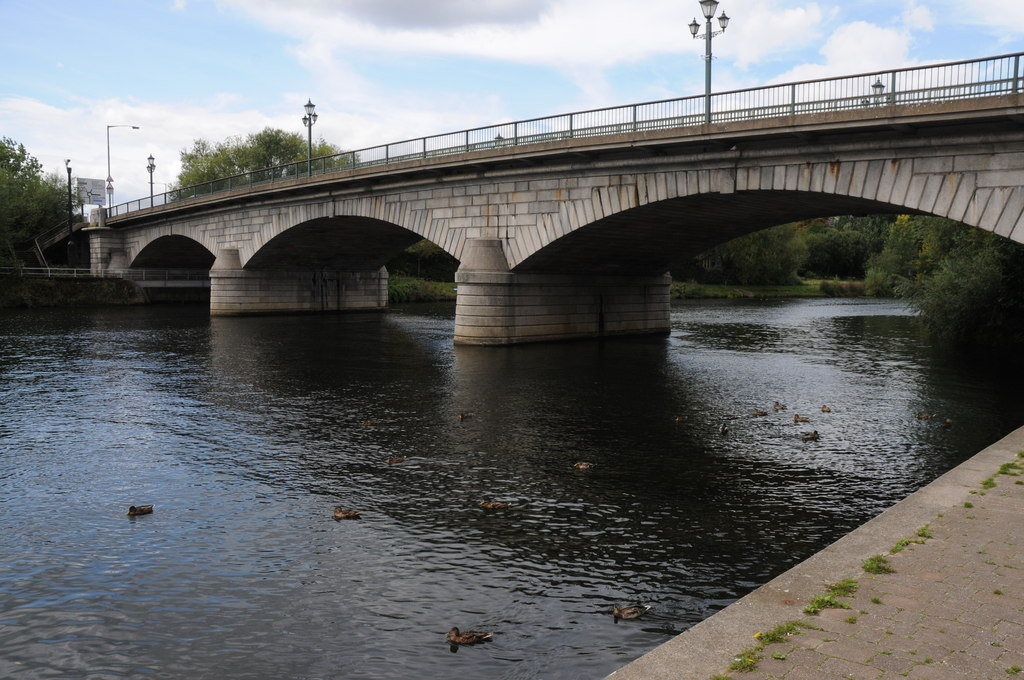
Staines Bridge, opened 1832

The foundation stones were laid on each side of the river in September 1829 and William IV opened the bridge in April 1832. The contractors responsible for constructing the bridge were Joliffe and Banks and the total cost was £44,000 (£4.26 million in 2025). Tolls for crossing the bridge were abolished in 1871 under the Kew and Other Bridges Act 1869 (32 & 33 Vict. c. xix).

A Bailey bridge was constructed on the upstream side of the 1832 bridge in 1939, to provide an alternative crossing in the event of the Rennie's bridge being bombed. Neither bridge was damaged during the war, but the Bailey bridge remained in use for pedestrians until 1956, when Staines Bridge was widened with the addition of overhanging pavements either side of the roadway. A 10 t (11 tons) weight limit for vehicles was imposed in 1978, reduced to 7.5 t (8.3 tons) by 1990. During repairs in 1993, wartime demolition charges were discovered, still embedded in the structure.

== Literature and art ==
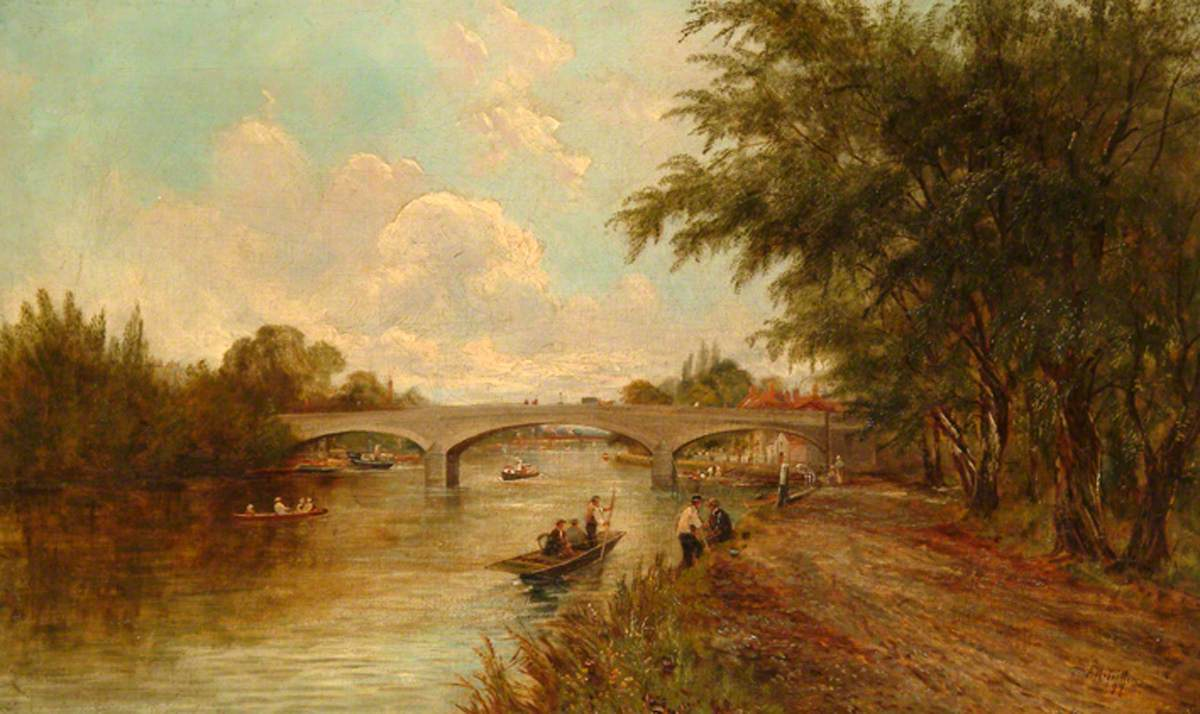
Staines Bridge, Surrey (1879) by Arthur Melville

In his Arthurian novel, Enemy of God, Bernard Cornwell sites an 11-arch stone bridge at Staines. He attributes it seven arches over the river with two on land at each end. At the western end is a tower over the road from Calleva, which bears a plaque commemorating its construction by Hadrian. At the eastern end is an earth-walled settlement.

Chertsey Museum holds an oil painting of Staines Bridge by Arthur Melville, dated 1879.

== See also ==
- Crossings of the River Thames

== Bibliography ==
- Cornwell, Bernard (1997). Enemy of God. London: Penguin. ISBN 978-0-14-023247-9.
- Cossons, Neil; Trinder, Barrie (2002) [1979]. The Iron Bridge: Symbol of the Industrial Revolution (2nd ed.). Chichester: Phillimore. ISBN 978-1-86-077230-6.
- Davenport, Neil (2006). Thames Bridges from Dartford to the Source. Kettering: Silver Link. ISBN 978-1-85-794229-3.
- De Maré, Eric Samuel (1975). Bridges of Britain. London: B. T. Batsford. ISBN 978-0-7134-2925-1.
- Jones, Phil (2010). The Roman and Medieval Town of Staines. Woking: Spoilheap Publications. ISBN 978-0-95-588461-0.
- Lunn, Geoff (2022). Thames Crossings through Time. Stroud: Amberley Publishing. ISBN 978-1-39-810576-8.
- Maryfield, Pamela (2006). Staines : A history. Chichester: Phillimore. ISBN 978-1-86-077420-1.
- Mills, John (1993). A guide to the industrial history of Spelthorne. Guildford: Surrey Industrial History Group. ISBN 978-0-95-096976-3.
- Phillips, Geoffrey (1981). Thames Crossings: Bridges, Tunnels, and Ferries. Newton Abbot: David & Charles. ISBN 978-0-71-538202-8.
- Reynolds, Susan, ed. (1962). A History of the County of Middlesex: Volume 3, Shepperton, Staines, Stanwell, Sunbury, Teddington, Heston and Isleworth, Twickenham, Cowley, Cranford, West Drayton, Greenford, Hanwell, Harefield and Harlington. London: Victoria County History. Archived from the original on 8 January 2022.
- Smith, Denis (2001). Civil Engineering Heritage London and the Thames Valley. London: Thomas Telford Ltd. ISBN 978-0-72-772876-0.
- Thacker, Fred S. (1920). The Thames Highway. Vol. II: Locks and Weirs. London: Dyer's Buildings.
- Thompson, Russell (2004). Staines : A history and celebration. Salisbury: Francis Frith. ISBN 978-1-90-493846-0.
- Woodgate, Walter Bradford (1889). Boating. London: Longmans, Green and Company. p. 309.

Next bridge upstream	River Thames	Next bridge downstream
Runnymede Bridge	Staines Bridge	Staines Railway Bridge
Next bridge upstream	Thames Path	Next bridge downstream
southern bank Albert Bridge	Staines Bridge	northern bank Shepperton to Weybridge Ferry
