= Holm Island =

Island in the River Thames, England

Coordinates: 51°26′10.5″N 00°31′39.5″W

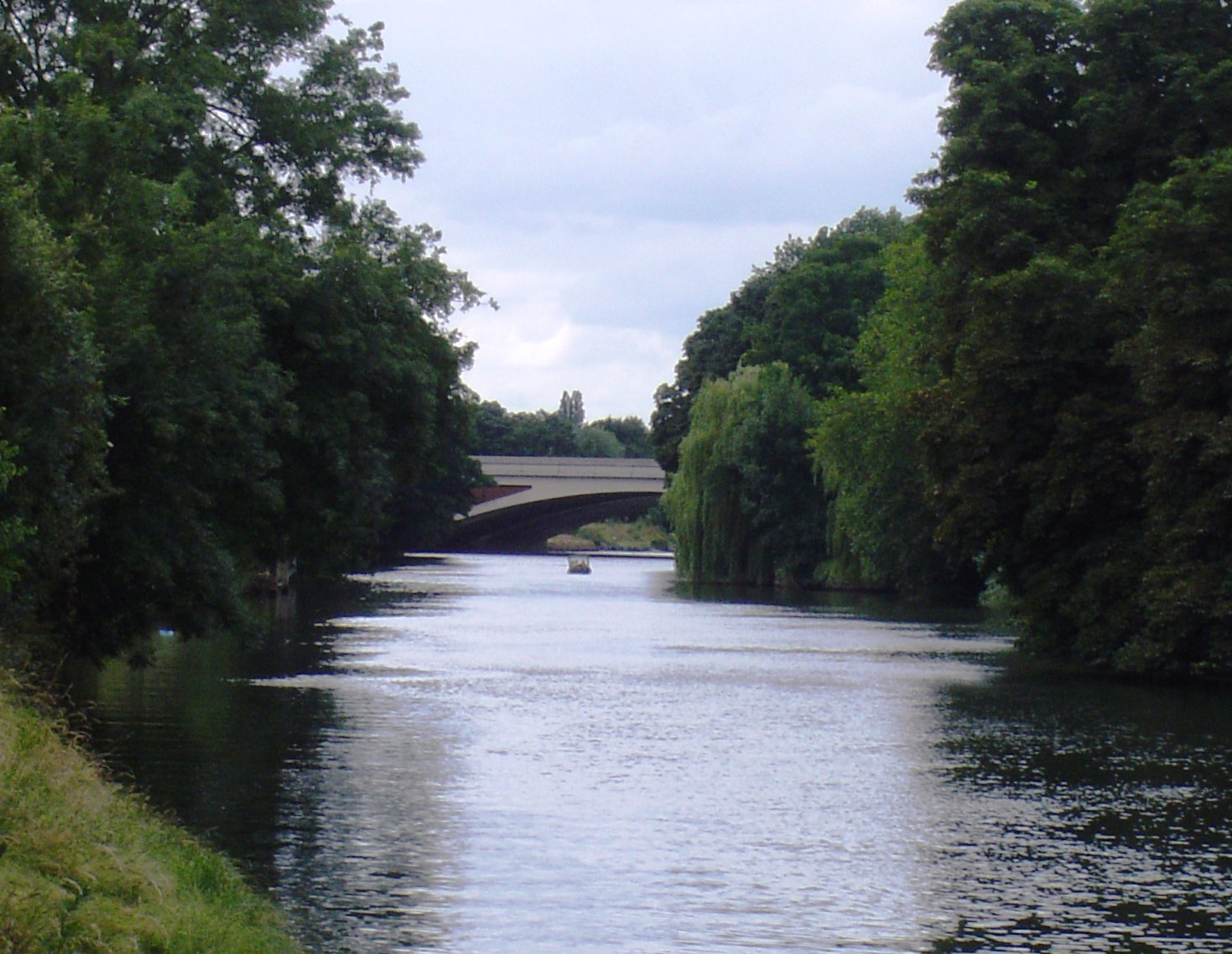
Holm Island on the right on the approach to the M25 Bridge

Holm Island is an island in the River Thames in England on the reach above Penton Hook Lock, near Staines. It is on the Buckinghamshire bank, just upstream of Hollyhock Island.

It is privately owned, and has a 5 bedroom 5000 sq ft house - which was marketed for sale at £3m in August 2025 along with Hollyhock Island. On the next door, smaller island of Hollyhock was once a house known as "The Nest", which was used as a hideaway by the future Edward VIII and Wallis Simpson during the 1930s.

The island regularly floods, and the house built has been designed with a ground floor of void spaces designed to allow the flow of water if and when the island floods. When marketed for sale, it was shared that any future owner might wish to transform the existing house or demolish and re-build a flood-resilient or eco-amphibious house.

== See also ==
- Islands in the River Thames

Next island upstream	River Thames	Next island downstream
The Island, Hythe End	Holm Island; Hollyhock Island; Grid reference TQ023718	Church Island
