= Pats Croft Eyot =

Island in the River Thames, England

Coordinates: 51.4490°N 0.5658°W

Map showing the location of Pats Croft Eyot within Berkshire.

Pats Croft Eyot is a small island in the River Thames in England on the reach above Bell Weir Lock, near Wraysbury, Berkshire and Runnymede, Surrey. The island is privately owned and is inhabited.

== See also ==
- Islands in the River Thames

Next island upstream	River Thames	Next island downstream
The Island, Wraysbury then Friary Island	Pats Croft Eyot	Magna Carta Island
