= Friary Island =

Island in the River Thames, England

Coordinates: 51.458°N 0.573°W

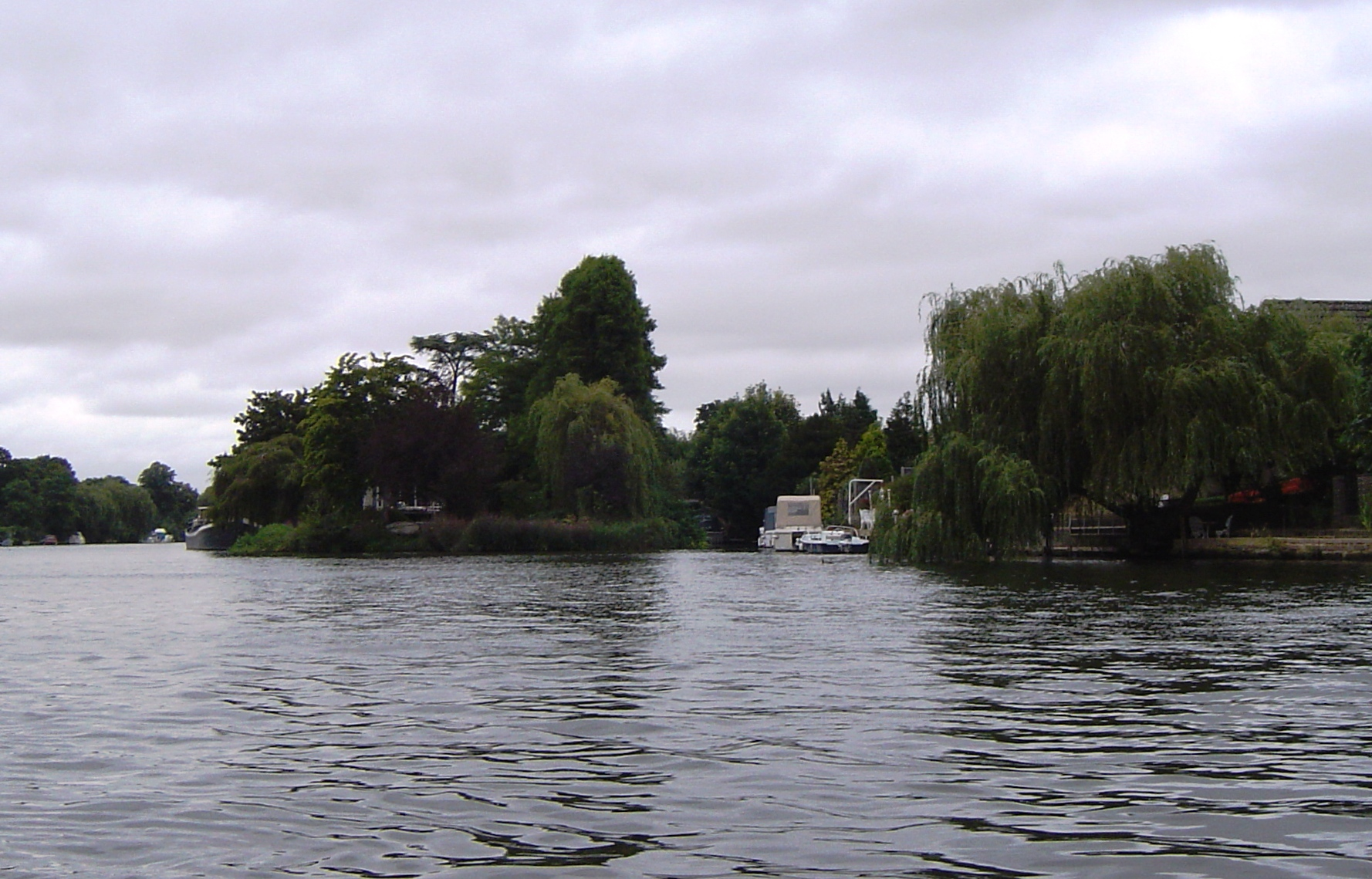
Downstream section of Friary Island

Map showing the location of Friary Island within Berkshire.

Friary Island is an island in the River Thames in England. It is located on the reach above Bell Weir Lock, on the approach to Old Windsor Lock at Wraysbury, Berkshire. It is just across the river from Old Windsor, where there was a friary from which it took its name.

The island is inhabited, with about 40 houses, and is accessible via a road bridge.

== See also ==
- Islands in the River Thames

Next island upstream	River Thames	Next island downstream
Friday Island	Friary Island	The Island, Wraysbury then Pats Croft Eyot
