= Runnymede Bridge =

Motorway bridge across the River Thames in South East England

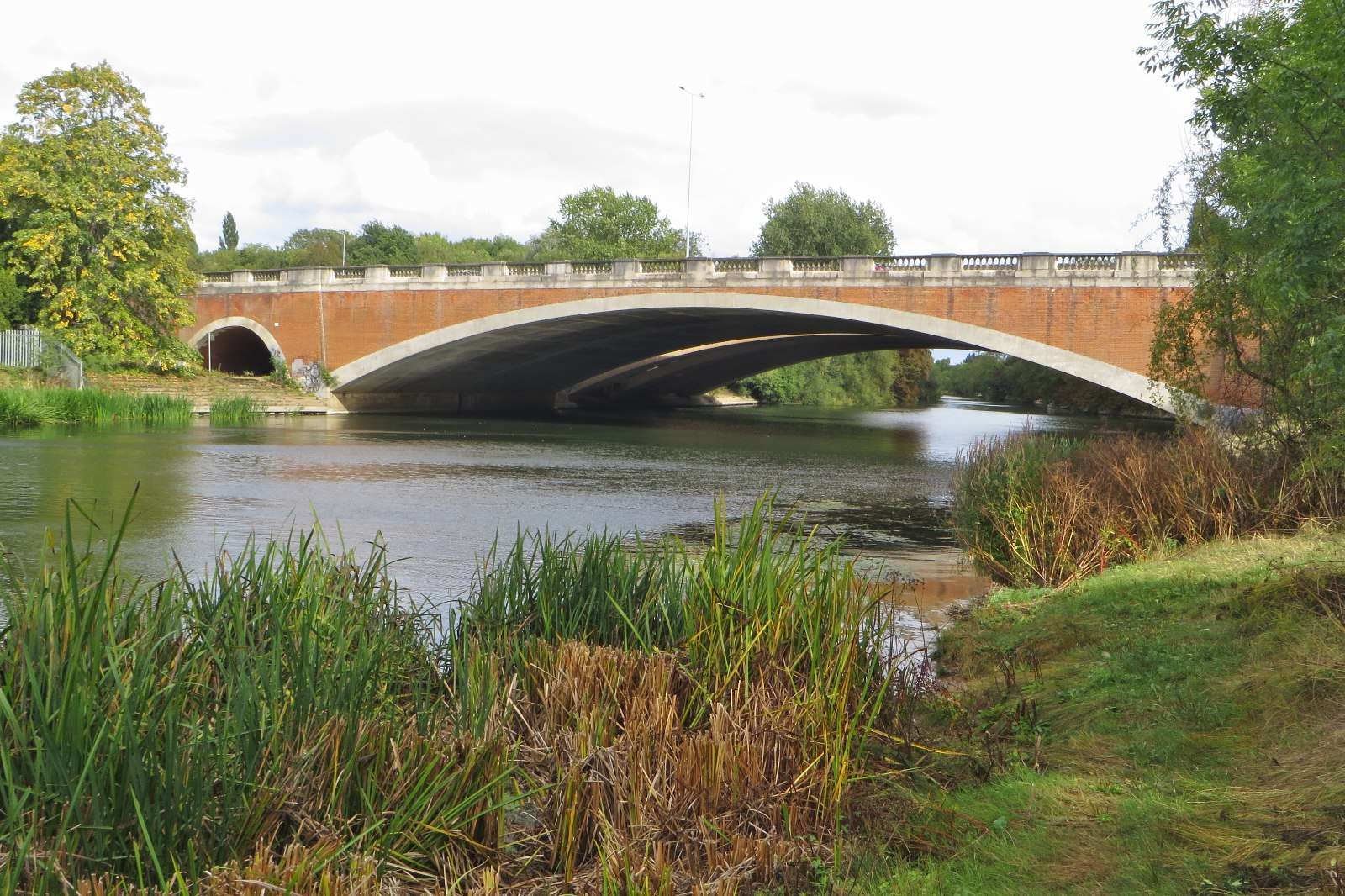
- Runnymede Bridge from upstream
- Coordinates: 51°26′15″N 0°32′05″W
- Carries: M25, A30
- Crosses: River Thames
- Locale: Staines-upon-Thames, Surrey, England

Characteristics
- Design: arch
- Piers in water: 0
- Clearance below: 23 ft 0 in (7.01 m)

Location
- Interactive map of Runnymede Bridge

Runnymede Bridge and New Runnymede Bridge are two adjacent motorway and A-road bridges crossing the River Thames in Surrey, South East England. The older Runnymede Bridge was originally designed by Edwin Lutyens in 1939 as part of a scheme to construct a bypass for Staines-upon-Thames, but the project was interrupted by the outbreak of the Second World War. It was finally opened in 1961, having been built to a modified design, capable of accommodating higher traffic volumes. Since the early 1980s it has carried the northbound traffic lanes of the M25 motorway and the A30 road.

The New Runnymede Bridge was completed in 1981 and carries the southbound lanes of the two roads. It was designed by Ove Arup and Partners to complement the profile of the 1961 bridge.

== Description ==
=== Runnymede Bridge ===
Runnymede Bridge carries the northbound lanes of the M25 motorway and A30 Staines Bypass across the River Thames, downstream of Bell Weir Lock, near Staines-upon-Thames in Surrey. It has a total length of 415 feet (126 metres) and the main span across the navigable river channel is 173 ft 6 in (52.88 m). The towpaths pass through two smaller arches, one on each side of the river, each with a span of 31 ft (9.4 m). The reinforced concrete deck is 100 ft (30 m) wide.

The foundations of the bridge reach into the London Clay, which is 21–25 ft (6.4–7.6 m) below ground level. The deck is supported by 18 arched steel ribs, clad in concrete. The sides of the bridge are clad with hand-made red bricks, with Portland stone and white concrete mouldings. The bridge provides a clearance of 23 ft 0 in (7.01 m) for river traffic.

=== New Runnymede Bridge ===
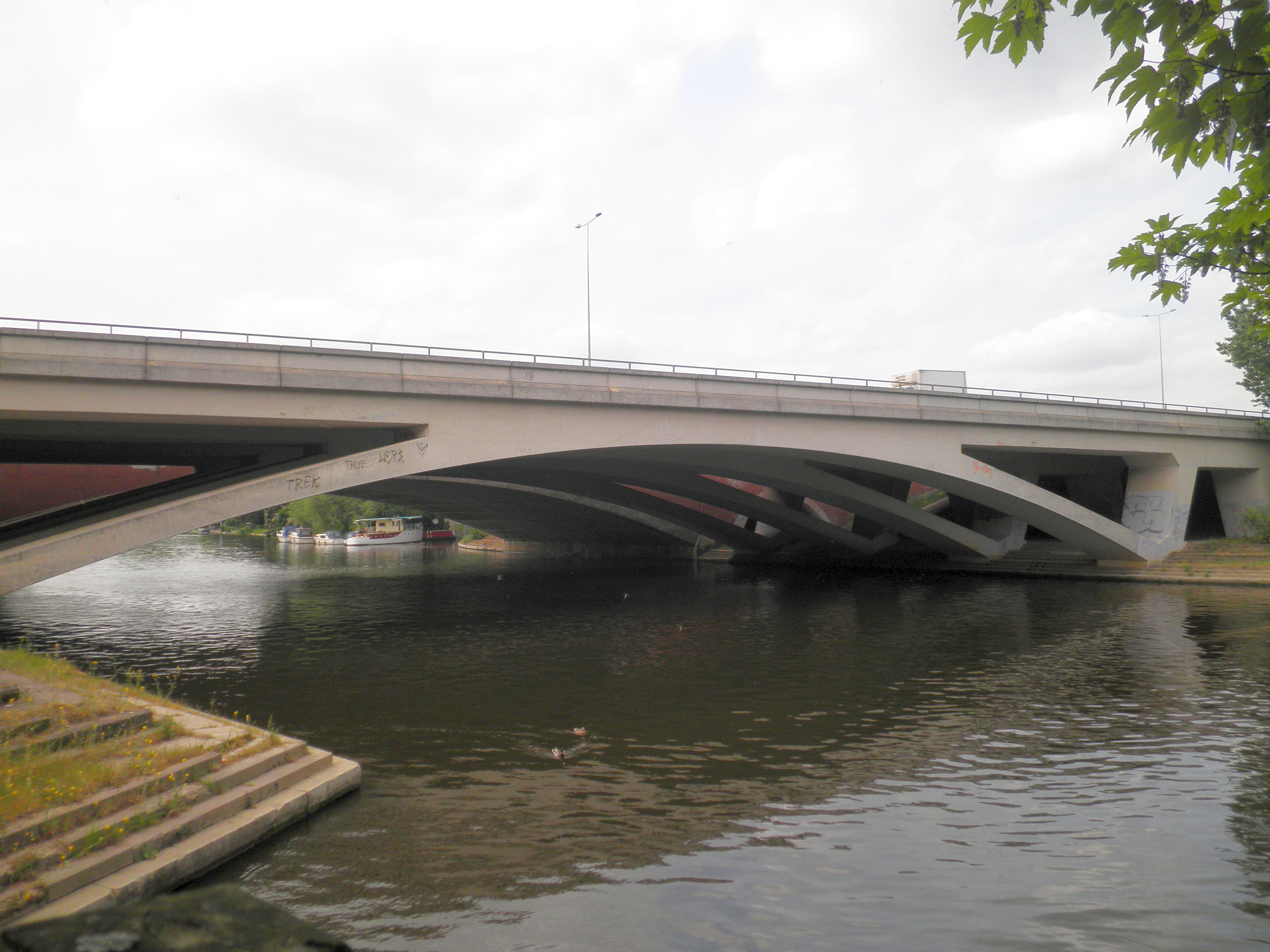
The New Runnymede bridge pictured from the southern towpath on the downstream side

New Runnymede Bridge, immediately downstream of Runnymede Bridge, carries the southbound lanes of the M25 and A30 across the River Thames. It has a total length of 137.6 m (451 ft). The piled foundations rest on London Clay and support four concrete arches with a span of 54.66 m (179.3 ft). The roadways rest on a reinforced concrete deck, with a total width of 34 m (112 ft). The bridge provides a clearance of 23 ft 0 in (7.01 m) for river traffic.

== History ==
Runnymede Bridge was built to carry the A30 Staines Bypass road across the River Thames. It was originally designed in 1939 by the architect, Edwin Lutyens, with H. W. Fitzsimons acting as consulting engineer. The project was delayed by the Second World War and the scheme was not developed further until the mid-1950s. The design was modified to accommodate greater traffic volumes by the engineering firm, C. W. Glover and Partners, and the architect, George Stewart, although the external appearance of the bridge remained faithful to Lutyens's original intentions.

Construction work was undertaken by W. & C. French Ltd at a total cost of £476,000 (equivalent to £13.4 million in 2023), and Runnymede Bridge was formally opened on 17 November 1961 by John Hay, the Parliamentary Secretary to the Ministry of Transport. The road over the bridge was initially configured as a dual carriageway, with two 12 ft-wide (3.7 m) lanes provided for traffic in each direction, and a 9 ft-wide (2.7 m) footpath adjacent to the parapet on each side. At the time, plans were in development to route the proposed North Orbital Road (constructed as the M25) over the bridge, and a 34 ft-wide (10 m) central reservation was therefore provided to allow for the addition of further running lanes, giving the completed bridge a total width of 100 ft (30 m). The channel of the River Thames was also widened at the crossing to improve navigation conditions and to reduce the potential for bridge scour.

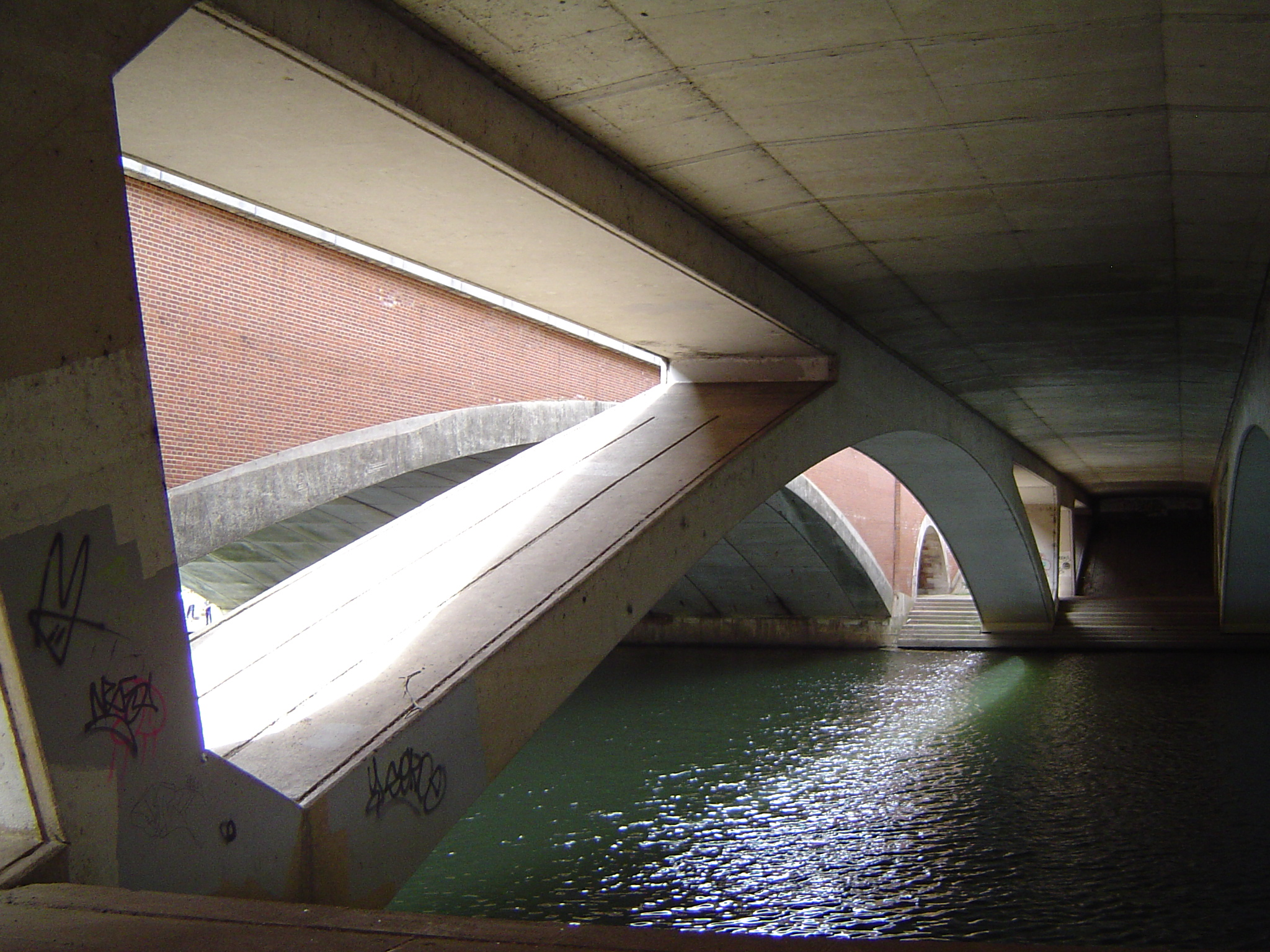
The arches of Runnymede Bridge viewed through those of New Runnymede Bridge

Detailed proposals were published in November 1975 for the extension of the M25 north from Egham over the Thames, which required the construction of a second bridge between Runnymede and Staines. Although widening of the existing bridge was considered, the design of the foundations meant that it would have been technically challenging to add additional arch girders. The new bridge was designed by Ove Arup and Partners with a similar arch profile to complement the 1961 bridge. The construction, undertaken by Fairclough Civil Engineering Ltd, was completed in November 1981 at a cost of £1.7 million (equivalent to £7.6 million in 2023).

Evidence of human activity, dating from the Mesolithic to the Bronze Age, was discovered during preparatory works for the construction of New Runnymede Bridge. Archaeological investigations in 1978 revealed a late Bronze Age settlement on the south bank of the Thames, beneath which there was evidence of a Neolithic site. Human remains uncovered included two jaw bones and a skull, as well as artefacts including amber and blue glass beads, a pottery ladle and shale bracelets.

== Bibliography ==
- Davenport, Neil (2006). Thames Bridges from Dartford to the Source. Kettering: Silver Link Publishing Ltd. ISBN 978-1-85-794229-3.
- De Maré, Eric Samuel (1975). Bridges of Britain. London: B. T. Batsford. ISBN 978-0-7134-2925-1.
- Jones, Peter (2006). Ove Arup: Masterbuilder of the Twentieth Century. New Haven: Yale University Press. ISBN 978-0-30-011296-2.
- Lunn, Geoff (2022). Thames Crossings through Time. Stroud: Amberley Publishing. ISBN 978-1-39-810576-8.
- Needham, Stuart (1991). Excavation and Salvage at Runnymede Bridge, 1978: The Late Bronze Age Waterfront Site. London: British Museum Press. ISBN 978-0-71-411397-5.
- Phillips, Geoffrey (1981). Thames Crossings: Bridges, Tunnels, and Ferries. Newton Abbot: David & Charles. ISBN 978-0-71-538202-8.
- Ramzan, David C. (2022). Thames Bridges. Stroud: Amberley Publishing. ISBN 978-1-39-810960-5.

Next crossing upstream	River Thames	Next crossing downstream
Albert Bridge	Runnymede Bridge	Staines Bridge
