= Staines Railway Bridge =

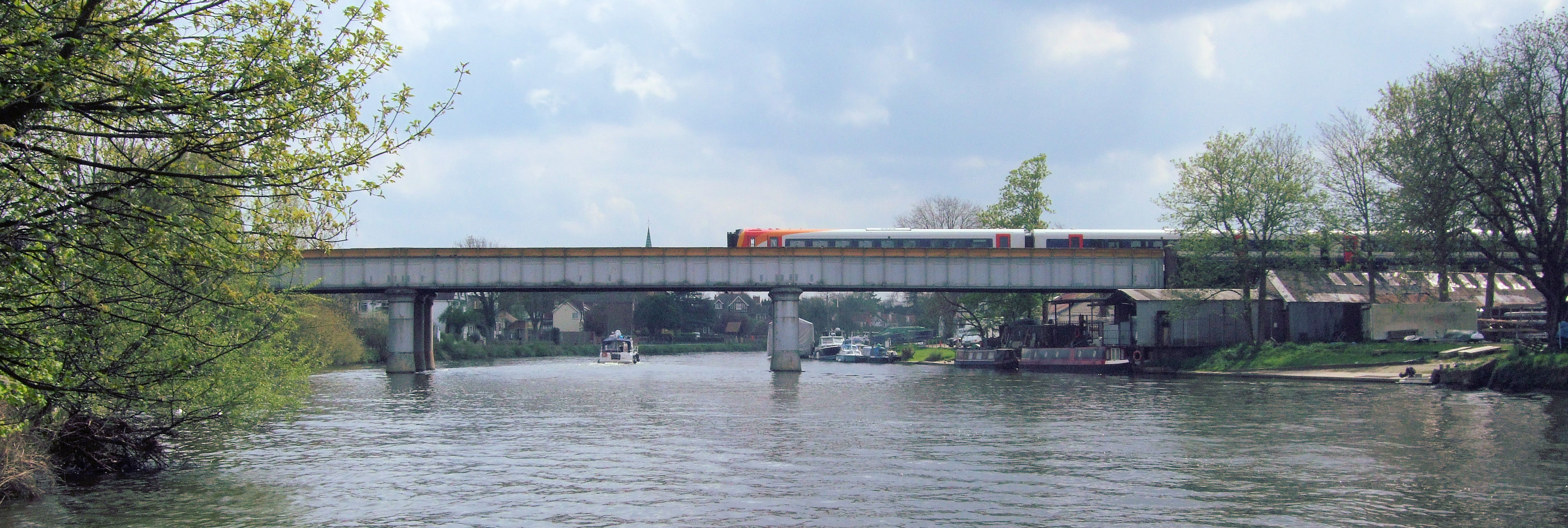
- Staines Railway Bridge from the north-west
- Coordinates: 51°25′50″N 0°30′40″W
- Carries: Waterloo to Reading line
- Crosses: River Thames
- Locale: Staines-upon-Thames, Surrey
- Maintained by: Network Rail

Characteristics
- Material: Cast iron and wrought iron
- No. of spans: 3
- Piers in water: 2
- Clearance below: 6.4 m (21 ft)

History
- Designer: John Gardner
- Opened: 1856

Location
- Interactive map of Staines Railway Bridge

Staines Railway Bridge is a railway viaduct in Staines-upon-Thames, Surrey, around 17 miles (28 kilometres) west of central London. It carries the Waterloo to Reading line across the Thames. Immediately to the east is Thames Street bridge, which carries the railway over the B376 and the Thames Path.

== Description ==
Staines Railway Bridge carries the two tracks of the electrified Waterloo to Reading line across the River Thames in Surrey, South East England. The bridge is 35 mi 3 furlongs (57 km) upstream of London Bridge and has a total length of 85.2 m (279 ft 8 in). It is built of wrought iron girders supported on six cast iron pillars, embedded in the river bed.

The central span is 27 m (88 ft 6 in) and the two adjacent spans are 26 m (85 ft 3 in). There are four brick flood arches on the southern bank, each with a span of 7.6 m (25 ft). The clearance below the bridge for river traffic is 6.4 m (21 ft).

== History ==
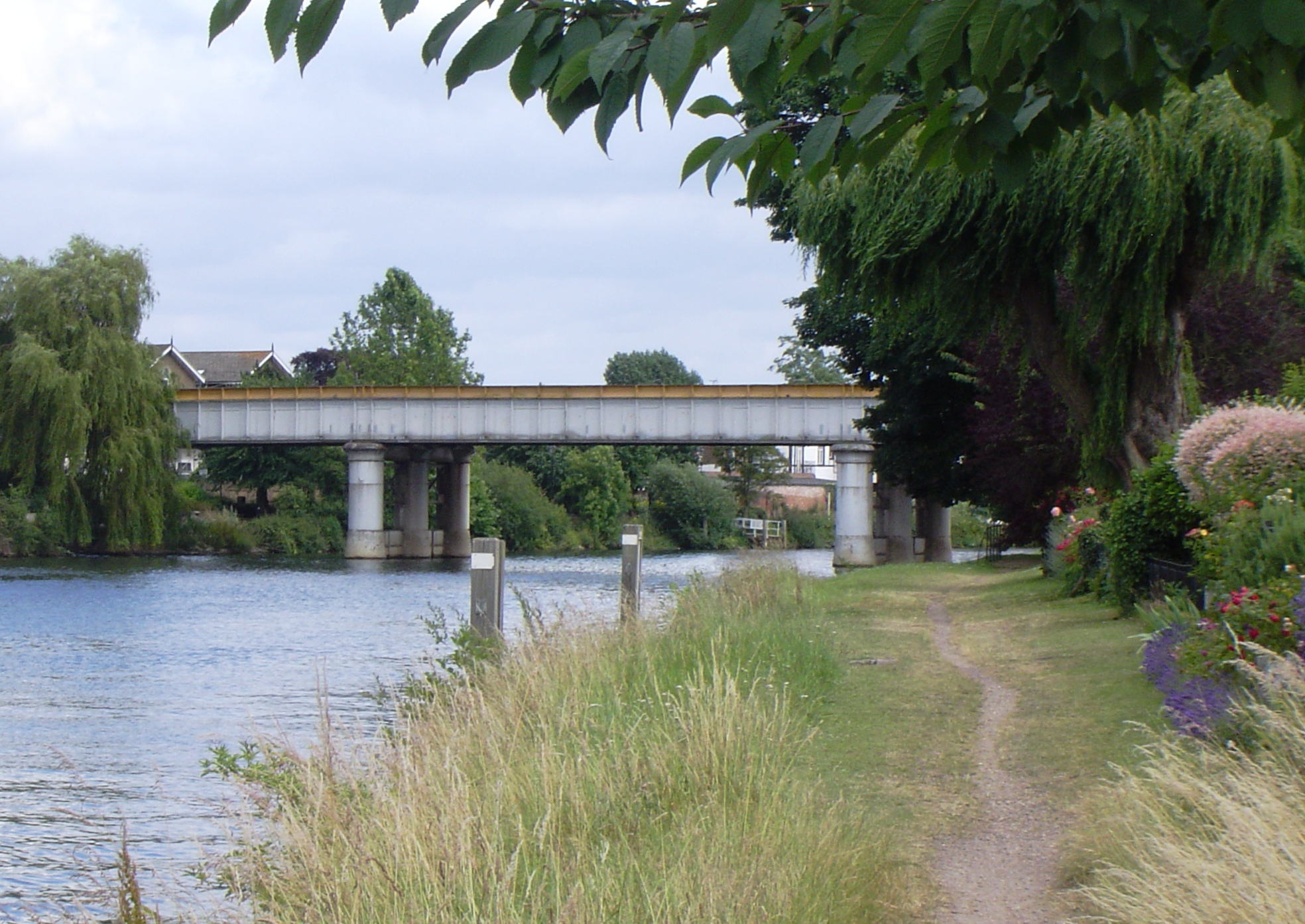
Staines Railway Bridge from upstream

The Staines, Wokingham, and Woking Railway Act 1853 (16 & 17 Vict. c. lxxxv) authorised the Staines, Wokingham and Woking Railway (SWWR) to build a line between Staines and Wokingham railway stations. Staines Railway Bridge was designed by John Gardner and was built by Cochrane & Co at a total cost of around £10,000. The bridge was completed in 1856, and the first part of the railway line, between Staines and Ascot, opened on 6 July that year. The SWWR merged with the London and South Western Railway in 1878. The main bridge girders were strengthened in 1915, and the line across the viaduct was electrified in 1937.

During the Second World War, the line was used to transport supplies to Portsmouth Naval Base and the bridge was guarded by a dedicated army platoon of around 25 soldiers. In 1995, a yellow stripe was painted onto each side of the viaduct in a £15,000 experimental project to prevent swans from flying into it.

== Thames Street bridge ==
The adjacent Thames Street bridge, which carries the railway over the B376 and the Thames Path, was named in 2021 as one of the country's ten railway bridges most likely to be struck by vehicles.

== See also ==
Media related to Staines Railway Bridge at Wikimedia Commons

- Staines Bridge upstream of the railway bridge
- Crossings of the River Thames

| Next bridge upstream | River Thames | Next bridge downstream |
| Staines Bridge | Staines Railway Bridge | M3 Chertsey Bridge |
