= Bell Weir Lock =

Lock on the River Thames in England

Coordinates: 51°26′18″N 0°32′16″W

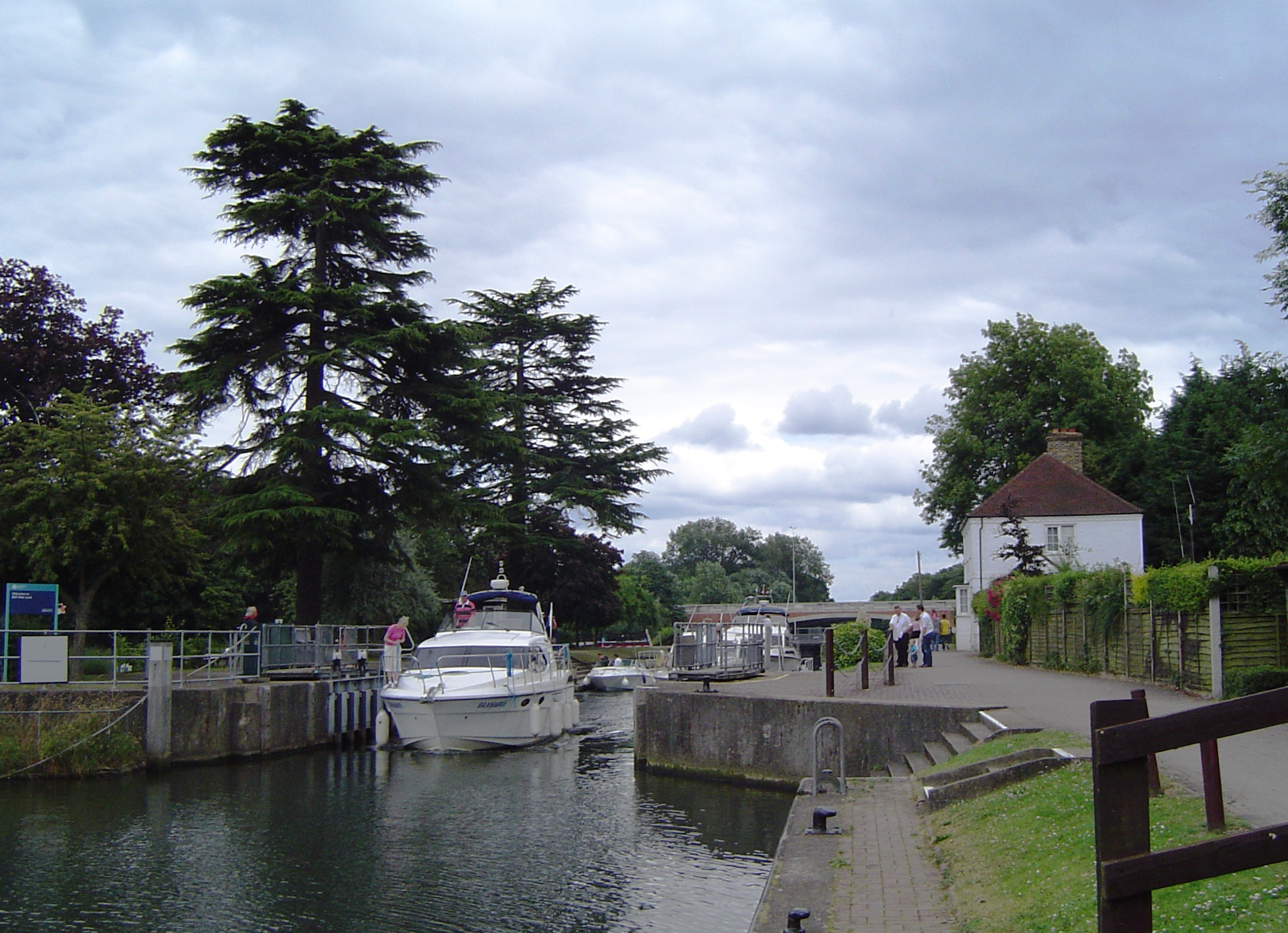
- Bell Weir Lock with the M25 crossing beyond
- Waterway: River Thames
- County: Surrey
- Maintained by: Environment Agency
- Operation: Hydraulic
- First built: 1817
- Latest built: 1877
- Length: 78.51 m (257 ft 7 in)
- Width: 7.44 m (24 ft 5 in)
- Fall: 1.82 m (6 ft 0 in)
- Above sea level: 47'
- Distance to Teddington Lock: 17 miles
- Power is available out of hours

Bell Weir Lock is a lock on the River Thames in England by the right bank, Runnymede which is a water meadow associated with Egham of importance for the constitutional Magna Carta. It is upstream of the terrace of a hotel and the a bridge designed by Edwin Lutyens who designed an ornamental park gate house along the reach. The bridge has been widened and carries the M25 and A30 road across the river in a single span. The lock was first built by the Thames Navigation Commission in 1817; it has one weir which is upstream. The lock is the eighth lowest of forty-five on the river and is named after the founder of the forerunner of the adjoining hotel who took charge of the lock and weir on its construction.

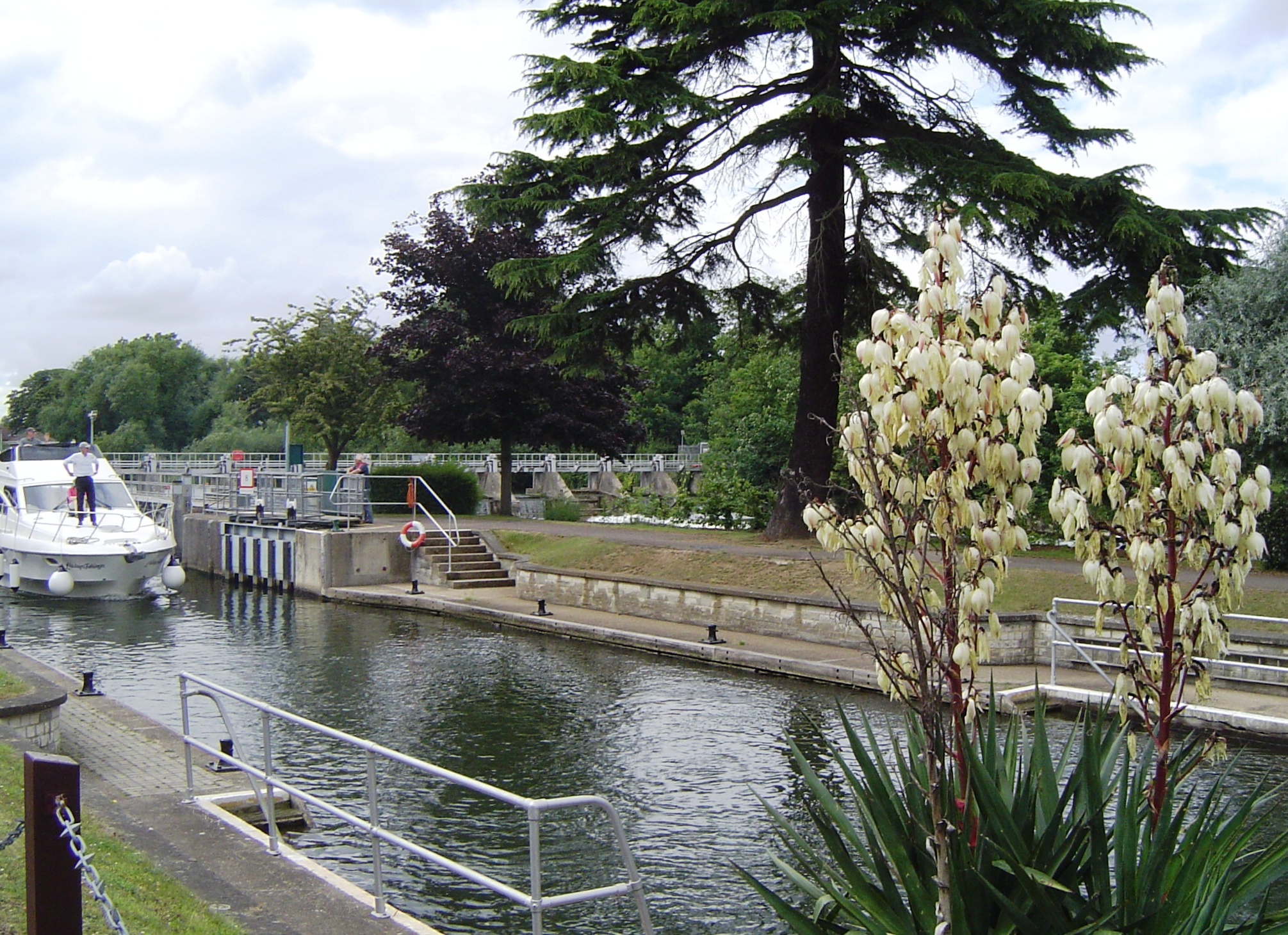
Bell Weir Lock with the weir behind

== History ==
A proposed location for a pound lock (impounded water as opposed to a flash lock) in 1811 was across the next bend upstream. The lock and embankments were built at its present site in the winter of 1817–1818. It was known as Egham Lock, but took its name from Charles "Charlie" Bell who founded in the 18th century an inn by the site, The Anglers Retreat, which he continued to operate when entrusted with keeping the lock and weir. The weir collapsed under weight of ice in 1827, so too the lock in 1866. Lock and weir were rebuilt in 1867. The lock had to be rebuilt in stone in 1877. A new weir was completed in 1904.

== Access to the lock ==
The lock can be reached on foot from the A308 road and is behind the Runnymede Hotel.

== Reach above the lock ==
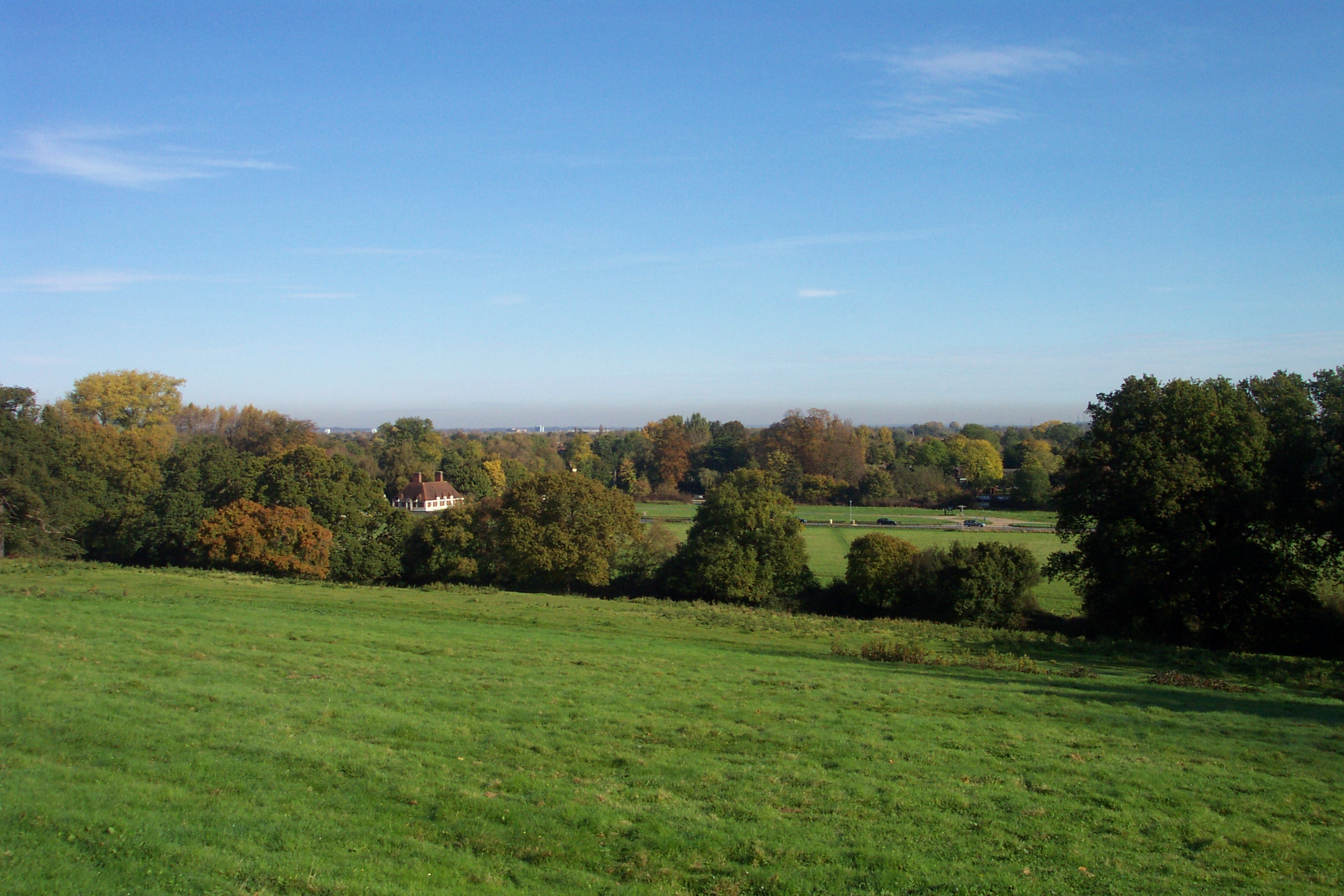
The meadow and riverside at Runnymede with a Lutyens gatehouse, as seen from the Kennedy Memorial

The reach runs through Runnymede to Old Windsor. Immediately on the left bank (right heading upstream) is a water input and management facility at the Hythe End part of Wraysbury that supplies the Staines Reservoirs followed by low-rise housing with gardens as on "The Island"; woods facing Magna Carta Island tucked close followed by Pats Croft Eyot; and more riverside dwellings at Wraysbury and on Friary Island. The right bank has riverside houses and a greater recreation area then the Runnymead meadows and Arts and Crafts architecture (Edwin Lutyens) gate houses. The Bells of Ouseley public house commemorates bells of Osney Abbey, Oxford which at the abbey's dissolution disappeared into the mud in official records. A longer built-up stretch follows at Old Windsor.

There are no bridges or ferries.

The reach is home to Wraysbury Skiff and Punting Club. Egham Regatta is held near Hythe End in June; Wraysbury and Old Windsor Regatta is held in August. Pleasure boats from the recreation ground can be launched upstream. The refreshment terraces of a hotel and spa adjoin the lock; hot-tub tugs and others with awnings operate. Its restaurants are The Lock and the Left Bank.

=== Thames Path ===
The Thames Path, having changed sides at Staines Bridge runs along the right bank to Old Windsor Lock.

== Literature and the media ==
In Three Men in a Boat, Jerome K Jerome records

Harris and I began to think that Bell Weir lock must have been done away with ... It was half-past seven when we were through .... We had originally intended to go on to Magna Carta Island....But somehow we did not feel that we yearned for the picturesque nearly so much now as we had earlier in the day. A bit of water between a coal barge and a gasworks would have quite satisfied us for that night

== See also ==
- Locks on the River Thames
- Rowing on the River Thames

Next lock upstream	River Thames	Next lock downstream
Old Windsor Lock; 4.94 km (3.07 mi)	Bell Weir Lock; Grid reference: TQ017720	Penton Hook Lock; 4.33 km (2.69 mi)
