= Colnbrook Estate Halt railway station =

Former railway station in England

Coordinates: 51.48515°N 0.50439°W

Colnbrook Estate Halt

General information
- Location: Poyle, Slough; England
- Grid reference: TQ039772
- Platforms: 1

Other information
- Status: Disused

History
- Original company: Western Region of British Railways

Key dates
- 1 May 1961: Station opened
- 29 March 1965: Station closed
Location

Colnbrook Estate Halt railway station was a station on the now closed railway line between West Drayton and Staines West, on the western edge of London, England. It was opened on 1 May 1961 by British Railways to serve the Colnbrook Industrial Estate.

The station closed to passengers on 29 March 1965 following the Beeching Report and has been completely demolished although the line through its site serves an aggregate depot and a fuel depot.

| Preceding station | Disused railways | Following station |
|---|---|---|
| Colnbrook; Line and station closed | Western Region of British Railways; Staines West branch | West Drayton; Line closed, station open |
