= Thorney Interchange =

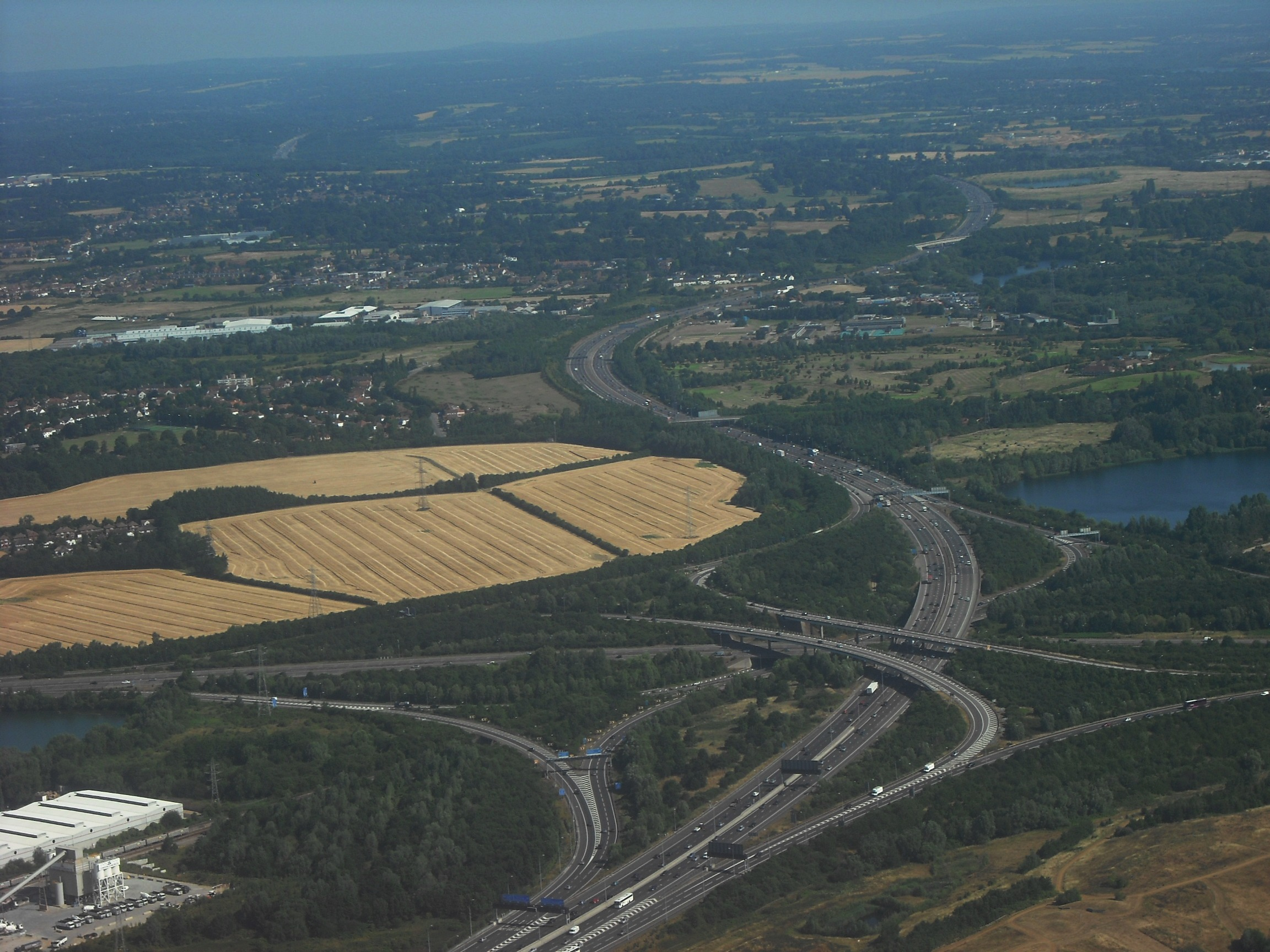
- Thorney Interchange from the south, looking north along the M25 in July 2009; it is junction 15 of the M25
- Interactive map of Thorney Interchange

Location
- Buckinghamshire/Berkshire/Greater London
- Coordinates: 51.495°N 0.495°W
- Roads at junction: M4; M25

Construction
- Type: 4-level stack interchange
- Constructed: by Cementation Company and Costain Group
- Opened: 19 December 1985
- Maintained by: National Highways

The Thorney Interchange is a large motorway intersection in the UK, between the M4 and M25. It is one of the busiest motorway interchanges in the country. It lies on the edges of Buckinghamshire, Greater London (London Borough of Hillingdon) and Berkshire, and is close to Surrey and Staines-upon-Thames.

== History ==
The M4 (London-South Wales Motorway) in this area was opened in December 1964, from junctions 4 (A408) to 5; this 3.9-mile section cost £3.2m, and was built by Cubitts and Green. The interchange, therefore, is junction 4b of the M4.

The M4 route had been fixed in October 19 1960. The Heathrow to Langley section started construction on Tuesday April 16 1963, by Cubitts and Green, to take 21 months, costing £3m, being four miles.

The M25 route from the A30 road to Maple Cross was published in November 1976. The Poyle to Maple Cross M25 enquiry was on October 23 1979.

The interchange is around one mile north-west of Heathrow Airport, and is the main junction for traffic heading from the M25 to the airport. The interchange is the point that the M4 enters Greater London.

=== Design ===
The bridge decks were to be built of prestressed concrete, but instead were built with composite steel beams and concrete decks, designed to BS 5400. In the early 1980s, when the interchange was being built, the entire M25 was to cost around £600m.

The southern part of the M4/M25 interchange was part of a 2.05-mile section of the M25 which was due to open in spring 1985, the Poyle to Thorney Mill Road section, from junction 14 (Poyle Interchange) to junction 15. The £44m contract, given to the joint venture of Cementation/Costain, was to take three years. The M25 section was due to be open nine months before the M4/M25 interchange would open.

The northern section of the interchange was to be part of a 10.5-mile section of the M25 also due to open in spring 1985; this later became the 4-mile M4 to Iver Heath section to the M40, at Denham Interchange, junction 16. The 6.5-mile section of the M25 directly north of the M40 opened in January 1985.

Much of the M25 was designed by Halcrow Group. The interchange was designed by Atkins.

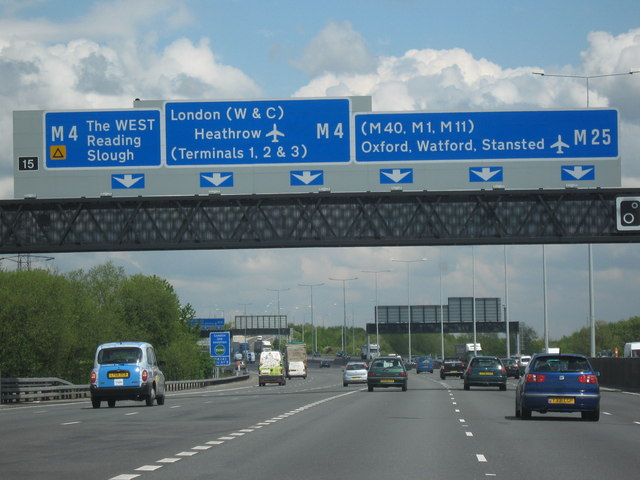
Looking north along the M25 in April 2009

=== Construction ===
3.5m cubic metres of infill was needed for the contoured landscaping.

The section of M25 to the north began construction in April 1983. Construction took 28 months, and cost £25m, with £10m for the fifteen bridges, by Wimpey Construction. The bridges were built to allow expansion to four lanes at a later date. The M25 was opened by Nicholas Ridley, Baron Ridley of Liddesdale on Wednesday 18 September 1985, as an 11-mile section directly south of the M40 to Poyle. The section had cost £80m.

The M4/M25 junction was planned to open at a later date of June 1986, but it opened six months early, due to good weather, on Thursday 19 December 1985. At the time of opening two sections of the M25 remained to be completed in Hertfordshire and Kent (which opened in February 1986), and the M4/M25 junction was expected to be the busiest motorway junction in the UK.

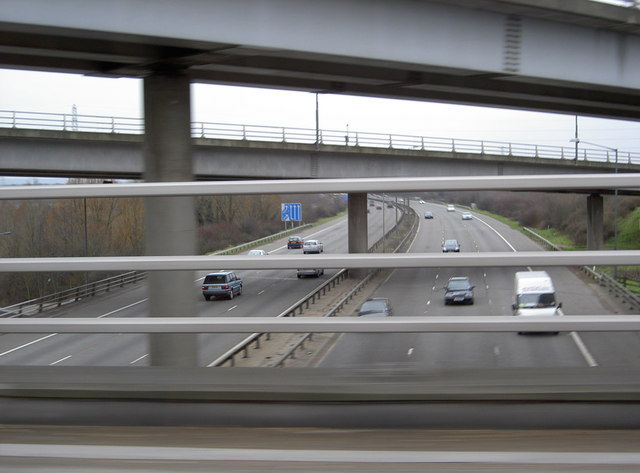
Looking westwards at the centre of the interchange along the M4 westwards, from the M25 north, in February 2007

== Structure ==
It is a typical stack interchange. The part of the interchange that is north of the M4 is in Iver, in South Bucks. It is named after Thorney, Buckinghamshire, now part of Iver, the village in which the northern part of the interchange in situated. The part of the interchange that is south of the M4 is in Colnbrook with Poyle, in Slough. West Drayton and Harmondsworth are close to the east.

There are 11 bridges and three major viaducts, varying from 182m to 264m long. A 229m viaduct carries the M25 over the M4.

A single-track railway line passes through the middle of the interchange from north to south. The only remaining section of the former Staines and West Drayton Railway, it carries freight to the Lakeside industrial estate south of the interchange,

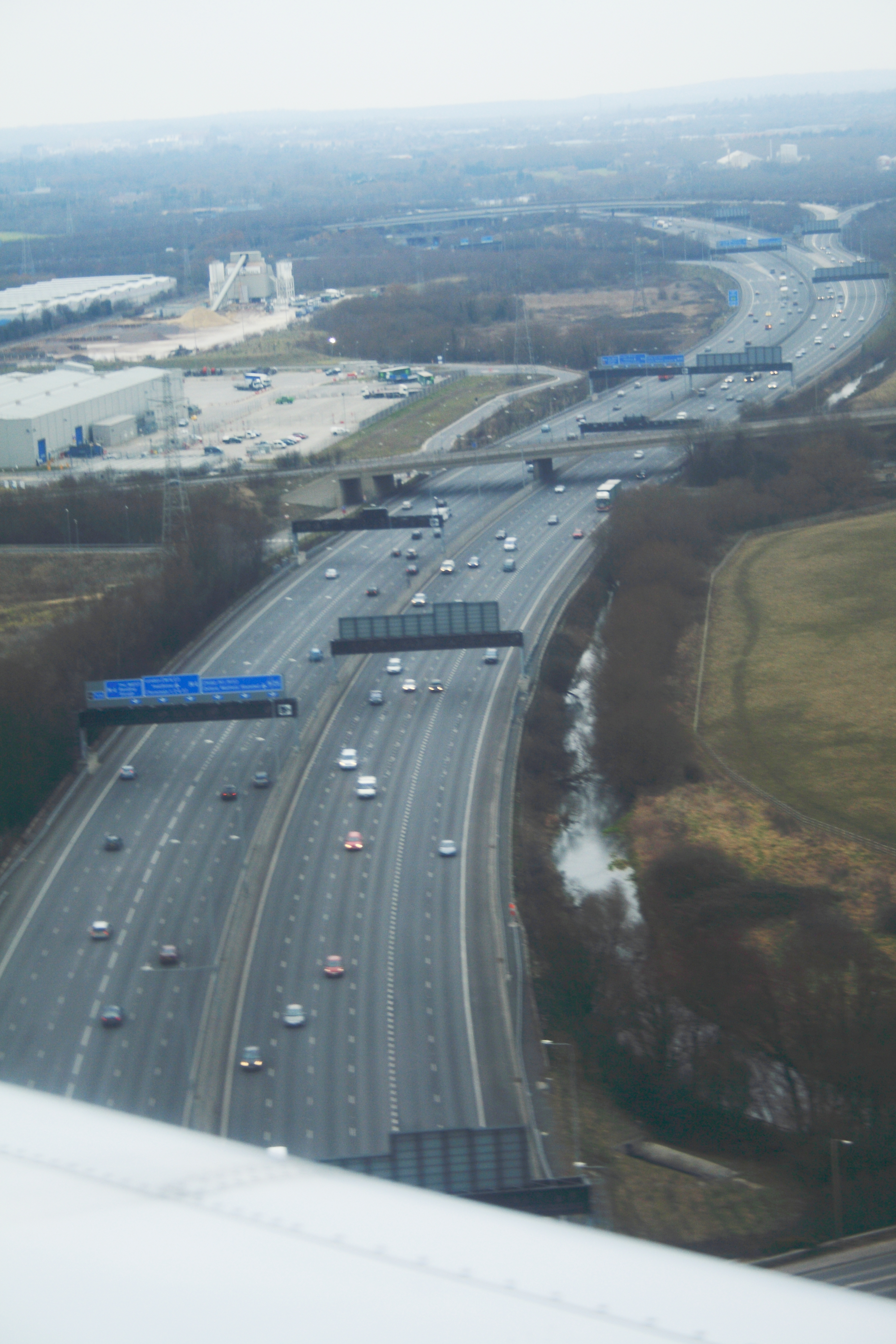
View looking north along the M25 in February 2009
