= Stanwell =

Village and parish in Surrey, England

Coordinates: 51.4570°N 0.4715°W

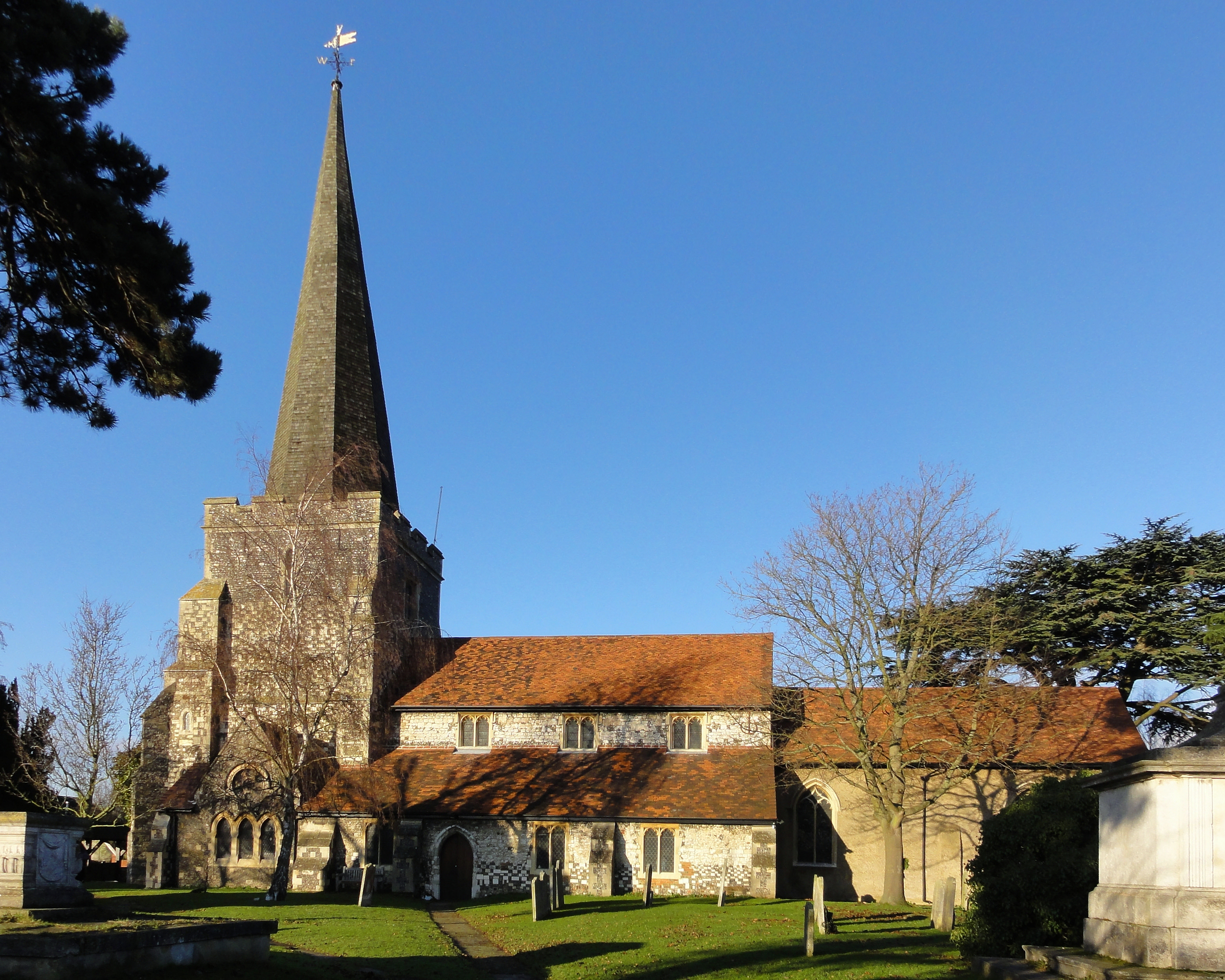
- Parish Church of St Mary the Virgin

- Location within Surrey
- Area: 5.13 km^{2} (1.98 sq mi)
- Population: 11,279 (2011 census)
  - Density: 2,199/km^{2} (5,700/sq mi)
- OS grid reference: TQ055735
- District: Spelthorne
- Shire county: Surrey
- Region: South East
- Country: England
- Sovereign state: United Kingdom
- Post town: Staines-upon-Thames
- Postcode district: TW19
- Dialling code: 01784
- Police: Surrey
- Fire: Surrey
- Ambulance: South East Coast
- UK Parliament: Spelthorne

Stanwell is a village in the Spelthorne district, in Surrey, England. It is 16 miles (26 km) west of central London. A small corner of its land is used as industrial land for nearby Heathrow Airport. The rest of the village is made up of residential and recreational land. Historically part of the county of Middlesex, it has, like the rest of Spelthorne, been in Surrey since 1965. The village is to the south of the cargo-handling area of Heathrow Airport and to the east of the Staines Reservoirs. Stanwell is the northernmost settlement in Surrey, bordering Berkshire and Greater London.

Its recognisable extent has been substantially cut three times – all in the 20th century. Land was taken for reservoirs in about 1900; a few decades later land was taken into Heathrow Airport; and in 1995, after the completion of the M25 motorway, the settlement of Poyle (beyond Stanwell Moor) was detached from the Borough and reassigned to Colnbrook in the Borough of Slough.

Stanwell Moor is near the village and has multiple reservoirs around it. It was recognised as a manor in medieval times. It has a few pasture/horse-riding fields, horticultural businesses and flood meadows. It is centred 1 mile (1.6 km) from the historical nucleus of Stanwell and is part of the same ward and ecclesiastical parish.

== History ==
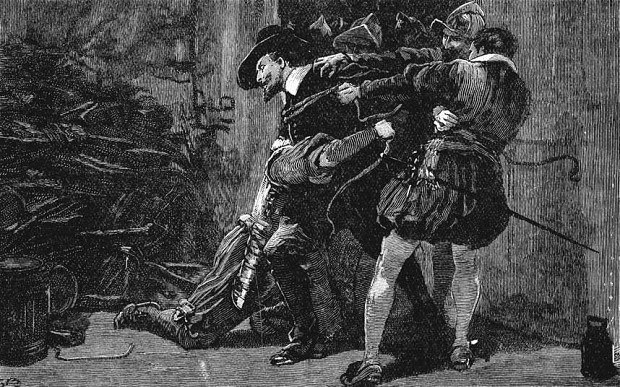
The first secular (and non-royal) owner, of the land representing most of Staines and Stanwell since the Norman Conquest, was Thomas Knyvet, 1st Baron Knyvet. He arrested Guy Fawkes in the cellar of the Houses of Parliament when Fawkes was planting explosives to kill King James VI and I and was convicted of high treason, while rough justice was dispensed on others alleged to have conspired. Knyvet's actions, and those of a Roman Catholic peer who was forewarned, and of Edward Doubleday in preventing this plot from succeeding, are celebrated annually on Bonfire Night. Knyvet often stayed at his earlier acquisition at Stanwell Manor, Stanwell, and rented Knyvett House, on the site of what later became 10 Downing Street, Westminster.

There are two theories regarding the origin of the name Stanwell. One is that it was named after St Ann(e)'s well in the village, but according to all known records the parish church has always been dedicated to St Mary. The second is that it means 'stone well', referring to stony soil or the adjoining street to the south. The first few letters of the name are the same as in the name of neighbouring Staines-upon-Thames, which also is said to mean 'stones', in the same way as the Great Vowel Shift failed to influence the spelling and pronunciation of the contemporaneously pronounced Stane Streets (i.e. stone streets), the Old English for many of the stone-laid Roman roads in Britain

The Domesday Book of 1086 records 'Stanwelle' held by Walter, son of Othere. This places it among the large minority of head manors retained by men with Anglo-Saxon names. Its Domesday assets were: 15 hide, 4 mills worth £3 10s 0d and 375 eels, 3 weirs worth 1000 eels, 10 ploughs, meadow for 12 ploughs and woodland worth 12 hogs. It rendered £14 per year to its feudal system overlords. The fruitful watercourse was the western border of the village and of Middlesex, the River Colne West Bedfont may have been a hamlet of Stanwell in 1086; however, the dividing line between West Bedfont hamlet in Stanwell parish and East Bedfont in the parish of Bedfont (now in Greater London) may not have been drawn before the 11th or 12th century. West Bedfont along with Rudsworth are no longer used by residents (as localities, hamlets, neighbourhoods). In the Middle Ages the parish was mostly open fields

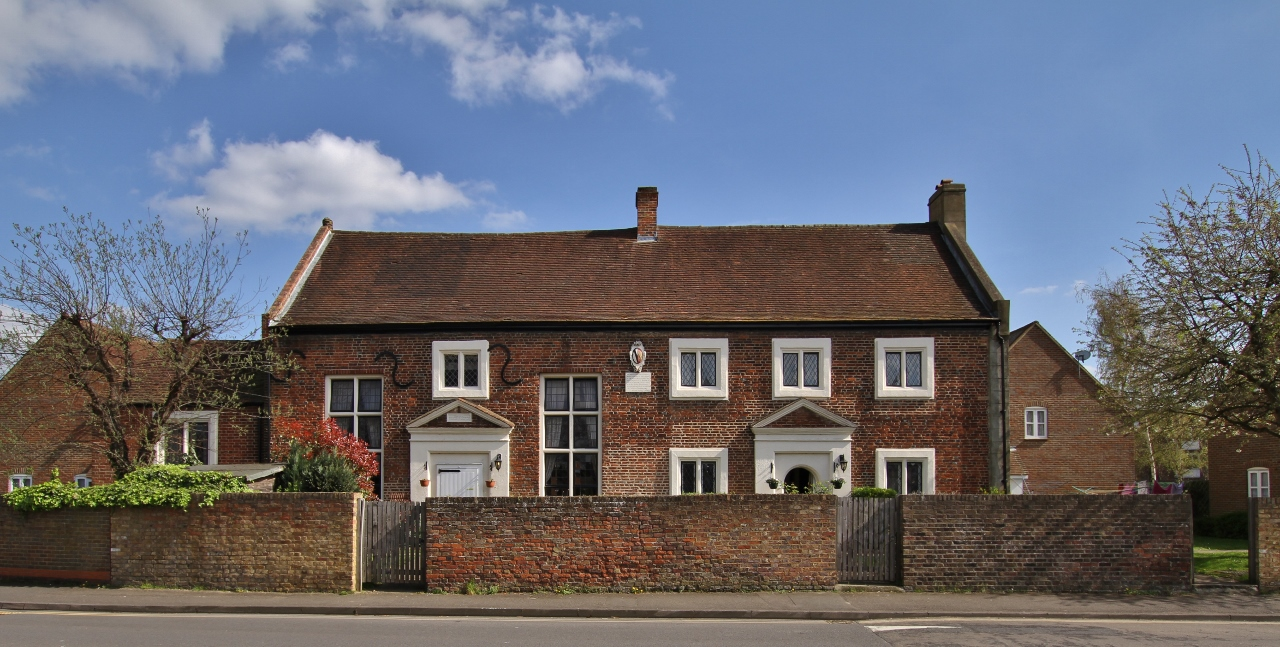
Building of the former Free School founded by Thomas Knyvett

In 1603, Thomas Knyvet was granted the manor of Stanwell. Knyvet was the man who arrested Guy Fawkes in his attempt to blow up the Houses of Parliament. He was created Lord Knyvet in 1607, and in his will left money to found a free school in Stanwell, which was established in 1624. The building is no longer a school and now belongs to a housing association. It is Grade II* listed. However Thomas Knyvett College, bears his name in the twenty-first century.

James VI and I's infant daughter Mary died at Stanwell while in the care of the Knyvet household. Several members of the aristocracy lived there in the 17th and 18th centuries. The Cox's Orange Pippin was first grown c. 1830 by Richard Cox in his garden on the Bath Road within the parish, see Colnbrook which now has this piece of land.

An unknown species of rose was found in a local garden in 1838, and given the name of Stanwell Perpetual.

Hounslow Heath extended over the area north of Bedfont Road until 1792, and a strip of moorland (Borough Green and Spout Moor) along the present Spout Lane joined it to Hither Moor and Farther Moor, which stretched towards Staines Moor. There were lammas lands in the far east and elsewhere and meadows along many of the river banks, particularly in the north, but the remainder of the parish was largely arable land. Nearly all the land west of Stanwell Moor's clustered centre and that around Hammonds Farm was enclosed by the mid-18th century. Borough Field, to the north and west of the manor-house, and another small field nearby were inclosed in 1771 by the lord of the manor. Most of the area south of Stanwell and West Bedfont villages remained open until 1792 on their enclosure.

By the 18th century the remaining common land was generally known as Stanwell Field or Town Field until its enclosure. Orchards and market gardens began to spread over the parish in the second half of the 19th century. The Staines and West Drayton Railway (now closed) was opened in 1884, with Colnbrook railway station in Stanwell parish at Poyle, after the then neighbouring village. The streets of small houses behind the southwest Crooked Billet roundabout (named after a demolished pub) were built in the 1880s. As a community they formed part of Staines, and were transferred to it officially in 1896.

The Staines Union Workhouse was built on the London Road in the mid-19th century. Together with a former boys' home and a former isolation hospital, both opened about 1913, it became Ashford Hospital. Two cemeteries were opened near the A30 between 1895 and 1910. The Staines Reservoirs were completed in 1902 and started supplying water to London in 1904. Between them they cover 440 acres (180 ha).

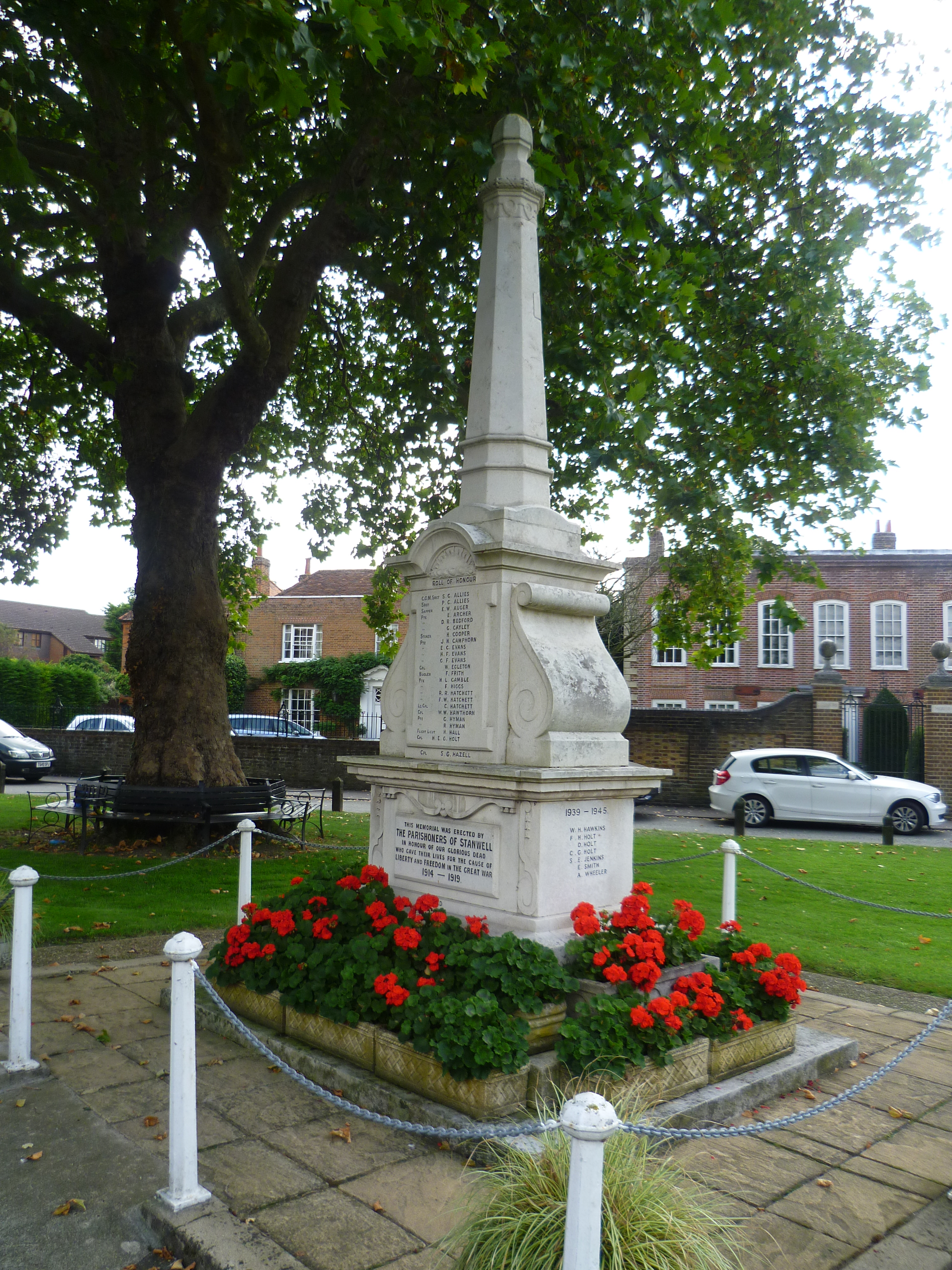
War memorial on Stanwell Village Green

The two old settlements grew slightly, notably by the building of council housing estates in Stanwell in 1919 and in Stanwell Moor in 1930. A private motor-bus served the village by 1926, and London Transport buses began in 1932. Poyle Halt on the defunct railway opened in 1927 and Poyle Industrial Estate Halt in 1953. Housing society and council house building began after the Second World War, including 300 pre-fabricated homes. From 1930, having formed part of a 19th-century Sanitary District then Rural District, Stanwell was administered by Staines Urban District (of the county of Middlesex) until its 1974 dissolution. In 1965 were it not for special provision Stanwell would have seceded with the rest of Middlesex to London: the Staines, Sunbury and Potters Bar Urban Districts transferred variously to Surrey and Hertfordshire, the most distant parts of the county from London.

The civil parish, with its wider functions than those surviving today. It was relatively active; it intervened with partial success in the negotiations for the building of the reservoirs and saw the provision of allotments in 1918 and of a recreation ground in 1927. Its first complaint about dangerous driving along the London Road was made in 1909. In addition to the overseer, who was unpaid, the council had two salaried assistant overseers, one of whom was also clerk to the council and the other of whom was the rate collector. The council protested against the inclusion of Stanwell in Staines Urban District, which nevertheless took place, so that the council was dissolved. In 1951 the parish had a population of 8148. On 1 April 1974 the parish was abolished.

=== On Heathrow's construction ===
In the northwest of the parish, off Spout Lane, Middlesex County Council established 24 small holdings in the early 1930s: Burrows Hill Close estate and Bedfont Court. The part of Stanwell New Road north of Park Road opened as a main north–south route in 1948. The following year, most of the former Hounslow Heath land to the north-east, predominantly in Harmondsworth, became London Airport. The east end of the local road to Bedfont was diverted, and the roads running north were turned over, together with the eastern half of Spout Lane, where houses were demolished.

In 2004, the village of Stanwell won a bronze medal in the national Britain in Bloom competition, in the urban community category.

== Notable buildings ==
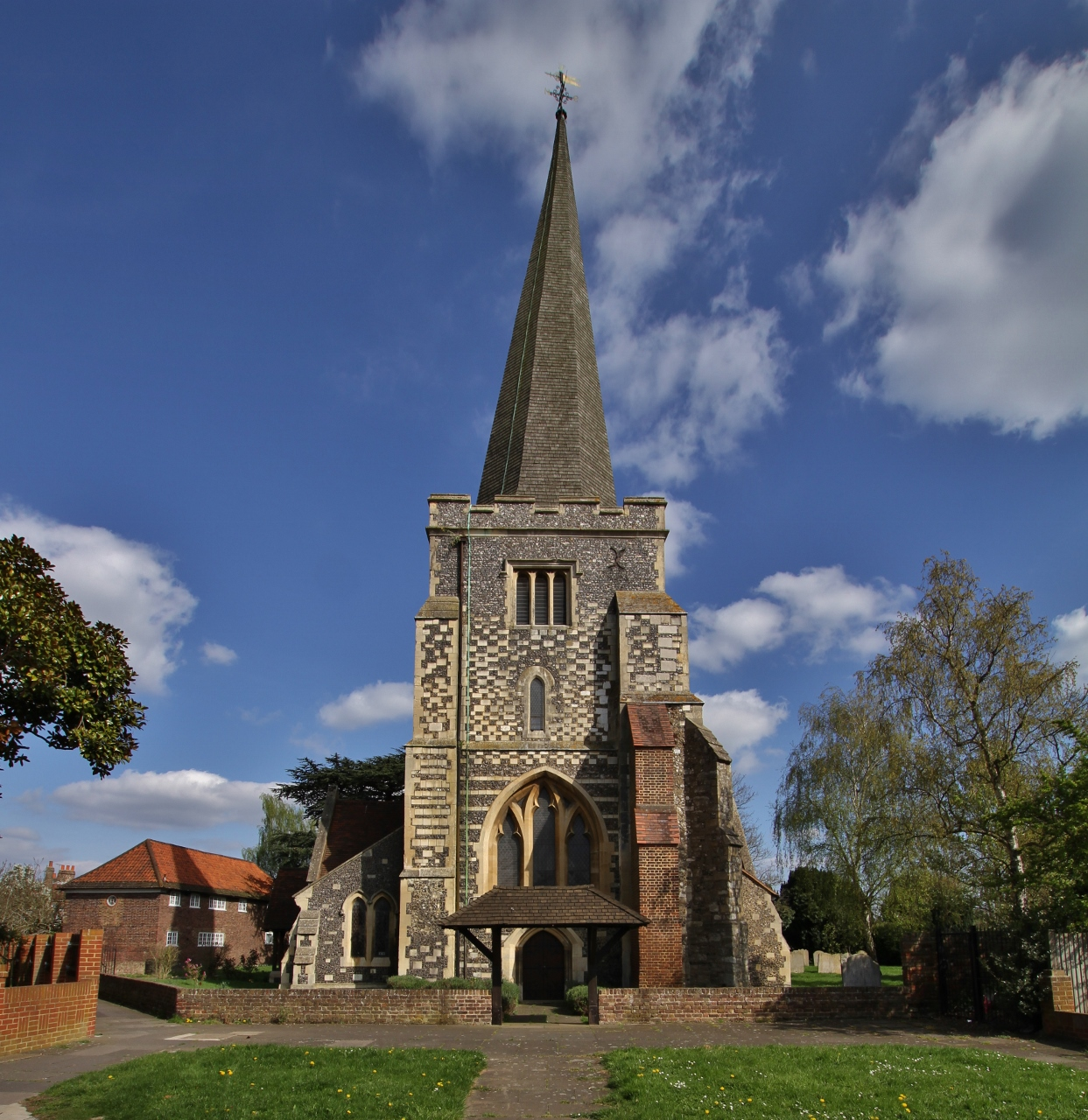
Parish church of St Mary the Virgin, seen from the west

=== Parish church ===
The Church of England parish church of St Mary the Virgin is a Norman building with a 14th-century Gothic chancel and 15th-century Perpendicular Gothic west tower. The tower has a spire with wood shingles. Inside the church are monuments to members of the Knyvet(t) family who bought Staines manor after their foiling of the planting of the gunpowder and Fawkes.

The church was restored in 1862 under the direction of Samuel Sanders Teulon, and restored again in 1903. The building is Grade I listed.

=== Stanwell Place ===
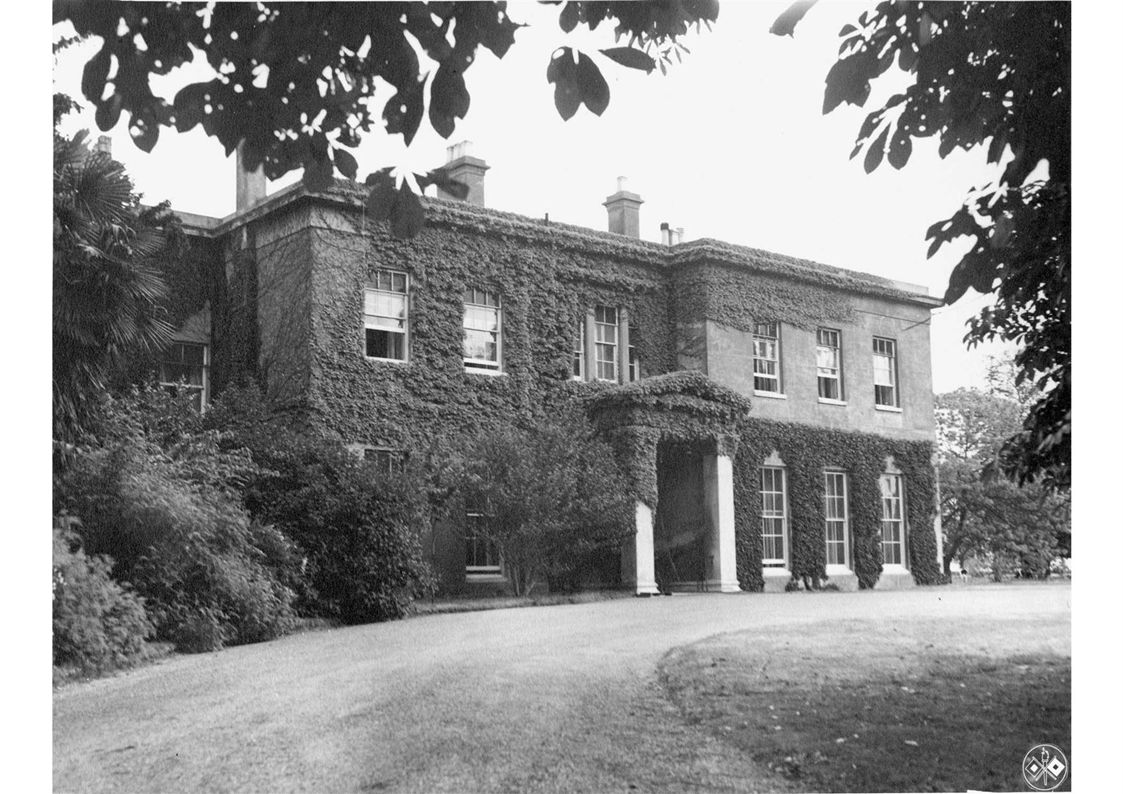
Stanwell Place

Stanwell Place was a grand manor house from the 17th century 0.5 miles (0.80 km) west of the village church, north of Park Road. The Gibbons family owned the manorial rights from 1754 to 1933, and slowly sold off the estate from the 1800s. Sold to John Watson Gibson in 1933, four years later 330 acres (1.3 km^{2}) were sold off to the Metropolitan Water Board for the development of the King George VI Reservoir, now in Staines. After Gibson's death in 1947, Stanwell Place was sold to King Faisal II of Iraq who owned it until his assassination in 1958. The estate was then purchased for gravel extraction, and despite local attempts to prevent it, the house was allowed to become derelict, and demolished in the 1960s.

== Economy ==
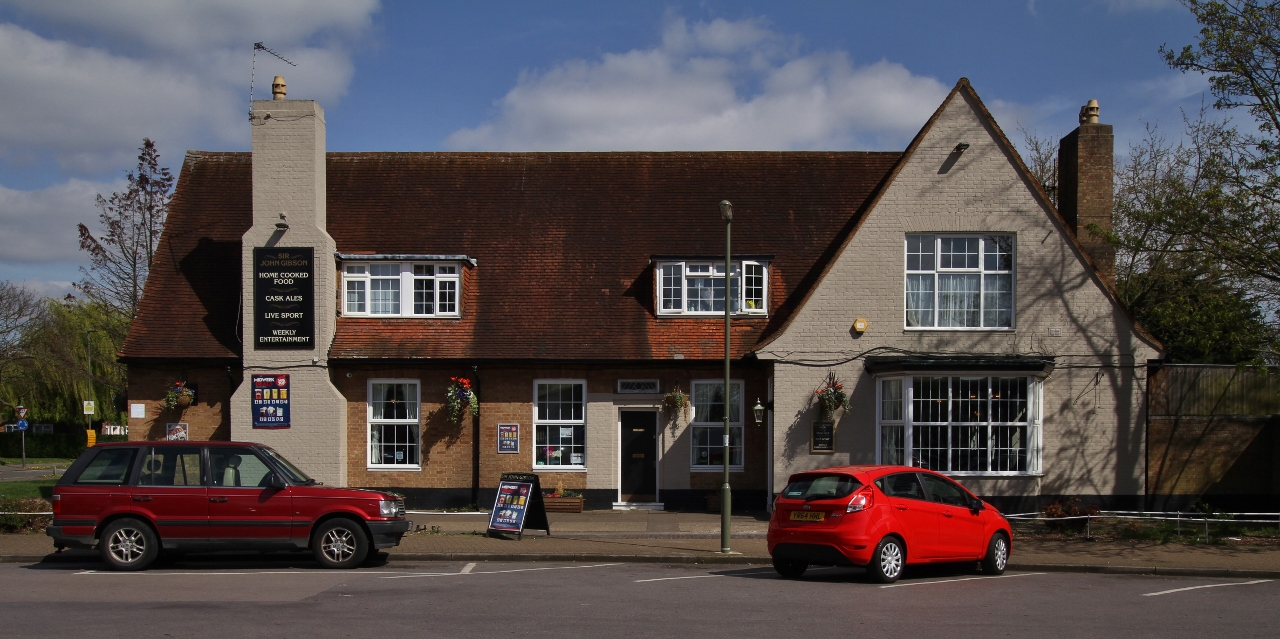
The Sir John Gibson (formerly The Happy Landing), a pub in central Stanwell.

What was the north of the parish is a major industrial, distribution and headquarters zone, bound up now in the broad expression 'the M4 corridor'. There was little building in the parish before World War I. The first factory/warehouse at Poyle appeared before 1914 another at West Bedfont in the 1920s. By 1956 there were between 70 and 80 at Poyle, and several at West Bedfont. During the 1920s and 1930s ribbon development spread along the main roads: on the A4 Bath Road Colnbrook remains mainly residential. Garages and a few small factories (now motor manufacturer garages and offices) had been built by the 1950s and remain along the A30 London Road, including Del Monte, Ford and Suzuki.

At one time British Mediterranean Airways was headquartered at the Cirrus House within the post town but in the London Borough of Hounslow, near Stanwell.

== Transport ==
The nearest railway stations are Ashford (Surrey) railway station, 2 miles (3.2 km) south of Stanwell High Street, and Heathrow Terminal 4 railway station, 2 miles (3.2 km) east. Heathrow Terminal 4 is also served by the Piccadilly line of London Underground.

Stanwell High Street itself is served by minimal public transport provision, of bus routes that run only once or twice a day. However, Clare Road to the east of Stanwell is served regularly (three buses an hour) by London Buses route 203 between Hounslow and Staines, as well as by route 442 half-hourly between Heathrow Terminal 5 and Staines operated by local bus company Carlone Ltd.

== Politics ==
Stanwell has historically been one of the few wards of Surrey County Council held by the Labour Party.

== Demography and housing ==
2011 Census Homes
| Output area | Detached | Semi-detached | Terraced | Flats and apartments | Caravans/temporary/mobile homes | Shared between households |
|---|---|---|---|---|---|---|
| Stanwell | 332 | 1,602 | 1,257 | 1,316 | 5 | 36 |

The average level of accommodation in the region composed of detached houses was 28%, the average that was apartments was 22.6%.

| Output area | Population | Households | % Owned outright | % Owned with a loan | Area (hectares) |
|---|---|---|---|---|---|
| Stanwell | 11,279 | 4,548 | 22.4 | 33.0 | 513 |

The proportion of households in the settlement who owned their home outright compares to the regional average of 35.1%. The proportion who owned their home with a loan compares to the regional average of 32.5%. The remaining % is made up of rented dwellings (plus a negligible % of households living rent-free).

== Notable residents ==
- Thomas Knyvet, 1st Baron Knyvet, Member of Parliament in 1601, was granted the manor of Stanwell for uncovering the Gunpowder Plot in 1603
- Nicholas Hilliard, painter, leased Poyle Manor
- James Nares, English organist and composer, was born in Stanwell in 1715 and married Teresa Costello
- Richard Cox, British horticulturist, created Cox's Orange Pippin apple, first grown in his garden on the Bath Road
- Sir John Watson Gibson, civil engineer, lived in Stanwell Lodge and then Stanwell Place between the 1920s and his death in 1947 Since 2015, one of the town's pubs has borne his name
- Sir Allen Lane, the founder of Penguin Books, lived at Silverbeck, Stanwell Moor
- King Faisal II of Iraq owned Stanwell Place from 1948 until his assassination in 1958
- Gary Numan, singer, was raised in Stanwell and attended Stanwell Secondary School (later merged with Abbotsford School)
- Pete Shaw, author and theatrical producer, was raised in Short Lane, Stanwell

== See also ==
- Middlesex
  - Spelthorne Hundred
- Stanwell Park, New South Wales

== Sources ==
- Reynolds, Susan, ed. (1962). A History of the County of Middlesex. Victoria County History. Vol. III. London: Oxford University Press for the Institute of Historical Research. pp. 33–50.
