= Poyle Halt railway station =

Former railway station in England

Coordinates: 51.4687°N 0.5108°W

Poyle for Stanwell Moor Halt

General information
- Location: Poyle, Spelthorne; England
- Grid reference: TQ035754
- Platforms: 1

Other information
- Status: Disused

History
- Original company: Great Western Railway
- Post-grouping: Great Western Railway

Key dates
- 1 June 1927: Opened as Stanwell Moor and Poyle Halt
- 26 September 1927: Renamed Poyle for Stanwell Moor Halt
- 29 March 1965: Closed
Location

Poyle for Stanwell Moor Halt railway station was on the outskirts of London, on the now closed line of the Staines and West Drayton Railway.

It opened on 1 June 1927 to serve the village of Poyle; originally named Stanwell Moor and Poyle Halt, it was renamed Poyle for Stanwell Moor Halt on 26 September the same year. It closed on 29 March 1965, when passenger services on the line ceased. The line north of Colnbrook remains open for goods services. The M25 runs near and over much of the branch south of the station. Part of the former route is involved in the Heathrow Airtrack proposal to connect Staines with Heathrow Airport. It should not be confused with Poyle Estate Halt, a small station to the north of it which opened in 1954 to serve the nearby industrial estate, and which also closed in 1965.

The Staines-West Drayton route never attracted many passengers as the hoped-for growth at the villages of Colnbrook, Poyle and Yeoveney did not occur.

| Preceding station | Disused railways | Following station |
|---|---|---|
| Yeoveney Halt | Staines & West Drayton Railway; Staines West branch | Poyle Estate Halt |
