= Alder Bourne =

Stream in Buckinghamshire, England

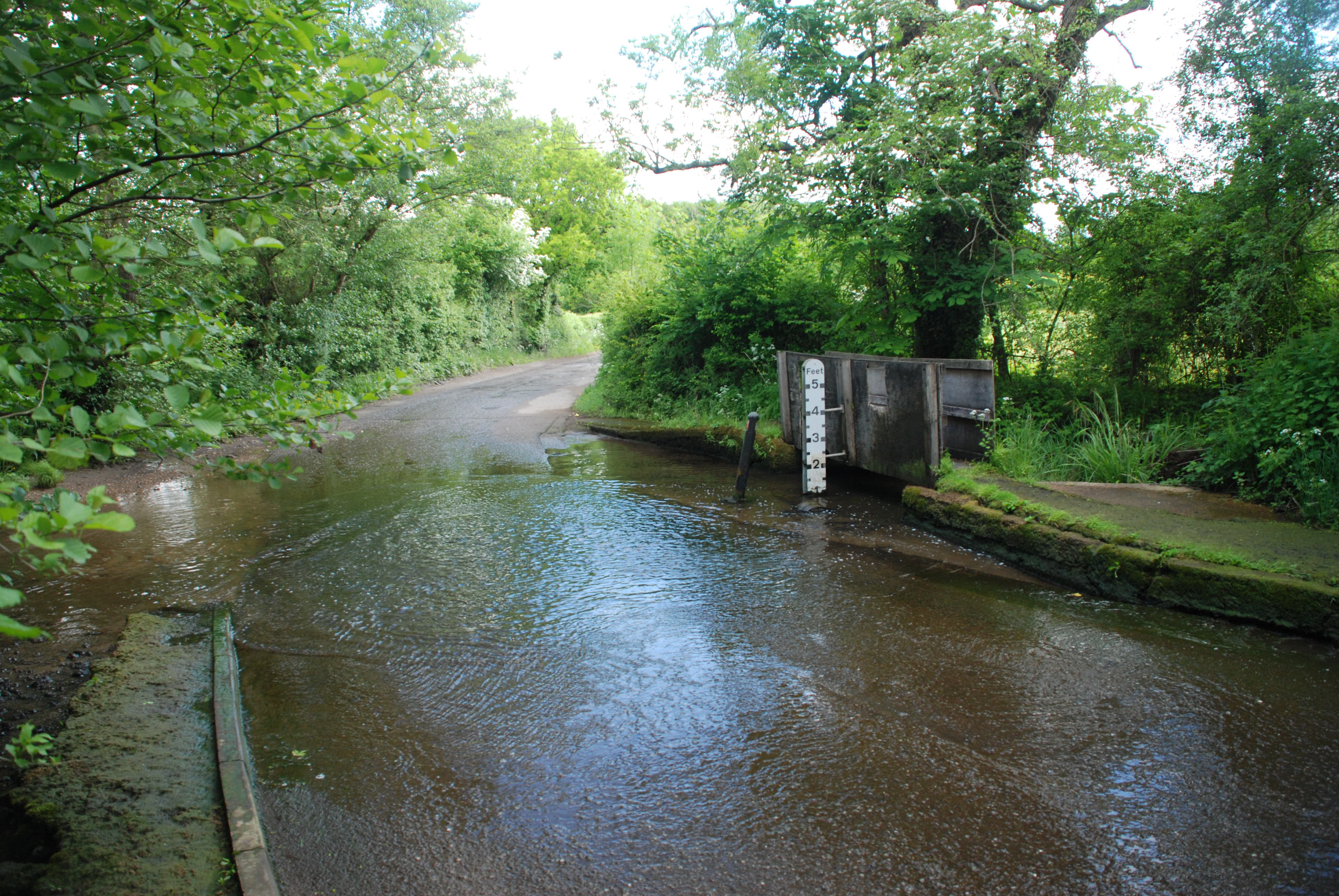
- Ford of the Alder Bourne in Fulmer

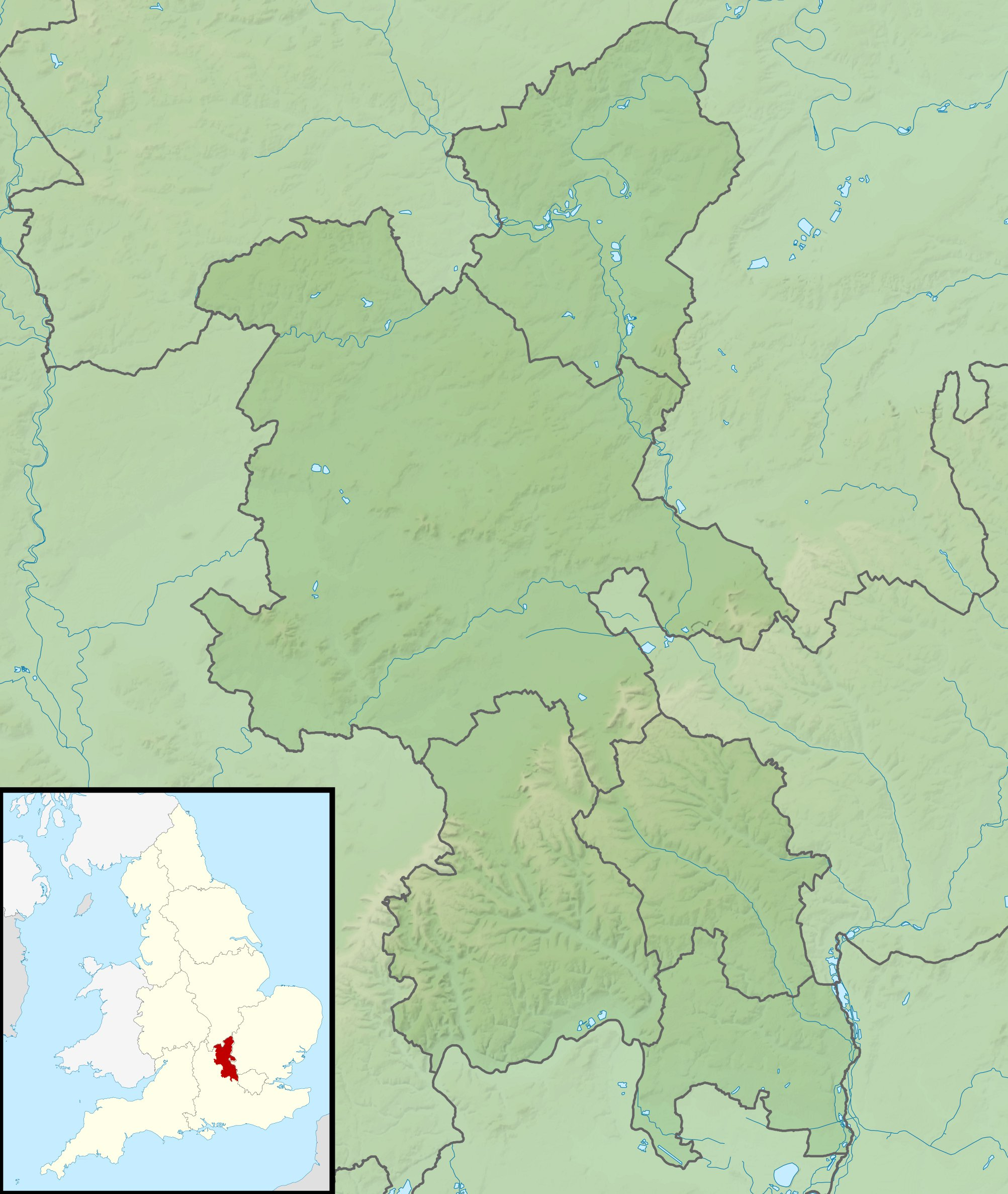
- Inflow to the Colne Brook, West of Uxbridge
- Course of the Alder Bourne

Location
- Country: England
- Counties: Buckinghamshire (ceremonial)
- Parishes: Fulmer, Iver

Physical characteristics
- Source
  - location: Fulmer, Buckinghamshire, United Kingdom
  - coordinates: 51°33′42″N 0°32′55″W
- Mouth: Colne Brook
  - location: Iver, Buckinghamshire, United Kingdom
  - coordinates: 51°32′14″N 0°30′06″W
  - elevation: 33 m (108 ft)
- Length: 6.847 km (4.255 mi)

Basin features
- Progression: Alder Bourne, Colne Brook, Thames
- River system: Thames Basin

The Alder Bourne is a winterbourne stream in the south of Buckinghamshire, England. It rises north-west of Fulmer and flows into the Colne Brook.
