= Yeoveney Halt railway station =

Disused railway halt on the Staines and West Drayton Railway

Coordinates: 51.4496°N 0.5216°W

Yeoveney Halt
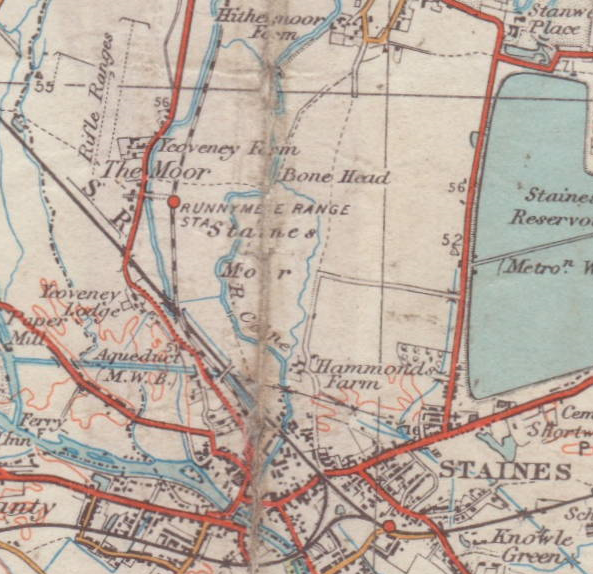

General information
- Location: Staines-upon-Thames, Spelthorne; England
- Grid reference: TQ028733
- Platforms: 1

Other information
- Status: Disused

History
- Original company: Staines & West Drayton Railway
- Pre-grouping: Great Western Railway
- Post-grouping: Great Western Railway

Key dates
- June 1887: Opened as Runemede Range Halt (private station)
- 1 March 1892: Public opening
- 9 July 1934: Renamed Runemede Halt
- 4 November 1935: Renamed Yeoveney Halt
- 14 May 1962: Closed
Location

Yeoveney Halt was a railway platform of a minimalist nature on the Staines & West Drayton Railway (which became part of the Great Western Railway in 1900). It was opened in June 1887 as Runemede Range Halt on a restricted basis (as a private facility for a nearby rifle range), gaining a regular public service from 1 March 1892. It was renamed Runemede Halt on 9 July 1934, and again renamed Yeoveney Halt on 4 November 1935, to deter tourists who came seeking the place where Magna Carta was signed (which was some distance away by road; the station is depicted on some maps as Runnymede Range Station). It closed on 14 May 1962, before the 1965 closure of the branch.

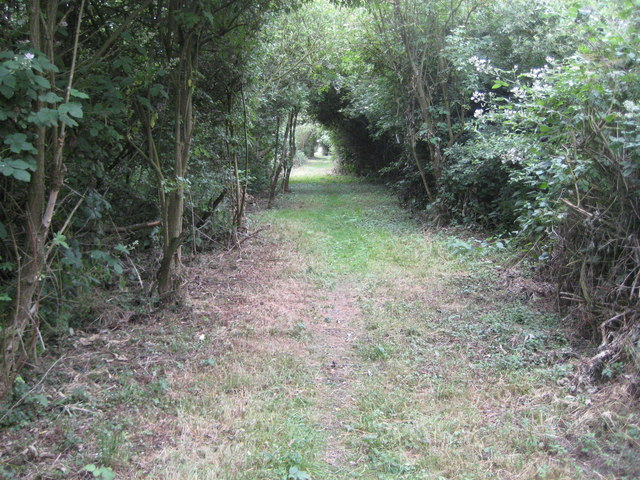
Station site in 2010.

It comprised a short timber platform on the west side of the single track with no shelter. Bradshaw stated that passengers wishing to join the train had to give the driver the necessary (but unspecified) hand signal. Those wishing to alight were to inform the guard at the previous station.

Contrary to the general belief that the site of the station lies beneath the M25 motorway it can be identified by the remaining scattered concrete platform support pillars in the location shown on old Ordnance Survey maps.

Pictures of the station are to be found in

- GWR Country Stations 2: C.Leigh 1984 Ian Allan ISBN 0-7110-1438-8
- London's Local Railways: A.A.Jackson 2nd Ed 1999 Capital Transport Publishing ISBN 978-1-85414-209-2
- Branch Lines of West London: V. Mitchell & K. Smith 2000 Middleton Press ISBN 978-1-901706-50-5

Preceding station	Disused railways	Following station
Staines West	Staines & West Drayton Railway; Staines West branch	Poyle Halt
