= Colnbrook railway station =

Railway station in London, England

Coordinates: 51.48066°N 0.50807°W

Colnbrook
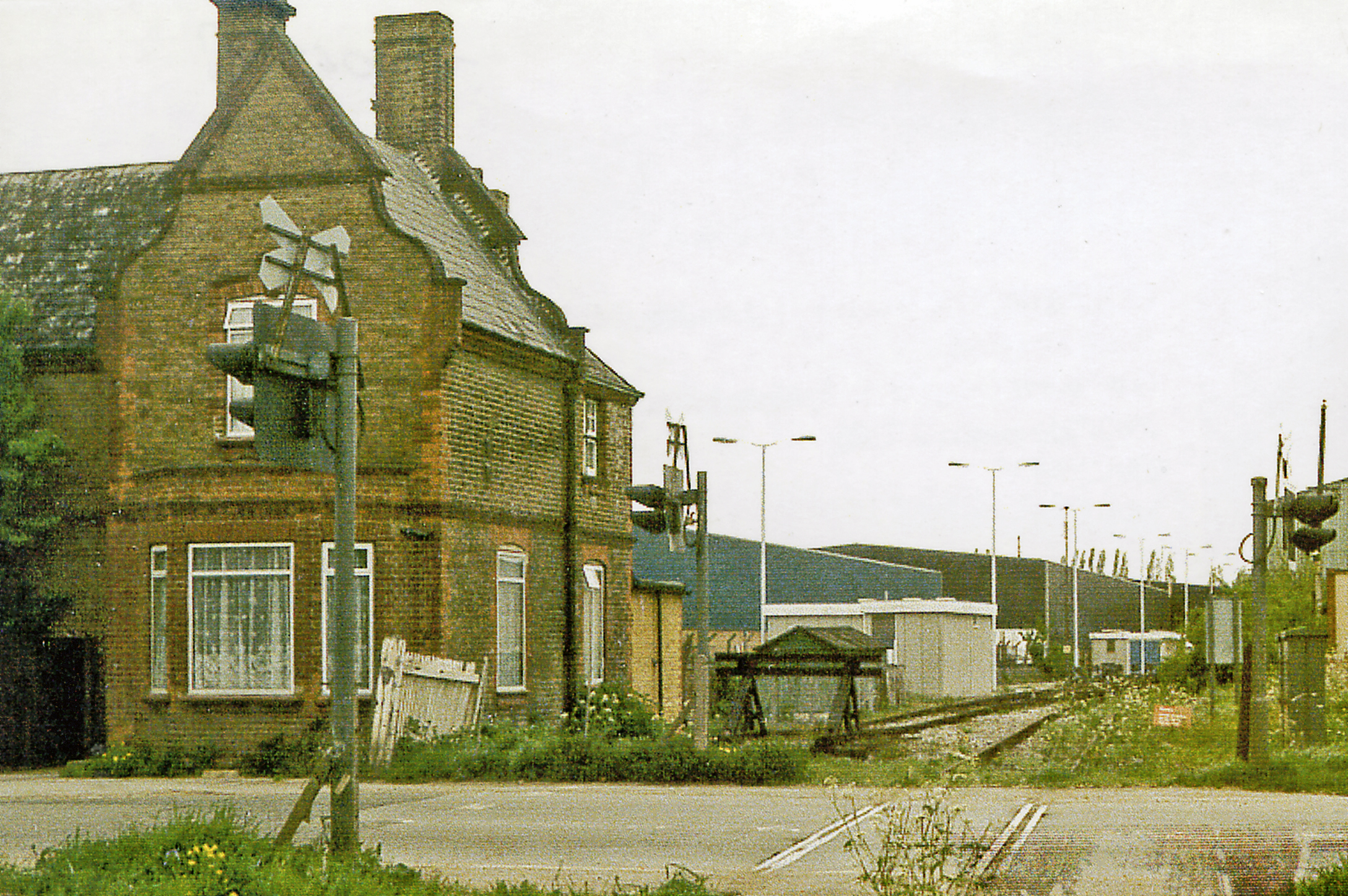
- Remains of the station in 1986

General information
- Location: Poyle, Slough; England
- Grid reference: TQ036767
- Platforms: 2

Other information
- Status: Disused

History
- Original company: Staines and West Drayton Railway
- Pre-grouping: Great Western Railway
- Post-grouping: GWR

Key dates
- 9 August 1884: Station opened
- 29 March 1965: Station closed
Location

Colnbrook railway station was a station on the now-closed railway line between West Drayton and Staines West, on the western edge of London, England. It opened in 1884 to serve the village of Colnbrook, perhaps anticipating that one day it would grow into a larger settlement. It was located on the original route of the Great Bath Road, and under the present flight path near the end of one of Heathrow Airport's main runways.

Although passenger traffic was fairly minimal, the station was not closed to passengers until 1965 (following the Beeching Report). Goods services were withdrawn the following year, but part of the line still remains in use for aggregates traffic and for deliveries to a fuel terminal serving the nearby Heathrow Airport. The platforms survived for quite a while after closure, but have now been demolished. The station house still stands, but the track beyond the former station level crossing towards Poyle has been lifted.

Part of the route may be reused for the proposed Heathrow Airtrack link between Staines and Heathrow Airport. Between 1961 and 1965, the small Colnbrook Estate Halt was opened to the north to serve the industrial estate there.

Preceding station	Disused railways	Following station
Poyle Estate Halt; Line and station closed	Staines & West Drayton Railway; Staines West branch	Colnbrook Estate Halt; Line and station closed
