= Poyle Estate Halt railway station =

Former railway station in England

Coordinates: 51.4746°N 0.5098°W

Poyle Estate Halt
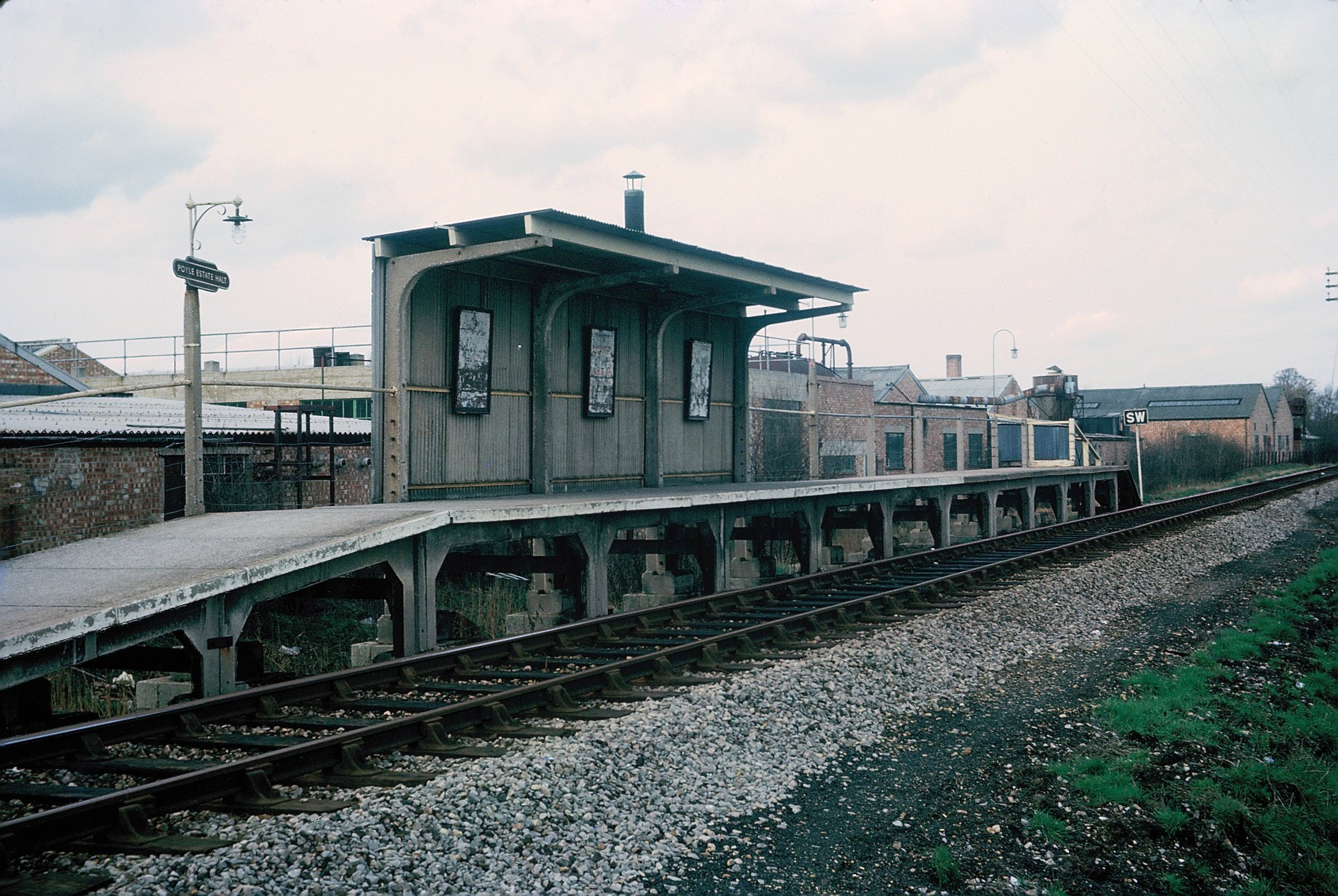
- The site of the station in 1965

General information
- Location: Poyle, Slough; England
- Grid reference: TQ035761
- Platforms: 1

Other information
- Status: Disused

History
- Original company: Western Region of British Railways

Key dates
- 4 January 1954: Opened
- 29 March 1965: Closed
Location

Poyle Estate Halt railway station was opened by the Western Region of British Railways on 4 January 1954 between Colnbrook and Poyle Halt on the Staines West Line. It closed to passengers on 29 March 1965. No relic of it remains.

Preceding station	Disused railways	Following station
Poyle Halt	Western Region of British Railways; Staines West branch	Colnbrook
