= West Drayton railway station =

Railway station in the United Kingdom serving Yiewsley and West Drayton

West Drayton
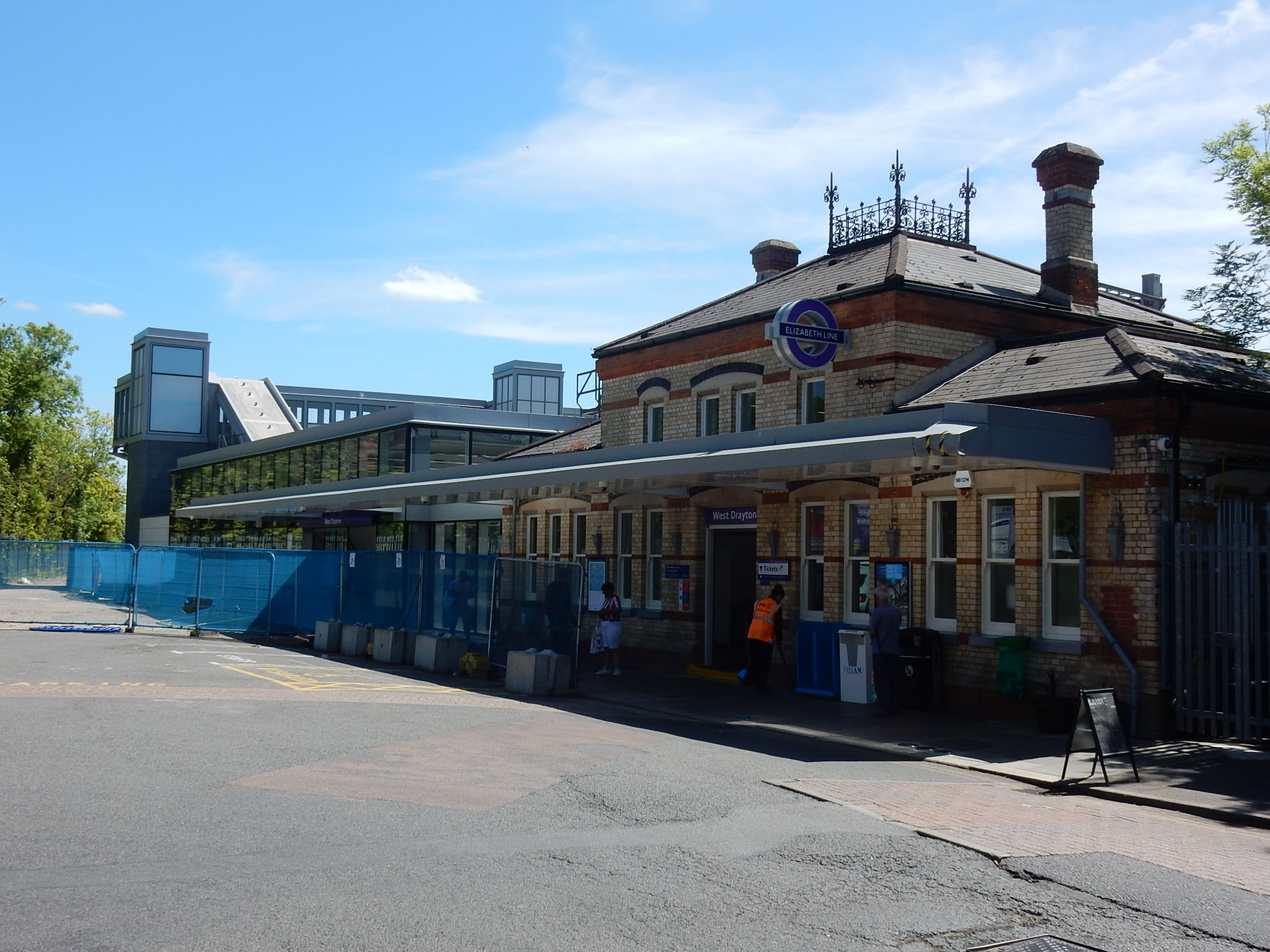
- Station entrance seen in May 2022
- Interactive map of West Drayton

General information
- Location: Yiewsley, London, England
- Local authority: London Borough of Hillingdon
- Managed by: Elizabeth line
- Owner: Network Rail
- Station code: WDT
- DfT category: E
- Number of platforms: 5
- Fare zone: 6

National Rail annual entry and exit
- 2020–21: ▼0.712 million
- 2021–22: ▲1.731 million
- 2022–23: ▲2.262 million
- 2023–24: ▲3.225 million
- 2024–25: ▲3.534 million

Key dates
- 4 June 1838: Original station opened as West Drayton
- 9 August 1884: Station re-sited
- 1895: Renamed West Drayton and Yiewsley
- 6 May 1974: Renamed West Drayton

Other information
- External links: Departures; Facilities
- Coordinates: 51.5099417°N 0.4722639°W

West Drayton railway station serves West Drayton and Yiewsley, western suburbs of London. It is served and managed by the Elizabeth line. It is 13 miles 71 chains (22.3 km) down the line from London Paddington and is situated between Hayes & Harlington to the east and Iver to the west.

== History ==
West Drayton station is on the original line of the Great Western Railway, and was opened on 4 June 1838 at the same time as the line. The original station was located approximately 200 m (660 ft) to the west of the current station and was opened in its current position on 9 April 1884. This was four months before the Staines and West Drayton Railway branch line was opened on 9 August 1884. Initially trains operated as far as Colnbrook, with services to Staines commencing on 2 November 1885. From 1 March 1883, the station was served by District Railway services running between Mansion House and Windsor. The service was discontinued as uneconomic after 30 September 1885.

West Drayton was the junction station for both the Staines branch, and an earlier branch to Uxbridge Vine Street that opened on 8 September 1856. The Uxbridge branch line closed to passengers on 10 September 1962, but the line south of the Grand Union Canal was retained for freight traffic until 8 January 1979. The Staines branch closed to passengers on 29 March 1965, but freight trains still run from West Drayton serving the aviation fuel terminal for Heathrow Airport at Colnbrook and aggregates depots at Thorney and Colnbrook.

From 1895 the station was named West Drayton and Yiewsley; it reverted to the original name West Drayton on 6 May 1974.

In preparation for the introduction of Elizabeth line services, the operation of the station was transferred from Great Western Railway to MTR Crossrail on behalf of Transport for London at the end of 2017.

== Description ==
West Drayton station is situated on Station Approach in Yiewsley. It is north of the centre of West Drayton and immediately to the south of the Grand Union Canal, in the London Borough of Hillingdon.

The station has five platforms. Platform 1 down main line (away from London), platform 2 is the up main line (towards London), platform 3 is the down relief line, platform 4 is the up relief line. A fifth platform on the up goods line is not used for passenger services. This is used for freight services to access the branch line to Colnbrook and also to wait to continue on the up relief line. The platforms on the main lines see little use, other than when the relief lines are closed for maintenance. Access between the platforms is via steps and a pedestrian underpass.

== Crossrail and the Elizabeth line ==
The station received major improvements through the Crossrail construction project in preparation for Elizabeth line services which commenced in May 2022. A new glass and steel extension was built together with a redeveloped main ticket office and new platform canopies. The platforms were extended to be greater than 200 m (660 ft) long, accessed by a new over-platform footbridge with four lifts.

== Services ==
Off-peak, all services at West Drayton are operated by the Elizabeth line using Class 345 EMUs.

The typical off-peak service in trains per hour (tph) is:

- 4 tph to Abbey Wood
- 4 tph to Maidenhead of which 2 continue to Reading

Additional services call at the station during the peak hours, increasing the service to up to 6 tph in each direction.

The station is also served by a small number of early morning and late evening Great Western Railway services between London Paddington and Reading.

Preceding station	Elizabeth line	Following station
Iver towards Reading	Elizabeth line	Hayes & Harlington towards Abbey Wood
National Rail
Iver	Great Western Railway Great Western Main Line Limited Service	Hayes & Harlington
	Historical services	
Preceding station	LUL	Following station
Langley towards Windsor	District line	Hayes & Harlington towards Mansion House
	Disused railways	
Colnbrook Estate Halt Line and station closed	Great Western Railway Staines West Branch	Terminus
Cowley Line and station closed	Great Western Railway Uxbridge Branch	Hayes & Harlington Line and station open

== Connections ==
London Buses routes 222, 350, 698, U1, U3 and U5 serve the station.
