= Colnbrook =

Village in Berkshire, England

Coordinates: 51.4835°N 0.5221°W

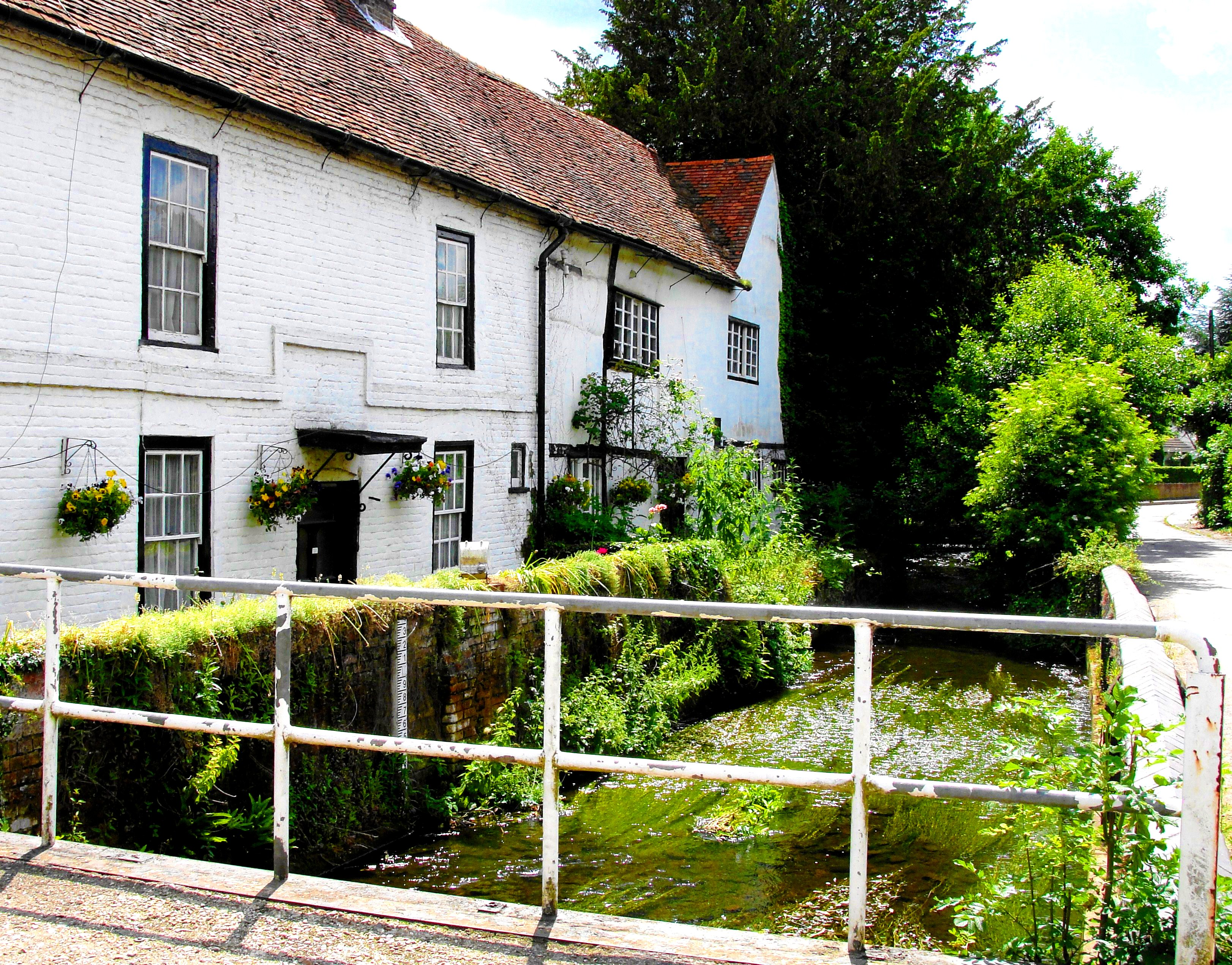
- Bridge over Colne Brook in the village of Colnbrook

- Location within Berkshire
- Population: 6,157
- OS grid reference: SU945805
- Civil parish: Colnbrook with Poyle
- Unitary authority: Slough
- Ceremonial county: Berkshire
- Region: South East
- Country: England
- Sovereign state: United Kingdom
- Post town: SLOUGH
- Postcode district: SL3
- Dialling code: 01753
- Police: Thames Valley
- Fire: Royal Berkshire
- Ambulance: South Central
- UK Parliament: Windsor

Colnbrook is a village in the Slough district in Berkshire, England. It lies within the historic boundaries of Buckinghamshire, and straddles two distributaries of the Colne, the Colne Brook and Wraysbury River. These two streams have their confluence just to the southeast of the village. Colnbrook is centred 3 miles (4.8 km) southeast of the Slough town centre, 4 miles (6.4 km) east of Windsor, and 19 miles (31 km) west of central London.

Colnbrook forms the greater part of the civil parish of Colnbrook with Poyle (see also Poyle). Junctions of the M4 and M25 are near the village. To the east is Longford, London, and Bedfont and Stanwell which abut the south of London Heathrow Airport.

Colnbrook with Poyle is a suburban parish with significant industrial units, logistical premises and open land. The parish was created on 1 April 1995 as an amalgamation of Colnbrook from Iver to the north and the smaller Poyle from an unparished area of Stanwell to the south-east. At the 2011 census the whole civil parish had a population of 6,157 living in 2,533 homes.

== History ==
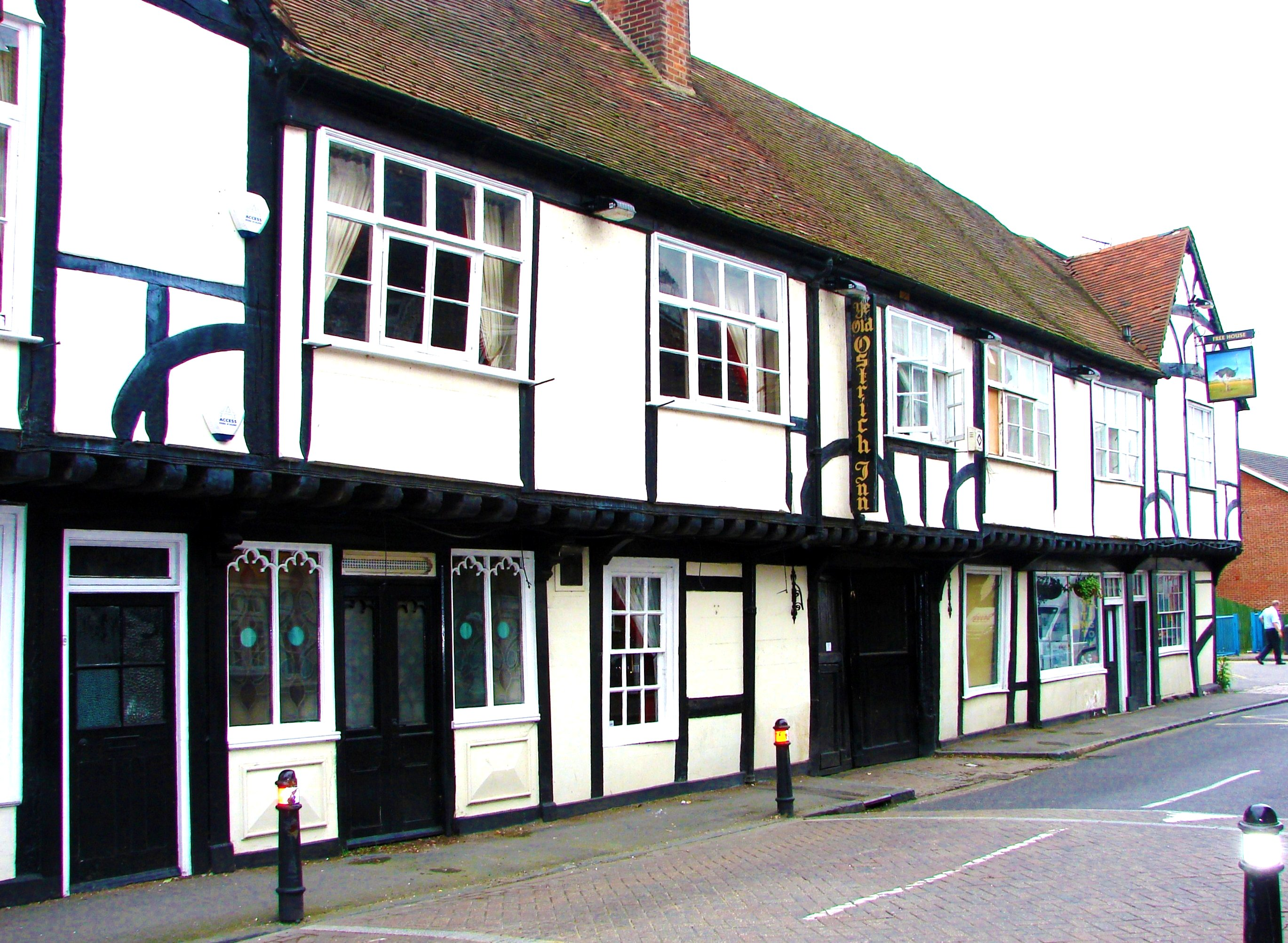
The Ostrich Inn, High Street

Mentioned in William the Conqueror's Domesday Book, Colnbrook is on the Colne Brook, a tributary of the River Colne, hence Colnbrook. Coaching inns were the village's main industry. In 1106, the first one was founded by Milo Crispin, named the Hospice (subsequently the 'Ostrich', probably by way of corruption of the original name), the third oldest in England.

When Princess Elizabeth was brought from Woodstock Palace to Hampton Court in April 1555, she spent a night at The George. By 1577, Colnbrook had no fewer than ten coaching inns. Colnbrook's High Street was on the main London to Bath road and turn off point for Windsor and was used as a resting point for travellers.

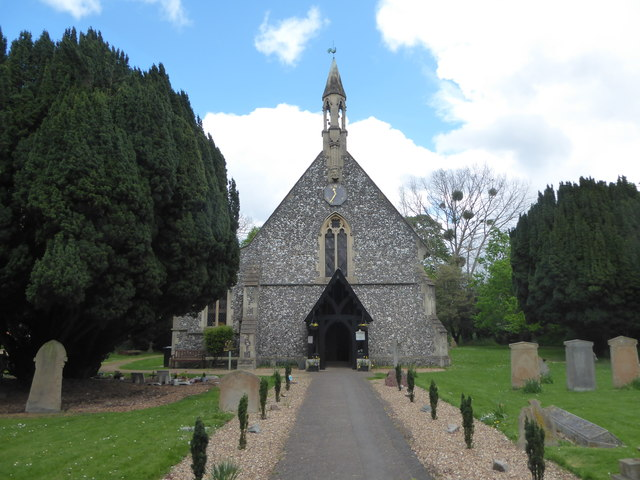
St Thomas's Church

In Thomas Deloney's fictional Pleasant History of Thomas of Reading (c. 1598), Jarman, the landlord of the Crane Inn during the reign of Henry I, installed a large trap door under the bed in the best bedroom located immediately above the inn's kitchen. The bed was fixed to the trap door and the mattress securely attached to the bedstead, so that when two retaining iron pins were removed from below in the small hours of the morning, the sleeping guest was neatly decanted into a boiling cauldron. In this way, more than sixty of his richer guests were murdered silently and with no bloodshed. Their bodies were then disposed of in the River Colne. The murder of a wealthy clothier, Thomas Cole of Reading, proved to be Jarman's undoing in that he failed to get rid of Cole's horse, leading to his confessing. The story ends with Jarman and his wife being hanged for robbery and murder, and the river and town being named "Cole" and "Colebrooke" respectively after Thomas Cole. According to local tradition, this inn was the Ostrich Inn. The inn is reportedly haunted and has been subject to investigations by the Sussex Paranormal Research Group and Most Haunted. On an episode of Ghosthunters International that aired on 21 July 2010, it is mentioned that the Jarman murders at the Ostrich Inn were the inspiration for the story of Sweeney Todd.

Colnbrook is also the place where Richard Cox (a retired brewer), in 1825, first grafted the Cox's Orange Pippin apple at his orchard named The Lawns.

A traditional coaching history has led to no fewer than four inns or public houses remaining, three in Colnbrook, one in Poyle.

In August 1902, a clock was installed by public subscription to celebrate the Coronation of Edward VII and Alexandra, which stood until the building it was attached to was demolished in 1935. The clock was kept in storage for a number of years while several attempts to reinstall it elsewhere were unsuccessful, and it is currently kept inside The Ostrich Inn. In 2012, a new free-standing clock was installed in front of Ye Old George Inn at the end of the High Street to commemorate the Diamond Jubilee of Elizabeth II. The new clock was unveiled on 29 June 2012 in a ceremony attended by Camilla, Duchess of Cornwall.

=== Administrative history ===
Colnbrook has a complicated administrative history. The village was historically divided by the Colne Brook between the ancient parish of Stanwell in Middlesex in the east, and the parishes of Horton and Langley Marish in Buckinghamshire in the west. The parish vestries provided traditional poor relief and road maintenance but lay in the 19th century in different Poor Law Unions. Stanwell became part of Staines Rural District in 1894 and Staines Urban District in 1930. The Buckinghamshire parishes joined Eton Rural District in 1894.

In 1965 the eastern part of Colnbrook was transferred to Surrey with the rest of Staines Urban District. In 1974 Staines Urban District was absorbed into the new borough of Spelthorne. In 1974 most of the parish of Horton was transferred to the new borough of Windsor and Maidenhead in Berkshire, but the western part of Colnbrook remained in Buckinghamshire and was added to the parish of Iver, in the South Bucks district. Colnbrook was finally united on 1 April 1995, when the present combined parish of Colnbrook with Poyle was formed and added to the borough of Slough in Berkshire. That was the county's last boundary change before Berkshire County Council was abolished to be replaced by six unitary authorities. When the county council was abolished in April 1998 the borough became more important for local government; however a Berkshire Fire and Rescue service persists, as do ceremonial roles, judicial roles and sporting competitions.

== Geography ==
Colnbrook (with Poyle) is at the eastern end of the borough of Slough and is directly west of the M25 motorway which separates it from Heathrow Airport in the London Borough of Hillingdon in Greater London and the borough of Spelthorne in Surrey. Elevations vary between 22 and 20m Above Ordnance Datum with the Thames at 17m AOD 3 miles (4.8 km) south at Staines which is where the natural rivers generally drain toward. The river is unusual for its regional park (and walk) and seven mouths (distributaries).

== Economy ==
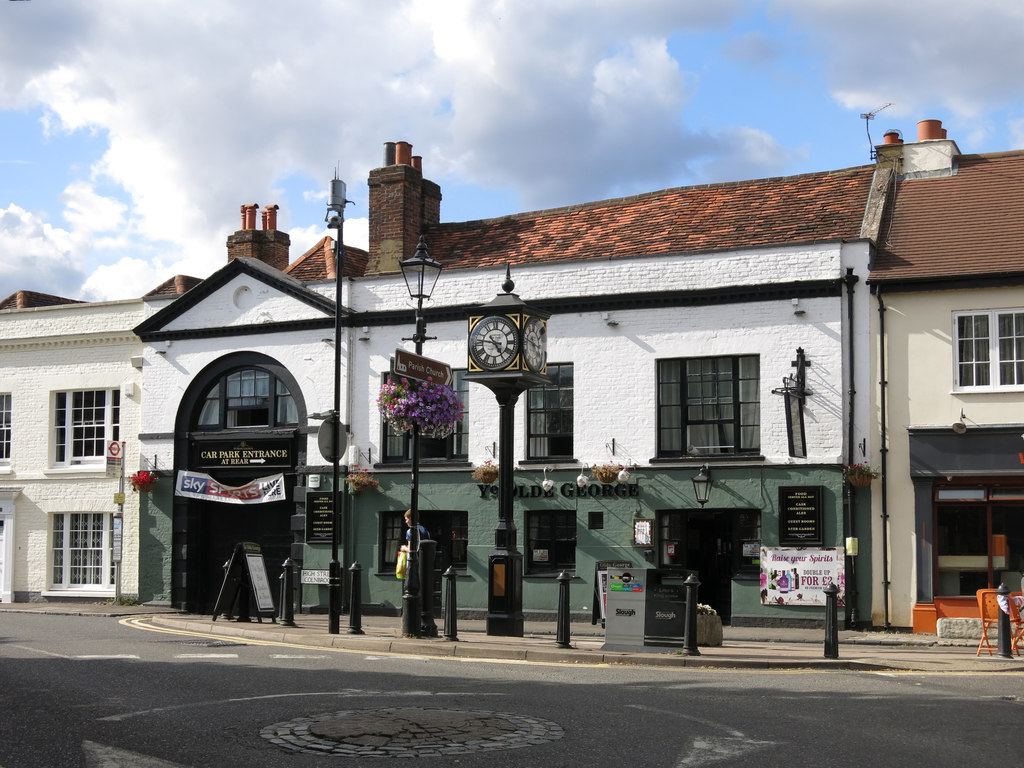
Ye Old George Inn behind the Jubilee Clock erected in 2012

The town's industrial estates are important in fields such as transportation, food and drinks manufacture, warehousing and distribution and despite almost all being in Poyle, landlords have mostly preferred to let premises under the name Colnbrook – but not all, such as Coca-Cola. Beside the Greater London boundary and a historic part of Stanwell which forms the southern part of London Heathrow Airport, it is also equidistant between nearby accessible junctions of the M4 and M25 and a suburban parish with significant industrial/logistical buildings and open land.

== Politics ==
Colnbrook is in the Windsor constituency and its Member of Parliament is Jack Rankin (Conservative).

== Demography ==
At the 2011 census, the whole civil parish had a population of 6,157 living in 2,533 homes, giving a density of 10.9 people per hectare (approximately a quarter of the density of the borough as a whole and just under one half of the average for England).

== Transport ==
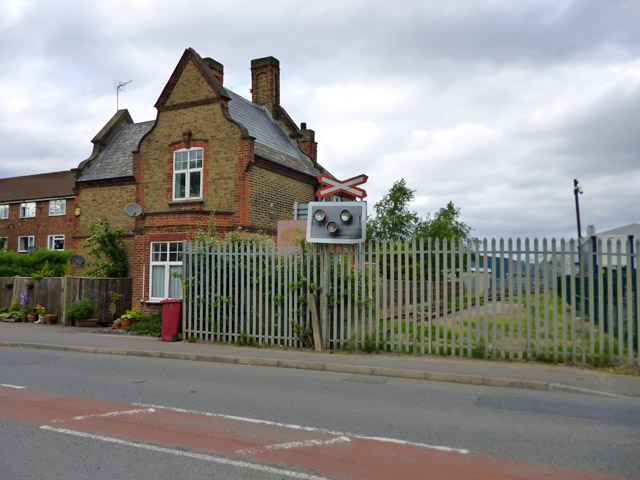
Former Colnbrook Station located in Poyle, closed in 1965

Colnbrook was before the M4 along the Roman-origin A4 (previously the Bath road) as well as to Windsor or Maidenhead by way of Slough, and had been a convenient halting-place for travellers before the introduction of railways.

Local bus services are operated by Metroline who run services on the 81 from the main village to Hounslow and First Berkshire & The Thames Valley who run the remainder of the services.

=== Abandoned railway ===
Colnbrook was served by a railway line that ran to West Drayton, with a railway station serving the village until it was closed in 1965 under the Beeching Axe. The railway line formerly continued to also to Staines-upon-Thames.
