= Colne Brook =

River in England

Coordinates: 51°26′19″N 0°32′06″W

The Colne Brook is a river in England that is a distributary of the River Colne which runs from Uxbridge Moor, there forming the western border of Greater London, to the River Thames just below Bell Weir Lock in Hythe End, Wraysbury, Berkshire. (Note: In the same way as Datchet, Eton and Slough, all parts of Berkshire mentioned were historically Buckinghamshire.)

== Course ==
On leaving the Colne at Uxbridge Moor in the Colne Valley regional park, the Colne Brook flows close by to its west until West Drayton then passes under the M25 motorway at the M4 "Thorney interchange", enters Berkshire and flows through the village of Colnbrook. South of there, it receives some water from the Poyle Channel, after which that becomes the Wraysbury River watering the west of Staines Moor. Then the Brook runs between Horton's centre and another residential part of Horton on Coppermill Road adjoining Wraysbury Reservoir. Colne Brook has its end stage in the easternmost parish of the Royal Borough of Windsor and Maidenhead. It passes Wraysbury railway station then adjoins gravel-extraction-made lakes of Wraysbury, a Site of Special Scientific Interest, before running into the River Thames: between the M25 Runnymede Bridge and Bell Weir Lock upstream.

Images of the river and on discharge at the River Thames
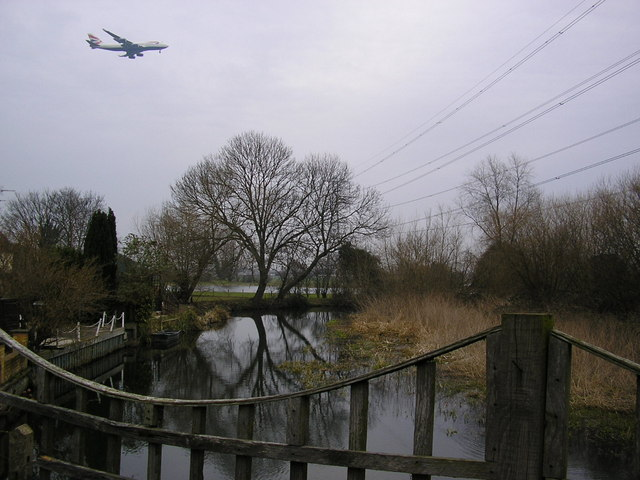
In the village of Colnbrook

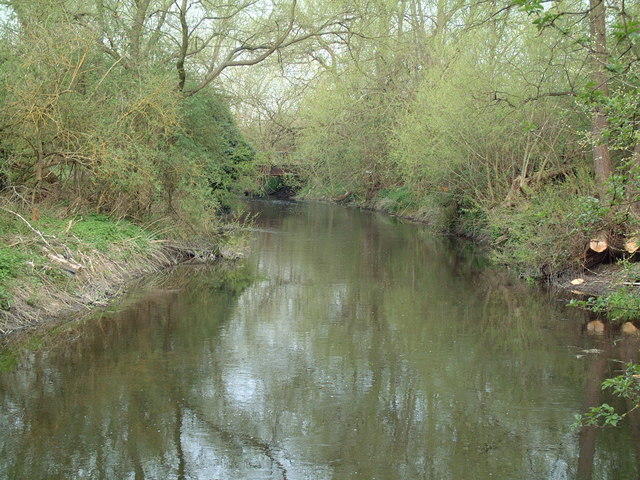
South of Colnbook

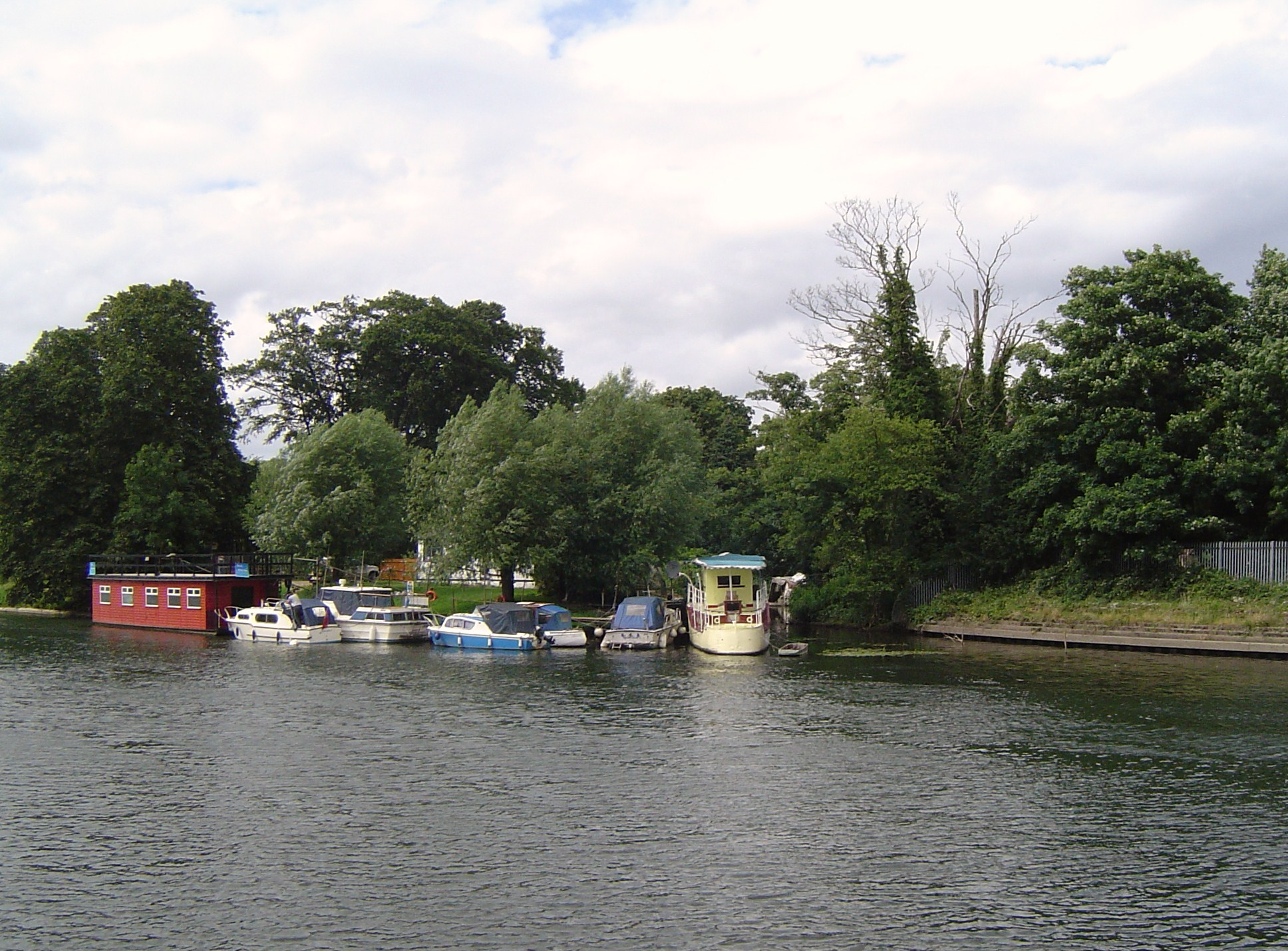
On discharge at the River Thames

== See also ==
- Tributaries of the River Thames
- List of rivers of England

== Notes and references ==
Notes

Next confluence upstream	River Thames	Next confluence downstream
Jubilee River (north)	Colne Brook	River Colne (north)
