= Colnbrook with Poyle =

Civil parish in Berkshire, England

Coordinates: 51.482°N 0.519°W

- Location within Berkshire
- Area: 2.175 sq mi (5.63 km^{2})
- Population: 6,157 (2011)
  - Density: 2,831/sq mi (1,093/km^{2})
- OS grid reference: TQ028769
  - London: 17 mi (27 km) E
- Civil parish: Colnbrook with Poyle
- Unitary authority: Slough
- Ceremonial county: Berkshire
- Region: South East
- Country: England
- Sovereign state: United Kingdom
- Post town: SLOUGH
- Postcode district: SL3
- Dialling code: 01753
- Police: Thames Valley
- Fire: Royal Berkshire
- Ambulance: South Central
- UK Parliament: Windsor
- Website: Colnbrook with Poyle Parish Council

Colnbrook with Poyle is a civil parish in the borough of Slough in Berkshire, England. Located approximately 17 miles (27 km) west of central London and adjacent to the Greater London boundary, it is an urbanised parish with some industrial development and open land. The local council is Colnbrook with Poyle Parish Council. The parish was created on 1 April 1995 as an amalgamation of Colnbrook from the parish of Iver with Poyle from an unparished area. At the 2001 census it had a population of 5,426.

== History ==
The parish was formed on 1 April 1995. Most of Colnbrook had been from 1974 in the parish of Iver in South Bucks district in Buckinghamshire, and before 1974 had been mostly in the parish of Horton, with small areas in Langley Marish. Poyle had been in the unparished borough of Spelthorne in Surrey (before 1974 forming part of the Staines Urban District of Surrey which had transferred from Middlesex in 1965). The new parish became part of Berkshire, and was the last boundary change before Berkshire County Council was abolished in 1998 and replaced by several unitary authorities.

== Geography ==
The boundaries of the parish of Colnbrook with Poyle

It is at the eastern end of the borough of Slough, and is just to the west of the M25 motorway, which separates the parish from Heathrow Airport in the London Borough of Hillingdon in Greater London.
