= Staines and West Drayton Railway =

Freight-only railway line in southern England

Coordinates: 51°29′9″N 0°30′13″W

Staines–West Drayton line
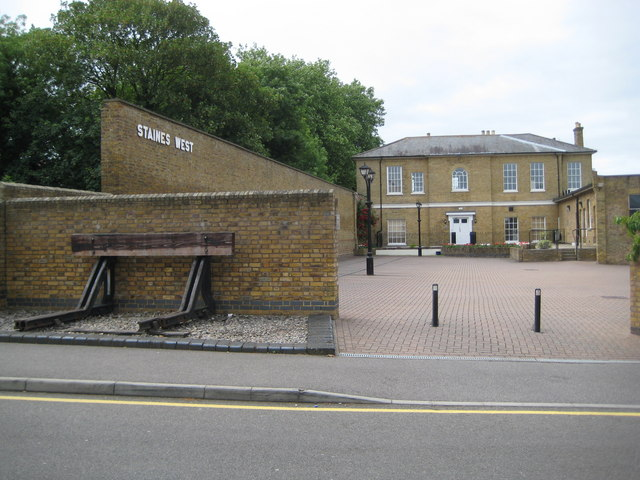
- The former southern terminus, Staines West

Overview
- Status: Part operational
- Owner: Network Rail
- Locale: Greater London, Berkshire, Surrey
- Termini: West Drayton; Staines West

Service
- Type: Freight

History
- Opened: 1884-1885

Technical
- Line length: 2 mi 74 ch (4.7 km) (operational); 6 mi (9.7 km) total
- Number of tracks: 1
- Track gauge: 1,435 mm (4 ft 8 1/2 in) standard gauge
- Electrification: none
- Operating speed: 20 mph (32 km/h) (maximum)

The Staines and West Drayton Railway (S&WDR), also called the Staines–West Drayton line and the Colnbrook branch, is a partially open, freight-only railway line in southern England. Formerly it ran for around 6 miles (9.7 km) from the Great Western Main Line at West Drayton to Staines in Surrey, passing through the village of Colnbrook in Berkshire. The operational part of the line, north of Colnbrook, runs for 2 mi 74 ch (4.7 km) and is used exclusively by freight trains.

The earliest plans for a railway linking Staines to the Great Western Main Line were put forward in the 1840s, but were not approved by parliament at the time. The Colnbrook Railway Act 1866 was passed, but the powers expired before the necessary capital could be raised. Further bills were required to authorise the S&WDR before construction eventually began in 1882. The line from West Drayton to Colnbrook opened on 9 August 1884 and passenger services began running to Staines on 2 November 1885.

Following the Beeching Report of 1963, all passenger services were withdrawn on 27 March 1965. The full length of the line remained open for freight trains, until the southern half was closed in 1981 to allow the construction of the M25 motorway.

== Route ==
The Staines–West Drayton line linked the Great Western Main Line (GWML) at West Drayton in Middlesex to Staines in Surrey. On opening, the line ran for around 6 mi (9.7 km), but only the northernmost 2 mi 74 ch (4.7 km) is still operational. The line was never electrified and has always been single track. The route is broadly parallelled by the southernmost part of the River Colne.

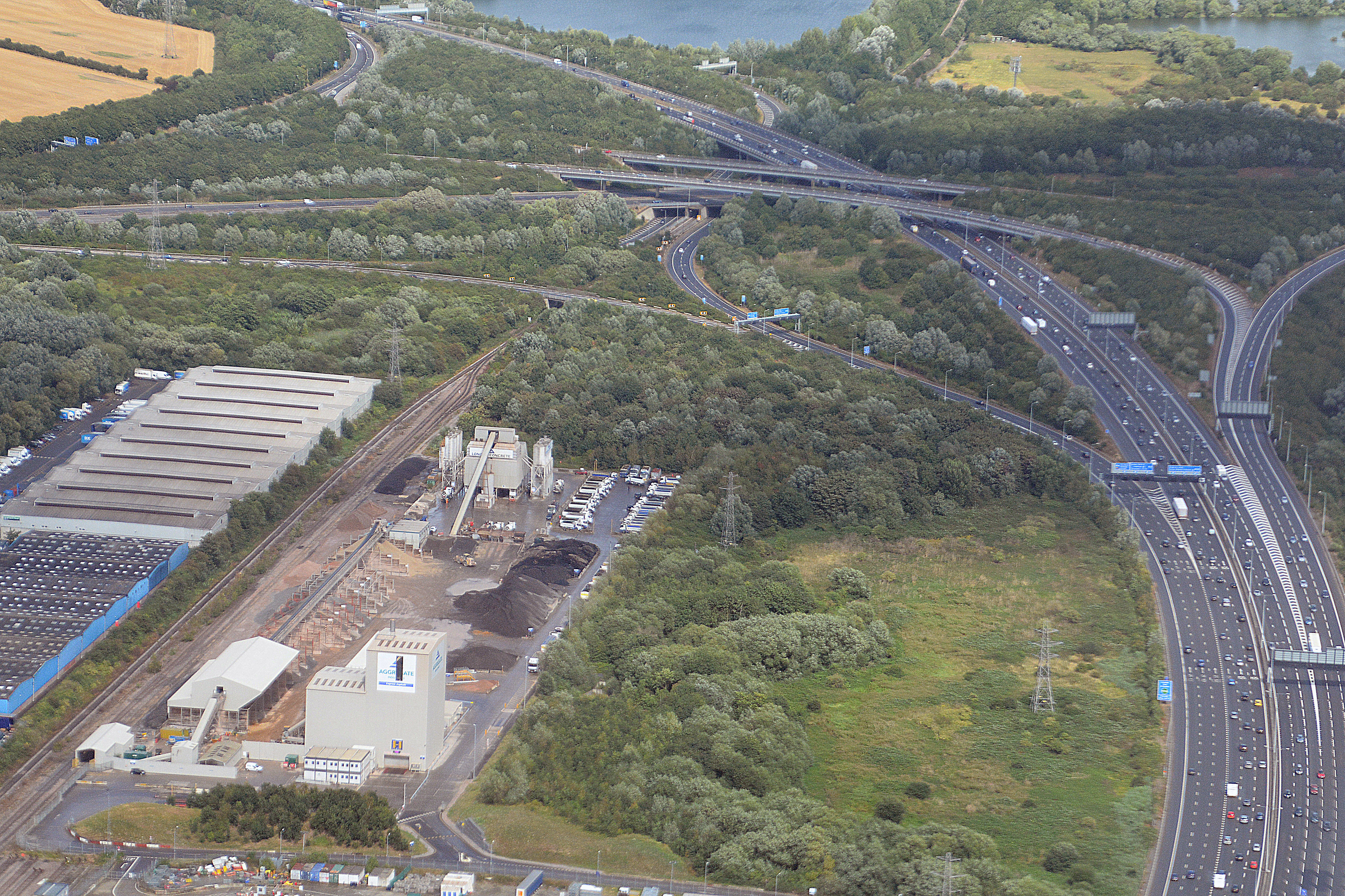
The freight-only, operational part of the line runs beneath the Thorney Interchange (top centre) and beside the Aggregate Industries depot (lower left).

The operational part of the line runs for 2 mi 74 ch (4.7 km) from West Drayton Junction to Colnbrook Oil Terminal. It branches from the northern side of the GWML, 13 mi 31 ch (21.5 km) west of London Paddington, and immediately turns southwards, descending on a 1 in 104 gradient to pass beneath the main line. It passes beneath the Thorney Interchange, the junction between the M4 and M25 motorways. The single-track line has a maximum speed limit of 20 mph (32 km/h) and train movements are controlled from Thames Valley Signalling Centre. At the southern end of the operational part of the line, the site of Colnbrook station is occupied by the oil terminal.

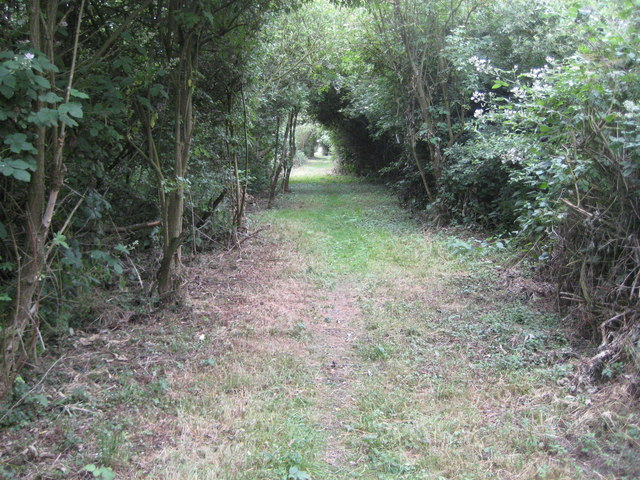
The former track bed and site of Yeoveney Halt on Staines Moor

South of Colnbrook, the line is closed, the track has been lifted and part of the trackbed is occupied by the M25. The line ran across Staines Moor before climbing at 1 in 133 to pass over the Wraysbury River and the Staines–Windsor line. The station building for the southern terminus, Staines West, still stands to the northwest of Staines-upon-Thames town centre and is a Grade II-listed building.

== History ==
Colnbrook Railway Act 1866
- Act of Parliament
- Parliament of the United Kingdom
- Long title: An Act for making Railways from the Great Western Railway at or near West Drayton in the County of Middlesex to Colnbrook, and to the Windsor Branch of the London and South-western Railway at Staines, in the County of Middlesex; and for other Purposes.
- Citation: 29 & 30 Vict. c. cccxliii

Dates
- Royal assent: 6 August 1866

The earliest proposals for a railway line through Colnbrook were advanced in the mid-1840s, but were not granted parliamentary approval. By the 1860s, Staines was an industrial town, with mills, factories and a brewery. In 1863, the West Drayton and Staines Railway proposed to link the area to the GWML, reducing the reliance on lines operated by the London and South Western Railway (LSWR). The 1863 scheme failed, but two years later, two further proposals were submitted to Parliament resulting in the Colnbrook Railway Act 1866 (29 & 30 Vict. c. cccxliii), which authorised a single-track line from the south side of the GWML at West Drayton to the LSWR Staines–Windsor line. The Great Western Railway (GWR) agreed to operate passenger services, but the powers to construct the line expired before sufficient capital could be raised.

Staines and West Drayton Railway Act 1873
- Act of Parliament
- Parliament of the United Kingdom
- Long title: An Act for making a Railway from the London and South-western Railway at Staines to the Great Western Railway at West Drayton; and for other purposes.
- Citation: 36 & 37 Vict. c. cxxviii

Dates
- Royal assent: 7 July 1873

Text of statute as originally enacted

Staines and West Drayton Railway Act 1878
- Act of Parliament
- Parliament of the United Kingdom
- Long title: An Act to revive the powers and extend the periods for the compulsory purchase of Lands and for the Construction of the Railway authorised by the Staines and West Drayton Railway Act, 1873.
- Citation: 41 & 42 Vict. c. xcix

Dates
- Royal assent: 17 June 1878

Text of statute as originally enacted

Despite opposition from the LSWR, a new act, the Staines and West Drayton Railway Act 1873 (36 & 37 Vict. c. cxxviii), authorising the Staines and West Drayton Railway Company (S&WDR), was passed on 7 July 1873. The line, which was to follow the route approved in the 1866 act, required the use of the existing LSWR Staines station. The GWR agreed to operate the line, but refused to share its rival's station. In 1882, the S&WDR submitted a second bill in November 1882, to allow it to develop its own station in Staines and to build a link to the linoleum factory in the town.

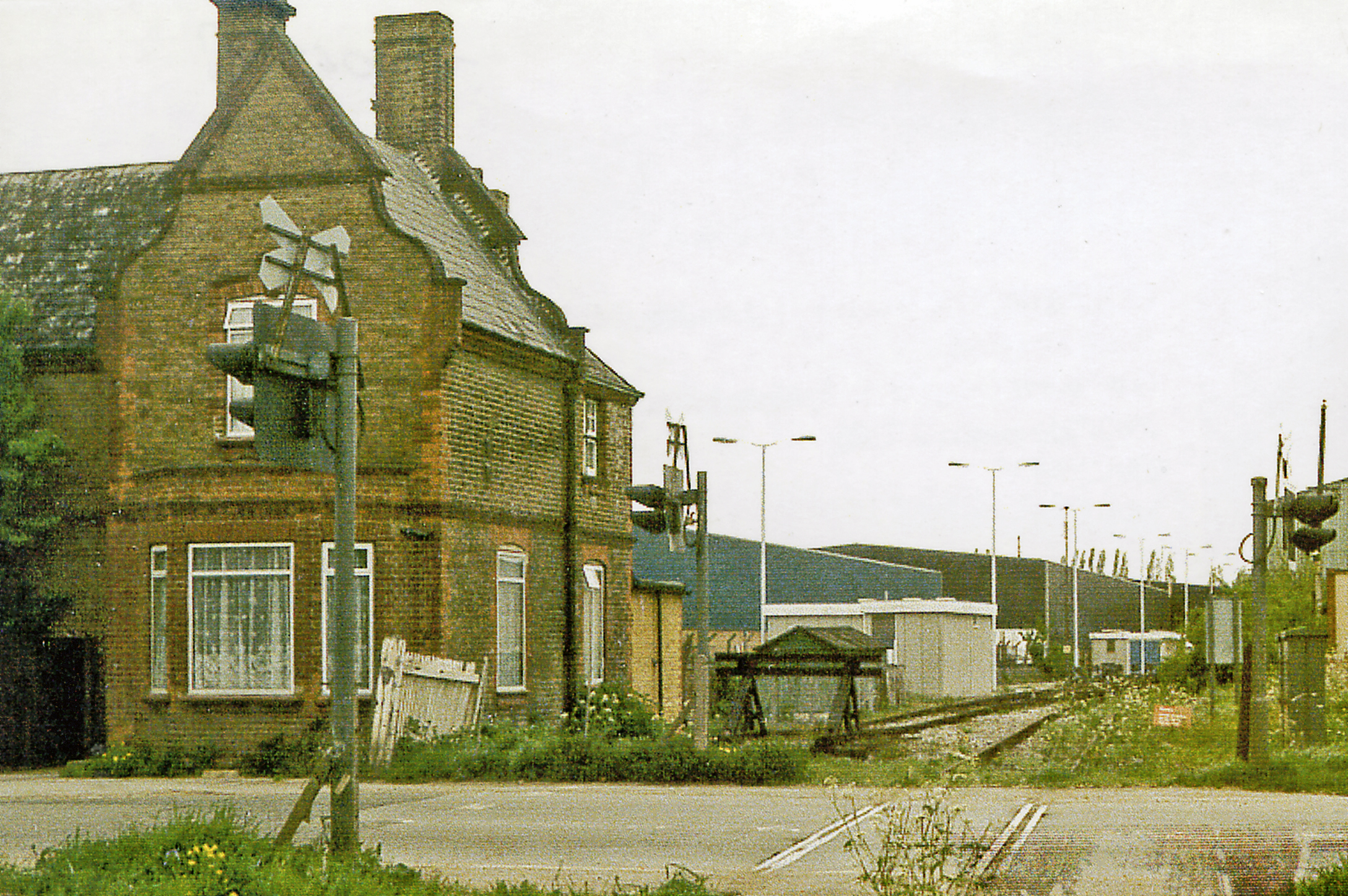
The former Colnbrook station in 1986, 21 years after closure

Construction of the line began in 1882, but financial pressures forced the S&WDR to save costs where possible. An existing private house was adapted for Staines West station, which was provided with a single platform. The temporary terminus, and only intermediate station at Colnbrook, was also provided with a single platform and a passing loop was not installed there until 2 May 1904. The line from West Drayton to Colnbrook opened on 9 August 1884 and passenger services began running to Staines on 2 November 1885.

The Metropolitan Rifle Range Company was formed 1890, to provide a firing range closer to the capital than the ranges at Bisley. On 1 March 1892, the GWR opened a halt to serve the range. Initially named Runemede Range, it became Runemede on 9 July 1934, then Yeoveney on 4 November 1935. The halt closed on 14 May 1962.

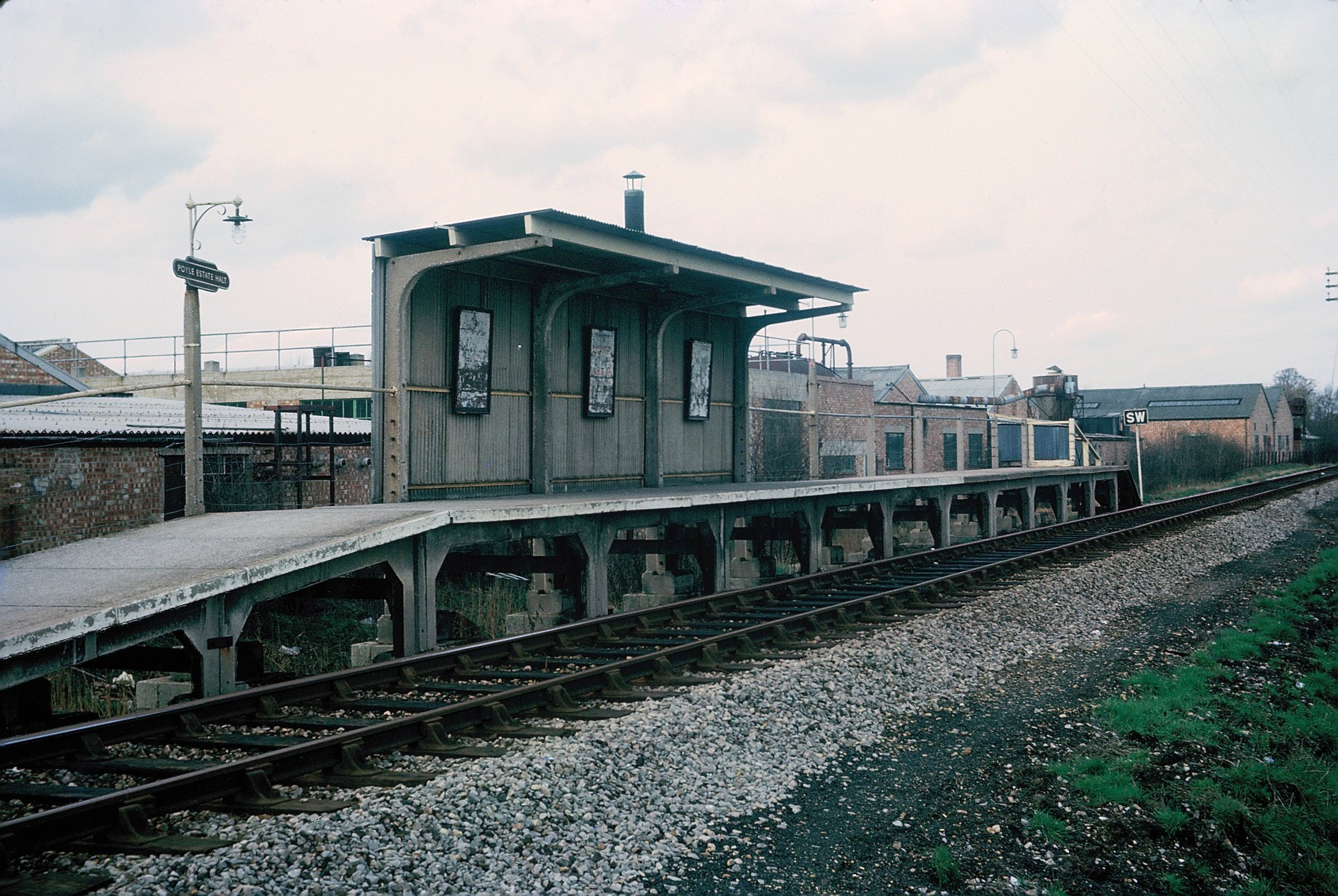
Poyle Estate Halt

Poyle Halt opened as Stanwell Moor and Poyle Halt on 1 June 1927, but became Poyle for Stanwell Moor on 26 September that year. The waiting shelter was destroyed by fire on 5 October 1964. Poyle Estate Halt opened 4 January 1954 to serve new factories between Colnbrook and Poyle.

The first Beeching report, published in 1963, recommended the withdrawal of all passenger trains over the line. Passenger services ceased in March 1965, but the line remained open for freight trains. A farewell special excursion train ran along the full length of the line on 30 July 1978.

In the early 1980s, the southern part of the line was severed by the construction of the M25 motorway. Junction 14 was built on the site of Poyle Halt and part of the trackbed to the south was covered by the new road. The final train to reach Staines, a freight working to the oil terminal, ran on 16 January 1981. The line north of Colnbrook was retained to serve the factories and depots in the area.

== Current and former freight operations ==
Although goods yards were provided at both Colnbrook and Staines West from opening, freight traffic on the line was slow to develop. In May 1877, a link was built across the River Colne to allow GWR trains to access the goods yard for the Staines Linoleum Works, a facility shared with the LSWR. The linoleum factory closed in 1973, but regular freight workings to Staines West had ceased in October 1953.

On 24 June 1964, Shell-Mex and BP opened a rail terminal for heating oil on the site of the former Staines West goods yard. The depot, served by a single siding capable of holding up to 12 tank wagons, was served by 2-6 trains per week, depending on the season. Initially steam engines were used to haul oil trains, but were replaced by diesel locomotives after the first few months. The construction of the M25 across the trackbed at Poyle, meant that terminal could no longer be served by trains running via Colnbrook. A link from the Staines–Windsor line opened in January 1981, thereby allowing continued rail access into the depot. Staines oil depot closed on 24 June 1991.

In 1974, the sidings at Thorney Mill were served by 24 oil trains and ten stone trains per week. The facility also handled 360 tons of scrap metal. The railhead closed in 2013, but was reopened as a depot for Ashville Aggregates in 2019. In January 2022, GB Railfreight began hauling aggregates trains to Thorney Mill from Newhaven and a five-year expansion plan to increase the site capacity to 26 freight wagons was announced in August 2024.

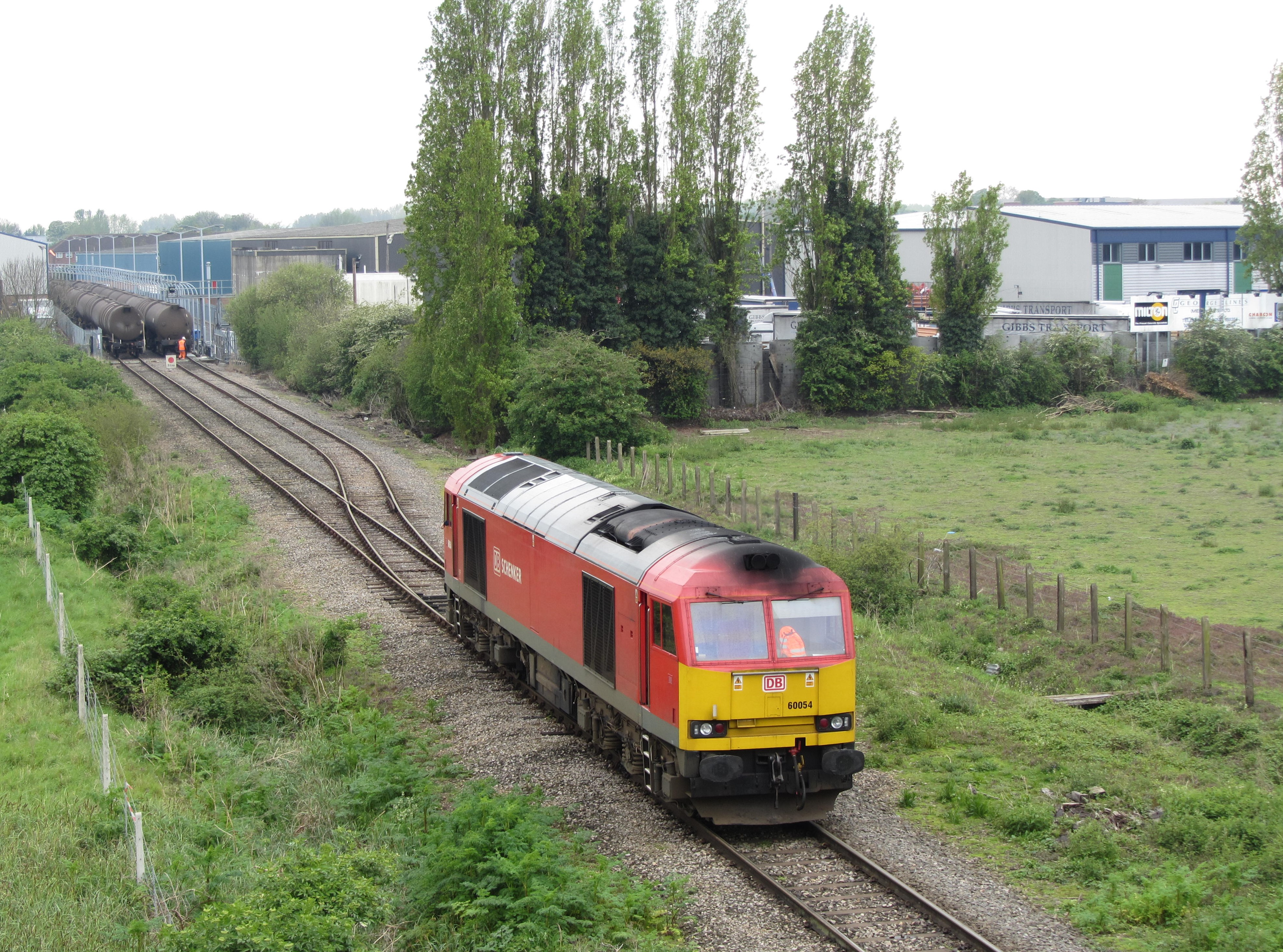
A Class 60 locomotive at Colnbrook Oil Terminal in 2012

In May 1990, a new aviation fuel terminal for Heathrow Airport was opened on the former station site at Colnbrook. Fuel is transferred from trains to the airport via a 1.9 km-long (1.2 mi) 12 in (300 mm) diameter pipeline. Between 2015 and 2018, the fuel trains were operated by Colas Rail and ran to Colnbrook from Lindsey Oil Refinery. In late 2019, 320 wagon loads (each wagon capable of holding 75 t (83 tons) of aviation fuel) were being transported to the site each week, accounting for around 20% of the airport's fuel requirement. Loaded trains were hauled from the Isle of Grain oil terminal by dedicated Class 66/6 locomotives, operated by Freightliner. Aviation fuel trains to Colnbrook ceased during the COVID-19 pandemic, but services were restored with a new operator, GB Railfreight, in 2022.

In the mid-2000s, cement and fly ash were delivered to sidings in Colnbrook for the construction of Heathrow Terminal 5.

== Former passenger services and rolling stock ==
The Staines and West Drayton Railway opened on 2 November 1885, with nine trains each way between West Drayton and Staines West on weekdays. Sunday services began in 1887, with four return trips. By 1900, the weekday timetable included eight return workings, which increased to 14 return workings in 1912.

GWR autocoaches were introduced to the line on 1 October 1914 and had taken over the vast majority of passenger services by the start of 1916. In the 1920s and 1930s, rush hour passenger services were hauled by 2-6-2T tank engines. In the mid-1950s, there were 18 return trains on weekdays, with 12 on Sundays. Most trains were two carriages hauled by GWR 0-6-0PT and 2-6-2T locomotives. GWR railcars were first used in January 1954 and took over all passenger services in October 1958.

The line was listed for closure in the 1963 Beeching Report and the enhanced peak-hour timetable was reduced in October 1964. Passenger services ceased in March 1965 and a bus service was provided as a substitute.

== Proposals ==
The proposed Airtrack-Lite rail link from Heathrow Airport through Staines-upon-Thames would entail laying track near the former southern part of the S&WDR route.

== Bibliography ==
- Beeching, Richard (27 March 1963a). The Reshaping of British Railways Part 1: Report. London: HMSO.
- Beeching, Richard (27 March 1963b). The Reshaping of British Railways Part 2: Maps. London: HMSO.
- Jackson, Alan A. (1978). London's Local Railways. Newton Abbot: David & Charles. ISBN 978-0-71-537479-5.
- Jackson, Alan A. (1999) [1978]. London's local railways (2nd ed.). Harrow Weald: Capital Transport. ISBN 978-0-71-537479-5.
- Mills, John (1993). A guide to the industrial history of Spelthorne. Guildford: Surrey Industrial History Group. ISBN 978-0-95-096976-3.
- Mitchell, Vic; Smith, Keith (1988). Waterloo to Windsor via Richmond. Midhurst: Middleton Press. ISBN 978-0-90-652054-3.
- Mitchell, Vic; Smith, Keith (2000). Branch lines of West London. Midhurst: Middleton Press. ISBN 978-1-90-170650-5.
- Shannon, Paul D. (2022). Rail Freight in the 21st Century. Stroud: Amberley Publishing. ISBN 978-1-39-811185-1.
- "Western Route Sectional Appendix" (PDF). Network Rail. 2024.
