= Poyle =

Area of Slough, Berkshire, England

Coordinates: 51.4779°N 0.5087°W

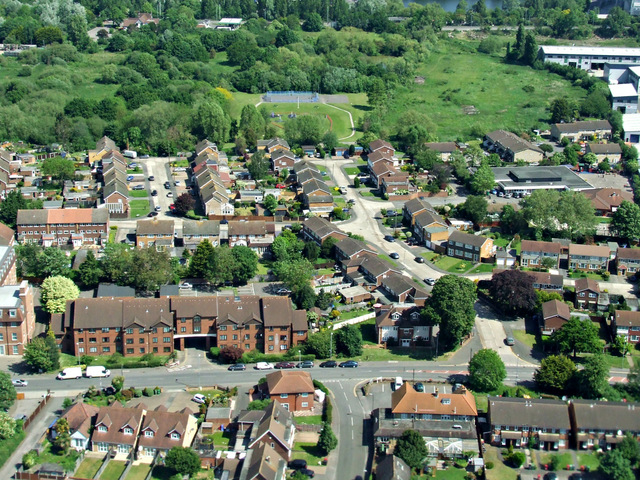
- Poyle from the air, 2014

- Location within Berkshire
- OS grid reference: TQ035765
- Civil parish: Colnbrook with Poyle
- Unitary authority: Slough
- Ceremonial county: Berkshire
- Region: South East
- Country: England
- Sovereign state: United Kingdom
- Post town: SLOUGH
- Postcode district: SL3
- Dialling code: 01753
- Police: Thames Valley
- Fire: Royal Berkshire
- Ambulance: South Central
- UK Parliament: Windsor

Poyle is a largely industrial and agricultural area in the unitary authority of Slough, in the ceremonial county of Berkshire, England (of which it is the easternmost settlement). It is located 18.5 miles (30 km) west of Charing Cross in London and immediately west of the M25 motorway, near Heathrow Airport; it also adjoins the Colne Valley regional park.

Historically in Middlesex, Poyle was transferred to Surrey in 1965 and to Berkshire in 1995. Together with the neighbouring village of Colnbrook to the west, it forms the Colnbrook with Poyle civil parish.

== History ==
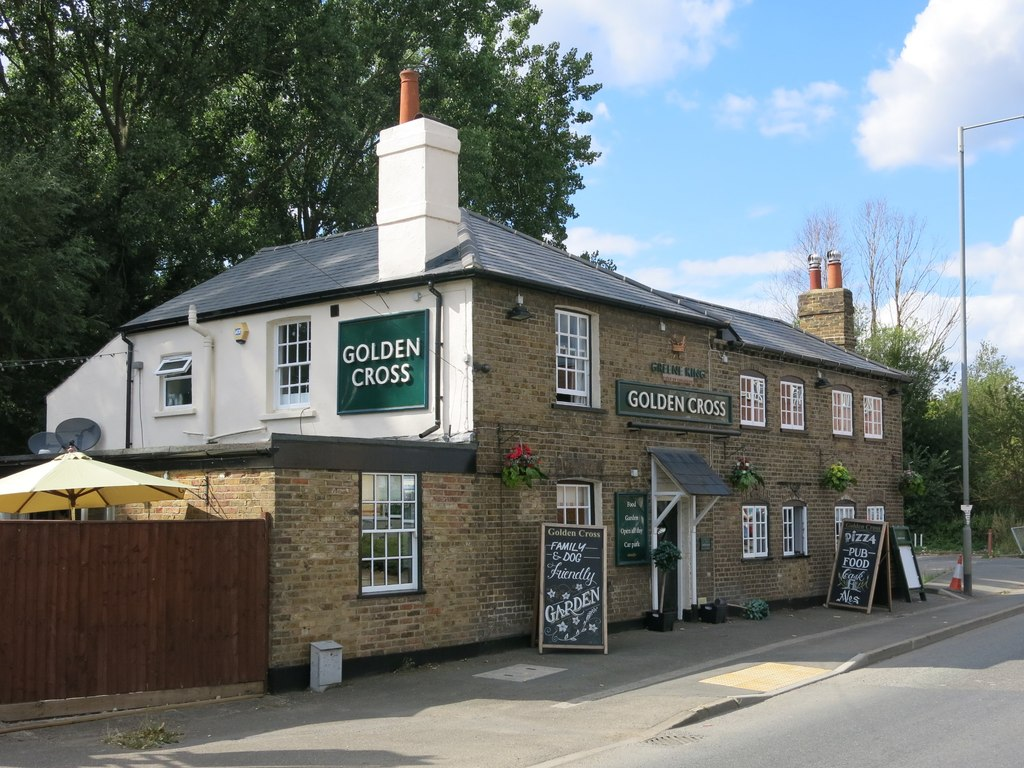
The Golden Cross pub, Poyle Road

Poyle lay within Middlesex since before the Norman Conquest as part of Stanwell, developing a manor in the early Middle Ages. In 1894 it became part of Staines Urban District, which transferred to Surrey in 1965 following the dissolution of Middlesex. In 1974, Staines Urban District was absorbed into the new borough of Spelthorne under the Local Government Act 1972; the construction of the M25 in the 1980s separated Poyle from the other settlements in the borough. In 1995, it and the neighbouring village of Colnbrook (in Buckinghamshire) were transferred to Berkshire, forming the new Colnbrook with Poyle parish within the borough of Slough.

Poyle is now contiguous with Colnbrook.

== Transport ==
London Buses route 81, operated by London United, serves Poyle; other bus services are provided by First Berkshire & The Thames Valley.

The Staines & West Drayton Railway was built through Poyle in the 1880s, and at one stage two stations served the area: Poyle for Stanwell Moor Halt, which opened in 1927, and Poyle Estate Halt, which opened in 1954. Both were closed in 1965 when passenger services on the railway were withdrawn, and the track was lifted in 1981 due to the construction of the M25.

== Heathrow Airport ==
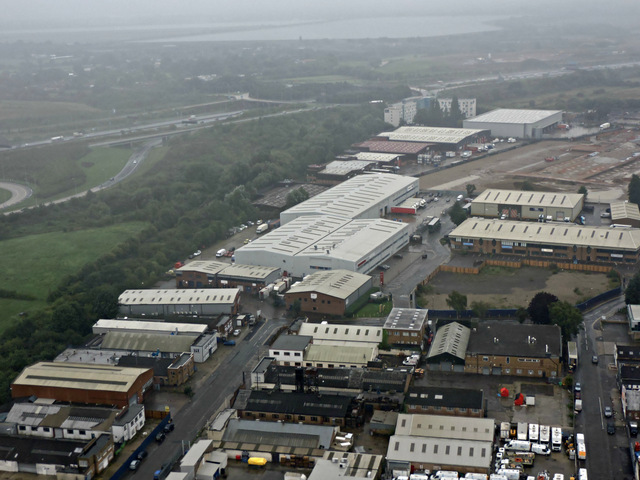
Poyle Industrial Estate from the air

Poyle is the location of a major Federal Express (FedEx) sorting office where parcels and letters are processed before being air dispatched to overseas destinations via nearby Heathrow airport. Due to its proximity to Heathrow airport Poyle lies under the flight path of many departing/arriving routes. Poyle Residents Association have long campaigned for restrictions on night flights from Heathrow airport. Along with other local village/town residents' groups they have been involved in second stage consultation talks (during 2005) with the DTI about this problem. Poyle is also the British location for the Aerospace Fire Protection Company, named Graviner (which was part of Wilkinson Sword) and is now Kidde-Graviner part of the United Technologies Corporation Group. Poyle is now home to the Hilton London Heathrow Airport Terminal 5 which was opened on 31 August 2011 and the Travelodge UK Heathrow Terminal 5.

== Adjoining land ==
- Colnbrook (long north, imperceptible border)
- Heathrow Airport
- Horton
- Langley, Slough
- Longford
- Stanwell Moor
