= Staines West railway station =

Former railway station in Surrey, England

Coordinates: 51.4362°N 0.5153°W

Staines West
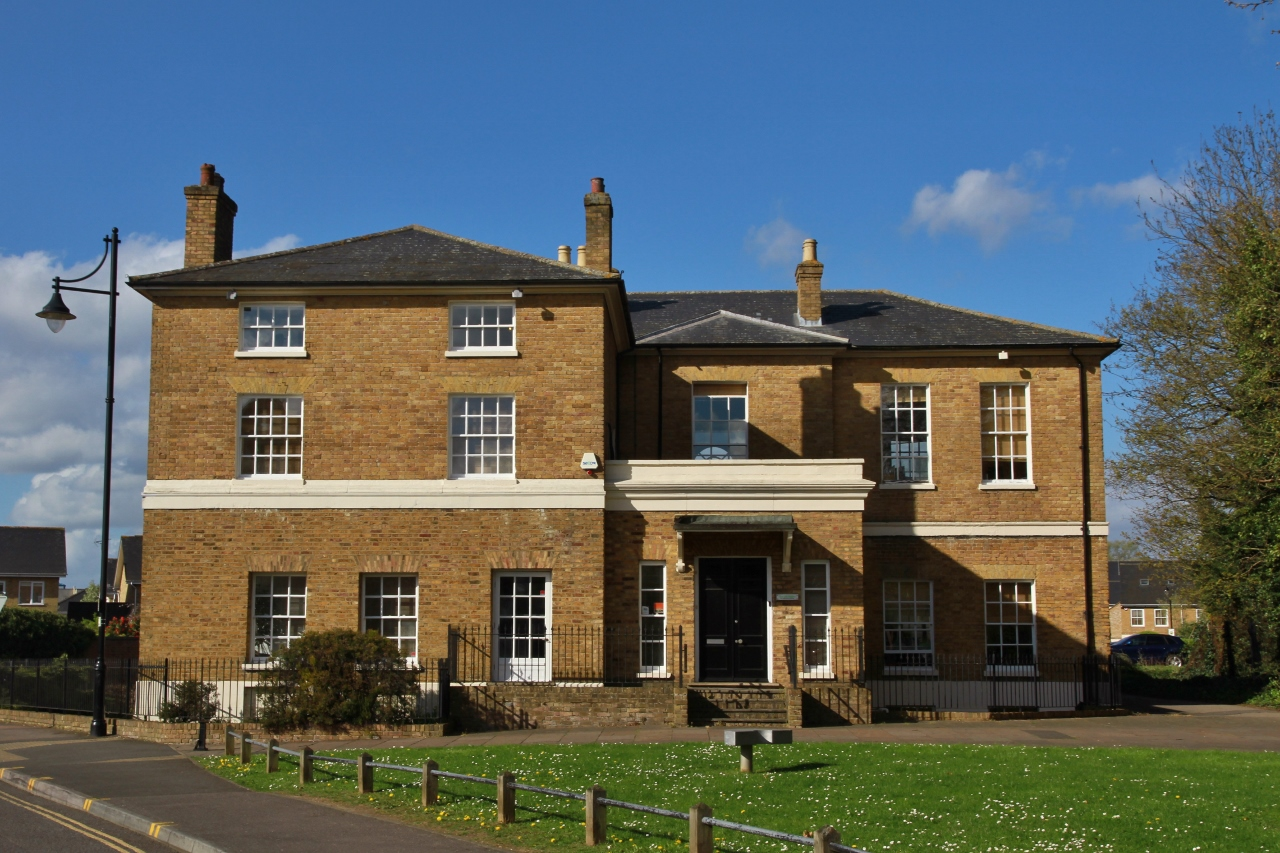
- Main building seen from the south in 2017

General information
- Location: Staines-upon-Thames, Spelthorne; England
- Grid reference: TQ033718
- Platforms: 1

Other information
- Status: Disused

History
- Original company: Staines & West Drayton Railway
- Pre-grouping: Great Western Railway
- Post-grouping: Great Western Railway

Key dates
- 2 November 1885: Opened as "Staines"
- 26 September 1949: Renamed "Staines West"
- 29 March 1965: Closed
Location

Staines West railway station was one of three stations in the town of Staines-upon-Thames, Surrey, England. The station was opened on 2 November 1885 as the southern terminus of the Staines & West Drayton Railway (SWDR).

== History ==
The station was originally named "Staines", although the London and South Western Railway (LSWR) already had a Staines railway station on the opposite side of the town centre. The LSWR had refused access to its station because the SWDR was operated by the rival Great Western Railway (GWR). The two companies competed to Windsor and Reading, Berkshire and the LSWR regarded the SWDR as encroaching on its territory in Staines. The third station, Staines High Street station, closed in 1916 after only 32 years in operation.

The station was in Wraysbury Road at the junction with Moor Lane. The building was a 19th-century villa of London stock brick that had been built for the owner of the adjacent Pound Mill on the River Colne. The SWDR bought the house from the miller and had it converted it into the station building. Tracks and a goods yard were laid north of the house and a single platform with a short canopy was built.

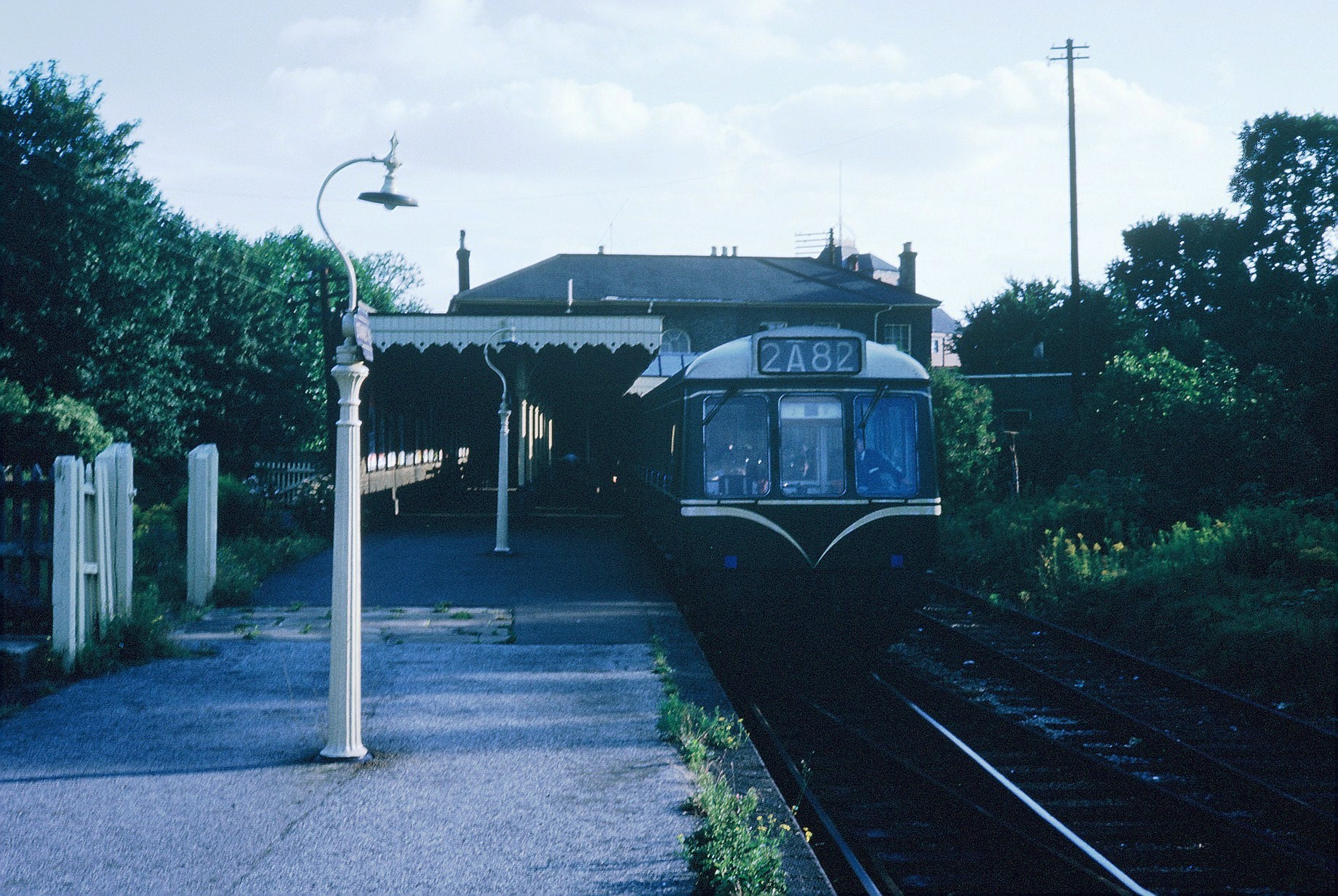
The station in August 1962 with a British Rail Class 121 at the platform

On 26 September 1949 British Railways renamed the station "Staines West". In 1964 it had 14 trains on weekdays. On 29 March 1965 BR withdrew passenger services on the branch and closed the station.

After closure to passengers the goods yard was demolished and a rail-accessed oil storage depot built in its place in 1964. In 1981 then the line north of the station was severed by the building of the M25 motorway so a new link to the Windsor line was laid to serve the oil depot. It closed ten years later.

The station building survives and has been converted into commercial offices. The platforms have been replaced with a car park and the tracks have been removed to make way for a small building.

The Heathrow Airtrack scheme for a rail link between Heathrow Airport and the South West Trains network would have appropriated part of the Staines West route.

Preceding station	Disused railways	Following station
Terminus	Staines & West Drayton Railway; Staines West branch	Yeoveney Halt
