= Brooklands College =

- Weybridge, Surrey, England; United Kingdom

Information
- Motto: Outstanding Every Day
- Established: 1951
- Principal: Christine Ricketts
- Staff: Over 500
- Enrollment: 5,000+
- Website: brooklands.ac.uk

Brooklands College is a further education college in Weybridge and Ashford, England.

In August 2007 Brooklands merged with Spelthorne College in Ashford. In 2016 the Ashford Campus moved to a new building and the former Spelthorne College site was demolished. The Weybridge campus is in the grounds of Hugh F. Locke King's historic mansion at Brooklands; the Ashford campus is adjacent to Thomas Knyvett College, Ashford.

The college provides courses for those leaving school after GCSEs, vocational subjects, A-levels, apprenticeships, and professional courses for adults including foundation degrees.

There are approximately 5,000 students attending the college; of these about 2,500 are full-time.

== Alumni ==
- Tom Chilton, racing driver.
- Martin Freeman, actor.
- Gary Numan, musician.
- Lucie Silvas, singer-songwriter.
- Wendy Smith-Sly, athlete who competed mainly in the 3,000 metres; silver medallist at the 1984 Olympics in Los Angeles; 1983 World Champion in the World 10 km road race championship.
- Norman Willis, General Secretary of the TUC, 1984–1993.
- James Purefoy, actor.

== In popular culture ==
- The 2007 film, I Want Candy, starring Carmen Electra, was filmed at Brooklands College.
- Four members of the pop punk band You Me at Six attended Brooklands College.
- A 2018 Waitrose Christmas advert was filmed at Brooklands College.

== See also ==
- List of UCAS institutions
- List of universities in the United Kingdom
