= James Lincoln =

James Lincoln may refer to:

- James Lincoln (athlete) (1889–1952), American track and field athlete
- James Lincoln (cricketer) (born 1981), English cricketer
- James H. Lincoln (1916–2011), Detroit City councilman, judge, and author
- James Sullivan Lincoln (1811–1888), American portrait painter
- Paul Lincoln (James McDonald Lincoln, 1921–2011), Australian professional wrestler
