= History of Staines-upon-Thames =

History of Staines-upon-Thames in Surrey, England, and historically in the county of Middlesex.

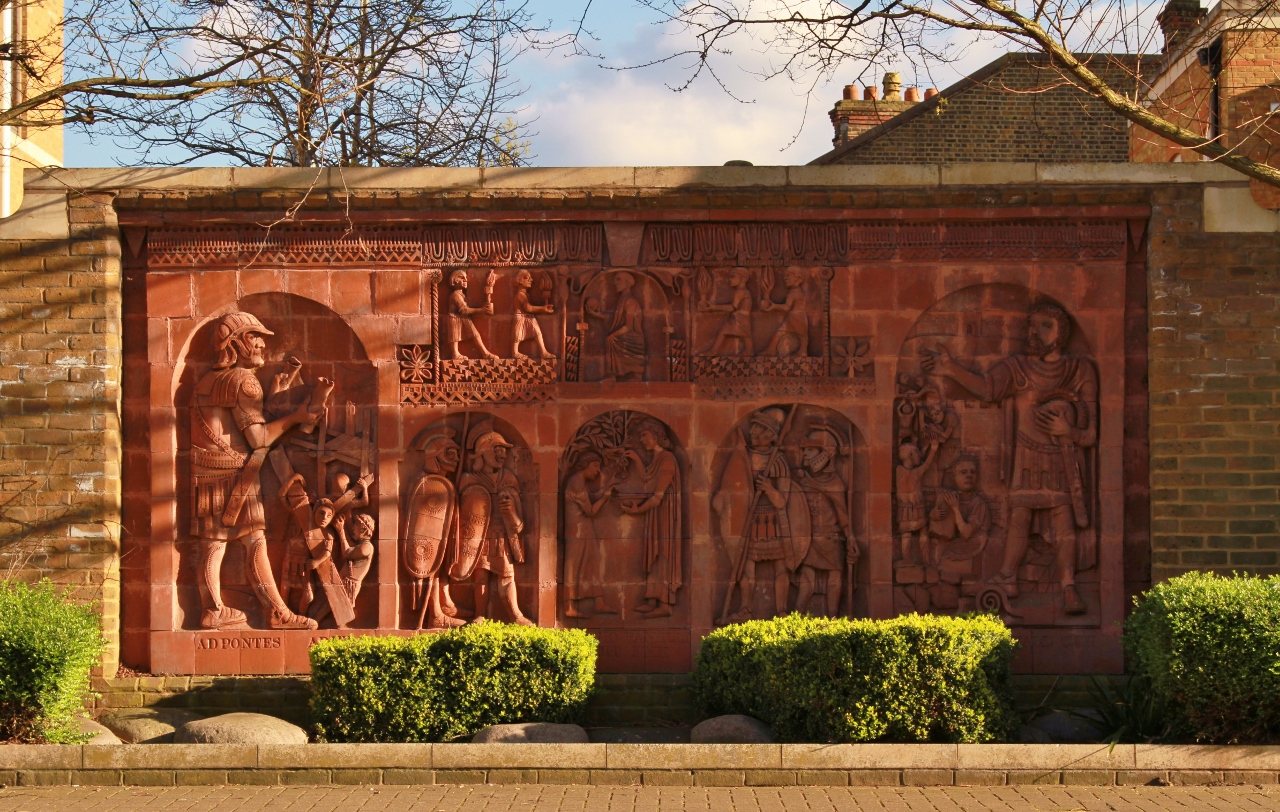
Modern terracotta relief in London Road, Staines, representing the town's Roman history

- 3000 BC — Neolithic settlement at Yeoveney Manor Farm by Staines Moor
- 43 — First Staines Bridge built by the Roman Empire
- 1009 — Sweyn Forkbeard's Danish army, which had been harrying (plundering) the Upper Thames valley, is said to have crossed the river at Staines to avoid an English force assembling in London. Middlesex marks the southern reach of the Danelaw.
- 1086 — Domesday Book is the first economic survey of England: Staines appears on its Middlesex map and listing as Stanes, held by Westminster Abbey, having 24 hides of arable land, 6 mills assessed at £3 4s 0d, 2 weirs remitting 6s 8d, meadow of 24 ploughlands, and unspecified cattle, it rendered £35 to its overlords. Foremost among these was the Abbey mentioned, as at the Norman Conquest.
- 1215 — Barons and Earls forced King John to seal Magna Carta at Runnymede, between Windsor and Staines, some of the signatories stayed at Staines before signing.
- 1218 — Staines market, held regularly (with an 1862-1872 interruption) to the present day is documented: the King orders the Sheriff of Middlesex (at request of the Church) to ensure it is moved to Fridays.
- 1222 — Staines Bridge was first mentioned after that of Roman times, when the king gave a tree from Windsor Forest for its repair.
- 1218 — Staines fair is allowed (franchised) by Westminster Abbey; first at Ascentiontide, then from 1241 on 7–10 September; by 1675 it has been cut to 8 September and in 1772 a second date is added back again, soon becoming 11 May and 19 September.
- 1285 — Landmark, the London Stone, installed to mark western limit of the City of London's jurisdiction over the River Thames. It originally stood upstream from Staines town centre and a replica marks the spot while the original undergoes restoration
- 1603 — Writer, poet, soldier, politician, courtier, spy and explorer Sir Walter Raleigh committed by Staines Magistrates for trial for treason (involvement in the Main Plot); tried and imprisoned until 1616.

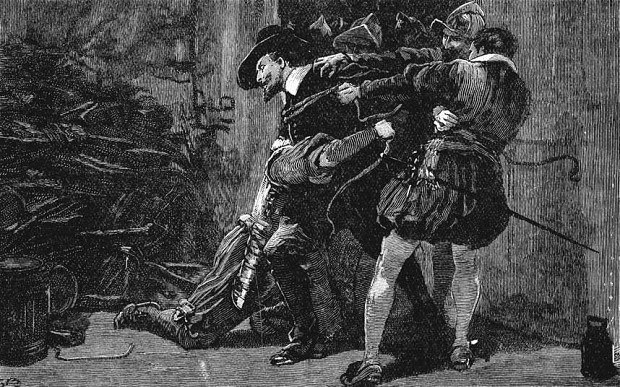
The first secular (and non-royal) owner, of the land representing most of the parish since the Norman Conquest, was Thomas Knyvet, 1st Baron Knyvet. He arrested Guy Fawkes in the cellar of the Houses of Parliament when Fawkes was planting explosives to kill King James VI and I and was convicted of high treason while rough justice was dispensed on others alleged to have conspired. Knyvet's actions and those of the Catholic peer who was forewarned, and Edward Doubleday in preventing this intended murder are celebrated annually on Bonfire Night. He was often seated in his earlier acquisition at Stanwell Manor, Stanwell and rented Knyvett House on the site of what later became 10 Downing Street, Westminster.

- 1613 — Following seizure by Henry VIII and a temporary grant to Sheen Priory the manor was granted to the arrester in the Gunpowder Plot Thomas Knyvet(t), who was elevated to the peerage. He left the manor to his nephew of the same name.
- 1618 — A brief was issued authorising the collection of money in churches in the southern counties "for repairing the bridge and causeway" at Staines; this compensated for inadequate tolls e.g. in 1619 (raised under the Staines Bridge Tolls Act 1509 (1 Hen. 8. c. 9)): £24 (equivalent to £5,607 in 2025)
- 1629 — Manor sold to Knyvet's relative Sir Francis Leigh of Puttenham. It stays with this family of owners until 1669
- 1669 — Sir William Drake bought the manor, held it for ten years and then sold it to Richard Tayler, in whose family it remained, with substantial sales of part, until 1890. The Middle Ages manor house was abandoned before 1600. Richard Taylor (d.1792) sets up the Lord of the manor's main residence at Charlton House, Charlton 2.5 miles (4.0 km) east.
- 1739 — The Staines Bridge Act 1739 notes that the bridge built in the 1680s was "in a ruinous and dangerous condition" and that the money raised from tolls and local taxes was insufficient to fund adequate maintenance.
- 1725 — The landless rectory providing substantial tithes over much of the parish (Note: Westminster Abbey remained technically rectors so appointed a Vicar, the arrangement nationally wherever vicars are appointed. Staines rectory did not remain with the Abbey, they sold it or were stripped of it.) was bought by John de Coussmaker seated at Normandy, Surrey who fled Holland with the late King (William III of England (William of Orange)

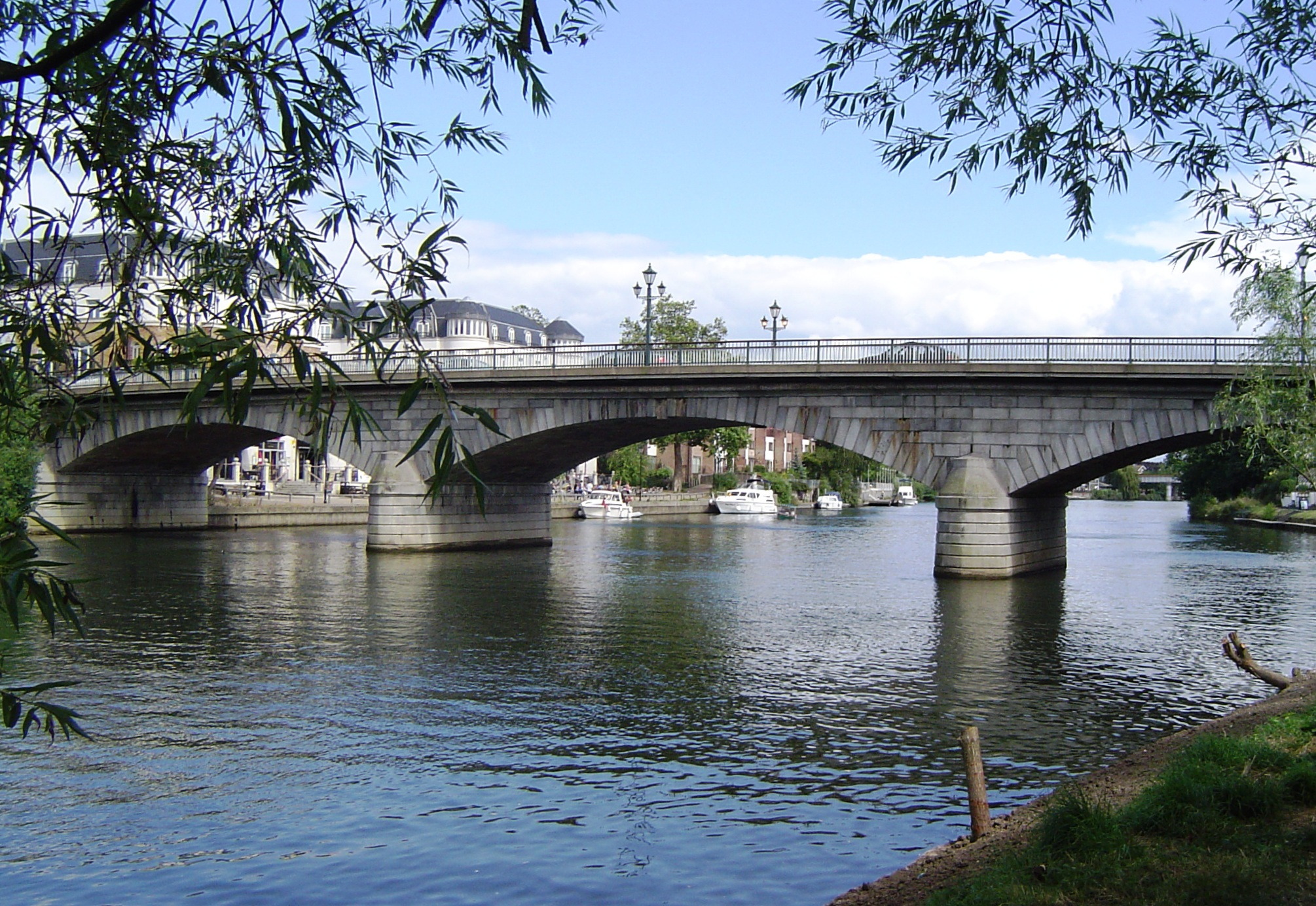
As in the main period of Roman occupation of Britain, Staines Bridge was the main crossing on the road from London to much of Hampshire and to the south-western counties (excluding their northern parts such as Gloucestershire, north Somerset and north Wiltshire which could be accessed via the Bath Road). It returned to use for transport to Salisbury, Winchester, north Hampshire, Southampton, Dorset, Devon and Cornwall from at least 1222 until the late 1940s. The town then became bypassed by long-distance road traffic using the Runnymede Bridge (1961) designed by Edwin Lutyens. It further became bypassed by long-distance traffic after the construction of the M4 in England in 1971 and most of the M3 by 1974.

- 1832 — The current Staines Bridge was officially opened by King William IV (formerly the Duke of Clarence). Clarence Street is laid out the approach to the bridge retaining some older buildings.
- 1842 — Staines parishioners commuted the tithes by a payment and award of land to the Coussmaker family.
- 1848 — Railway line from London Waterloo to Staines opened. It was extended in 1856, see below, and with shorter extensions to Windsor, Weybridge and a now-defunct one to West Drayton.
- 1851 — Staines Boat Club was founded
- 1856 — The Staines, Wokingham & Woking Junction Railway opened the line between Staines and Wokingham on 9 July.
- 1862 — Opening of the Staines Linoleum Company, founded by businessman Frederick Walton, to produce his new invention of Linoleum floor covering.
- 1872 — The vestry agree to demolish the 18th century market building and those next door and replace it with a Town Hall.
- 1877 — A curve linking the Ascot and Datchet railway lines was opened in April and remained in use until March 1965.
- 1890 — Staines Hockey Club was formed, making it one of the oldest hockey clubs in the World. Its early years were very illustrious with several internationals playing for the club and a number of gold medals won by Staines members in the 1908 Olympic Games
- 1892 — Staines Town Football Club formed, as Staines Albany Football Club.

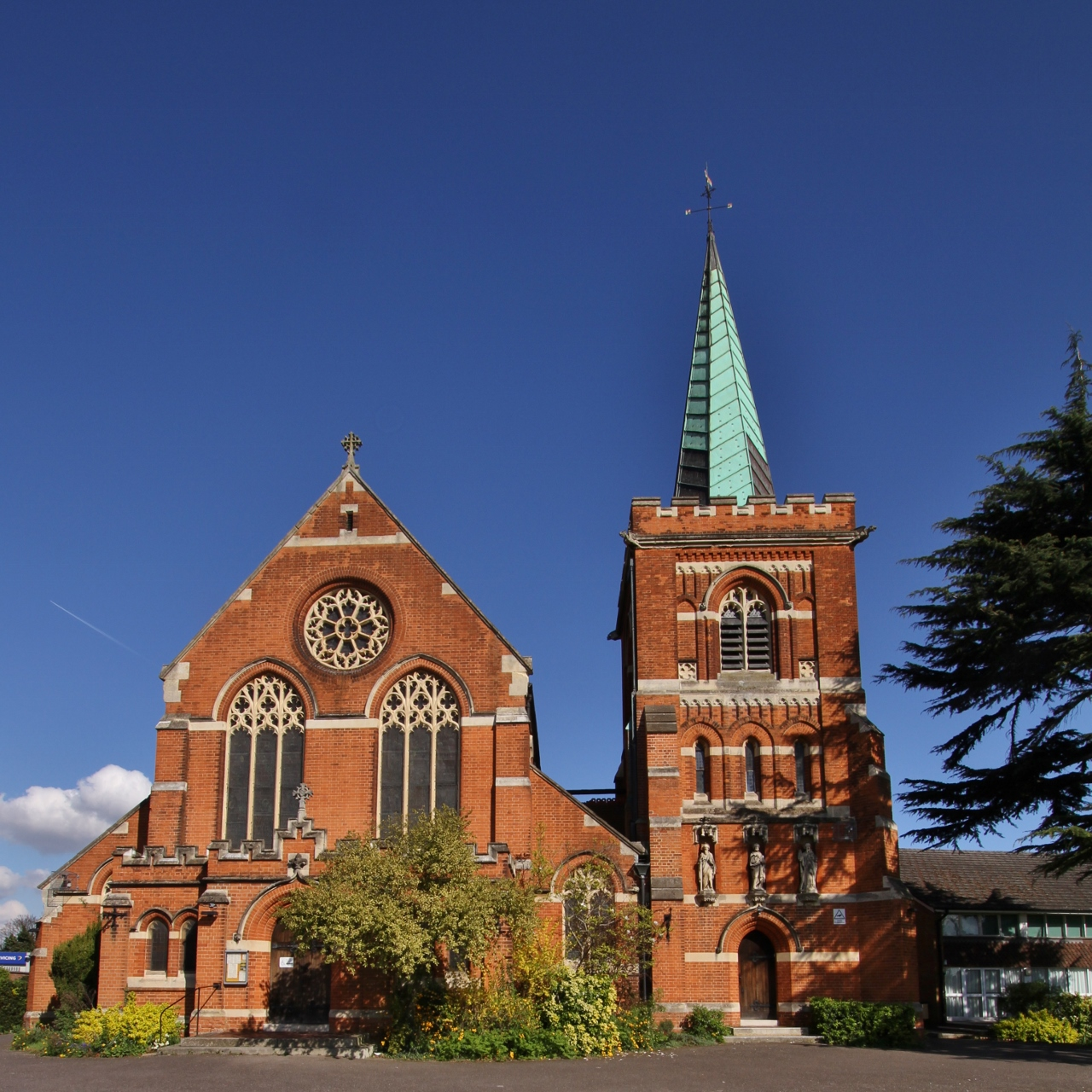
St Peter's parish church, designed by George Fellowes Prynne and built 1892–94 with the aid of Sir Edward Clarke

- 1894 — Staines Urban District created, superseding the responsibilities of the Sanitary District and parish
- 1896 — Staines Urban District abolishes the annual fairs for clogging the main street and the town's small market square
- 1901 — Twin Staines Reservoirs in Stanwell and Staines parishes built by the Metropolitan Water Board, to provide consistent quality and supplies of drinking water for London
- 1906 — The American Wilbur Gunn founded the British car maker Lagonda in Staines, making its first cars that year
- 1908 — The first Scout Troop in Staines was formed, the 1st Staines & Egham Hythe Troop
- 1919 — The British car maker Tamplin was founded in 1919 in Staines, and named after its founder, Edward Tamplin
- 1935 — 24 Hours of Le Mans car race was won by a 4.5 litre Lagonda car built at Staines
- 1936 — Opening of Staines Bus Garage
- 1945 — Staines becomes the main town in the Spelthorne constituency of the House of Commons on the loss of Teddington.
- 1954 — The Matthew Arnold School is officially opened by Lord Lucan on 24 May 1954
- 1957 — Yeoveney Manor, from at least 1066 land of Westminster Abbey (who kept rights until the 20th century), farmed by tenants, Greenwood Bros, reduced to 150 acres — earlier in the century a rifle range for training was set up here.
- 1961 — Sir Edwin Lutyens's Runnymede Bridge opened to allow the A30's Staines Bypass to allow traffic from London to the south-west to bypass the town.
- 1965 — Staines Urban District was transferred from Middlesex to Surrey
- 1965 — Staines West railway station closed. The station building survives intact and is Grade II listed. The buffer stop still survived. The platform area is now part of a car park and the tracks have been removed to make way for a small building .
- 1972 — British European Airways Trident One jet airliner crashed on 18 June alongside the Staines bypass killing all 118 passengers and crew
- 1974 — Staines U.D. is merged with Sunbury (on Thames) U.D. to form Spelthorne Borough and building commences for council offices at Knowle Green, Staines used funds of most of the Sunbury site
- 1980 — The Elmsleigh Centre was opened by HM The Queen in February 1980
- 1980 — Spelthorne Museum is established in the Old Fire Station as a result of archaeological excavations during construction of the Elmsleigh Centre in the 1970s.
- 1990 — Spelthorne Leisure Centre, Knowle Green opens
- 1993 — The disused Old Town Hall was converted to an Arts Centre. It was officially opened on 15 April 1994 by actor and director Kenneth Branagh.
- 1996 — Planning permission was granted for Two Rivers shopping centre, cinema and gym in Staines Town Centre
- 1996 — Closure of Staines Bus Garage
- 2002 — Sacha Baron Cohen's character Ali G debuts in the film Ali G Indahouse, with Staines as his fictional hometown. Much of the filming was in Staines.
- 2005 — Hard-Fi's debut album Stars of CCTV was released and nominated for the Mercury Music Prize
- 2006 — Hard-Fi's success continued as the group followed a sold-out tour of the UK with two BRIT Award nominations
- 2012 — Following other examples, the town's official name changes from Staines to Staines-upon-Thames on 20 May 2012

== Most relevant neighbouring settlement events ==
- 1803 — Richard Bingham, 2nd Earl of Lucan acquired Laleham Manor; the family later acquire some land in the parish of Staines.
- 1886 — Royal Holloway, University of London was founded by Thomas Holloway and opened by Queen Victoria on the far side of less-urbanised Egham.
- 1925 — Queen Mary Reservoir opened in former rural village of Littleton but close to town centre of Ashford
- 1971 — M4 motorway opened through Berkshire, using the Maidenhead bypass built in 1961 to ease demand for the A4 route and to cater to an expected increase in motorised private and goods transport
- 1974 — M3 motorway opened through Surrey for the above reason and to ease demand for the Staines bypass and A30 route.
- 1976 — Queen Mother Reservoir opened in rural villages of Horton and Wraysbury
- 1985 — M25 opened, in the parishes of Wraysbury and Egham and became nicknamed after the nearest large town "the Staines section and junction".

== See also ==
- Spelthorne Hundred
- St Mary's, Staines

== Notes and references ==
Notes

Bibliography

- Maryfield, Pamela (2006). Staines : A history. Chichester: Phillimore. ISBN 978-1-86-077420-1.
- Mills, John (1993). A guide to the industrial history of Spelthorne. Guildford: Surrey Industrial History Group. ISBN 978-0-95-096976-3.
- Mitchell, Vic; Smith, Keith (1989). Branch lines around Ascot : from Ash Vale, Weybridge, Staines and Wokingham. Midhurst: Middleton. ISBN 978-0-90-652064-2.
