= Spelthorne =

Spelthorne may refer to:

- Borough of Spelthorne, a local government district in the county of Surrey, England
- Spelthorne (UK Parliament constituency), Surrey constituency in the British House of Commons
- Spelthorne College, was a single-campus sixth form college on High Street, Ashford, Surrey, England
- Spelthorne Hundred, of the historic county of Middlesex, England
- Spelthorne Sports F.C., is a football club based in the borough of Spelthorne
