= Spelthorne College =

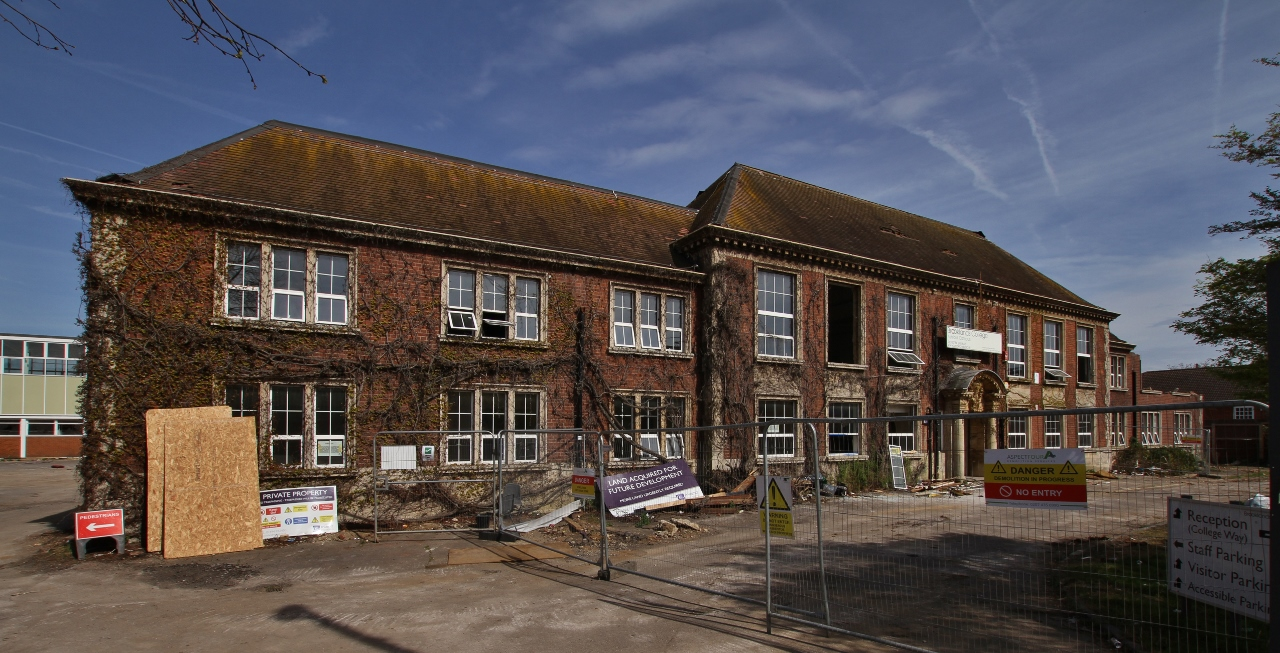
- The main redbrick building, dating to 1911, with stone dressings, and dentillated eaves to the centre bay, during its demolition.

Location
- Church Road; Ashford, Surrey (Middlesex), TW15 2XD; England; 51.435°N 0.463°W

Information
- Type: further education college
- Established: 1911
- Founder: Middlesex County Council
- Closed: 2007
- Local authority: Surrey
- Gender: Mixed
- Age: 16+
- Former name: Ashford Sixth Form College 1975; Ashford County Grammar School (1911–75)

Spelthorne College was a sixth form college on Church Road, the main street of Ashford, Surrey/Middlesex, England. Spelthorne College began in 1975 as the successor to both Ashford and Sunbury Sixth Form Colleges. Its main building and its teaching of 16-18 year-old students date to 1911 as Ashford County Grammar School, a time of rapid expansion of the town. The school within a few years had a sixth form and changed after other schools were built to become a dedicated, sixth form college in 1975 at the same time as recently built Ashford High/Thomas Knyvett School on the north-west side of town expanded. In 2007 it merged for nine years with Brooklands College with several buildings continuing, for teaching, until 2016 when they were demolished. It taught several notable alumni and nearest further education destinations, where sought, included Kingston or Isleworth Polytechnics, Reading, Royal Holloway University College or Brunel Universities.

== Former school ==
Middlesex County Council founded the school in 1911 as Ashford County Grammar School, funded by the combined county and district local rates collected by Staines Rural District Council (RDC). It taught children of secondary school age from 11 to 18.

In 1965 its county council was dissolved and Ashford was made part of Surrey though not in the Royal Mail regime of "postal counties" that was in place until 1995. In 1974 Staines RDC was dissolved with others in favour of new entity: Spelthorne Borough Council. The school with sixth form continued until 1975 when Surrey County Council, investing in the school now known as Thomas Knyvett College on the north-west side of the town made it into Ashford Sixth Form College. In the same year the college absorbed pupils and staff from Sunbury Sixth Form College and was renamed Spelthorne College.

Spelthorne College's archive is lodged with Spelthorne Museum.

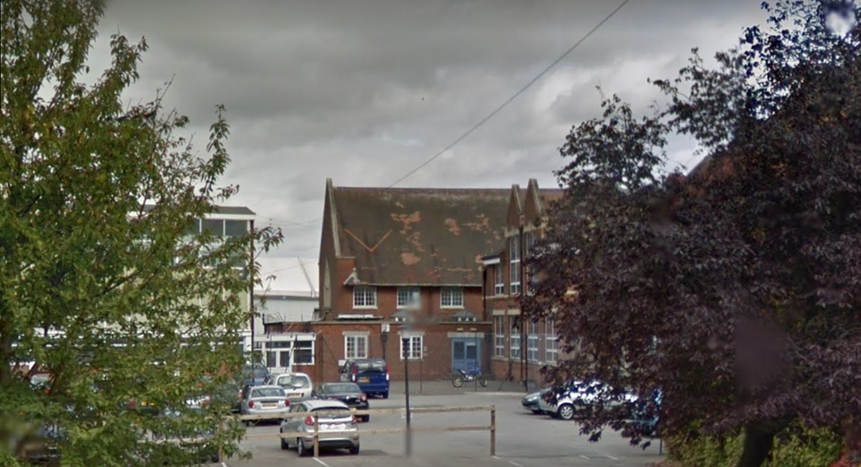
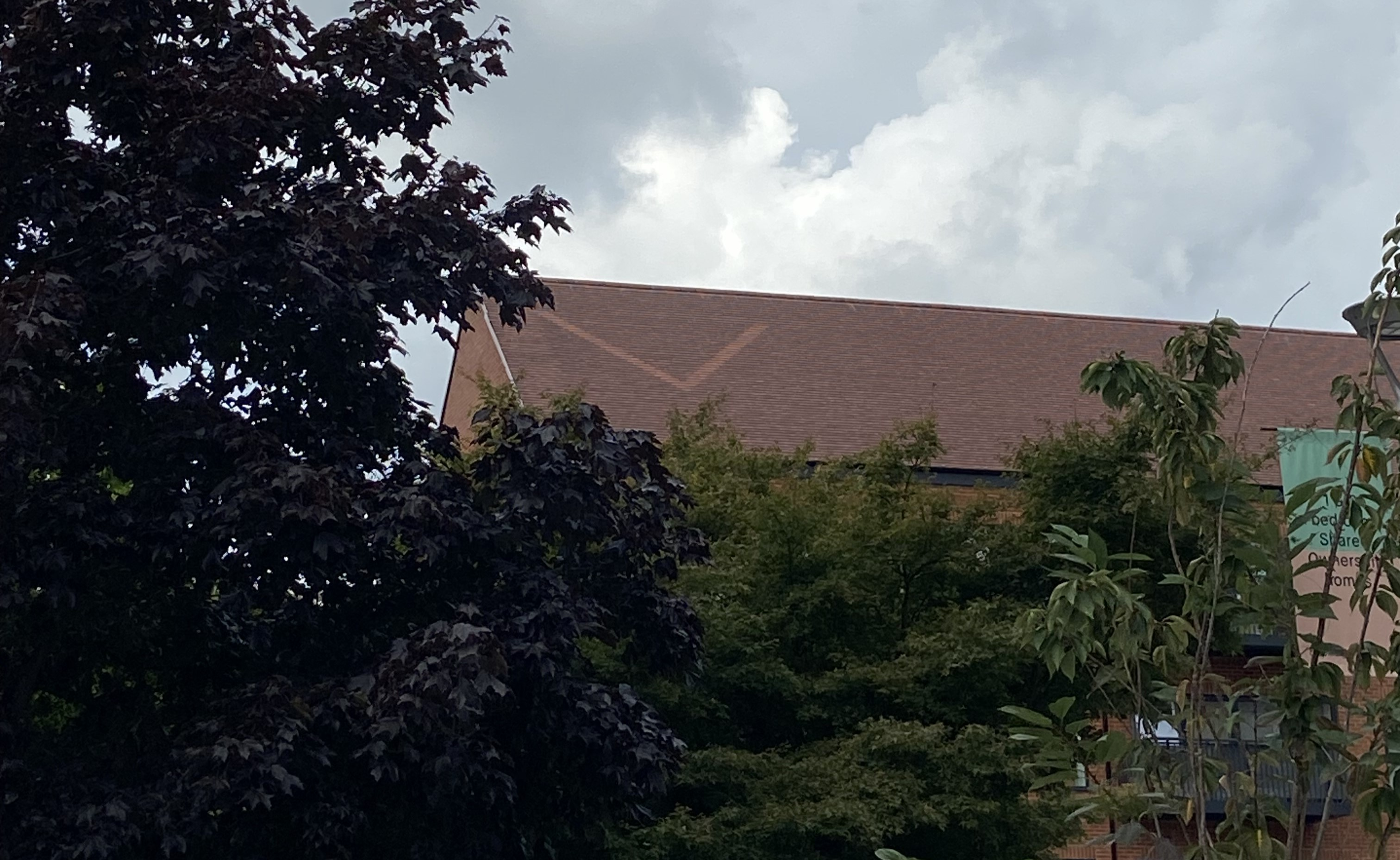
The "V for Victory" tiled into the roof of the original building (top), and replicated on the new development (bottom).

== Merger ==
As the college provided education to young people of 16 years old or more, in 1992 its funding passed to the Further Education Funding Council for England, later replaced by the Learning and Skills Council. The college performed well in external reviews, for instance gaining 23–24 points in the Quality Assurance Agency for Higher Education's (QAA) review of its higher education provision in business studies.

== Brooklands College ==
A Strategic Area Review in 2004 by the Learning Skills Council recommended that to expand and modernise the college's premises it merge with a larger institution. On 1 August 2007 the merger with Brooklands College was completed, to operate as the Ashford Campus, the other campus being the Brooklands College's Weybridge campus.

== Redevelopment ==
After Spelthorne College was dissolved in 2007, Inland Homes plc acquired its campus of 10 acres (4 ha) and sought planning permission to redevelop it. On 8 February 2017 Spelthorne Borough Council refused planning permission to redevelop the site as shops, a public square and 366 homes in buildings ranging from one to six storeys high. Inland Homes disregarded the decision and on 20 February started demolishing the buildings. The council issued an order to stop, and demolition ceased on 21 February. The demolition later went ahead after receiving planning permission to build 357 new homes on the site.

The north-west corner of the original buildings included a "V for Victory" symbol which was tiled into the south-facing roof by workers repairing bomb damage during the London Blitz. This has been replicated on the east-facing roof at the front of the new development.

== Alumni ==
Ashford County Grammar School, Sunbury and Ashford Sixth Form Colleges and Spelthorne College:

- Don Bennett, who played cricket for Middlesex 1950–68
- Nicholas Bond-Owen, child actor of the 1970s and '80s who played Tristram Fourmile in the sitcom George and Mildred
- Brian Capron, actor in Coronation Street from the Sunbury Sixth Form College
- Susannah Clapp, theatre critic of The Observer since 1997
- Robert Evans, MEP for London North West 1994–99 and one of the MEPs for London 1999–2009
- Richard Johnson, who played cricket for Middlesex and England 1992–2007
- Gary Numan, musician
- Arthur Palmer, MP for Wimbledon 1945–50, Cleveland 1952–59, Bristol Central 1964–74, and Bristol North East 1974–83
- Sid Russell (1937–94), who played cricket for Middlesex (1960–64) and Gloucestershire (1965–68) and football for Brentford F.C. 1956–61
- Wendy Smith-Sly, Olympic athlete who competed mainly in 3000 metres running events
- Irene Thomas, radio quiz show personality
- Norman Willis, TUC General Secretary 1984–93
