= Farmoor Reservoir =

Reservoir in Oxfordshire, England

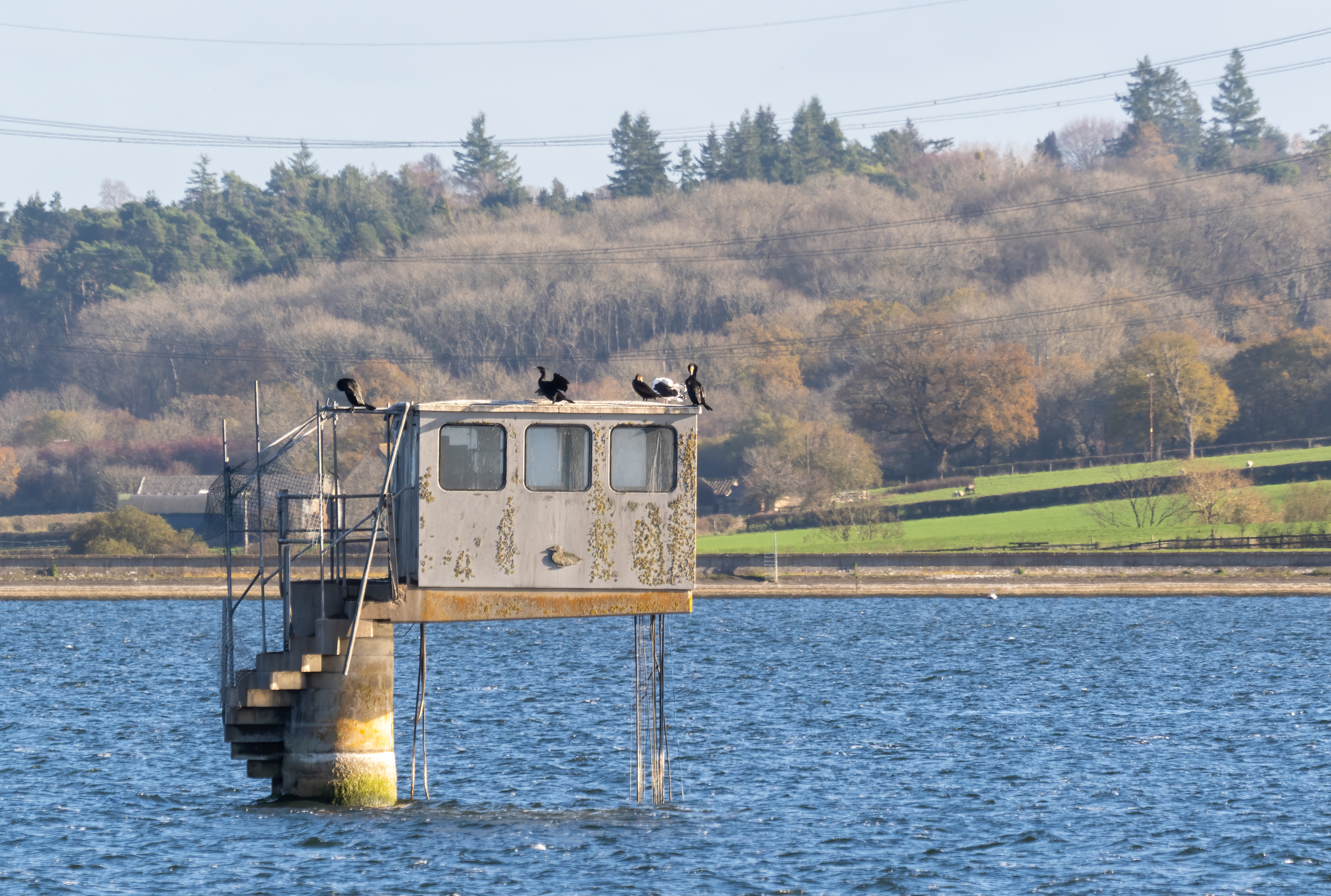
- Limnological tower, with great cormorants and a great black-backed gull on top, in the Farmoor Reservoir, 2025

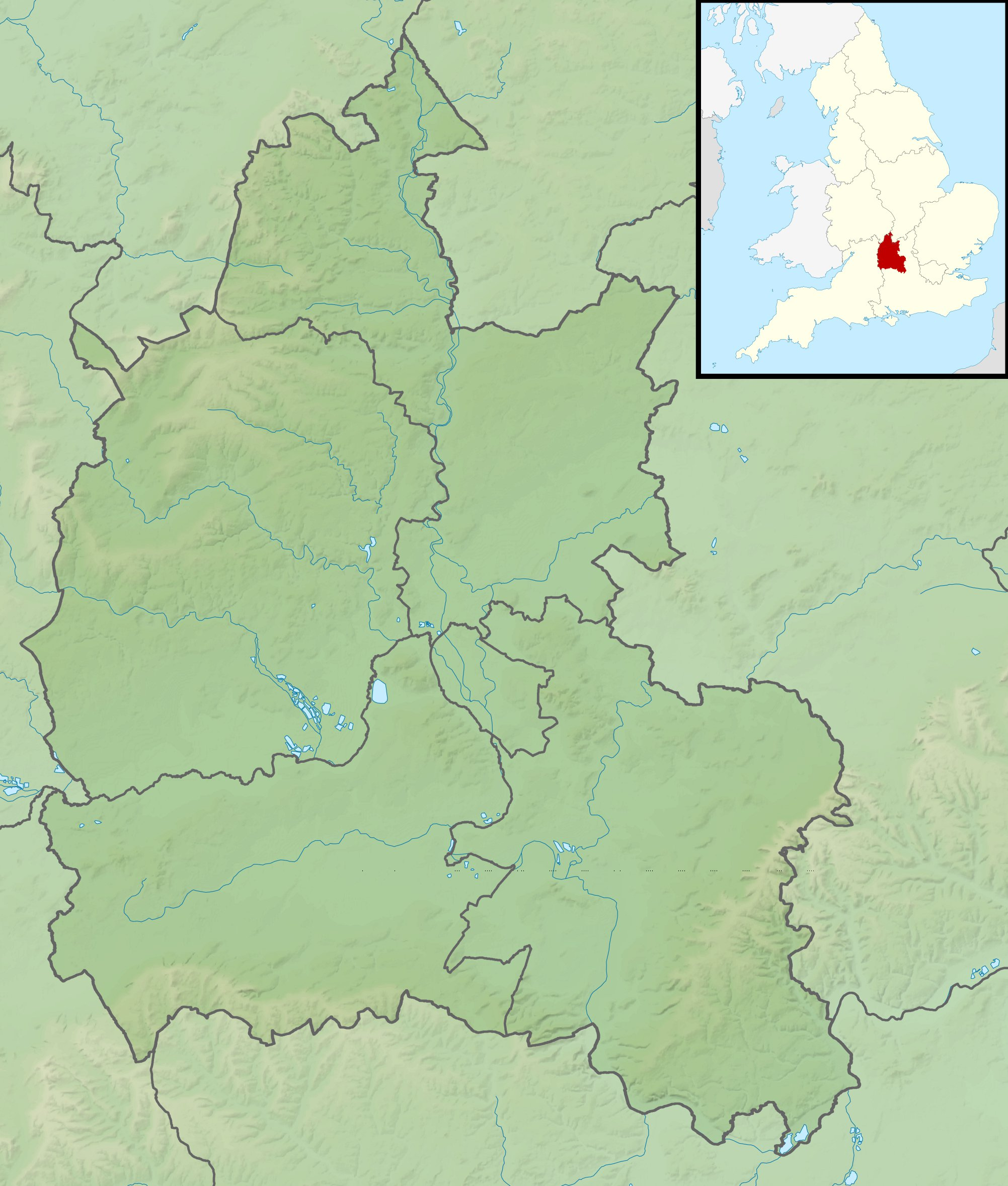
- Location within Oxfordshire
- Location: Oxfordshire
- Coordinates: 51.75543°N 1.35671°W
- Type: Reservoir
- Primary inflows: Abstraction from River Thames
- Primary outflows: Farmoor water treatment works, River Thames
- Catchment area: 0.77 km^{2} (0.30 sq mi)
- Basin countries: United Kingdom
- Max. length: 1.71 km (1.06 mi)
- Max. width: 1.1 km (0.68 mi)
- Surface area: 1.491 km^{2} (0.576 sq mi)
- Average depth: 4.898 m (16.07 ft)
- Water volume: 9.30 Gl (2.05×10^{9} imp gal)
- Surface elevation: 64 m (210 ft)
- Website: www.thameswater.co.uk

Farmoor Reservoir is a public supply reservoir at Farmoor, Oxfordshire, England, about 5 miles (8 km) west of Oxford. It is adjacent to the River Thames. Like most of the reservoirs in the Thames Valley, it is a pumped storage reservoir which was not formed by damming a watercourse in a valley. In this case the banks were raised above the local ground level using material excavated from within the bowl of the reservoir.

The reservoir is divided into two: Stage 1 to the north and Stage 2 to the south. The two reservoirs stages are separated by a causeway.

Farmoor reservoir
Parameter	Stage 1	Stage 2
Year completed	1967	1976
Capacity, million litres	4,544	9,298
Perimeter, miles (km)	1.7 (2.74)	2.4 (3.9)
Water outlet to:	Water treatment works	River Thames

The water improves in quality during its retention in the reservoir as solids settle and organic contaminants are adsorbed and degraded through a combination of natural biological processes aided by sunlight and oxygenation. As well as Oxford and other localities, Farmoor supplies the town of Swindon, some 25 miles (40 km) to the southwest via a trunk main installed in 1986. The reservoir is supplied by water abstracted from the River Thames at a flowrate of about 1.62 m^{3}/s or 140 million litres per day. Water enters the reservoir near the western end of the causeway.

== Operations ==
Farmoor Stage 2 was intended to supplement the flow of the Thames during periods of drought. The reservoir operated in conjunction with Swinford sewage treatment works. The project aimed to ensure that at least 135 million litres of water passed over Eynsham weir per day. The Stage 2 reservoir has two limnological towers to facilitate the study of aquatic ecosystems (limnology).

In 1989 an outbreak of Cryptosporidiosis affecting over 100 people was traced to drinking water supplies from Farmoor water treatment works. Investigations revealed a large build up of bacteria on the filter beds.

A report in 2018 suggested that if the reservoir's abstraction point from the Thames was moved 23 km downstream to Abingdon then a better water quality could be achieved.

== Recreation ==
The reservoir is used for sports: fishing (especially fly-fishing for rainbow and brown trout), dinghy sailing, windsurfing and stand up paddle boarding. Oxford SUP Club (stand-up paddle boarding), Oxford Sailing Club and the Oxford Sail Training Trust are based there. The latter offers sailing, windsurfing and powerboat courses. There is also access for bird watching and walking. There is a public car park.

=== Birds of Farmoor Reservoir ===
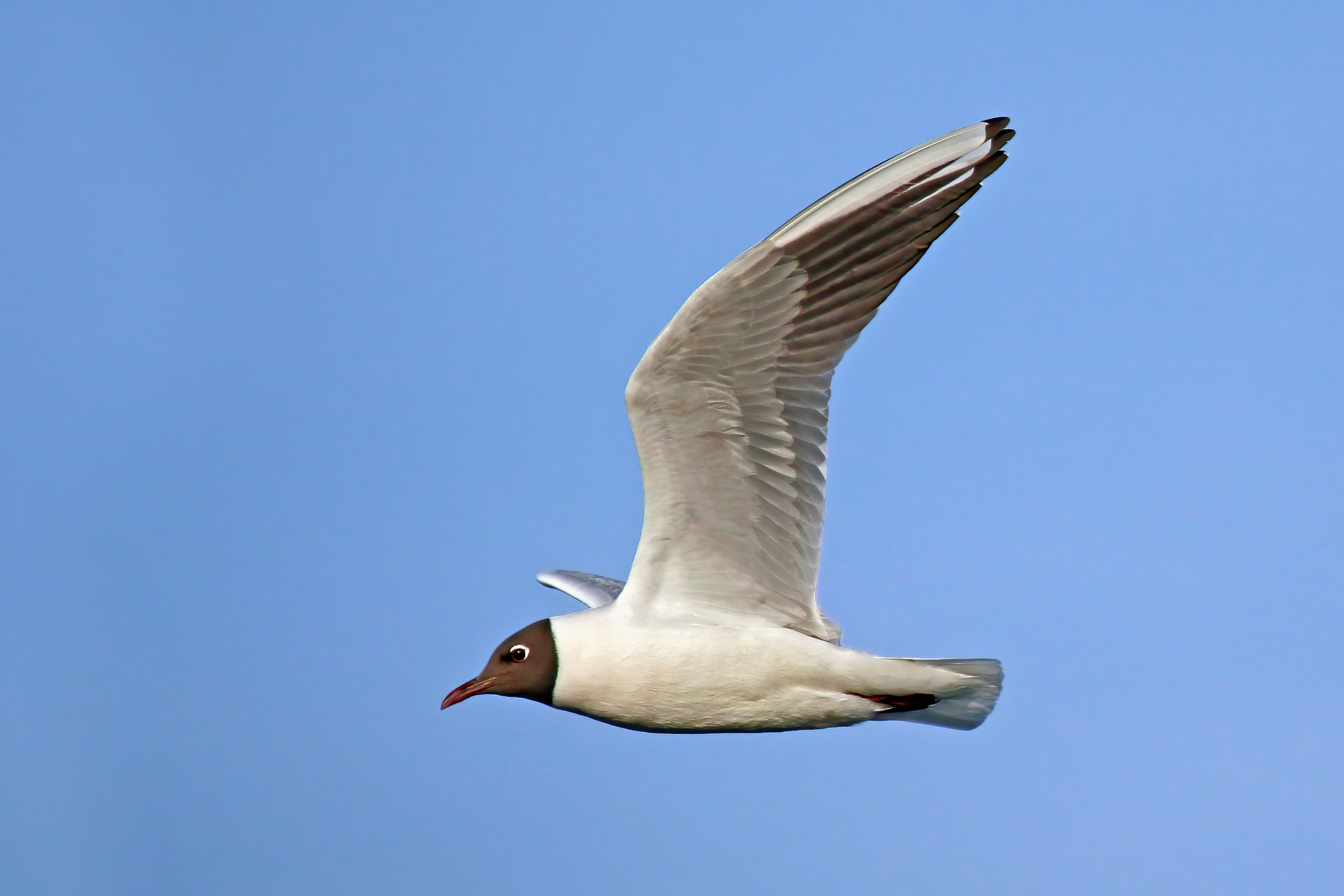
Black-headed gull

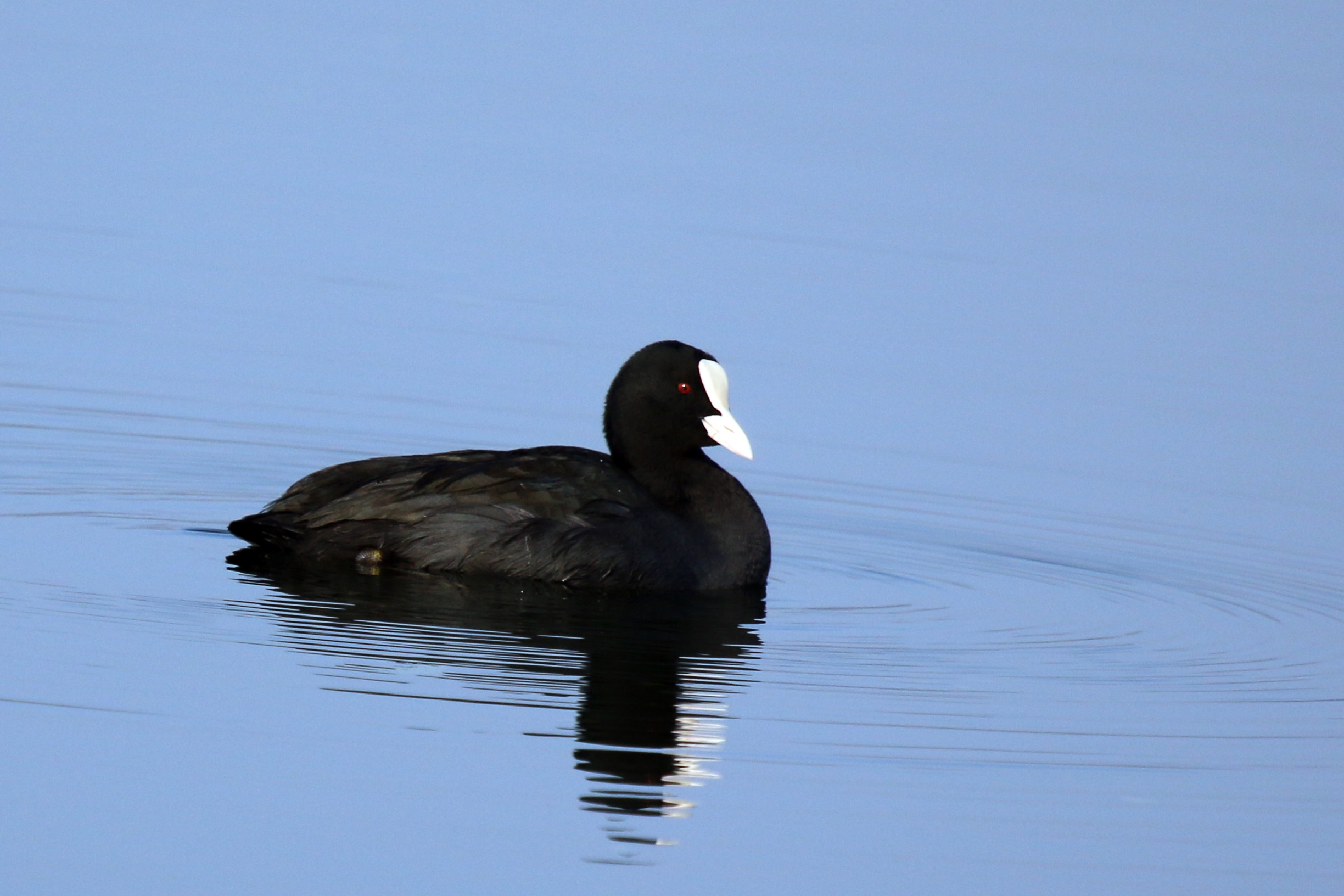
Eurasian coot

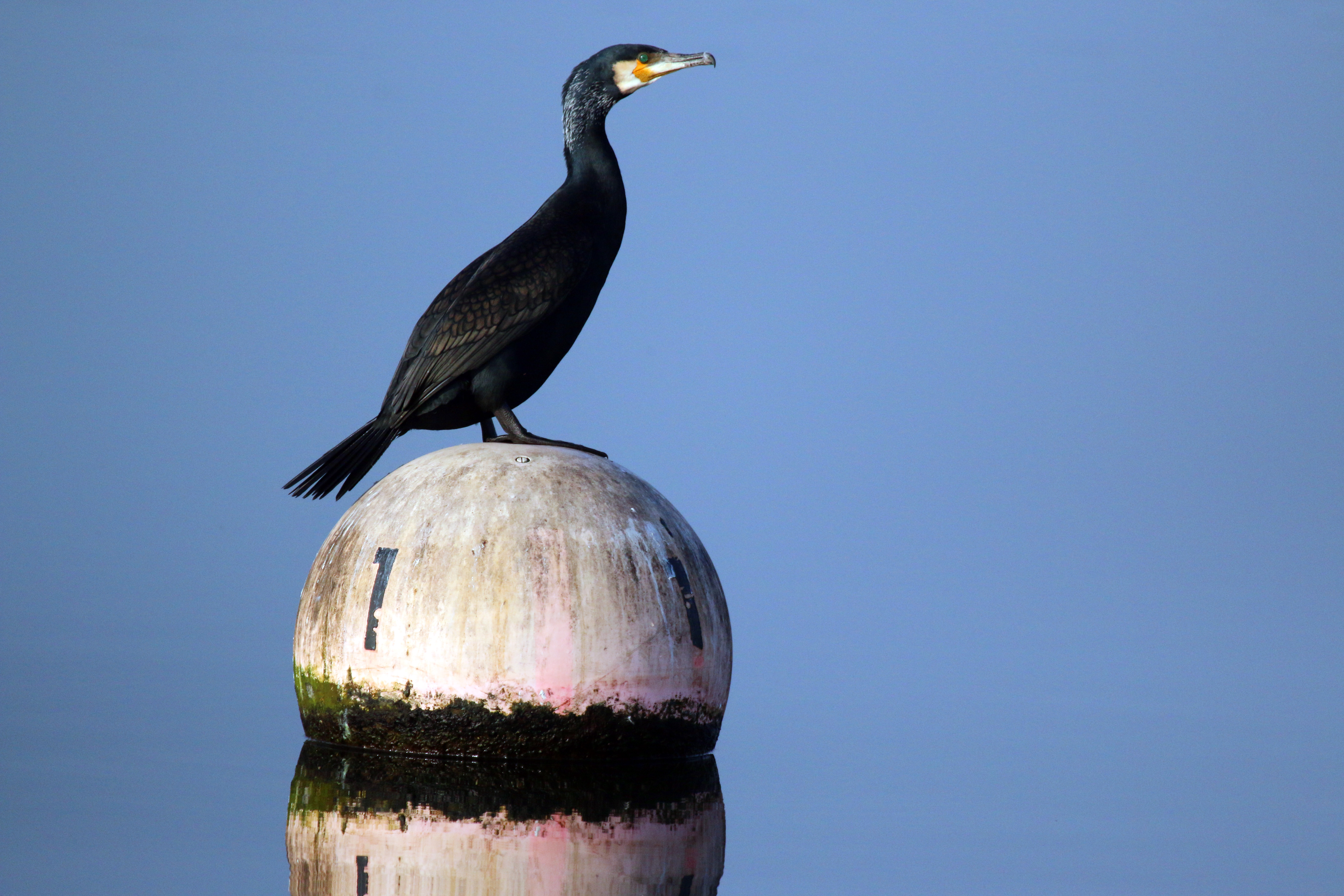
Great cormorant

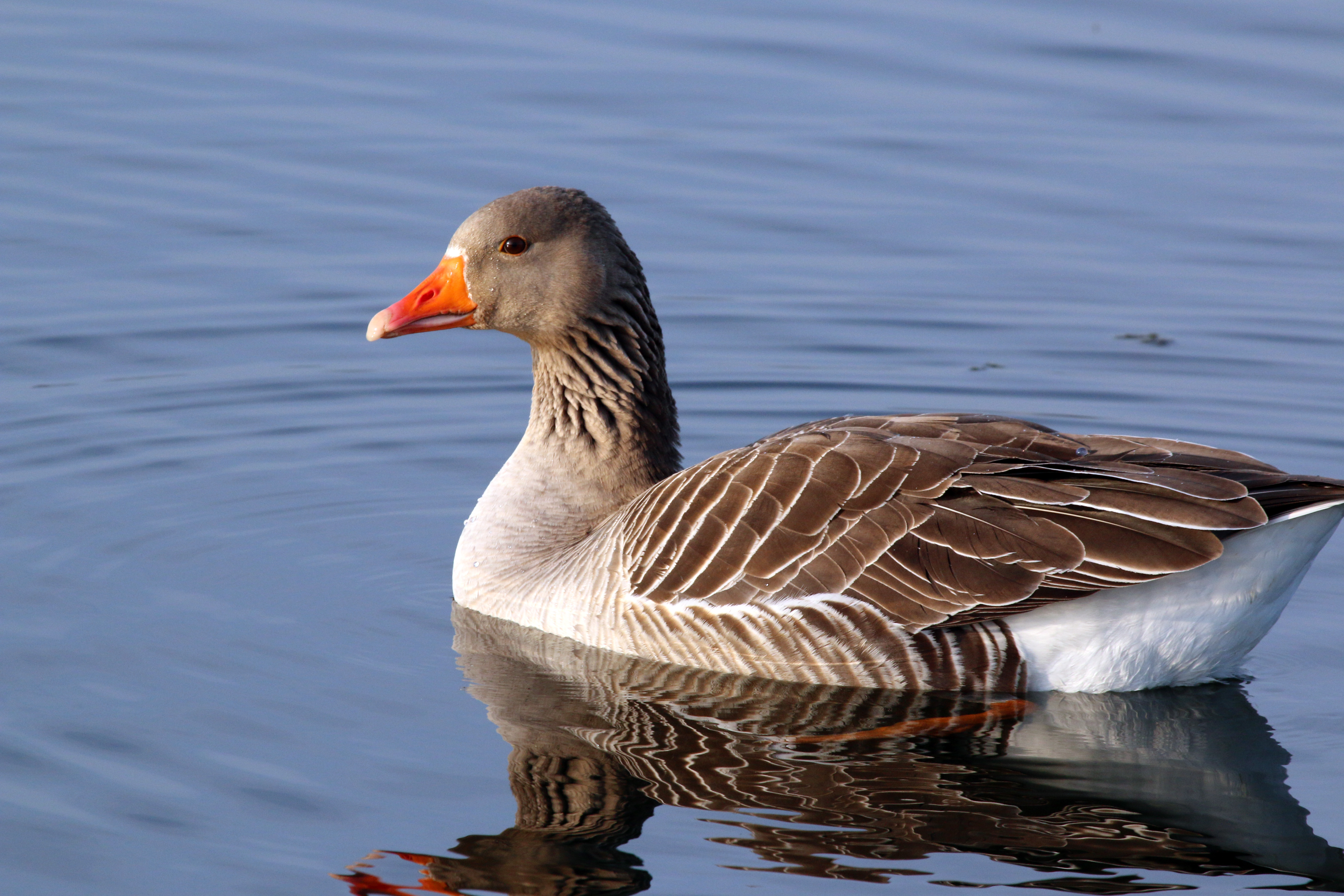
Greylag goose

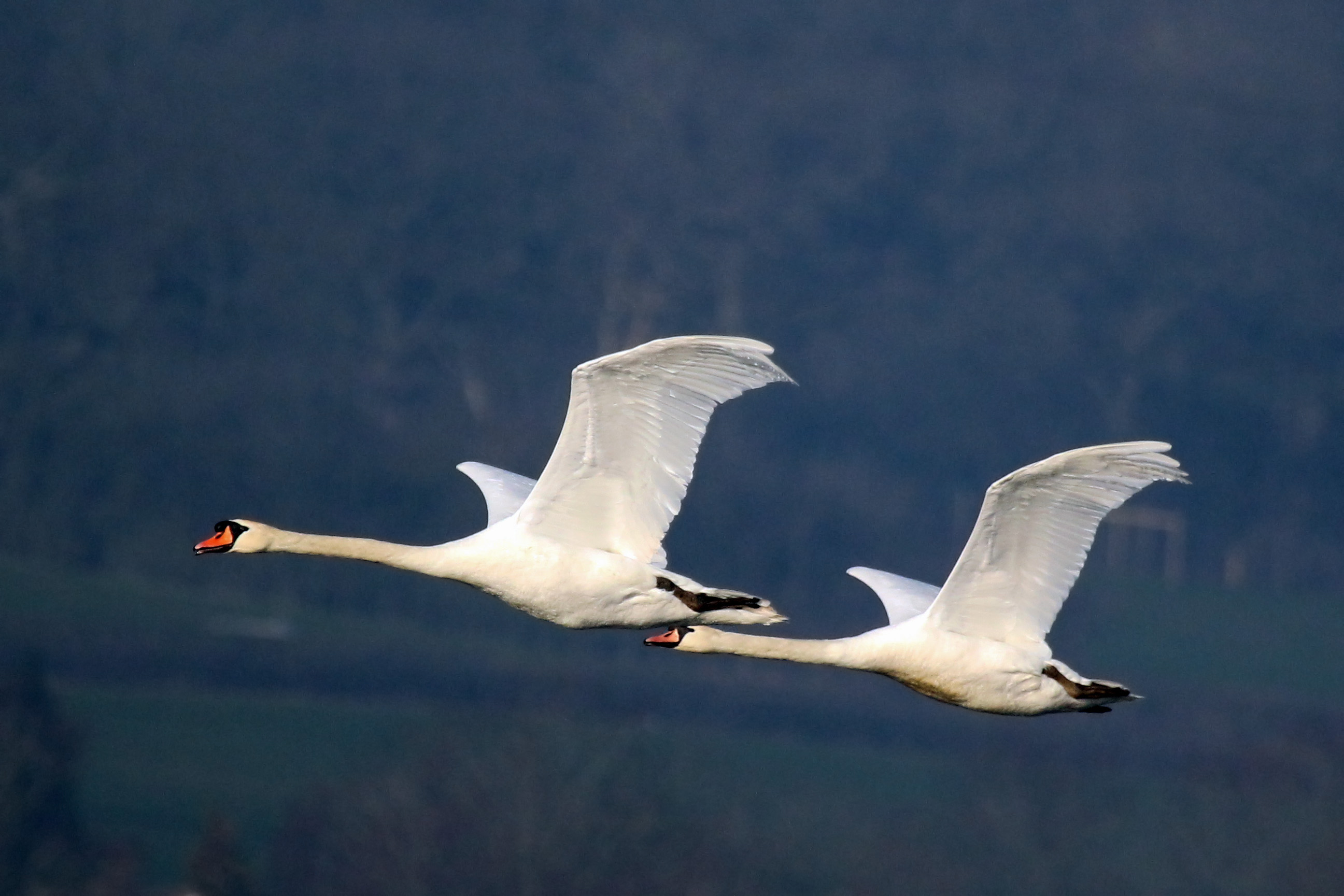
Mute swans

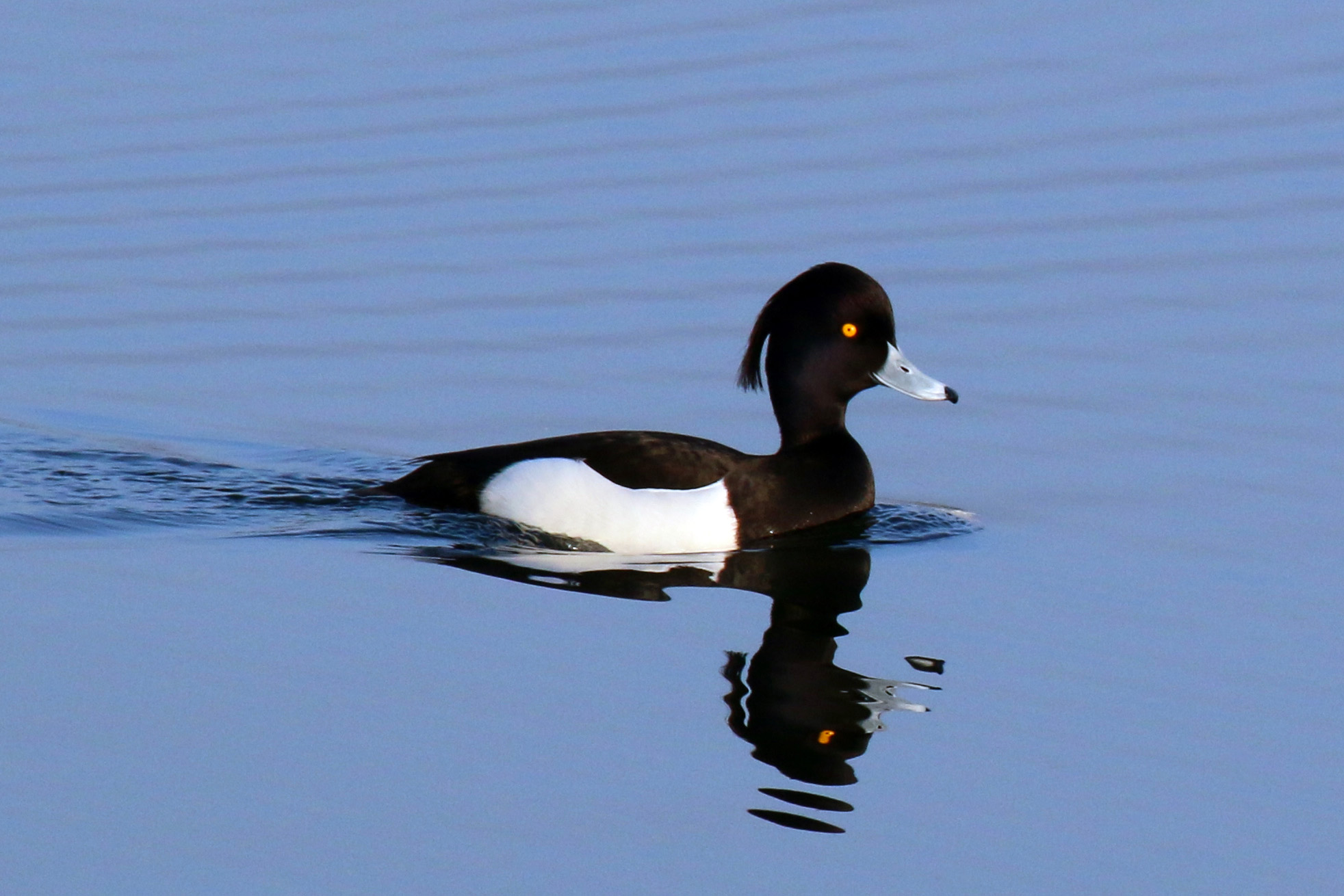
Tufted duck

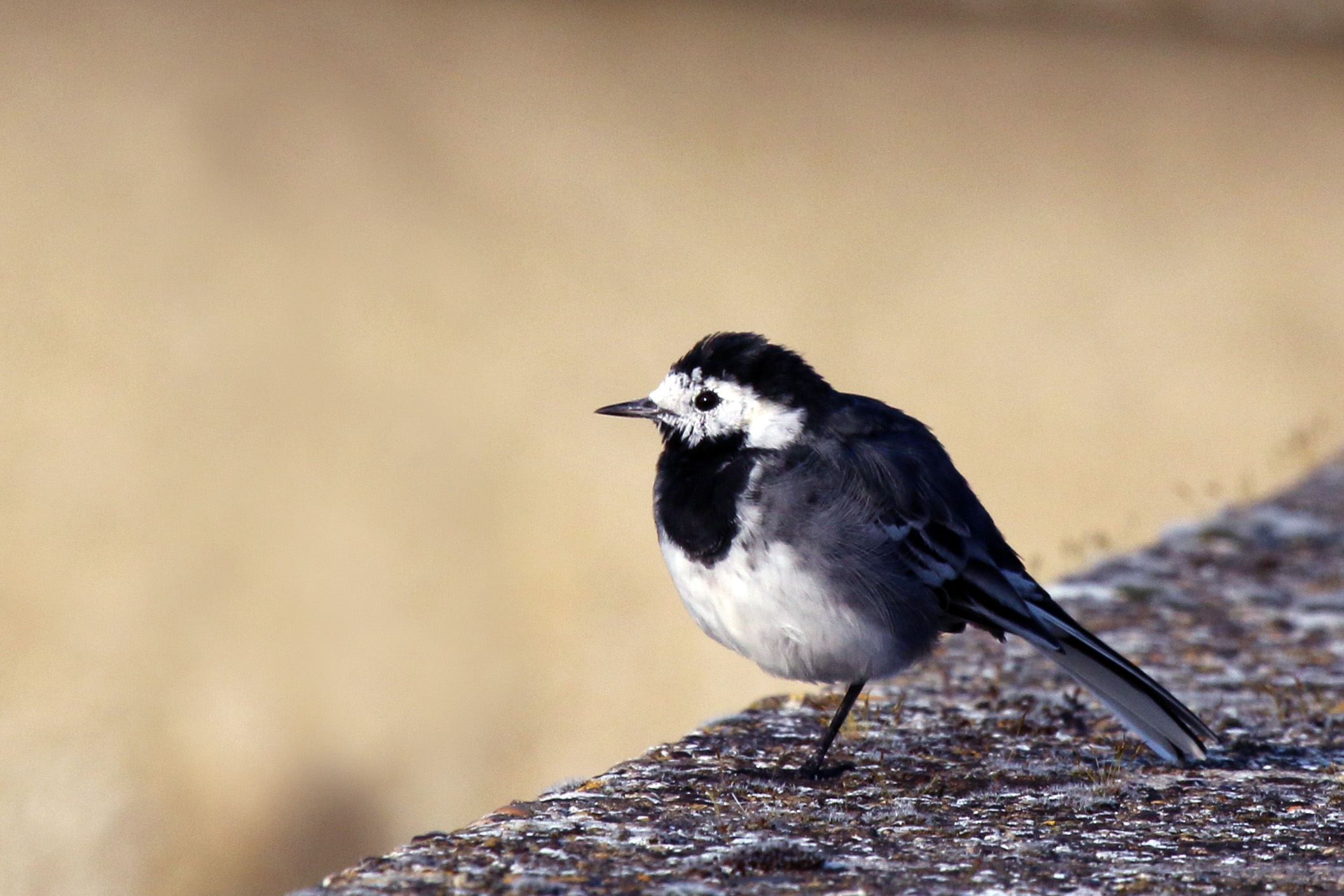
White wagtail

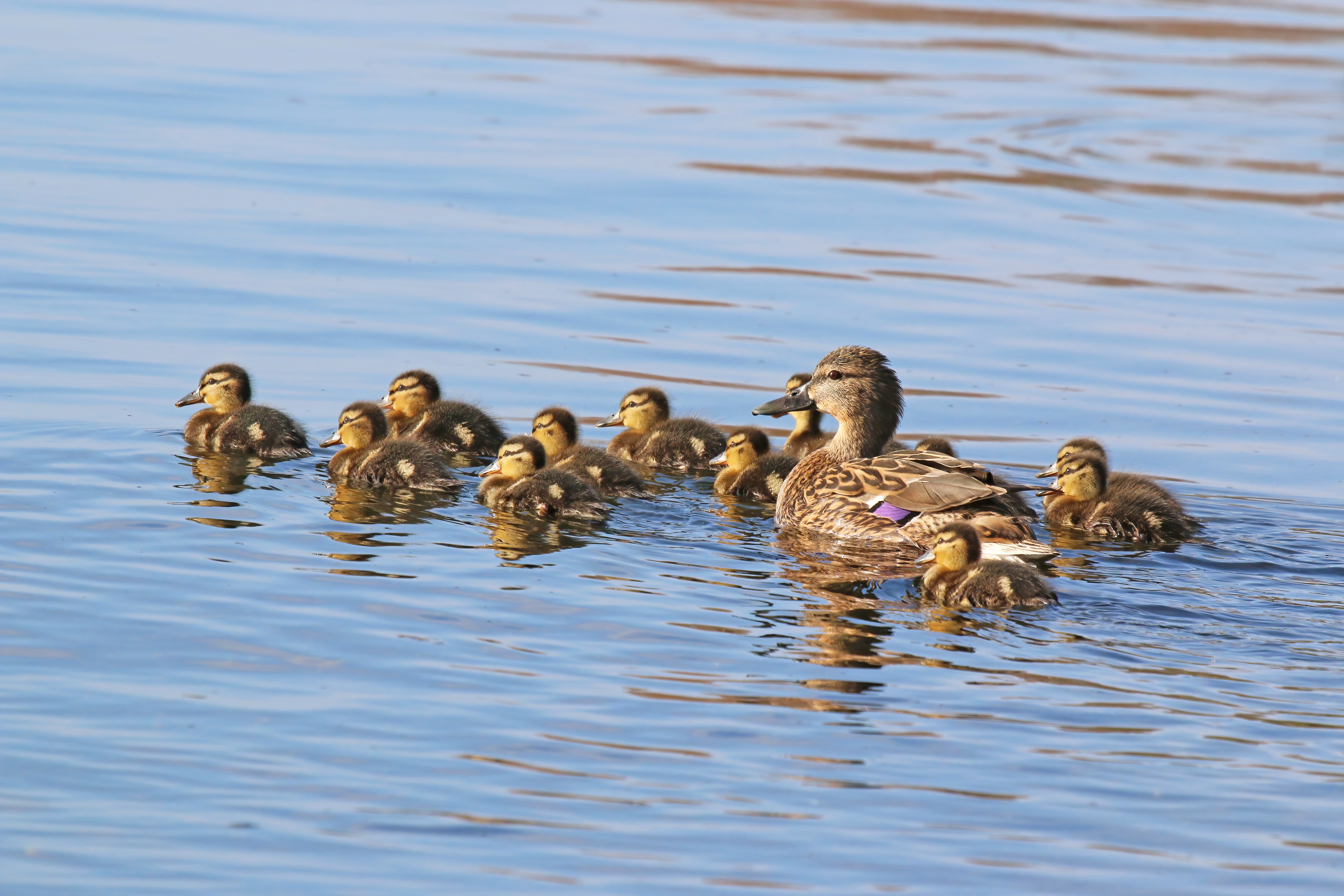
Mallard

== Farmoor Water Treatment Works ==
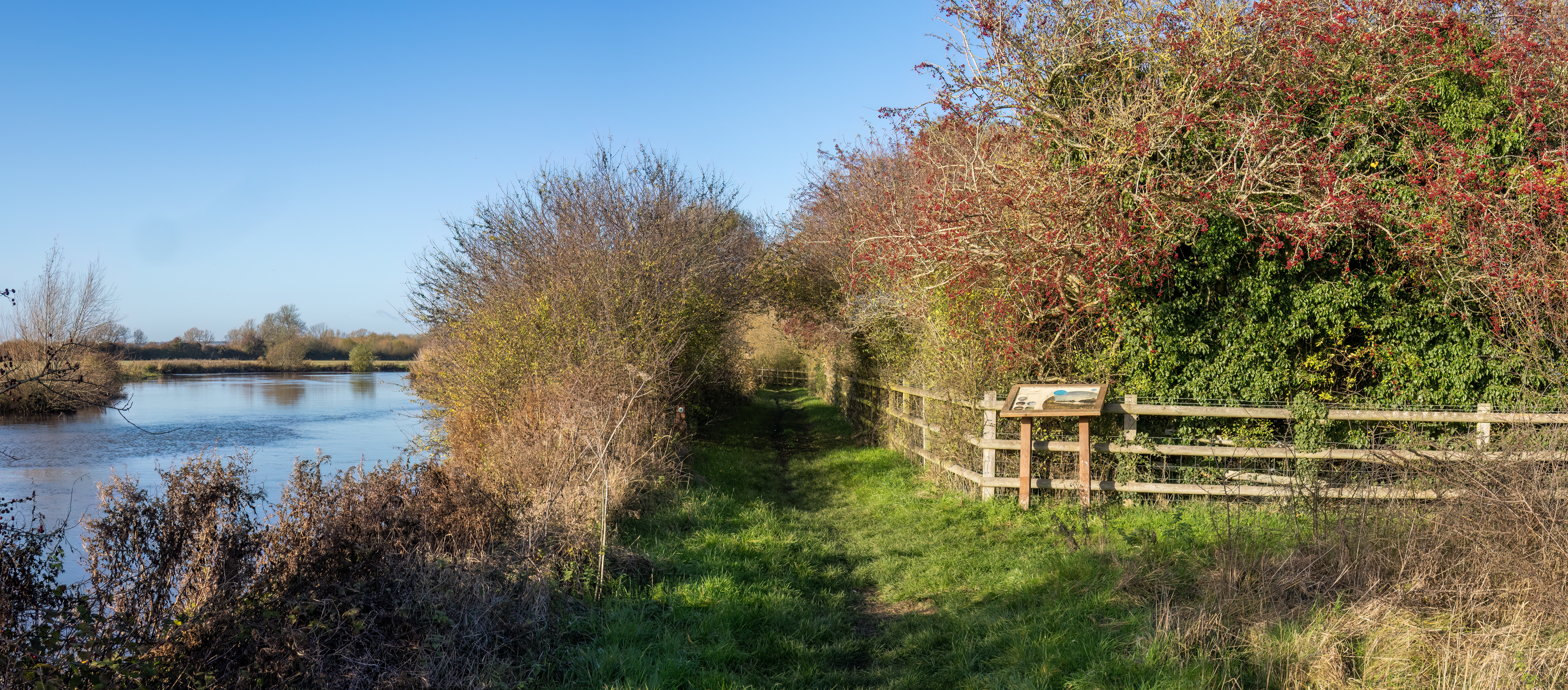
Nature trail along the Thames on the Farmoor Reservoir property

The Farmoor Water Treatment Works are located on the eastern side of the reservoir just north of the causeway. The works are capable of treating 98 million litres per day of raw water from the Farmoor reservoir. The works were originally constructed at the same time as the Farmoor reservoir: Stage 1 in 1963 and stage 2 in 1975. Further extensions were constructed in 1990 and 2009. The plant comprises:

- Slow sand filters for the primary removal of solids from reservoir water
- Rapid Gravity Filters (RGF) in which water flows through a medium, such as sand, where solids are retained. Periodic backwashing and air scouring remove the accumulated sludge.
- Granulated Activated Carbon Filters (GAC) for the filtration of partly treated water
- Sludge system including waste water plant, sludge thickening plant, sludge press room, and polyelectrolyte plant
- High lift pumps capable of pumping up to 98 million litres per day
- Chemical dosing including storage tanks and pumps for:
  - Sulphuric Acid
  - PaCl (polyaluminium chloride) dosing
  - Caustic dosing
