= Don Bennett (cricketer) =

English cricketer and footballer

Donald Bennett
- Born: 18 December 1933; Wakefield, Yorkshire
- Died: 12 June 2014 (aged 80)
- Education: Ashford County Grammar School
- Occupations: athlete and cricket administrator
- Spouse: Pat
- Children: two

Don Bennett

Donald Bennett (18 December 1933 – 12 June 2014) was an English first-class cricketer and footballer.

== Background ==
Don Bennett was born in Wakefield, Yorkshire.

As a right-arm fast-medium bowler and right-handed batsman, Bennett played for Middlesex County Cricket Club between 1950 and 1968, appearing in over four-hundred matches. He scored 10,656 runs and took 784 wickets in first-class cricket.

He went on to become a long-serving coach (1969-1997) before he retired after forty-seven years of service to the club.

In retirement, he was elected to the General Committee and also served a term as President.

In football, he joined Arsenal in 1950 as an amateur, and then as a professional a year later. He played as a winger and then fullback for nine years in the second XI.

In 1959 he moved to Coventry City where he made 73 appearances before retiring in 1962.

Mike Brearley, who kept wicket for Bennett in the bowler's later years, recalled him to be a "stylish middle-order batsman and a lithe and athletic fielder."

== Biography ==
=== Early life and football career ===
Bennett was born in Wakefield in Yorkshire, and educated at Ashford County Grammar School. He failed a medical while joining the British Armed Forces and joined Arsenal in 1950. After nine years in the second team he moved to Coventry City and made 73 appearances before retiring in 1962. He played as a full-back.

=== Cricket career ===
As a cricketer, Bennett made his first-class debut as a sixteen-year-old for Middlesex in 1950. He scored over 1,000 runs in a season in 1953 and 1955, and took 50 wickets in a season seven times. Bennett, who also played for the Marylebone Cricket Club, retired in 1968 and succeeded Jack Robertson as County Coach.

He remained coach for 29 years until his retirement in 1997, steering the county through its most successful period during the 1970s, 1980s and early 1990s. Middlesex won the County Championship, the Benson & Hedges Cup, the Gillette Cup, the Refuge Assurance Cup and the Sunday League under his guidance. He was known for his strong fitness ethic, introducing pre-season training. His obituaries in the Daily Telegraph and The Cricketer cite the influence of his football career on his attitude to fitness.

He later served as Chairman of the Cricket Committee and as a member of the General Committee. He was awarded a Life Vice-Presidency and he began a two-year term as president at the 2007 Annual General Meeting, succeeding Charles Robins. He was a popular coach and administrator with the players, respected by several who would enjoy international careers, "including such characters as Mike Gatting, John Emburey, Angus Fraser, Phil Edmonds, Mike Selvey, Mark Ramprakash and Phil Tufnell." "Not confident" with first team coaching according to Brearley, he instead focused on introducing young players to the club. "Don [was] a good judge of a cricketer, was tough with the younger players but also kind and well-disposed to them." The Daily Telegraph remarked that "His greatest talent, however, was for spotting young talent. Kept in touch by a network of trusted informants, he criss-crossed the country, visiting schools festivals and minor counties matches. There he was to be found unobtrusively sitting on a bench or leaning against a tree."

== Personal life ==
Bennett died at the age of 80 on 12 June 2014. He was survived by two sons and his wife, Pat.
