= James Lincoln (cricketer) =

English cricketer

Personal information
- Full name: James Edward Guy Lincoln
- Born: 29 October 1981 (age 45); Ashford, Surrey, England
- Batting: Right-handed
- Bowling: Right-arm medium-fast

Domestic team information
- Years: Team
- 2001–2003: Kent Cricket Board

Career statistics
Competition	List A
Matches	5
Runs scored	11
Batting average	3.66
100s/50s	0/0
Top score	10
Balls bowled	89
Wickets	1
Bowling average	87.00
5 wickets in innings	0
10 wickets in match	0
Best bowling	1/15
Catches/stumpings	0/–
- Source: Cricinfo, 12 November 2010

James Edward Guy Lincoln (born 29 October 1981) is an English cricketer. Lincoln is a right-handed batsman who bowls right-arm medium-fast. He was born at Ashford, Surrey.

Lincoln represented the Kent Cricket Board in List A cricket. His debut List A match came against the Hampshire Cricket Board in the 2001 Cheltenham & Gloucester Trophy. From 2001 to 2003, he represented the Board in 5 List A matches, the last of which came against Derbyshire in the 2003 Cheltenham & Gloucester Trophy. In his five List A matches, he scored 11 runs at a batting average of 3.33, with a high score of 10. With the ball he took a single wicket at a bowling average of 87.00, with best figures of 1/15.

He played club cricket for a number of sides, including Bickley Park and St Lawrence and Highland Court in the Kent Cricket League, winning three Kent Premier League titles with St Lawrence (2000, 2003 and 2007) and the accolade of being the best club cricketer in the South East of England in 2006 and 2007, as nominated by the Wisden Cricketer magazine.
