= Queen Mother Reservoir =

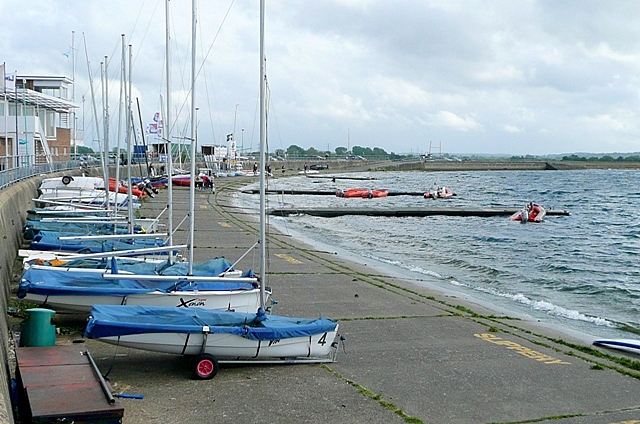
- Reservoir and sailing club

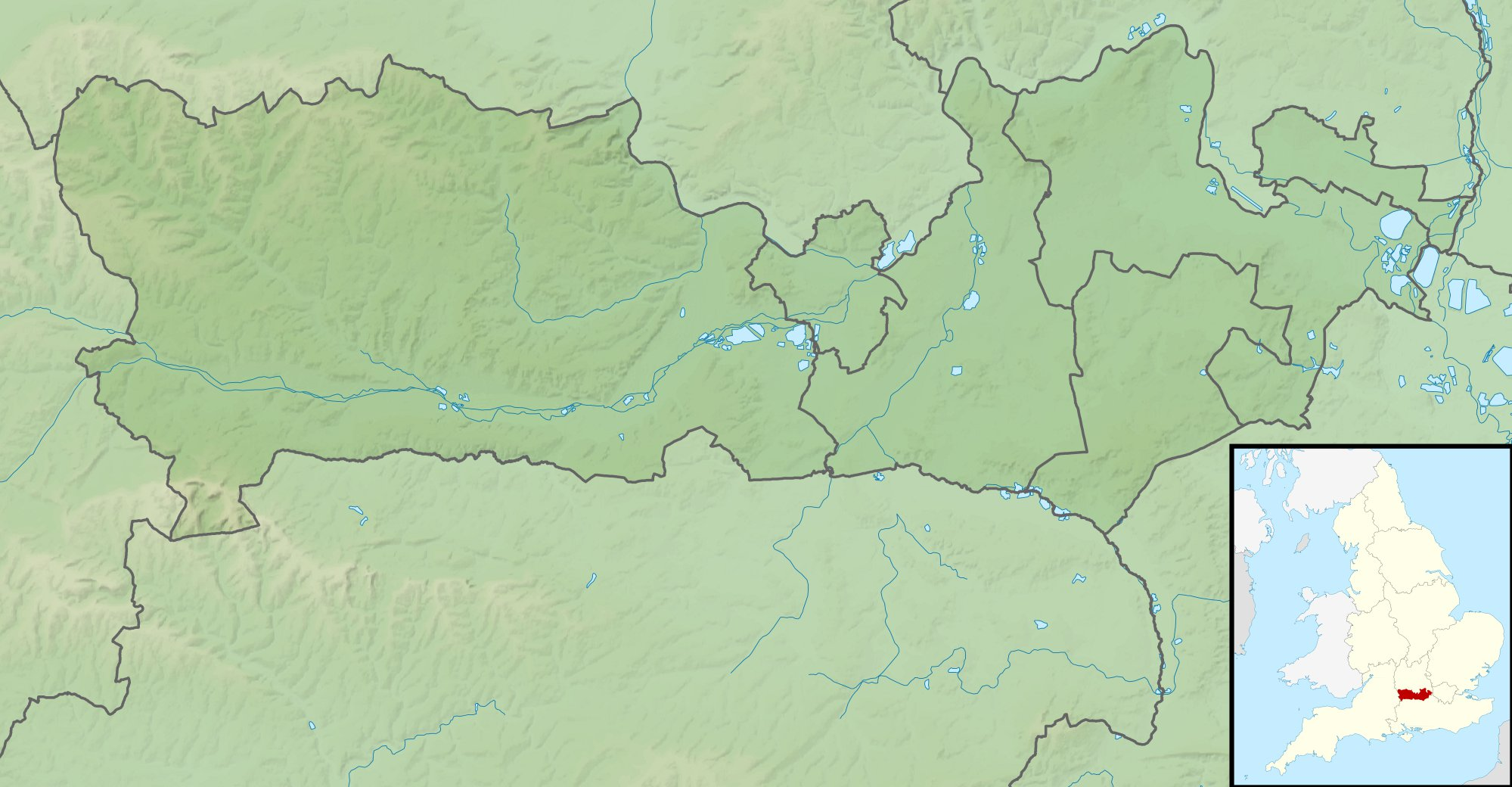
- Location within Berkshire
- Location: Berkshire, England
- Coordinates: 51°28′55″N 0°32′56″W
- Type: Bank side reservoir
- Basin countries: United Kingdom
- Surface area: 475 acres (1.92 km^{2})
- Water volume: 38,000 megalitres (1,300×10^{6} cu ft)

The Queen Mother Reservoir is a public water supply reservoir that lies between the M4 and the M25 to the west of London, close to Datchet. It is 475 acres (1.92 km^{2}) in size or about 1 km in diameter - making it one of the largest inland areas of water in Southern England. It is managed by Thames Water.

This is one of a number of reservoirs to the west of London and was built by W. & C. French and completed in 1976. It was inaugurated on 9 July that year by Queen Elizabeth the Queen Mother, after whom it is named. Its water is pumped from the River Thames nearby. The water improves in quality during its retention in the reservoir as solids settle and organic contaminants are adsorbed and degraded through a combination of natural biological processes aided by sunlight and oxygenation. Water from the reservoir is treated (often using slow sand filters) before being put into supply as London tap water. The reservoir contains a limnological tower.

During the design and early construction it was called the Datchet reservoir due to its closeness to the town.

Engineering design data for the Queen Mother reservoir is as follows.

Parameter	Value
Top water level above ordnance datum	35 m
Volume of water storage	37 million m^{3}
Maximum depth of water	23 m
Water area	192 ha
Maximum height of bank above ground	20 m
Perimeter of bank	5,350 m

The reservoir lies within the Colne Valley regional park and like other local reservoirs is popular for sailing and bird-watching. Petrels have been spotted at this reservoir.

== See also ==
- London water supply infrastructure
