= Limnological tower =

Structure for the study of aquatic ecosystems

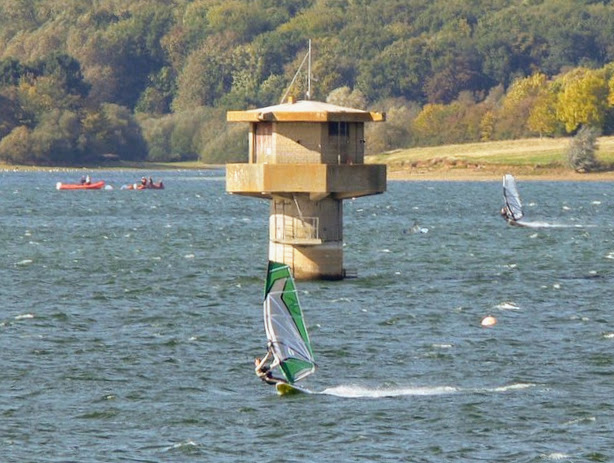
Limnological tower at Rutland Water

A limnological tower is a structure constructed in a body of water to facilitate the study of aquatic ecosystems (limnology). They play an important role in drinking water infrastructure by allowing the prediction of algal blooms which can block filters and affect the taste of the water.

== Purpose ==
Limnological towers provide a fixed structure to which sensors and sampling devices can be affixed. The depth of the structure below water level allows for study of the various layers of water in the lake or reservoir. The management of limnological conditions can be important in reservoirs used to supply drinking water treatment plants. In certain conditions algal blooms can occur which can block filters, change the pH of the water and cause taste and odour problems. If the sensors extend to the bed level the tower can also be used to monitor the hypolimnion (lowest layer of water) which in some conditions can become anoxic (of low oxygen content) which may affect the lake ecology.

Limnological towers have been constructed in reservoirs used to supply drinking water in the United Kingdom since algal blooms began causing problems with water quality. By providing data on water conditions and algae levels the towers can predict the behaviour of the algae and allow managers to make decisions to alter conditions to prevent algal blooms. These decisions may include altering water inflows (particularly where nutrient-rich intakes are considered), activating water jets to promote the mixing of different layers of water and altering the depth from which water is abstracted. These decisions can affect the behaviour of the reservoir over a period from a few hours to a few years.

== Examples ==
=== North America ===
Six combined limnological and meteorological observation towers were established in the Great Lakes on the US-Canadian border in 1961. Three were installed in Lake Huron, two in Lake Ontario and one in Lake Erie by the Great Lakes Institute. These were innovative in design and cheap to construct, being built largely from 4-inch (100 mm) water pipe. Constructed in water depths of 7–63 metres (23–207 ft) the towers provided measurements of wind speed, air temperature and rainfall as well as water temperature and current flows at different depth. The shorter towers (in water less than 60 feet (18 m) of depth) were attached directly to the bed, towers in greater depths of water were floating units, with a submerged ballast tank, that were anchored to the lake bed by means of cables and weights.

A further two limnological towers were constructed near Douglas Point in Lake Huron in the 1960s. One, 24 metres (79 ft) high was built 4 kilometres (2.5 mi) offshore in 1961 and a second 47 metres (154 ft) high in 1969. They are poles anchored to the lake bed by means of a gimbal and braced by tensioned cables and anchor guys. They featured a mobile thermistor sensor that could be moved to any depth on the tower as well as fixed thermometers at various depths and were intended to monitor the temperatures of different water layers in the lake.

=== United Kingdom ===
A concrete limnological tower was installed at Rutland Water, England's largest reservoir by surface area, when it was built in the early 1970s. The design of the tower was influenced by consultation with the Water Research Centre and was intended to provide the best possible tools to monitor the ecological conditions of the reservoir so that it could be best managed by its operator (the Anglian Water Authority). The tower monitors water temperature, dissolved oxygen levels and water fluorescence (which is a measure of algal content) at 2m depth intervals. The tower also has the ability to draw water samples for further testing from the various depths and also mounts an automatic weather station. The data is continuous and displayed visually in real-time at the reservoir control centre, situated at the dam. The site of the tower was chosen to best suit the needs of the operator. The reservoir consists of two arms – northern and southern – and has been designed such that all nutrient-rich water enters the southern arm. The intention being that nutrients will be depleted before the water is abstracted for use at the eastern end of the site. The northern-arm is fed by nutrient-poor sources and should be relatively unaffected by algal blooms. A secondary outlet is available that draws solely from the northern arm, in cases that the southern arm is affected by algal growth. Additionally the operators are able to draw directly from the River Nene if the reservoir water is unusable.

The Queen Mother Reservoir near London also has a limnological tower.
