= Ashford, Surrey =

Town in Surrey, England

Coordinates: 51.434°N 0.464°W

Ashford
- Cattle in fog on Shortwood Common

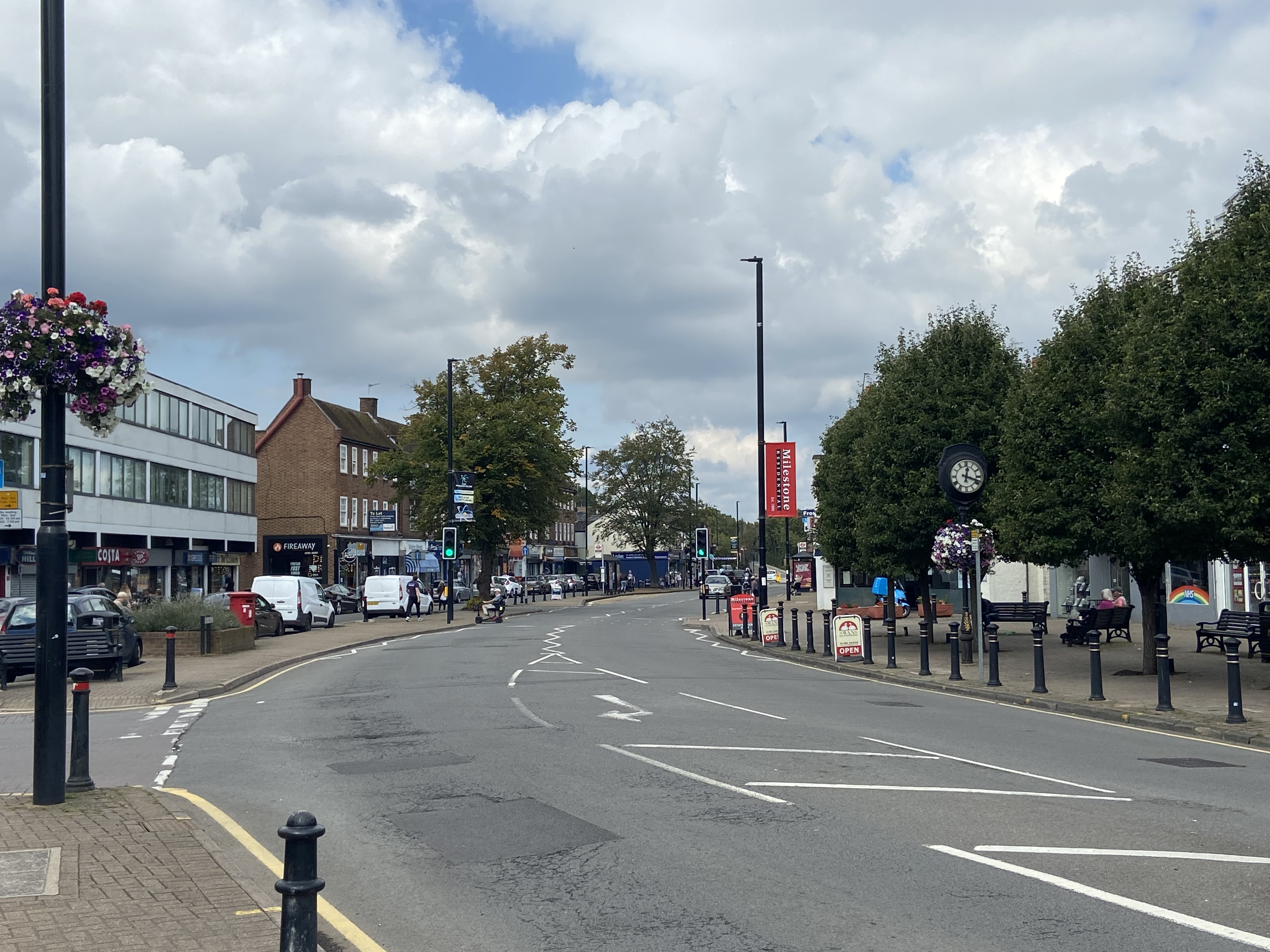
- Church Road, Ashford's high street. The town clock installed in 2011 is on the right.

- Location within Surrey
- Area: 6.71 km^{2} (2.59 sq mi)
- Population: 27,382 (2011 census)
  - Density: 4,081/km^{2} (10,570/sq mi)
- OS grid reference: TQ065715
- Civil parish: n/a
- District: Spelthorne
- Shire county: Surrey
- Region: South East
- Country: England
- Sovereign state: United Kingdom
- Post town: Ashford
- Postcode district: TW15
- Dialling code: 01784
- Police: Surrey
- Fire: Surrey
- Ambulance: South East Coast
- UK Parliament: Spelthorne

Ashford is a town in the Borough of Spelthorne in Surrey, England, which lies 14 mi (23 km) west of central London. Its name derives from a ford of the River Ash, a distributary of the River Colne. Historically part of Middlesex, the town has been part of Surrey since 1965. In 2011 it had a population of 27,382.

Though ceremonially part of Surrey, residents of the town along with the borough of Spelthorne as a whole still hold a strong Middlesex identity, including participation in Middlesex Day celebrations on the 16th of May.

Ashford railway station, on the Waterloo–Reading line, is served by South Western Railway. Heathrow Airport is 2.5 mi (4 km) north of the town.

HMP Bronzefield and one of the sites of Brooklands College are in the town. Ashford Hospital, which began as a workhouse, is to the north of the town centre, in neighbouring Stanwell. Ashford Common has a parade of shops and is a more residential ward that includes part of Queen Mary Reservoir and all of its related water treatment works. The town is surrounded by areas of green space including The Princes Club, Bedfont Lakes and Shortwood Common.

== Topography ==
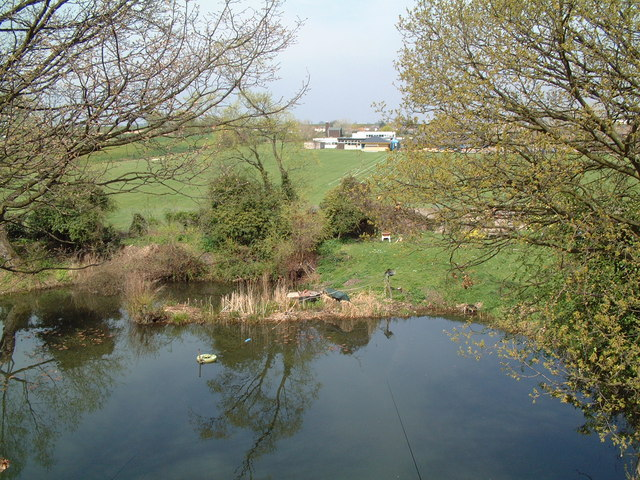
Part of Ashford Park, looking towards Ashford Park Primary School

Ashford is in the almost flat alluvial plain formed by the historic courses of the River Thames on fairly fertile but gravelly soil in centuries past covered by deciduous forest for wood gathering, with clearings of meadow for pasture and to a lesser extent arable farming to supply the London market; sheep grazing continues today around the reservoirs. In common with areas bordering the west of Greater London, gravel commences often within a metre of the surface which has led to 20th-century gravel extraction, (Note: Page wrote in 1911: There are 1,401½ acres in the parish, and of these 495¼ acres are arable, and 398¼ acres are grass. The principal crops are oats, wheat, barley, turnips, and peas. The soil is gravelly, and the subsoil gravel.) which has formed the lakes to the north of the railway line, mostly in East Bedfont . The extreme west is Shortwood Common, partly converted to a recreation ground, Ashford Park Primary School, Hengrove Quarry and Staines Cemetery.

North of this is the pair of Staines Reservoirs, the other green buffer is The Princes Club, Bedfont Lakes, spanning the northeast border; these areas constitute Metropolitan Green Belt buffers to the country's largest city. The area includes postally much of Queen Mary Reservoir (which covered most of the parish to the south of Littleton and almost none of historic Ashford) named after Mary of Teck, the wife of George V.

Most of the land is devoted to suburban and low-rise urban housing – as well as recreational areas. Green spaces in the town are remnants of Ashford Common which give the eastern part of the town a reminder of its past status as a grazing common; these include recreation grounds such as Thames Water-sponsored Spelthorne Sports Club and the BP recreation ground.

In The Clumps, 37 houses in the Ashford post town, which has the postcode TW15, are in the London Borough of Hounslow, Greater London, alongside the Princes Club watersports lakes partly in Ashford post town but mostly in East Bedfont, Feltham post town, London. The other road with this status is the western half of Challenge Road, which has only business addresses.

== History ==
Bronze Age artefacts have been found in Ashford (at 51.432708N, 0.485174W) giving rise to the name Bronzefield and a henge may have been present in that period. Ashford appears on the Middlesex Domesday map as Exeforde, held by Robert, Count of Mortain. Its Domesday assets were: 1 plough, meadow for 1 plough; a separate manor in 1066, it was part of the manor of Kempton in 1086. It rendered (in total) 14s 0d. Throughout the early medieval period the place was also referred to as Echelford.

A stone bridge was built over the ford in 1789 by the Hampton and Staines Turnpike Trust

Ashford Common was a large area of common land in the south and east of the town that the British Army used for military displays in the reign of George III. It was inclosed in 1809.

Ashford Manor Golf Club was established in 1902 at the property which was the Manor Farm House but the large manorial estate and manor house that were held by Solomon Abraham Hart from 1870 to 1882 (Note: who died in 1887 aged in the Holborn district of London (General Register Office ref: 1b 538)) had before 1902 been broken up among many small owners, and all trace of the manor house was lost. The title of Lord of the manor was acquired by Scott Freeman in 1890, and after passing to another partner of the solicitors Horne, Engall & Freeman the title passed in more recent times to Russell Grant.

Ashford's housing stock is chiefly a mixture of detached and semi-detached housing built between 1885 and 1960. (Note: William Page stated The aspect of the whole parish is rapidly changing. Until a few years ago it was almost completely rural in Page, William, ed. (1911). "Spelthorne Hundred: Ashford". A History of the County of Middlesex. Victoria County History. Vol. II. Westminster: Archibald Constable & Co. pp. 306–309.)

=== Former schools ===
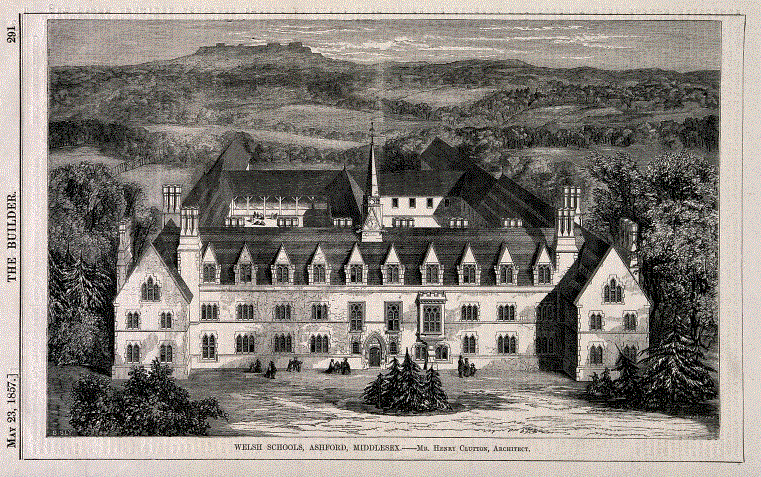
The Welsh School when new in 1857

The Welsh School (later St David's School) was founded in 1857. Its building north of Ashford railway station is Gothic Revival, designed by Henry Clutton. St David's School is now defunct, but in 2010 its buildings and playing fields became the premises of St James Senior Boys School.

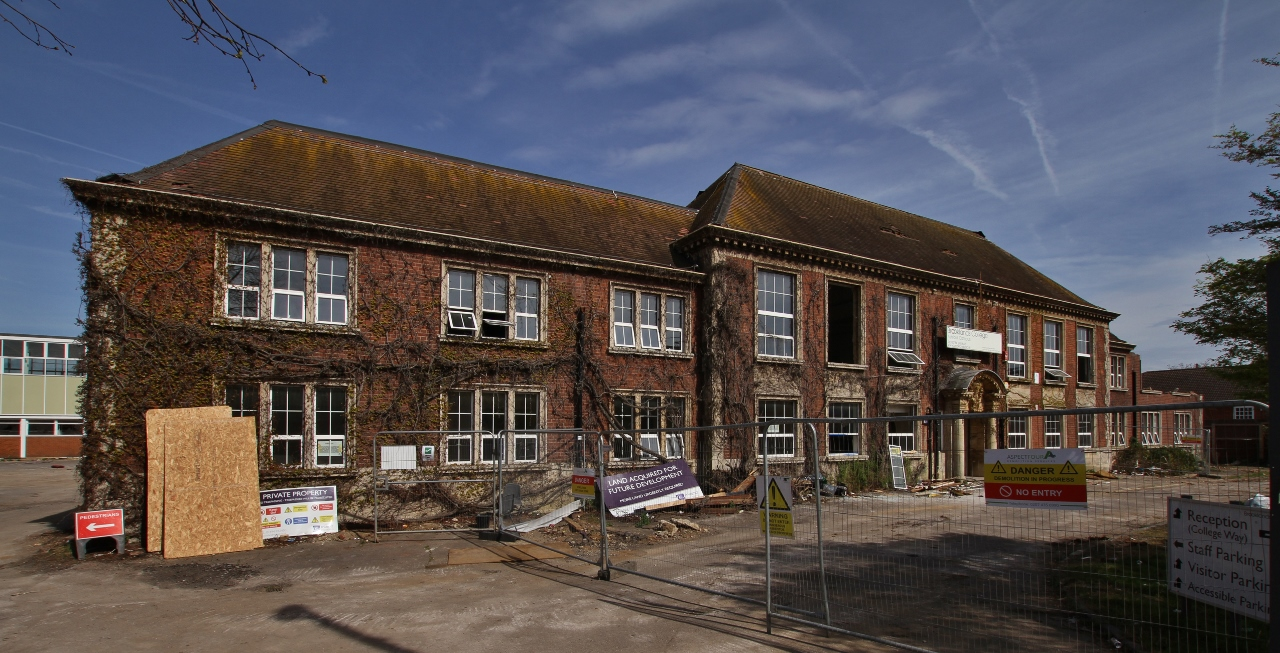
The former Ashford County Grammar School after Inland Homes plc tried to demolish it

Ashford County Grammar School was founded in 1911. It became Ashford Sixth Form College in 1975 and Spelthorne College later. In 2007 it merged with Brooklands College. A property developer, Inland Homes plc, has since acquired the former grammar school buildings in Church Road. In 2017 it started to demolish the buildings without planning permission. The developer stopped the work at the request of Spelthorne Borough Council after demolition had started, but later continued the demolition, having received planning permission to build 357 new homes on the site.

=== Civic administration ===
Coat of Arms of the Borough of Spelthorne

In 1894, under the Local Government Act 1894, Ashford became part of the Staines Rural District of Middlesex. In 1930 the rural district was abolished and joined Staines Urban District. In 1965, under the London Government Act 1963, Middlesex County Council was abolished and the urban district was transferred to the Lieutenancy of Surrey and Surrey County Council. In 1974, under the Local Government Act 1972, Staines Urban District was abolished and its area combined with that of Sunbury-on-Thames Urban District to create the present borough of Spelthorne.

In 1931 the civil parish had a population of 16,502. On 1 April 1974 the parish was abolished.

Branding of the new West Surrey & South Middlesex Council

In 2027, the Borough of Spelthorne will be abolished and all areas held will be transferred to the new West Surrey & South Middlesex council.

== Churches ==
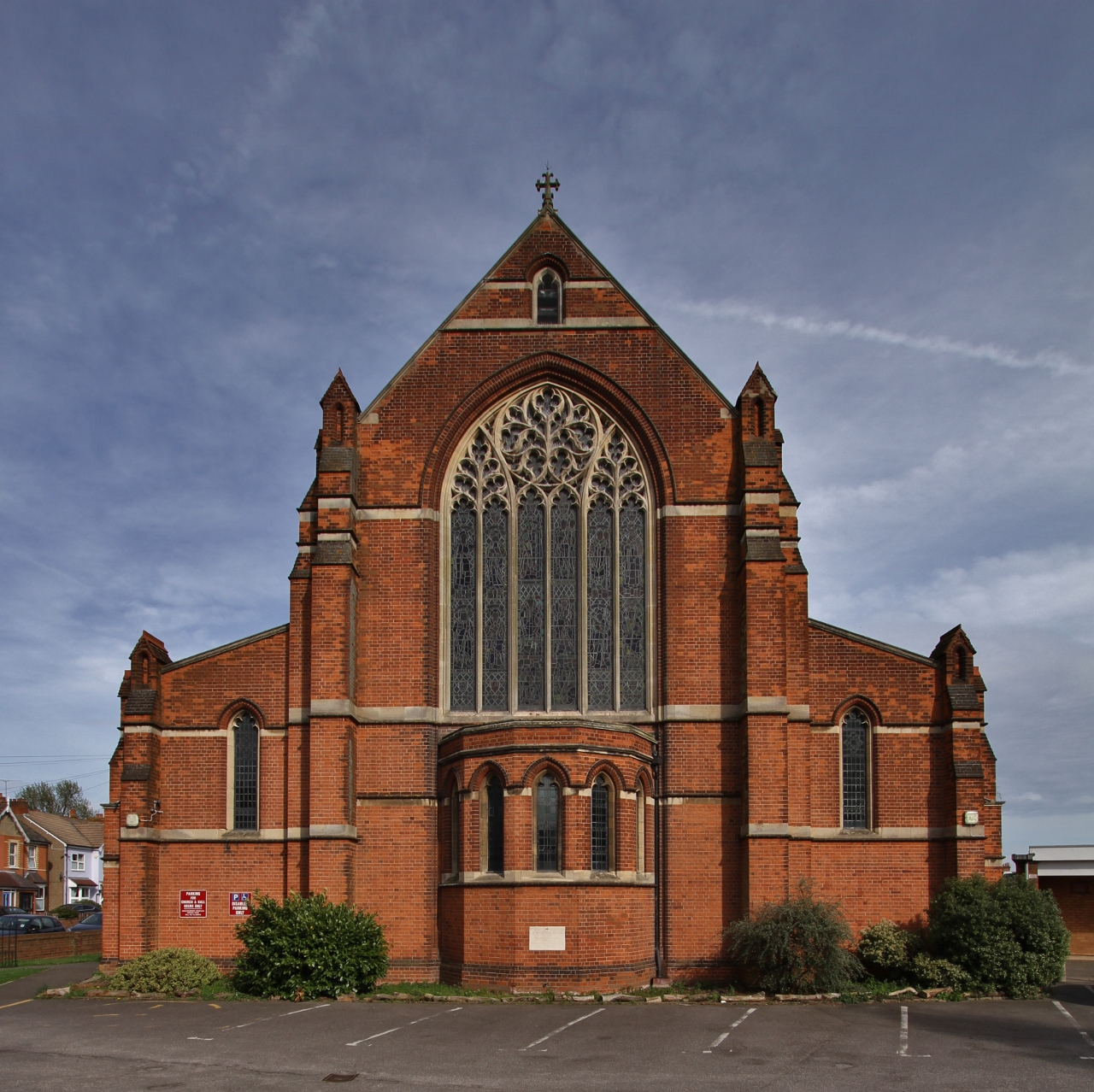
St Hilda's Church of England parish church

The present Church of England parish church of St Matthew in Church Road was built in 1856–58 with financial help from the Welsh School. It was sited some yards west of Ashford's earlier parish church of St Michael, parts of which were Norman. St Michael's was demolished, but internal monuments and a 12th-century arch from it were incorporated into St Matthew's. William Butterfield designed St Matthew's in a Gothic Revival style. The tower was not completed until 1865.

St Hilda's parish church at the junction of Stanwell and Woodthorpe Roads was founded as a daughter church of St Matthew's to serve the rapidly expanding community around the railway station. Construction started in 1912 and most of the church was built in the first few years, but the chancel and some other parts were not completed until 1928. St Hilda's original design included a spire that would have been one of the most significant landmarks in the area, but it was never built. St Hilda's was initially a conventual district of St Matthew's parish, but is now a separate ecclesiastical parish. The easternmost parts of Ashford Common are in the parish of St Saviour's, Sunbury.

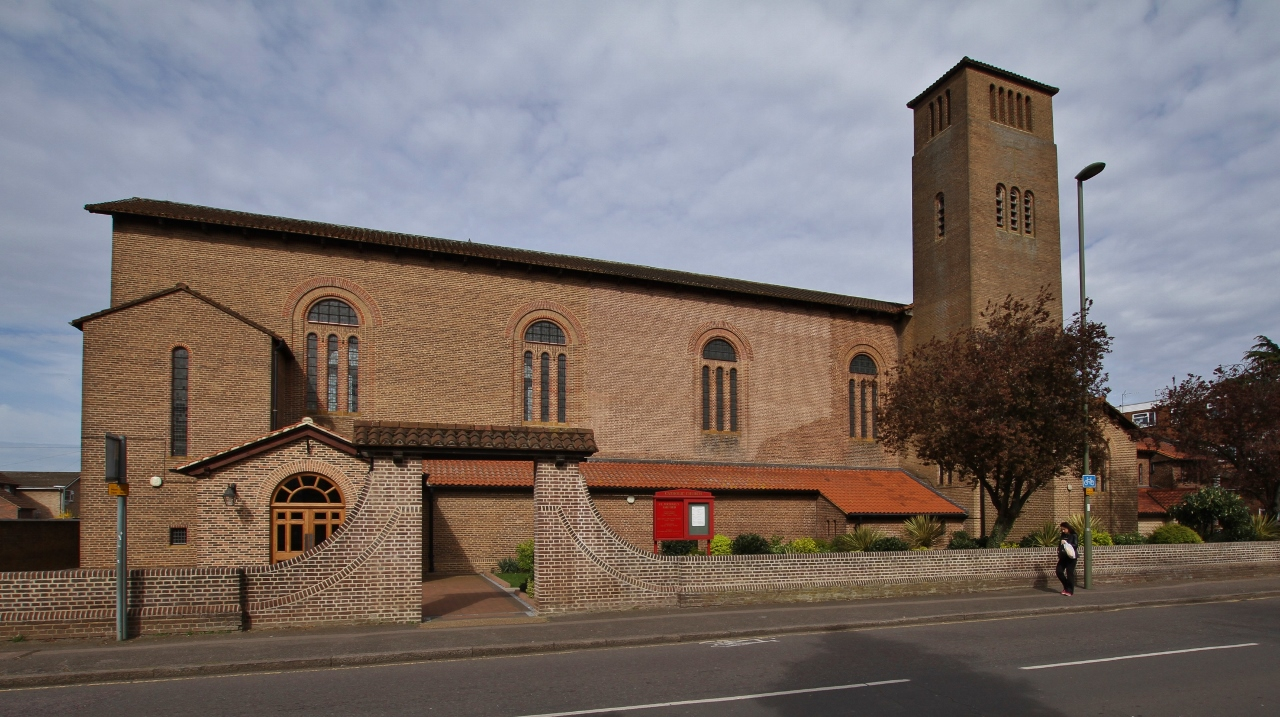
St Michael's Roman Catholic church

The Roman Catholic Church of St Michael in Fordbridge Road was begun in 1927 and the uncompleted building was consecrated in 1928. It was designed by Sir Giles Gilbert Scott in a Romanesque Revival style. Building continued in 1938, but the tower was not completed until 1960.

Ashford has two Methodist churches: one on Clarendon Road and the other in Ashford Common on Feltham hill Road.

There is a Congregational church in Clarendon Road.

The Salvation Army has a citadel in Woodthorpe Road.

== Economy ==
The main street, Church Road, has local businesses, including Co-op, Tesco Express, Costa Coffee, Sainsbury's, several estate agents, three funeral directors, and several places to eat. Church Road is also home to Ashford Library and a prominent World War I memorial.

The town boasts five pubs: The King's Head, The King's Fairway, The Freeman Arms, The District Arms, and The Bull Dog.

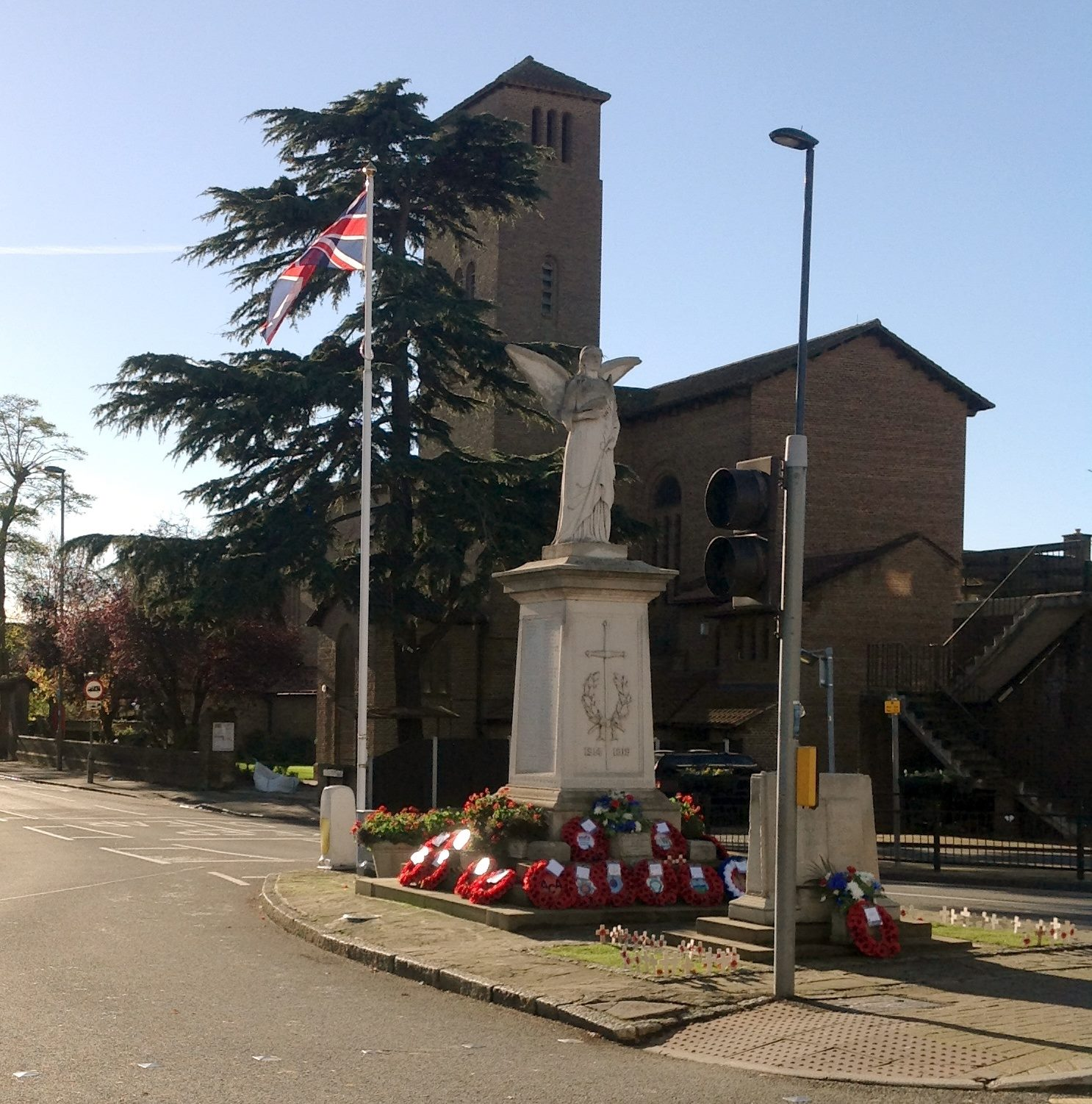
War memorial on Church Road with St Michael's church in the background

Ashford, in common with most of neighbouring London suburbia, has very low unemployment rates. A great deal of local employment is directly related to Heathrow Airport. BP International is another major employer. Many other residents work in London or in the Thames Valley.

The town previously had multiple high street banks including Barclays, HSBC, Lloyds and Santander, however all of these have since closed, and only a Natwest on Woodthorpe Road remains. The Barclays branch located on Church Road was the site of an attempted robbery in June 2010, when a man armed with an imitation gun and a fake bomb took multiple hostages, demanding £800,000 and a helicopter. All of the hostages were either released or escaped before the perpetrator surrendered to police.

== Transport ==
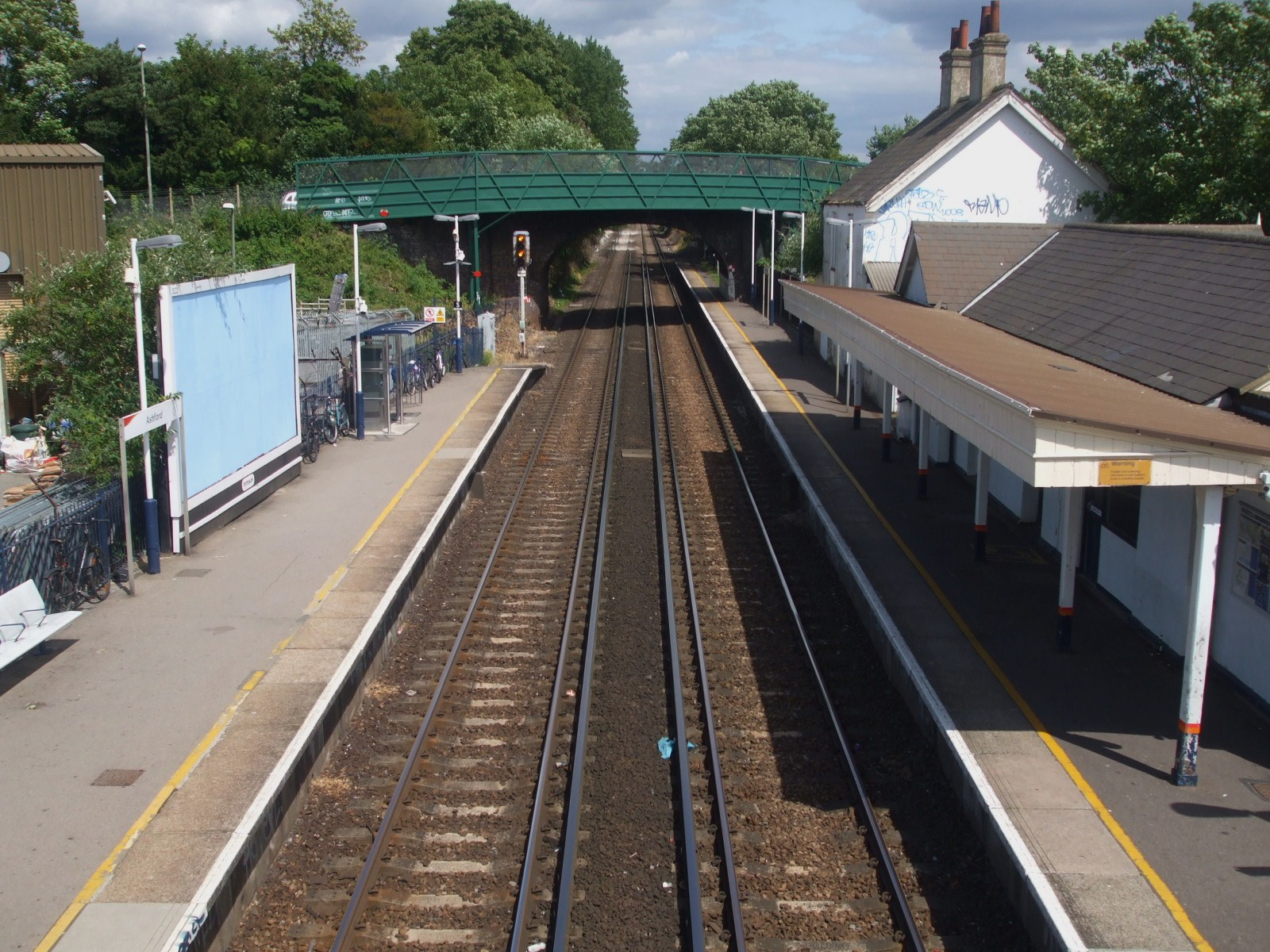
Ashford railway station

Ashford is on the Waterloo–Reading line, with South Western Railway stopping services from London Waterloo on two of its three routes, those to Windsor & Eton Riverside and to Weybridge on the South West Main Line via the Chertsey Line. The station is referred to in timetables as Ashford (Surrey) in order to avoid confusion with Ashford International station in Kent.

Not far north of the station is the A30 dual carriageway, which marks much of Ashford's northern border. It follows the old route from London to Devon and Cornwall. The alignment of this road is WSW–ENE.

A straight relief road, roughly WNW–ESE, was built by the Hampton and Staines Turnpike Trust. Now the A308, it has become a dual carriageway from Sunbury Cross to the junction with the A30 at Staines. This road marks some of the town's southern border. Ashford is close to the M25, M3 and A3 roads.

The town is on Hallmark Connections route 555 from Heathrow Airport to Walton-on-Thames, on three Transport for London routes, the 117, 216 and 290, also serving Isleworth, Kingston upon Thames and Twickenham respectively, and more occasional routes, including special school services run by other operators.

== Education ==
View of Ashford Park Primary School Fireworks from Hengrove Quarry

=== Primary schools ===
- St Michael's Roman Catholic Primary School (4th best on benchmark of English and mathematics in the county)
- Ashford Church of England Primary School
- Echelford Primary School
- Ashford Park Primary School
- Clarendon primary school

=== Secondary schools ===
- Thomas Knyvett College
- St James Senior Boys School, private and selective

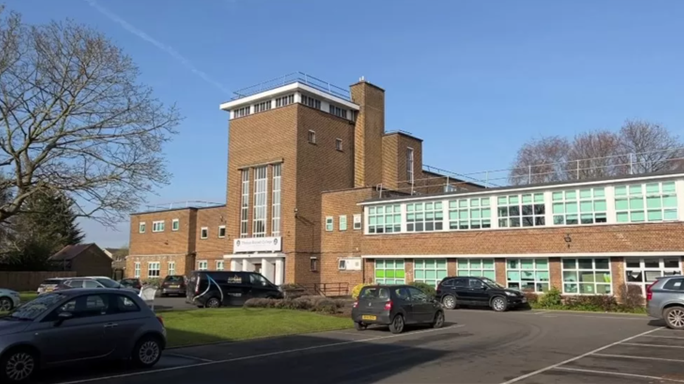
Thomas Knyvett College, the secondary school for the majority of children aged 11-16 in the town

=== Further education ===
Ashford's further education college, Spelthorne College, became a Brooklands College Campus in 2007. In 2016 the Ashford Campus relocated to a new building adjacent to Thomas Knyvett College, and the former Spelthorne College site was demolished. It serves 16 to 18 year olds from a wide area of Middlesex.

== Sport ==
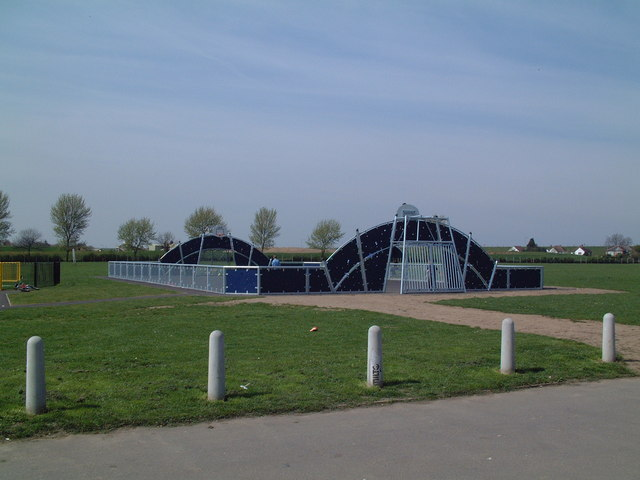
A football pitch in Hengrove Park

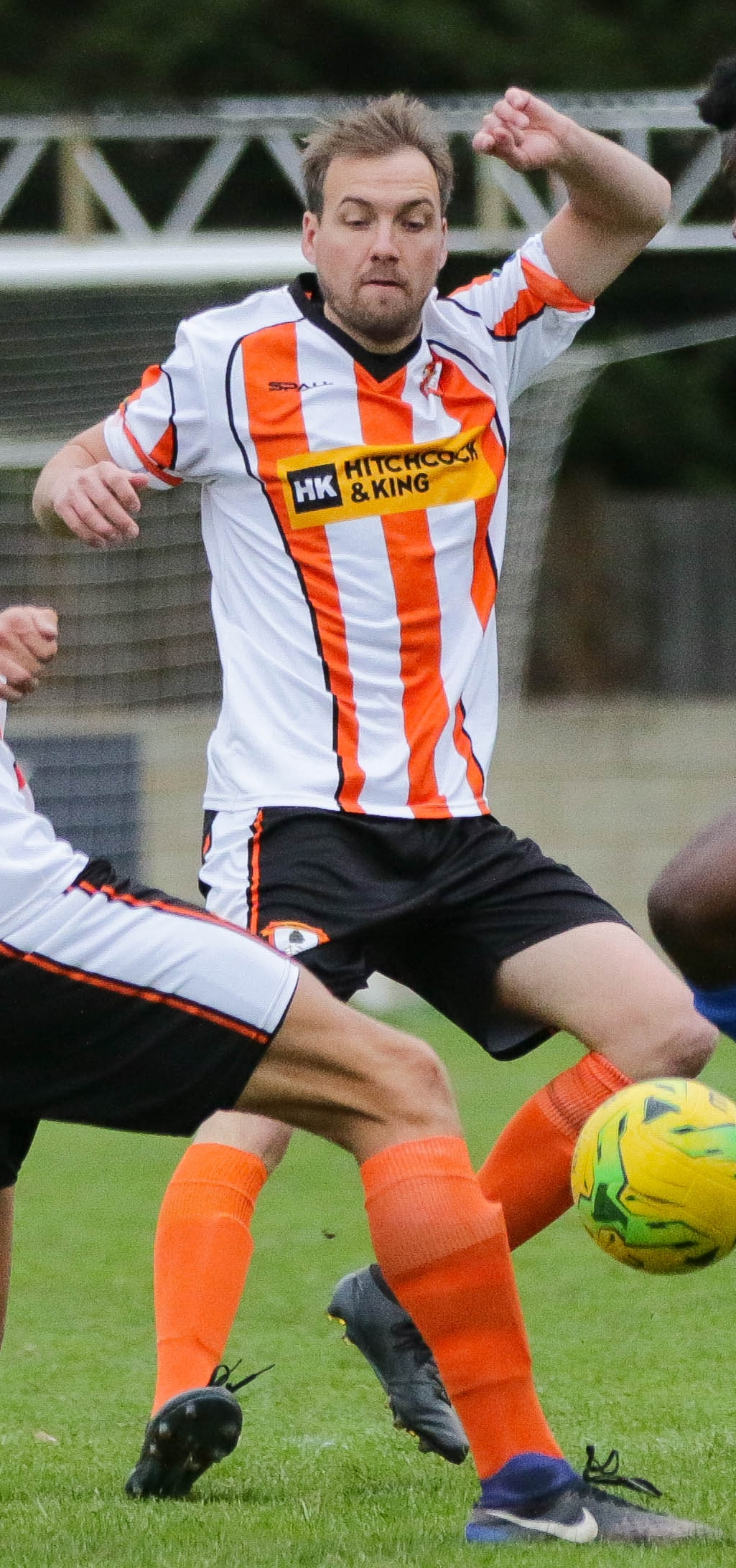
Footballer for Ashford Town in 2018

Sports clubs in and representing Ashford include:

- Ashford Town F.C. (in neighboring Stanwell)
- Spelthorne Sports F.C.
- Ashford Cricket Club (also in Stanwell).
- Ashford Tennis Club
- Ashford (Middlesex) Bowls Club
- Spelthorne Atoms Youth Basketball Team (formerly Ashford Atoms)
- Ashford Manor Golf Club

Clubs also exist for hockey, aikido, karate, acrobatic gymnastics and sailing.

Ashford Manor Golf Club has 18 holes. In 1921, the golf course was the site of the murder of British spy Vincent Fovargue by the IRA.

== Watercourses ==
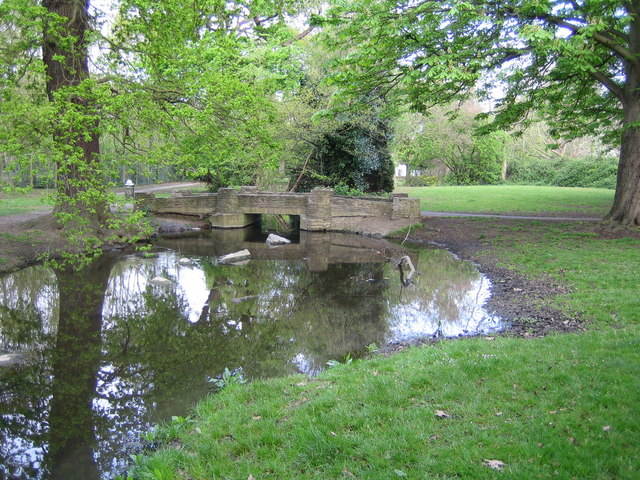
River Ash in Fordbridge Park

Ashford has one river, the River Ash, one of the six distributaries of the River Colne which runs in line with the Staines bypass under the Fordbridge roundabout at the far end of Fordbridge Road, its upper reach being the traditional border with Staines and then entering Laleham, passing close to the other side of the Queen Mary Reservoir.

The Staines Reservoirs aqueduct (built 1902) flows from west to east across Ashford. It carries water from the Staines Reservoirs and King George VI Reservoir to Hampton water treatment works via Sunbury and Kempton Park.

== Governance ==
Ashford is part of the Spelthorne parliamentary constituency which was represented by the Conservative Kwasi Kwarteng from 2010 to 2024. After stepping down, Kwarteng was replaced by Conservative MP Lincoln Jopp.

For elections to Surrey County Council, four electoral divisions cover Ashford in whole or in part: Ashford, Staines South and Ashford West, Sunbury Common and Ashford Common, and Stanwell and Stanwell Moor. Each elects one member of the council.

For Spelthorne Borough Council, headquartered in Knowle Green, Staines-upon-Thames, three councillors are elected from each of four wards: Ashford Town, Ashford East, Ashford Common, and Ashford North and Stanwell South.

== Demography and housing ==
2011 census homes
Output area	Detached	Semi-detached	Terraced	Flats and apartments	Caravans/temporary/mobile homes	Shared between households
Spelthorne 3,5 and 6	2,388	4,380	1,672	2,618	7	0

The average level of accommodation in the region composed of detached houses was 28%, the average that was apartments was 22.6%.

Output area	Population	Households	% Owned outright	% Owned with a loan	hectares
Spelthorne 3, 5 and 6	27,382	11,065	29.0%	33.9%	671

The proportion of households in the settlement who owned their home outright compares to the regional average of 35.1%. The proportion who owned their home with a loan compares to the regional average of 32.5%. The remaining % is made up of rented dwellings (plus a negligible % of households living rent-free).

== Notable people ==
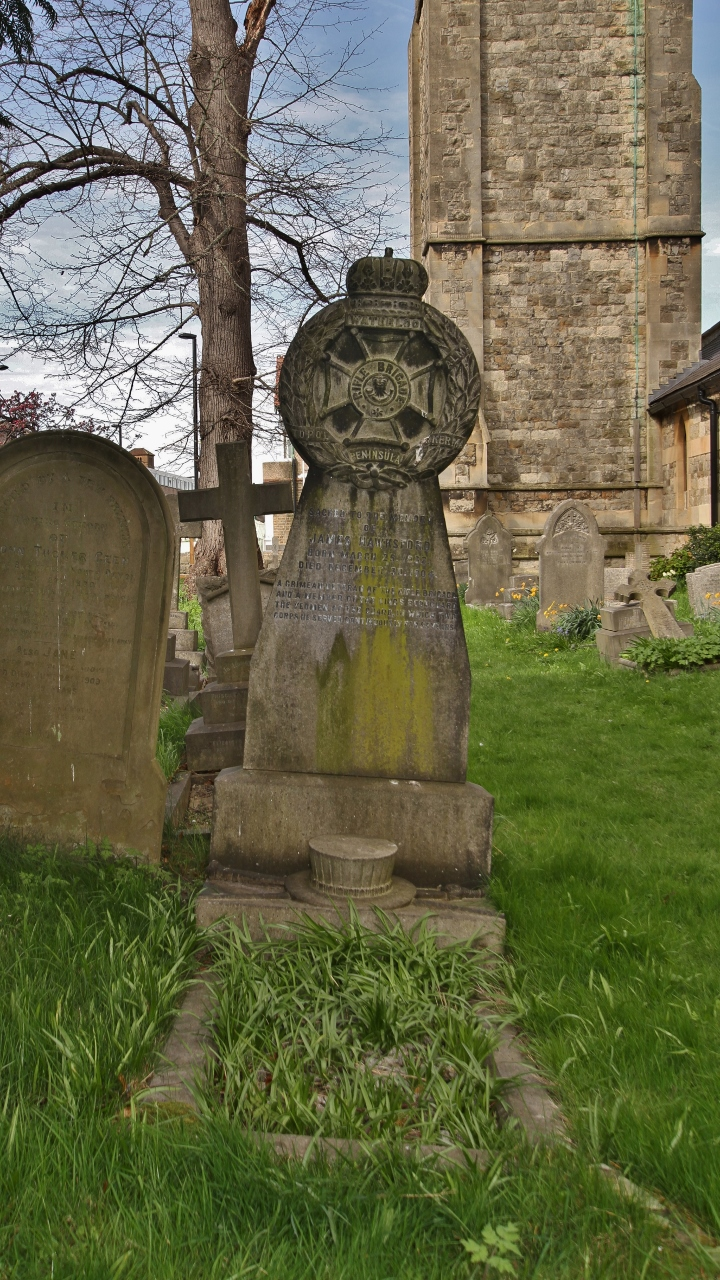
Grave in St Matthew's parish churchyard of James Hawksford (1832–1904), who served 53 years in the British Army. The inscription on his headstone says he was in the Rifle Brigade, served in the Crimean War, and later transferred to the Yeomen of the Guard.

- Sarah Ayton, Olympic gold medallist in the Yngling sailing class, 2004 and 2008
- Nicholas Bond-Owen, child actor in George and Mildred
- Anthony Burgess, novelist and Lord of Ashford, 1973–75
- Christopher Coleman, cricketer
- Bobby Davro, born Robert Nankeville, TV impressionist and actor
- Ray Dorset, singer-songwriter with Mungo Jerry
- Robert Evans, politician, Labour MEP 1994–2009
- Russell Grant, astrologer and stage actor, bought the title of Lord of the manor of Ashford in 1996
- Roger Johnson, footballer
- James Lincoln, cricketer
- Scott Rendell, footballer currently playing for League Two team Wycombe Wanderers
- Toby Roland-Jones, England cricketer
- Greg Searle, Gold medallist in the coxless fours in rowing, 1992 Summer Olympics, two other Olympic medals, 1993 Coxed Pairs world champion
- Spelbound, acrobatic group, 2010 Britain's Got Talent winners
- Anthony Watson, England rugby union player
- Sarah Webb, Olympic gold medallist in the Yngling sailing class, 2004 and 2008
- Norman Willis, General Secretary of the Trades Union Congress (TUC) 1984–92 and president of the European Trade Union Confederation 1991–93
- Ruth Wilson, Actress, Golden Globe winning actress for The Affair and two time Laurence Olivier Award winner.
- Phil Younghusband, footballer, all-time high scorer for the Philippines national football team
