= Thomas Knyvett College =

Coordinates: 51.440°N 0.471°W

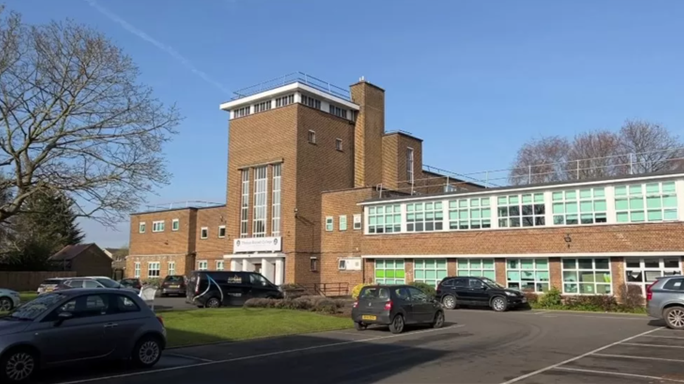

Location
- Stanwell Road; Ashford, TW15 3DU; England

Information
- Type: Secondary Academy Converter
- Motto: Bringing out the Best
- Founder: Surrey County Council
- Local authority: Borough of Spelthorne
- Department for Education URN: 136832 Tables
- Ofsted: Reports
- Chairman of Governors: Tina Crombie
- Headmaster: Matt Duffield
- Staff: 35 teaching, 17 support (as of 2016)
- Gender: Mixed
- Age: 11 to 16
- Enrolment: 1120 as of January 2016
- Houses: Nightingale, Farah, Elizabeth, Attenbourough
- Colour: Black
- Current admissions policy: Comprehensive
- Executive Headteacher: N/A
- Website: www.thomasknyvett.org

Thomas Knyvett College (/ˈnɪvɪt/) is a medium sized mixed school with Academy Converter status (conversion to an Academy is underway during the 2014–2015 academic year) educating students aged 11–16 in Ashford, Surrey, England. The college is part of the Howard Schools Trust which includes the Howard of Effingham School in Effingham in the county, the schools within which are supported by an Executive Headteacher, the prototype arrangement of its kind in the United Kingdom.

== History ==
The seventeenth century politician, Thomas Knyvet, 1st Baron Knyvet (1545–1622) was granted the manor of Stanwell in 1603. On his death in 1622 he left provision for the founding of a school in Stanwell.

The present school site consists of a complex of buildings mostly completed just before the outbreak of World War Two in 1939. From January 1947 the school was known as Stanwell Road Secondary Modern school, which was split between a boys' school and a girls' school. In 1958 it was renamed to Abbotsford School, combining the "Abbot" of Westminster Abbey with the "ford" of the River Ash, from which the town of Ashford also derives its name. In 1975 it became a co-educational comprehensive school, with a total of 1,140 students. In 1987 it merged with The Stanwell School (also known as Stanwell Secondary School) to become Ashford High School. The Stanwell School site, located on Short Lane in Stanwell, was demolished despite its relatively short 17 years of operation.

In March 2004 Ashford High School gained technology specialist college status, and in September 2004 was renamed the Ash Technology College. In 2005 it achieved Investors in People (IIP) status, however a school inspection published 20 May 2005 recommended placing the school into special measures under the School Inspections Act 1996 after finding the college's effectiveness to be "unsatisfactory". In 2006 the school was de-designated from its technology status, and on 1 September 2007 it adopted the name Thomas Knyvett College.

== Funding ==
A non-fee paying school, Thomas Knyvett College's funding is received predominantly via pro rata Surrey County Council annual allocation. Since 2009 the secondary education provider has been eligible for the Howard of Effingham Trust Fund and related donations, Charities Commission registered, funds which are raised by parents across the region and fundraising. Funds are enhanced by successful registration or selection for pupil premiums and grants restricted to central and local government-funded schools. Free school meals eligibility: 22.4% (band: mid).

== Attributes ==
In the house system, each of the three houses which compete are divided into forms for many years. The resultant tutor forms provide a pastoral, advice point across all activities.

The proportion of students known to be eligible for the pupil premium funding (additional government funding for children in the care of the local authority, students known to be eligible for free school meals and those from service families) is slightly greater than average, standing for the financial year 2014-15 at £194,175. The proportion of disabled students and those with special educational needs who are supported at school action is above the national average. The proportion supported at school action plus or with a statement of special educational needs is below the national average.

=== Facilities ===
The main facilities are:

- Astroturf sports fields
- Sports fields and field sports athletics grounds
- Main Hall
- Dining Hall
- Sports Hall
- Sports Gym
- Tennis Courts
- Classrooms
- ICT Suites
- Library
- Cookery Classrooms
- Resistant Materials Classroom
- Music Practice Rooms
- Drama Studio

== Ofsted ==
The Ofsted inspection of December 2019 gave the school an overall Good, on the four-point scale (Outstanding/Good/Satisfactory/Inadequate). Omitting praised examples, the headline assessment of teaching was:

"Some teaching is good or better. Where this is the case, lessons are thoughtfully planned with lesson organisation that supports students’ learning very effectively. Teachers begin lessons with imaginative activities which fire the enthusiasm of students.

In the best lessons, teachers create opportunities for students to work creatively and solve problems together...Such exciting ways of learning are not yet common enough across the college.

Students very quickly develop good skills in reading and writing because teachers focus on this in all subjects. This helps them to do better in all subjects as they move up through the college.

Inspectors saw examples of some well-directed questioning which makes students think more deeply about ideas and helps them progress more quickly. In mathematics, teachers are precise in their questioning and feedback which ensures that students understand exactly how to improve.

In mathematics, teachers are precise in their questioning and feedback which ensures that students understand exactly

how to improve. In English teachers us a systematic approach successfully, to teaching basic skills and examination techniques"

— School Report: Thomas Knyvett College, Page 5. December 2013, Ofsted: Anwar, Taylor-Bennett and Young (Senior Inspector and Assistant Inspectors)

== Violent incident 2023 ==
In February 2023 a video was widely circulated online showing several white girls violently attacking a black girl outside the school while being urged on by an adult woman. Several bystanders were watching the child being violently assaulted, but did not intervene. The police subsequently made several arrests describing the matter as a "serious racially aggravated assault". A protest was held at the school the next day with participants calling for an investigation and justice for the girl. The protests were led by anti-racism group Forever Family. Several Members of Parliament across parties weighed in, through a letter penned by Janet Daby, which called for a full investigation. British rapper, Dave, and others also called for the firing of teachers.
