= Buckland (surname) =

Buckland is an English surname. Notable people with the surname include:

- Andrew Buckland (playwright) (born 4 February 1954), South African playwright, performer and academic.
- Anne Walbank Buckland (1832–1899), English anthropologist, travel writer and author
- Caleb Henry Buckland, Canadian politician
- Francis Trevelyan Buckland (1826–1880), English surgeon, zoologist and natural historian
- Frank Buckland (ice hockey) (1902–1991), Canadian sports administrator
- Frank Buckland (politician) (1847–1915), New Zealand MP
- Herbert Tudor Buckland (1869–1951), British architect
- James Buckland (born 1981), English rugby union player
- Jessie Buckland (1878–1939), New Zealand photographer
- John Buckland (New Zealand politician) (1844–1909), New Zealand politician
- Jonny Buckland (born 1977), British guitarist and musician of Coldplay
- Kira Buckland (born 1987), American voice actress
- Matthew Buckland (1974–2019), South African Internet entrepreneur
- Michael Buckland (born 1941), emeritus Professor at the UC Berkeley School of Information
- Raymond Buckland (1934–2017), English-born American author
- Robert Buckland (born 1968), British Conservative Party politician, MP politician and Lord Chancellor
- Seymour Berry, 1st Baron Buckland (1877–1928), Welsh financier and industrialist
- Stéphan Buckland (born 1977), Mauritian 200 m sprinter
- Toby Buckland (born 1969), English gardener, TV presenter and author
- William Buckland, D.D., F.R.S. (1784–1856), English theologian, geologist and palaeontologist
- William Buckland (architect) (1734–1774), American architect
- William Thomas Buckland (1798–1870), English surveyor and auctioneer
- William Buckland (politician) (died 1876), New Zealand politician
- William Warwick Buckland (1859–1946), Roman Law scholar
- Yve Buckland (born 1956), British public health administrator
