= Amatomu =

Blog search engine and article aggregator

Amatomu was a blog search engine and article aggregator, focusing on blogs published in South Africa. It was founded by local web entrepreneurs Matthew Buckland and Vincent Maher in March 2007, while working for one of the country's largest news websites, the Mail & Guardian Online.

According to an article in Finweek, the site was still in its early testing phase with a select group of users when someone not in the test group leaked news about it and it was deluged with bloggers looking to use the service.

The site ranked bloggers and provided charts and statistics for their blogs. It also had the ability to track trends and monitor keywords in the local blogosphere via buzzgraphs.

Amatomu organized bloggers by topic and listed blog keywords.

== See also ==
- Regator
- BlogScope
- IceRocket
- Sphere
- Technorati
- List of search engines
