= Silicon Cape Initiative =

Regional ICT business networking NPO

- Founded: October 8, 2009
- Founder: Vinny Lingham; Justin Stanford
- Type: Business Network
- Purpose: Business networking, venture capital, IT start-up companies
- Location: Cape Town
- Region served: Western Cape, South Africa
- Method: Public and government engagement
- Members: c. 7029
- Owner: Community Owned
- Website: www.siliconcape.com
- Formerly called: N/A

The Cape Silicon Initiative or Silicon Cape is a regional ICT business networking NPO and community in the Western Cape, South Africa.

== Background and launch ==
The Silicon Cape Initiative is a private sector community movement that was founded by two South African high-tech entrepreneurs, Vinny Lingham and Justin Stanford. Both being entrepreneurs and angel investors in the information and communication technologies start-up sector in South Africa, they observed the unique confluence of circumstances emerging in their home country and in particular in the province of the Western Cape. The name Silicon Cape is based on the technological hub Silicon Valley in the United States San Francisco Bay Area. Whilst the Western Cape cannot be compared directly to Silicon Valley, it does possess some core organic elements which in its infancy, could be likened to that of Silicon Valley in California, USA.

Silicon Cape as a concept was officially launched to the public on October 8, 2009. Attendance at the event was greater than anticipated and a new, larger venue had to be sourced. At the event there were representatives from schools, universities, start-ups, big business, local and national government, NGOs, and the venture capital industry. Over a third of the audience was expected to be young IT entrepreneurs. The launch was circulated through social media platforms Facebook and Twitter. Speakers included Dr. Johann Rupert (chairman of luxury goods company Richemont), Dr. Mamphela Ramphele (chairperson of the Technology Innovation Agency), Helen Zille (premier of the Western Cape) and Matthew Buckland (internet entrepreneur, founder of Creative Spark and Memeburn) who was the event's MC. At the launch, The Silicon Cape Foundation non-profit entity was formed by a 10-seat community.

== Structure ==
Silicon Cape is overseen by a 12-person steering committee.

== The Silicon Cape Initiative ==
The vision of the Silicon Cape is to be an organic ecosystem that functions in the Western Cape of South Africa. Its goal is to look to attract top technical talent and entrepreneurs to the Western Cape and to assist these parties in creating "world class" IP start-up companies in an environment that competes with other similar hubs around the world. Its ultimate goal is to help foster a high-technology district in the Western Cape.

The concept of the Silicon Cape is not owned or controlled by any single entity, and is a living concept of its participants. Any person globally is able to take advantage of the Silicon Cape network through the social networking platform of Silicon Cape.

=== Success ===
The Silicon Cape Initiative was very well received by the local community. Although there was no marketing budget or spend (the initiative was driven by word of mouth), the Silicon Cape received a large amount of press release from South Africa’s leading online publications. The following statistics were reported by 6 April 2010:

- 560 conversations discussing Silicon Cape
- Brand momentum: 43.077 mentions a day
- Most discussion was on Twitter (91%)
- 97.297% of conversation positive
- 557 175 opportunities to be seen (OTS)

In March 2011, Google announced the launch of Umbono (Xhosa for "vision"), a business incubator, and opened applications for venture capital of up to $50,000 as well as free internet and office space to existing and potential start-up companies. It announced that it would be collaborating with Silicon Cape and Bandwidth Barn, a regional business incubator. Google's South African country manager, cited Yola, Mxit and Twangoo as successful start-up companies which showed signs of development in the IT industry in the Western Cape.

Silicon Cape was an instrumental tool used for the establishment of a crowd funding network, an angel investor network that was established by Silicon Cape participants.

The initiative's first long-term partnership was secured in October 2014, when it was announced that they would be receiving an annual donation of R1 million for three years from First National Bank.

Silicon Cape was named Runner Up in South African Blog Awards 2016

=== Criticisms and challenges ===
Advocates of Silicon Cape have argued that in order to attract investors to the Western Cape, local and national government should create a tax free zone to enable growth in start-up companies.

At the launch of Silicon Cape, Johann Rupert stated, "we need a financial centre in the Western Cape and an IT centre that is tax neutral, where intellectual property is protected, and the Cape will flourish.". He emphasised the value of intellectual property given that the Western Cape does not have any raw resources which it can export. He further noted on the greater economy of South Africa, "we cannot survive if we rely on the export of raw materials. In the future, countries that are not net exporters of intellectual capital will not survive."

The imposition of exchange controls in South Africa, although eased in recent years, also obstructs growth in the IT sector of the region because local businesses are prohibited from trading in foreign currency and using e-commerce services such as PayPal on their local sites. On March 18, 2011, it was ruled by the Supreme Court of Appeal that "exchange control approval" is not required when transferring ownership of intellectual property to a non-resident, although no amendment to the present regulations has been made.

Other challenges include a perceived lack of skills in South Africa, a lack of large anchor corporates that provide management training, a lack of professional services firms available and affordable for the start-up market and lack of capital structures through angel funding networks.

Other regions of South Africa such as Gauteng have felt isolated from the Silicon Cape Initiative which has focused on the Western Cape as a region.

== See also ==
- Western Cape
- Silicon Valley
- Nona Creative
