= Thought leader (disambiguation) =

A thought leader is an individual or firm that is recognized as an authority in a specialized field.

Thought leader may also refer to:

- Thought Leader, a South African news website
- Thought leader (web) (or domain authority), describes the relevance of website for a specific subject area
