= Andrew Buckland =

Andrew Buckland may refer to:

- Andrew Buckland (playwright) (born 1954), South African playwright and performer
- Andrew Buckland (film editor), American film editor
