= Arthur Gostick Shorrock =

Baptist missionary (1861–1945)

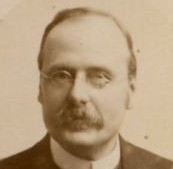
- Shorrock, c. 1920
- Born: 1861; Blackburn, England
- Died: 23 June 1945 (aged 83–84); Windsor, England
- Education: Spurgeon's College
- Occupation: Missionary
- Spouse: Maud Mary Doulton

Arthur Gostick Shorrock (1861–1945) was a Baptist missionary who worked in China for 40 years. Arthur was born in 1861 in Blackburn, Lancashire, England. He entered Spurgeon's College and as a student preacher took services at the Baptist Chapel in Wraysbury. There he met his future wife, Maud Doulton, a relative of both Henry Doulton the pottery manufacturer and William Thomas Buckland the Wraysbury auctioneer. Arthur then left to become a missionary in China before returning to live in Wraysbury after his retirement.

== Missionary work in China ==
Arthur joined the Baptist Missionary Society and went to China in 1887, firstly to Shandong. In 1897, he journeyed to India with one of China's most influential Baptist missionaries, Timothy Richard. Richard hoped to see the conditions of mission work in India and was pleased to have the "able and earnest" young missionary as a traveling companion. They visited Sri Lanka, Madras, Agra, Varanasi, Delhi, Mumbai and Kolkata, where Arthur "had a sharp attack of cholera, narrowly escaping with his life".

=== Shaanxi Baptist Mission ===
In 1892, Arthur Shorrock and Moir Duncan founded the Sianfu Mission, in present-day Xi'an, Shaanxi Province. Arthur was responsible for the Baptist mission work in Shaanxi and became the Principal of the Shaanxi Bible College. In 1898, Moir Duncan and his wife returned to England on a furlough. Maud Doulton, who was attending the Royal Holloway College before graduating in 1890, was then engaged to Arthur. She left England in January 1900 accompanied by the Duncans. Arthur and Maud were married soon after arriving in Shanghai and they and the Duncans arrived back in Xi'an on 24 May 1900. Seven weeks later, on 6 July they were forced to leave the city secretly to escape the Taiyuan Massacre during the Boxer Rebellion.

Two years later they returned and Maud then took responsibility for 'Women's Work', and in 1914 became principal of the church's Girls' High School in Xi'an. Up until shortly before Arthur Shorrock left China, the following missionaries had worked with him:

Baptist Missionaries working in Shaanxi (1890–1925)
Status	Total
Died prior to 1925	11
Transferred prior to 1925	19
Resigned prior to 1925	19
Working in 1925	32
Total staff 1890–1925	81

Together with the Chinese members they established the following:

Contributions of Baptist Missionaries in Shaanxi (1925)
Establishment	Total
Churches	125
Total church members	2584
Secondary Schools	2 boys; 2 girls
Elementary Schools (6 years)	4 boys; 4 girls
Elementary Schools (4 years)	45 boys; 6 girls
Kindergarten	1 girls
Bible school	1 men; 1 women
Total scholars	1550
Hospitals	2

=== War against opium ===
Arthur was horrified by the impact of the opium trade. In 1890 he was a founding member of the Permanent Committee for the Promotion of Anti-Opium Societies. Fellow committee members included the prominent missionaries John Glasgow Kerr MD, American Presbyterian Mission in Canton; B.C. Atterbury MD, American Presbyterian Mission in Beijing; Archdeacon Arthur Evans Moule, Church Missionary Society in Shanghai; Henry Whitney MD, American Board of Commissioners for foreign Missions in Fuzhou; the Rev Samuel Clarke, China Inland Mission in Guiyang and the Rev Griffith John, London Missionary Society in Hankou. They resolved to continue their opposition to the opium traffic, urging Christians in China to arouse public opinion against it. The desire of the missionaries that their ideas be carried out caused them to form "continuation committees" that were assigned tasks to assure that action would be taken on whatever matters had been approved by the conferences. He continued working with other missionaries opposed to the opium trade, including writing to Alexander Hosie about poppy cultivation and corruption associated with attempts to end the cultivation.

=== Xinhai Revolution ===
Once the Xinhai Revolution reached Shaanxi (then romanized as Shensi), resulting in the death of eight foreigners, an evacuation of all missionaries and other foreigners in the region was planned. The Rev J C Keyte and the explorer Arthur de Carle Sowerby planned the relief expedition, and all but a handful of the mission was successfully evacuated due to their efforts. However, Arthur, Maud and their daughter Mary remained in Shaanxi. Arthur gave the following reason for remaining: -

It would be un-Christian, as well as most unwise, for the doctors to leave at this stage. Their help has been earnestly sought, and the appreciation shown by soldiers and leaders has been most unmistakable. If we desert the people here in their extremity, they are not likely to give us much consideration in the days to come ...

=== Anti-Christian movement ===
Shaanxi Baptist Conference Group, Autumn 1925 Top row: Mr Russell, Misses Haslop, Williamson, Watson, Waddington and Mrs Stockley Second row: Mr and Mrs Burdett, Miss Curtis, Mr Arthur and Mrs Maud Shorrock, Dr Clement Stockley, Mr Watson and Mr Mudd Third row: Miss Rogers, Andre Stockley, Miss Franklin, Miss Birrell, and Mr Phillips Fourth row: Miss Dillow, Miss Dr Ruth Tait, Mr Bell, Mr Andrew Young, Harold Stockley

Arthur's contributions to China were rewarded with the awarding of the Order of the Excellent Crop, Third Class, conferred upon him by the President of the Republic of China in 1917. Popular sentiment in the 1920s in China was directed against missionaries, foreign merchants, Christian schools, churches and hospitals which were viewed as 'imperialistic'.

Arthur Shorrock helped organise the 1925 Shensi Baptist Conference, writing a book that argued that missionaries were not imperialist. At the time he wrote:

And so when the anti-Christian movement was at its height during the Christmas week, our reply to it was an effort in 'good deeds' visiting the prisoner in his prison, the orphan and the widow, and leaving with each a small gift in bread or cloth or some other useful gift. This is being repeated at the Chinese New Year, and so advantage is taken to show that Christianity is really the witness of a life touched with the feeling of brotherliness, rather than a force to bind the letters of Imperialism, or any other 'ism' It is encouraging to know that 21 have been baptized this year-not so many as we would have hoped, but considering the year, and all its opposition and propaganda, the result is good.

Many missionaries were forced to leave China in the following years. For the Baptist Missionary Society such experiences resulted in them becoming more sensitive to the political situation of different mission fields.

=== Evangelical methods ===
The evangelical methods used at the time in Shaanxi were described as follows:

Our Lord Jesus Himself, set us the example of preaching, teaching, and healing to spread the knowledge of His Kingdom, and many and varied were the methods He used to carry out these three principles of action. ... To accomplish this end we find Him adopting the following methods, at least, to win men.

- Itinerating through the villages
- Preaching in the synagogues
- Preaching to city crowds
- Talking to an individual
- Visiting homes
- Attending feasts
- Teaching by allegories and parables
- Teaching in retreats
- Teaching continually a group
- Healing by prayer alone
- Healing by prayer and material means
- Healing instantaneously
- Healing by degrees
- Sending out Evangelists

In all these ways we are engaged to-day, with the additional method of literary propaganda, which we are assured our Lord sanctions, for how often did He ask His hearers 'Have your never read?'

== Return to England ==
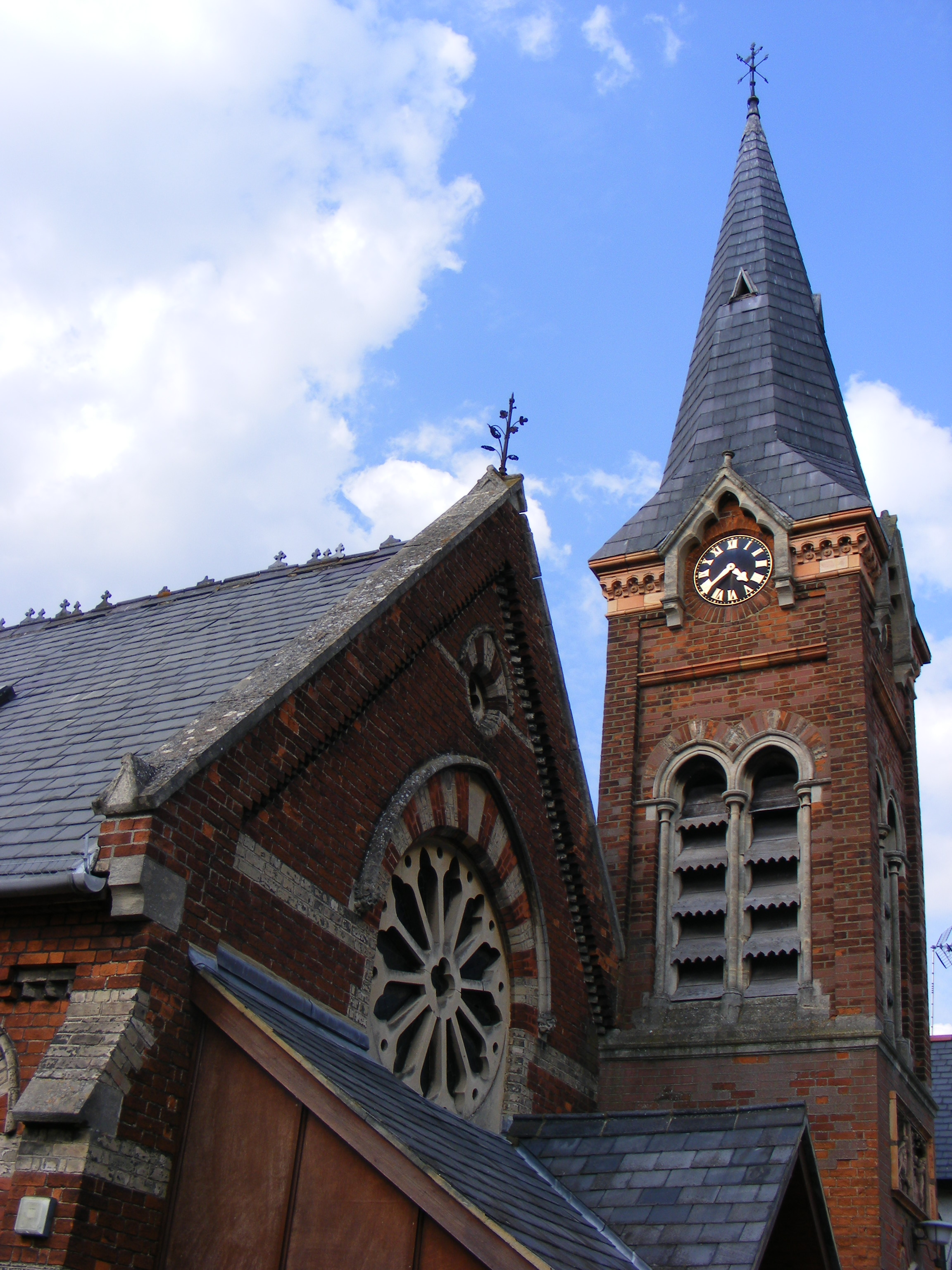
Baptist Chapel in Wraysbury

While missionaries and other foreigners were besieged in Xianfu, Arthur's wife, Maude, died on 25 September 1925 of typhoid. After his retirement, he returned to Wraysbury and became the minister of the Baptist Chapel there. He died on 13 June 1945 in Windsor, aged 83, and is buried in Wraysbury together with his wife.
