= George Tinworth =

English ceramic artist

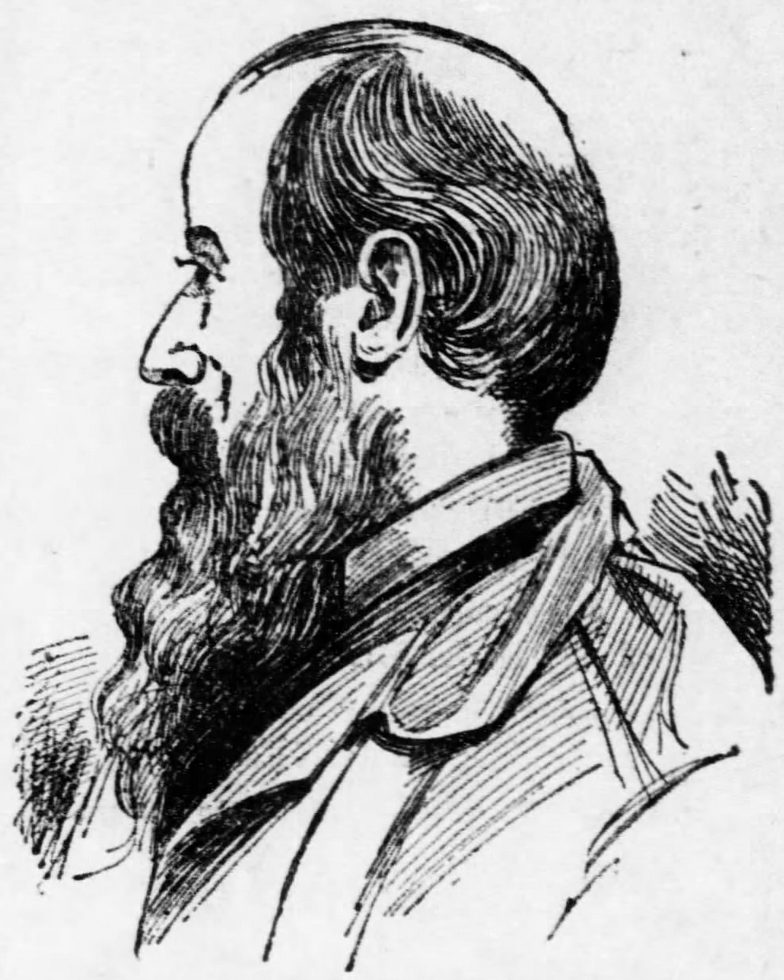
- Born: 5 November 1843; London, England
- Died: 11 September 1913 (aged 69); London, England
- Occupation: Artist
- Employer: Doulton

George Tinworth (5 November 1843 – 11 September 1913) was an English ceramic artist who worked for the Doulton factory at Lambeth from 1867 until his death.

== Birth and training ==
Born at 6 Milk Street, Walworth Common, South London, England, Tinworth was the son of a greengrocer turned wheelwright and the family suffered extreme poverty. Brought up to follow in his father's footsteps, he spent his spare time carving off-cuts and soon showed a precocious talent for art. He had been impressed as a boy with so-called living statues who displayed themselves at fairs. He used to peek through the cracks of the tents. At home he began to "do the statues before the looking-glass." (Chums boys' annual, 1896, page 135). He started to carve butter stamps and a foreman plasterer in the next street suggested he went to art school to study anatomy. At nineteen he pawned his overcoat to pay for evening classes at the local Lambeth School of Art in Kennington Park Road. In Chums Boys Annual of 1896 Tinworth explained: "I had to keep the whole affair dark from my father. Indeed, I went to Lambeth School of Art of a night for months before he knew anything about it. He used to ask my mother where I was, but happily for me she always refused to gratify his curiosity." (Chums, 1896).

Before he sold any work he made money by mending cart wheels. He also worked in a fireworks factory earning half a crown per week. From there he moved to a hot presser's where for four shillings per week he worked from seven in the morning until nine at night.

In the same year that he began study at Lambeth he created 'The Mocking of Christ', now on show at the Cuming Museum on the Walworth Road, Southwark.

From the Lambeth School of Art (now the City and Guilds of London Art School) he went on to the Royal Academy Schools in 1864, winning various medals for his work.

== Doulton & Co ==
After the Royal Academy he got a job with Doulton, the Lambeth stoneware manufacturer, Tinworth had previously been one of a group of students from the Lambeth School of Art who assisted its principal, John Sparkes in the making of a terracotta frieze for an extension to Doulton's premises.

He began work at the Doulton factory making cases for water filters, but soon moved on to making the new range of salt-glazed stoneware that became known simply as "Doulton Ware". About thirty examples of his work were shown at the 1867 Paris Exhibition. His father died in the same year, and he was left as the main supporter of his mother and family.

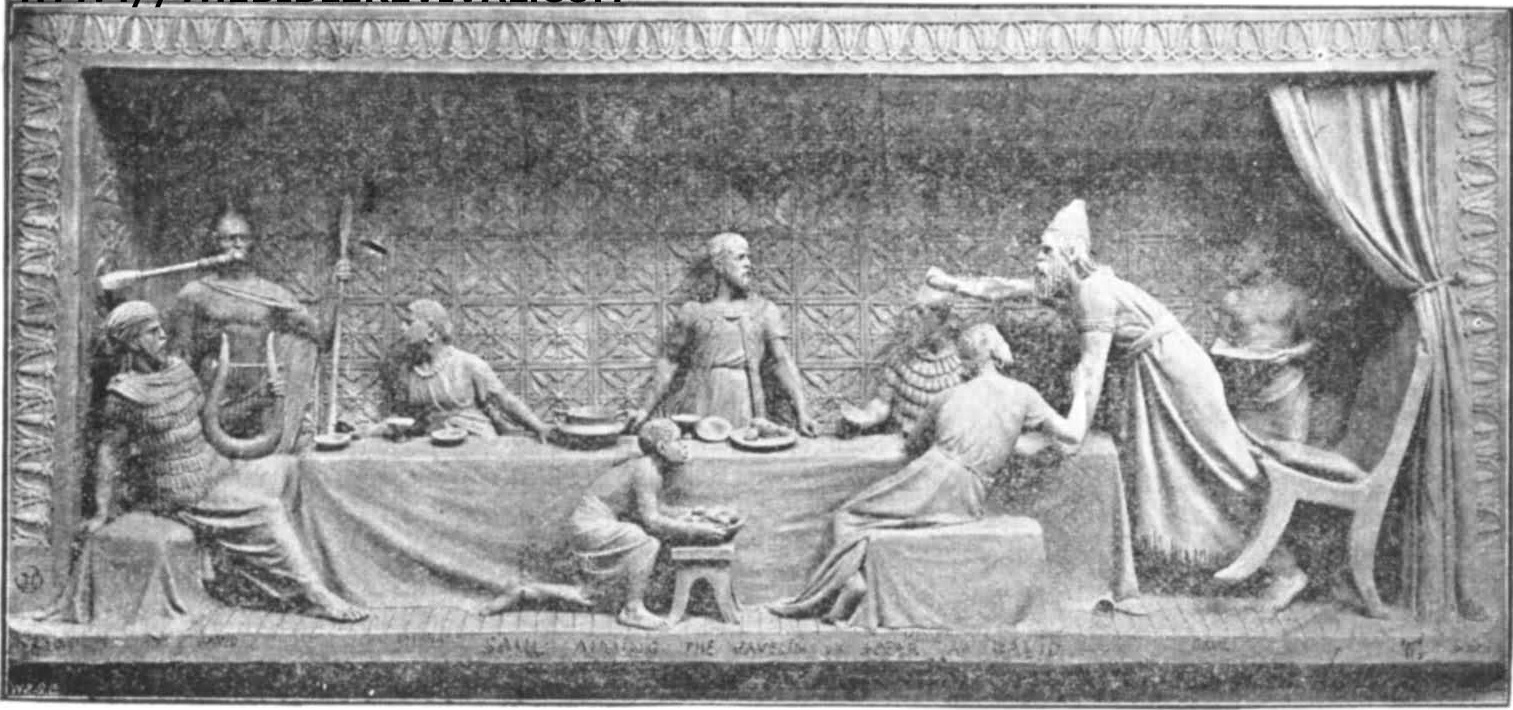
Saul throws a spear at David by Tinworth

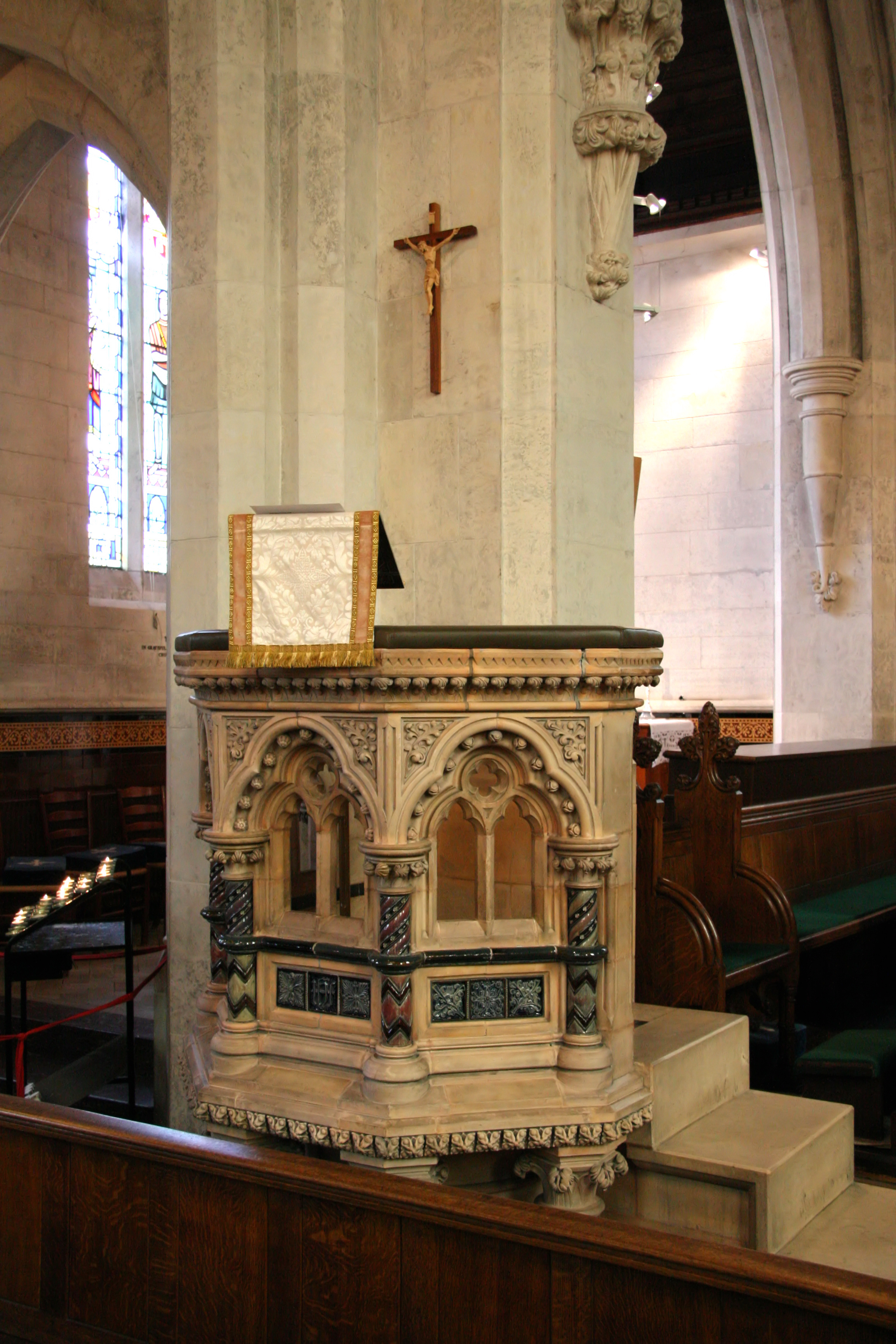
The pulpit in St. Alban's Anglican Church in Copenhagen, Denmark, donated by Doulton and designed by Tinworth

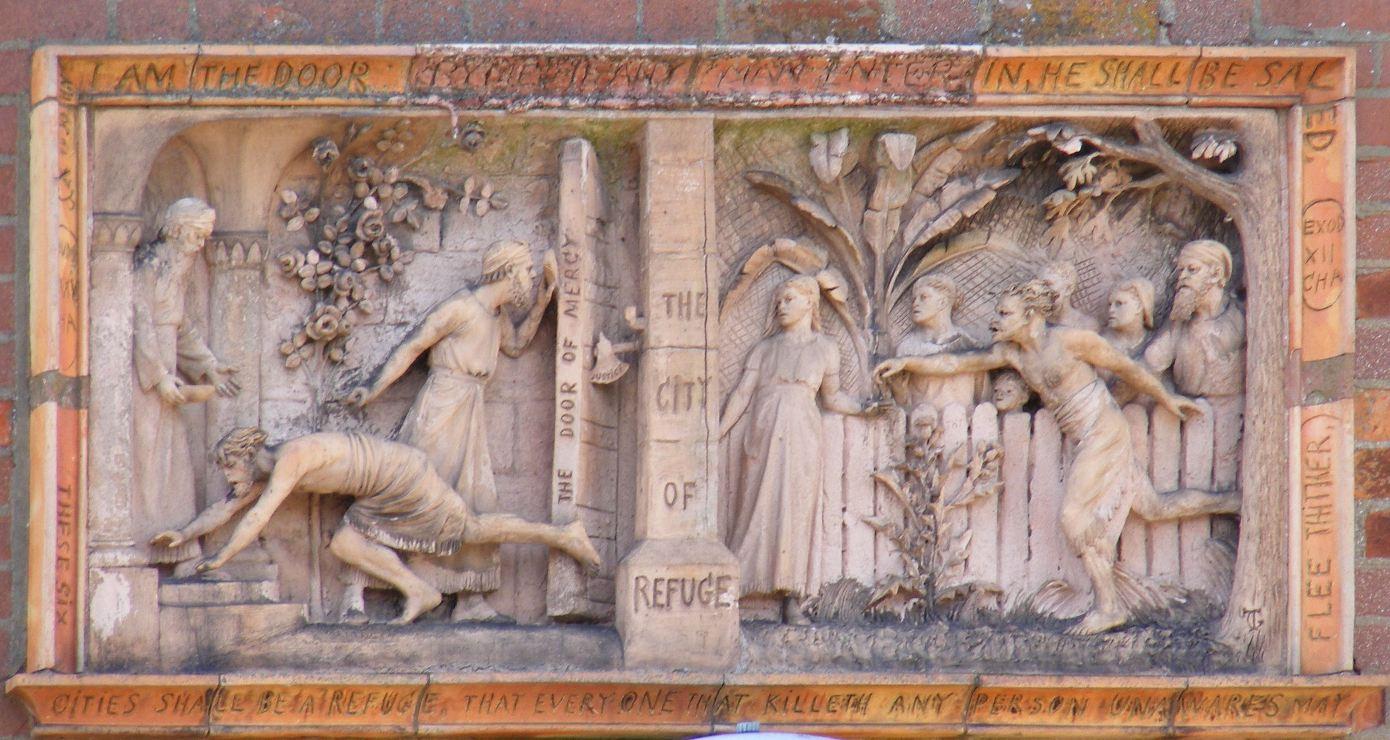
The City of Refuge by Tinworth, Wraysbury Baptist Chapel

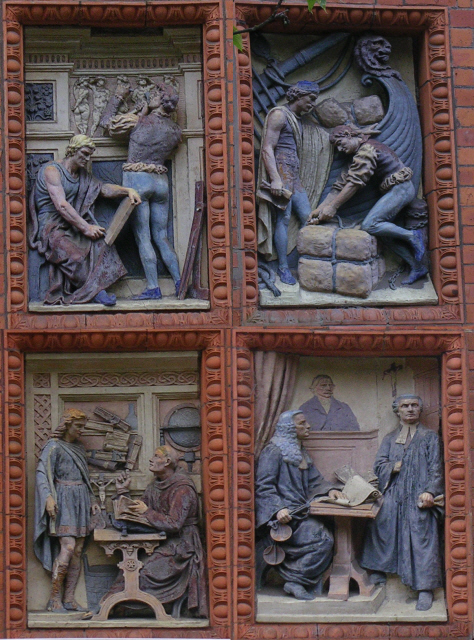
Four decorative panels by Tinworth, from St Bede's College, Manchester

At Doulton, he produced vases, jugs, humorous figures and animals and larger pieces. Through his engagement with Doulton, Tinworth also designed an altarpiece, a pulpit and a font for St. Alban's Anglican Church which was consecrated in 1887 in Copenhagen, Denmark. They were donations from the factory to the church and manufactured in terra cotta with salt glazed details to Tinworth 's design.

== Notable work ==
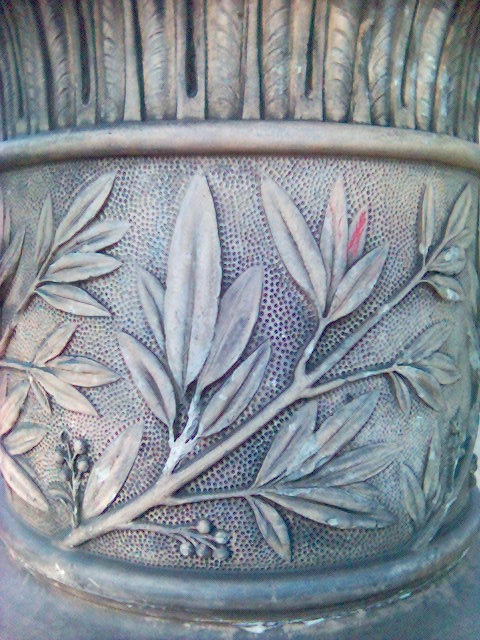
Detail: The Fountain of Life

The Cuming Museum, Southwark, has three examples of his life-sized clay heads and a terracotta scene entitled The Jews making bricks under Egyptian Taskmasters. This last was presented to the museum by Doulton and Co in 1914 as a memorial to Tinworth; they seem not to have recognised that it could be interpreted as an allegory of the exploitation of his fellow clayworkers.

Many of his pieces were shown at the Royal Academy where they were admired by John Ruskin, amongst others. The first to be exhibited there, in the year he joined the school, was a group of children fighting called "Peace and Wrath in Low Life". A large scale terracotta fountain, "The Fountain of Life", was donated to Kennington Park by Henry Doulton in 1872 (or 1869?). This was vandalised in the 1980s and The Friends of the Park are seeking funding for its restoration.

Other pieces by Tinworth are to be found in the Museum of Garden History in Lambeth; adjacent to the main entrance of St Bede's College, Manchester; in the panel above the entrance to the former Doulton Works in Black Prince Road, Lambeth; the Baptist Chapel in Wraysbury; in Truro Cathedral, Cornwall; in St Mark's Church in Hanley, Stoke-on-Trent; and in St Mary's Church in Burton, Wiltshire.

In 1870, Tinworth was commissioned to produce two stone friezes for the royal parish church at Sandringham, Norfolk. The works, entitled The Brazen Serpent and Descent from the Cross were later removed from the church and in 1930 were donated by The Royal Collection to St Gabriel's Church, North Acton, following a national appeal for assistance in completing the church, after its construction costs exceeded the available funds. They remain on public display in Acton.

The Cuming Museum has Tinworth's major independent art project in storage. This is a 4-foot-high (1.2 m) model of a project for an elaborate memorial to Southwark's connection with Shakespeare, made in 1904. Enough public donations were never achieved to realise it. Though this was Tinworth's most ambitious autonomous art project, he also made a number of complex figure compositions in relief, including The Release of Barabas and Saul attacking David.

The Southwark Local Studies Archive has his manuscript (and unpublished) autobiography.

At York Minster, the reredos of St Stephen's Chapel in terracotta is due to Tinworth. It was added in 1937.

== Death ==
Tinworth died in London on 11 September 1913 and was buried in his mother's plot at West Norwood Cemetery. The monument on the tomb was one of many destroyed by the London Borough of Lambeth, who reused the grave for new burials in the 1980s. After a legal protest by a descendant, Lambeth placed a simple plaque commemorating the people buried in the plot.

His name is commemorated in Tinworth Street, Lambeth.
