= William Buckland (disambiguation) =

William Buckland may refer to:

- William Buckland (1784–1856), English geologist and palaeontologist
- William Buckland (architect) (1734–1774), American architect
- William Thomas Buckland (1798–1870), English surveyor and auctioneer
- William Francis Buckland (1847–1915), New Zealand politician
- William Buckland (politician) (1819–1876), New Zealand politician
- William Warwick Buckland (1859–1946), Roman Law scholar
