= St. Alban's Church, Copenhagen =

Coordinates: 55°41′21″N 12°35′49″E

St. Alban's Church
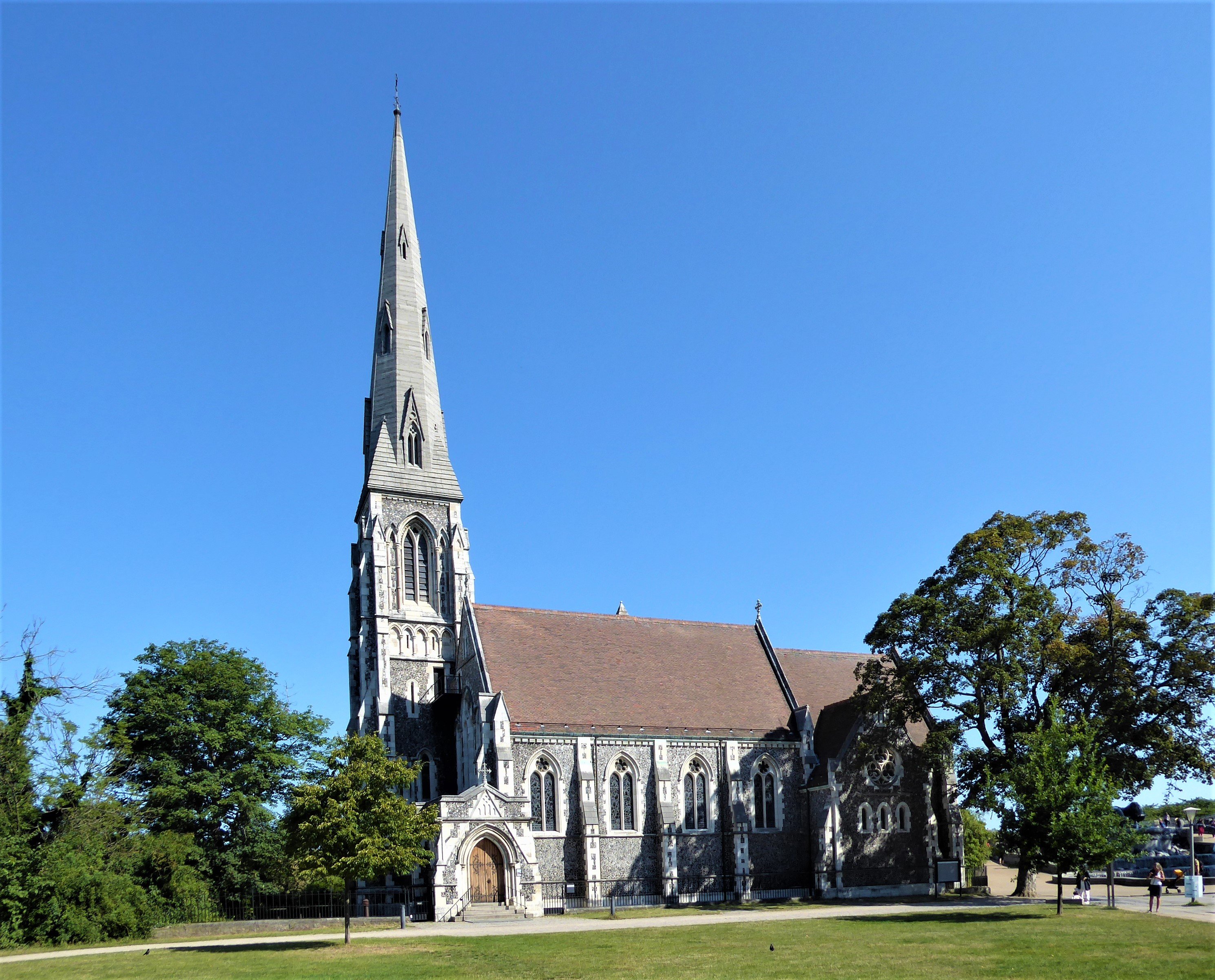
- St. Alban's viewed from the south
- St. Alban's Church
- Location: Churchillparken 11, Langelinie, Copenhagen
- Country: Denmark
- Denomination: Church of England
- Website: st-albans.dk

History
- Dedicated: 17 September 1887

Architecture
- Architect(s): Arthur Blomfield, Ludvig Fenger
- Style: Gothic Revival
- Years built: 1887

Administration
- Diocese: Europe

Clergy
- Bishop: Robert Innes

St. Alban's Church, locally often referred to simply as the English Church, is an Anglican church in Copenhagen, Denmark. It was built from 1885 to 1887 for the benefit of the growing English congregation in the city. Designed by Arthur Blomfield as a traditional English parish church in the Gothic Revival style, it is in a peaceful park setting at the end of Amaliegade in the northern part of the city centre, next to the citadel Kastellet and the Gefion Fountain and Langelinie.

The church is part of the Church of England's Diocese in Europe. It is dedicated to Saint Alban, the first martyr of Great Britain.

== History ==
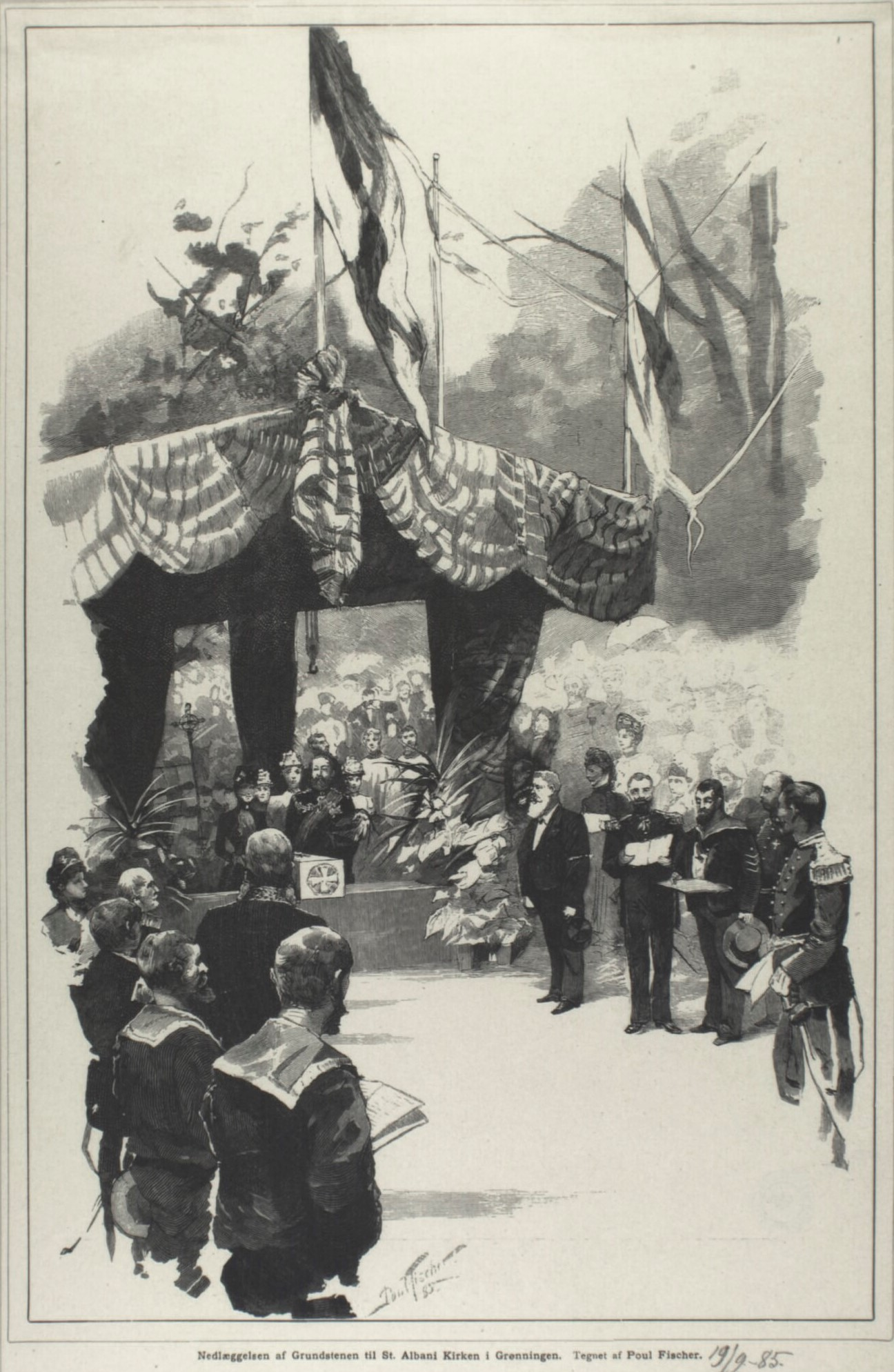
The foundation stone ceremony in 1885

The first sizable British community in Denmark settled in Elsinore in the early 16th century. The town was an important logistical hub for the collection of Sound Dues. First to arrive was a community of Scots which had a Scottish altar dedicated to Saint Jacob, Saint Andrew and the Scottish Saint Ninian in the local Saint Olaf's Church. The altar has now been moved to the National Museum of Denmark. Much of the Øresund traffic was British (in 1850 7,000 out of 20,000 passing ships were British) and over the course of time many English shipping agencies were established in Elsinore. There was even a British consul there, while Copenhagen had only a vice-consul. However, under the King's Law from 1665, which had instituted absolutism in Denmark, Lutheranism was the only faith allowed to hold religious services in Denmark. During the second half of the 18th century more and more foreign denominations were granted royal exemptions to this prohibition.

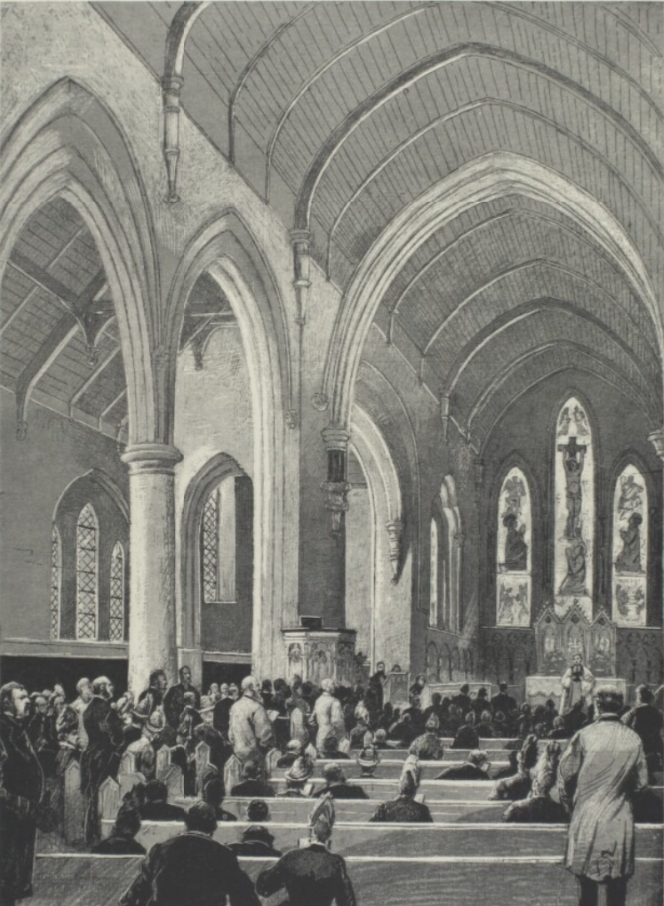
The interior of the church seen on a drawing by Knud Gamborg from 1887

Up through the 19th century the English community in Copenhagen grew as the city's significance as a centre of commerce increased. An English congregation held religious services in rented rooms in Store Kongensgade near Kongens Nytorv from 1834. The congregation had ambitions to build their own church and a Church Building Committee was established in 1854 but remained unable to find the means needed for the project. In 1864, it made an appeal to the then-Prince of Wales, and his consort, the Danish-born Princess Alexandra, took it upon her to assist. She managed to raise funds as well as provide a very attractive site for its construction when she persuaded the Danish Ministry of War to grant permission to have the church built on the esplanade outside the citadel Kastellet.

The foundation stone of St. Alban's Church was laid on 19 September 1885. The church was designed by Arthur Blomfield. It was consecrated two years later on 17 September 1887. Present on the opening day was a large display of European royalty, including the Prince and Princess of Wales, King Christian IX and Queen Consort Louise of Denmark, Tsar Alexander III and Tsarina Maria Feodorovna of Russia and George I and Olga of Greece. Like Princess Alexandra, both George I and Maria Feodorovna were born Danish, issue of the Danish King and Queen Consort. Also present were the entire diplomatic corps, ministers, representatives of the army and navy, Anglican church officials and Greek Orthodox, Russian Orthodox and Roman Catholic priests. After the consecration, the Prince and Princess of Wales hosted a lunch on board the Royal Yacht HMY Osborne to which all those who had been closely connected with the realisation of the church were invited.

== Royal patronage ==
St Alban's Church, Copenhagen, has a long history of royal patronage, reflecting the strong historical and cultural ties between the British royal family and Denmark. Since its consecration in 1887, the church has enjoyed the support of British monarchs and members of the royal family.

=== List of royal patrons ===
==== Queen Alexandra (1901–1925) ====
Born Princess Alexandra of Denmark, she married Edward VII and became Queen Consort of the United Kingdom. Her support was instrumental in establishing St Alban's Church.

==== Queen Elizabeth II (1952–2022) ====
Queen Elizabeth II continued the tradition of royal patronage for St Alban's Church throughout her reign.

==== Duchess of Gloucester (2024–present) ====
Following the death of Queen Elizabeth II, the Duchess of Gloucester became the patron of St. Alban's Church in October 2024.

== Architecture ==
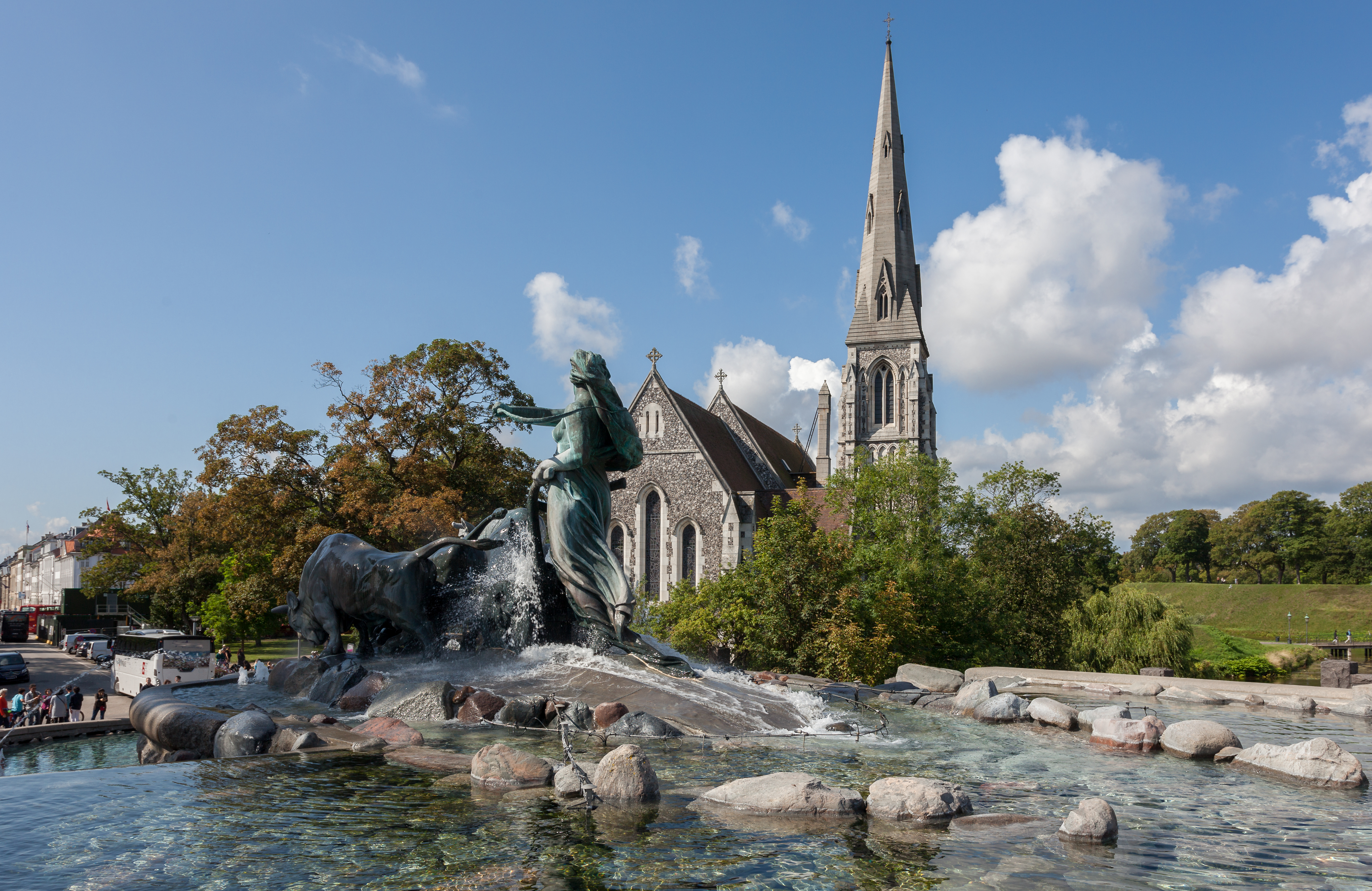
The church with the Gefion Fountain in the foreground

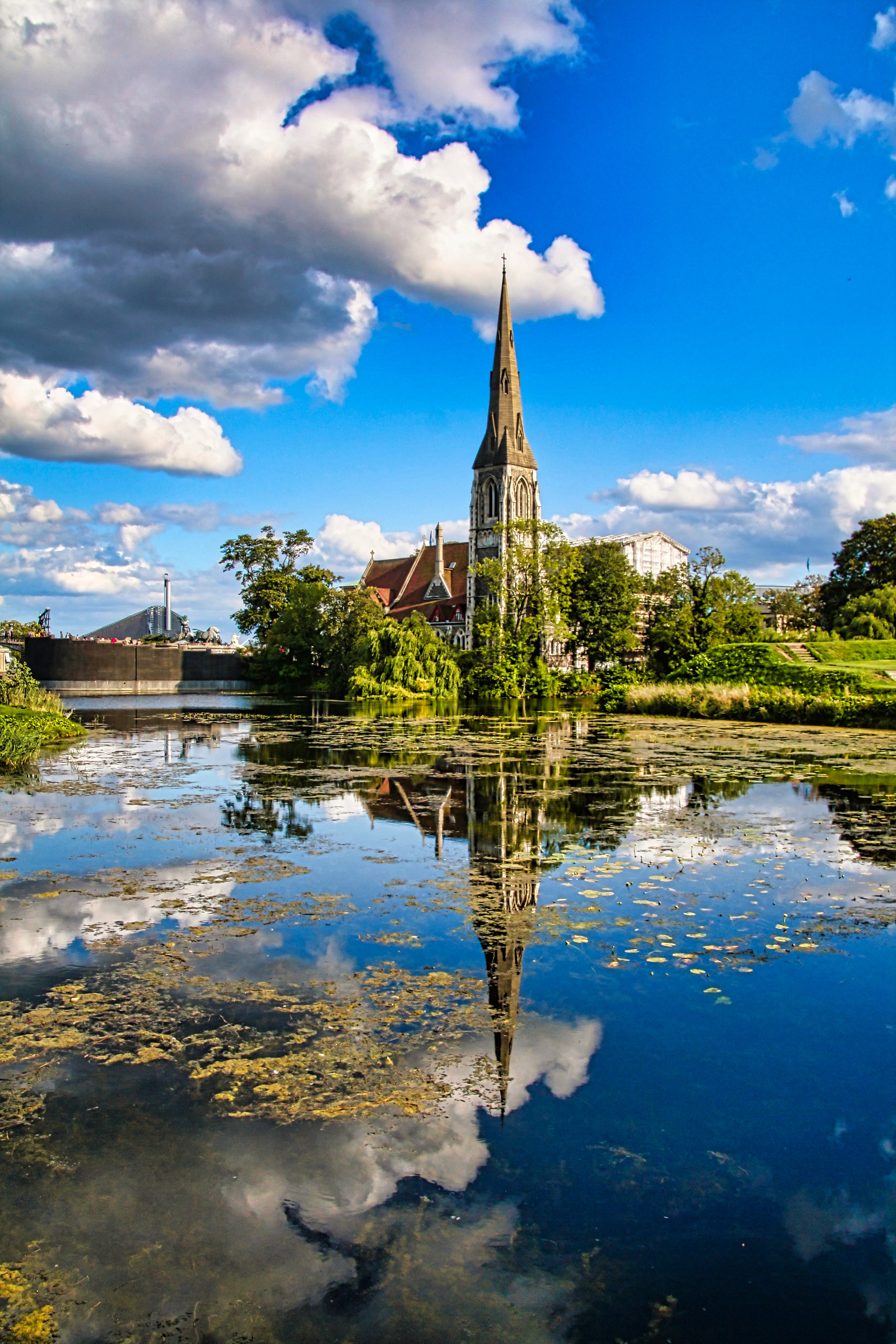
St Alban's Church seen from Kastellet Bridge

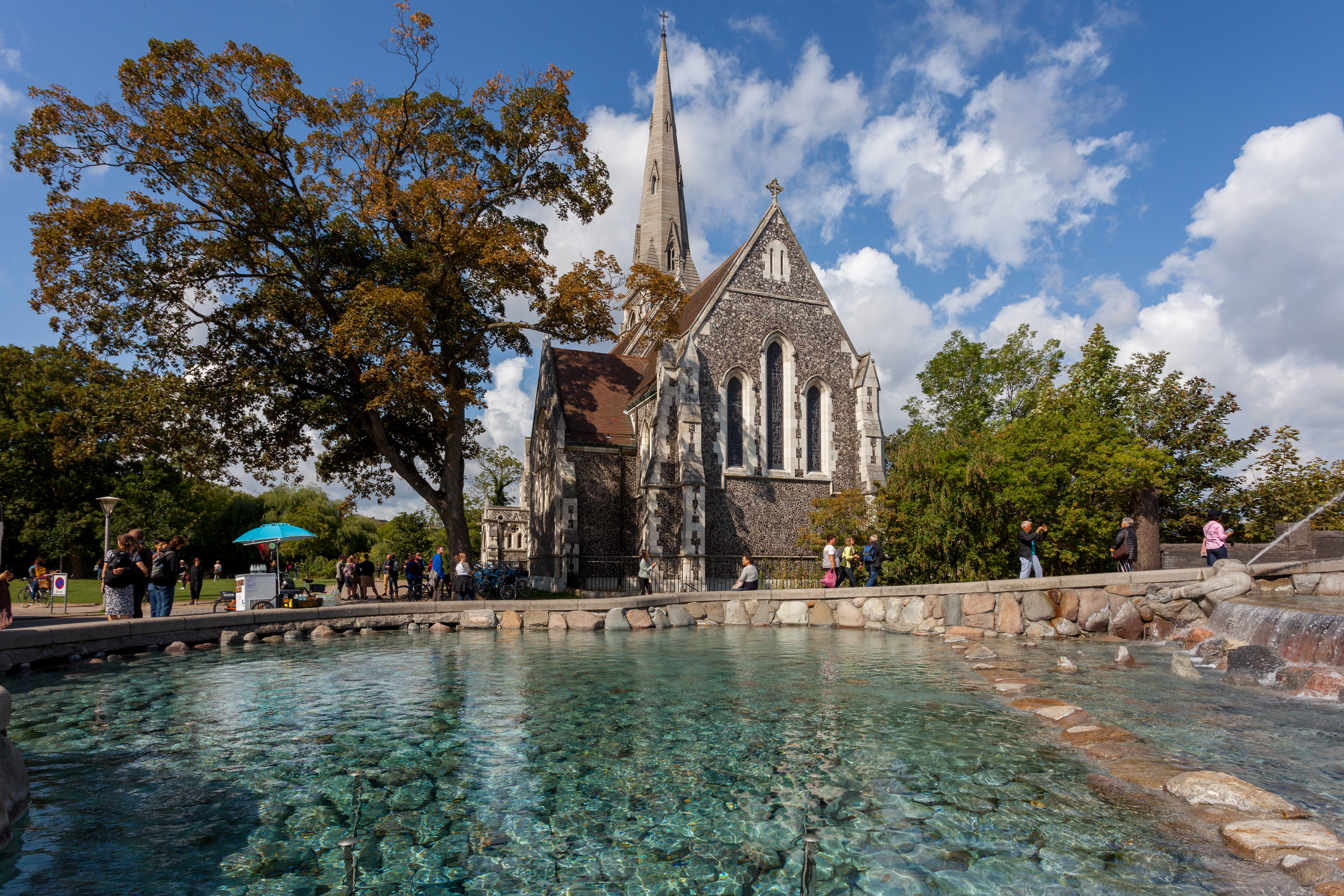
St Alban's church

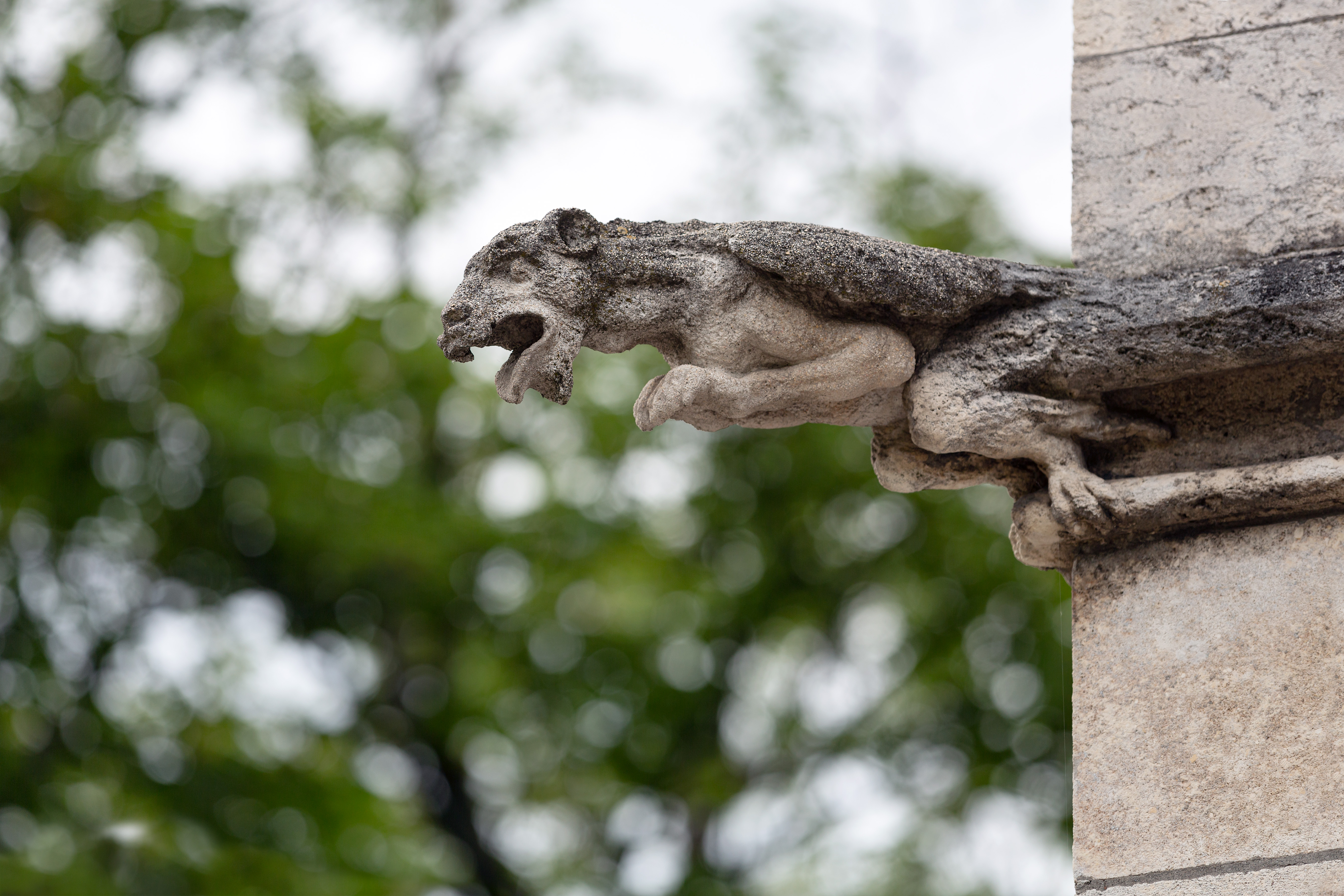
Gargoyle at St Alban's church

St. Alban's Church is designed as a traditional English church by Arthur Blomfield who designed a number of parish churches around Britain and received the Royal Institute of British Architects' Royal Gold Medal in 1891. It is built in the Gothic Revival style inspired by the Early English Style, also known as Lancet Gothic.

The church is built in limestone from the Faxe south of Copenhagen, knapped flint from Stevns and Åland stone for the spire. The conspicuous use of flint as a building material, unusual in Denmark, is another typical trait from England where it is commonly seen in church buildings in the south of the country, particularly East Anglia. The tiles on the roof are from Broseley in Shropshire.

The tower contains fifteen tubular bells. It was not deemed strong enough to support regular bells, and a set of eight was presented by the Prince of Wales when the church was built. These can be played manually on an Ellacombe Frame, on which the player pulls a rope for the relevant bell. In 2013 the Prince of Wales contributed to a new fund, which enabled a further seven bells to be installed, and for all fifteen to be played automatically by computer. Every quarter-hour the 80 louvres (two sets of ten on each face) open while the bells sound a quarter chime, and after striking the hour play a hymn tune. The original bells are by the English firm of Harringtons, as are the additional seven, which were made redundant by Holy Trinity Church, Oswestry, and retuned to suit. The striking system is by the Dutch firm of Petit & Fritsen.

== Furnishings ==
Many items of the church's inventory and fittings were donated, including the tiles on the floor and dado which are from Campbell Tile Co. and the carved oakwood pews which were a gift from Thomas Cook and Son. The altarpiece, pulpit and font were donated by Doulton, Lambeth, London, a leading manufacturer of stoneware and ceramics. For the first time, they were all made in terracotta with salt glazed details. They were designed by the artist George Tinworth.

The church organ was made by J. W. Walker & Sons Ltd and is located in the choir in the southern transept. It was renovated in 1966 by the same company.

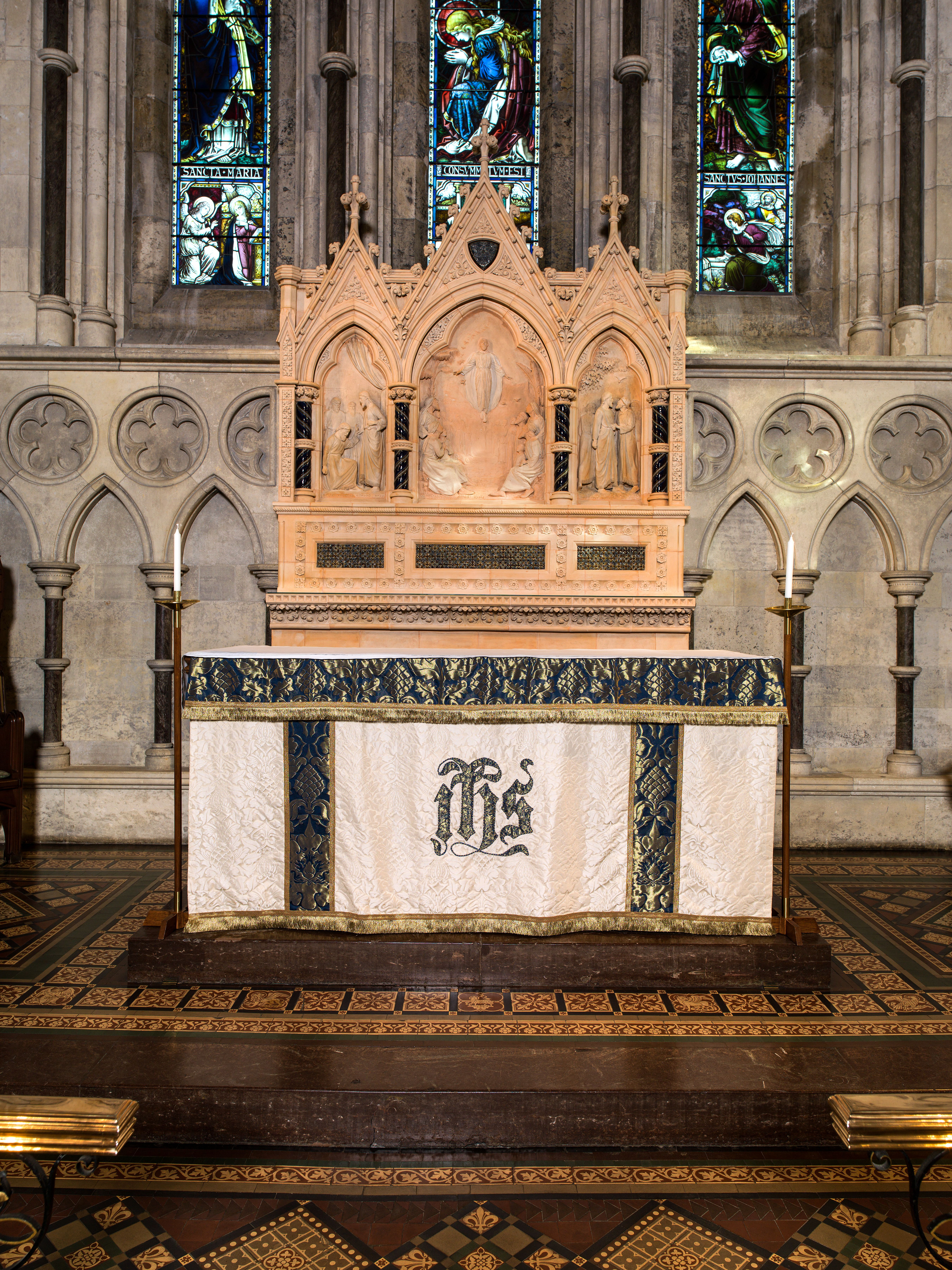
Altar

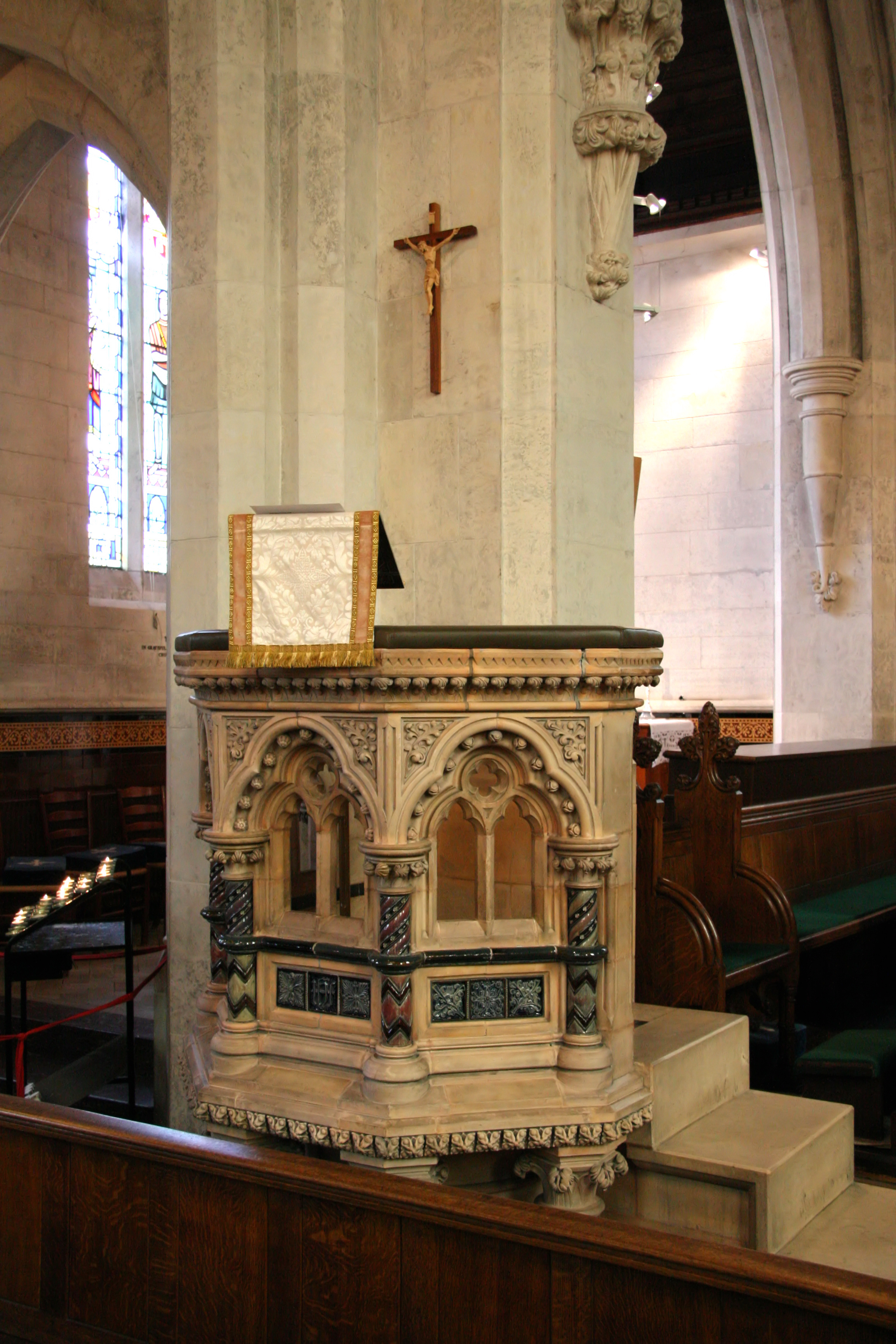
Pulpit

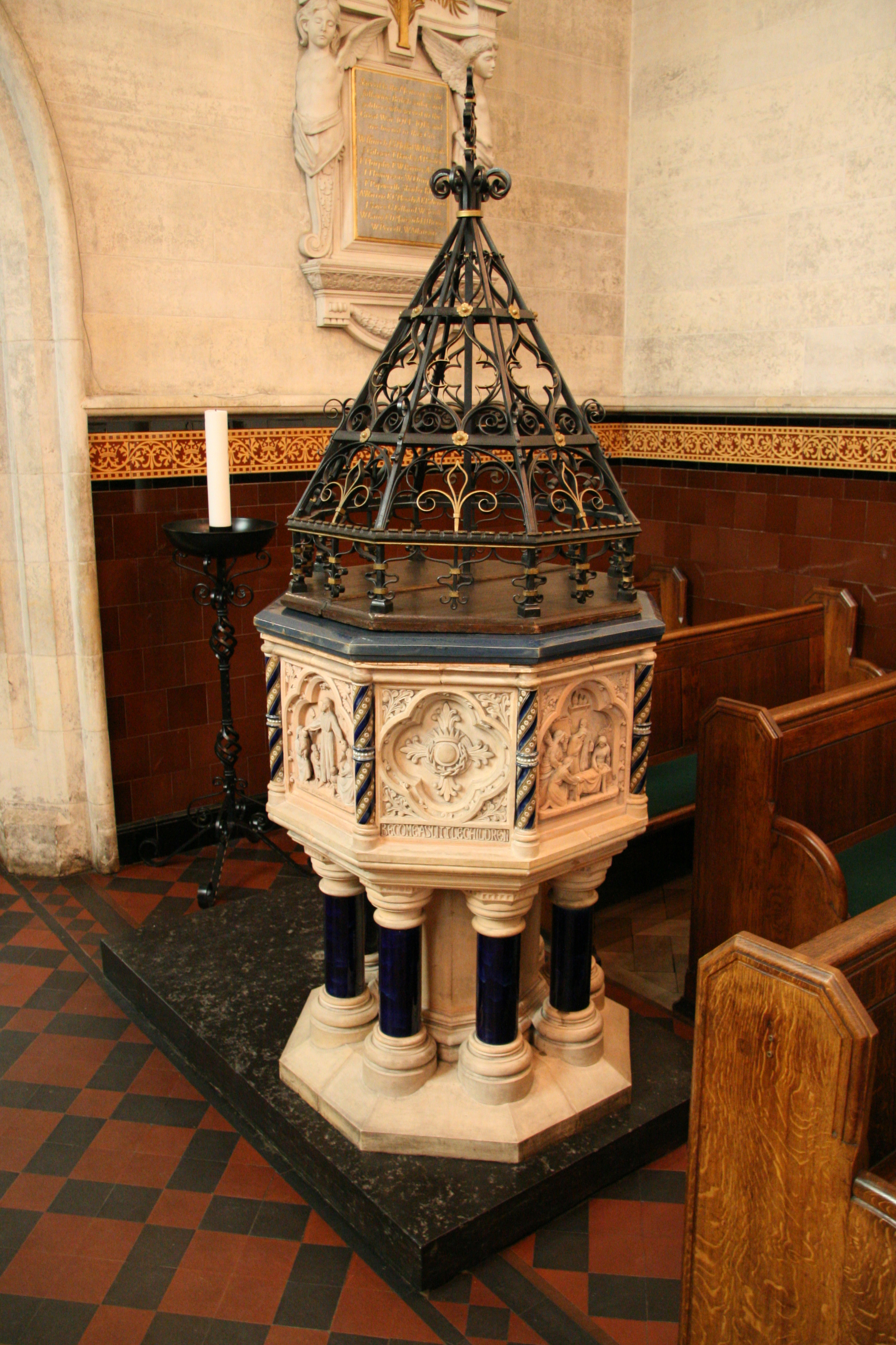
Font

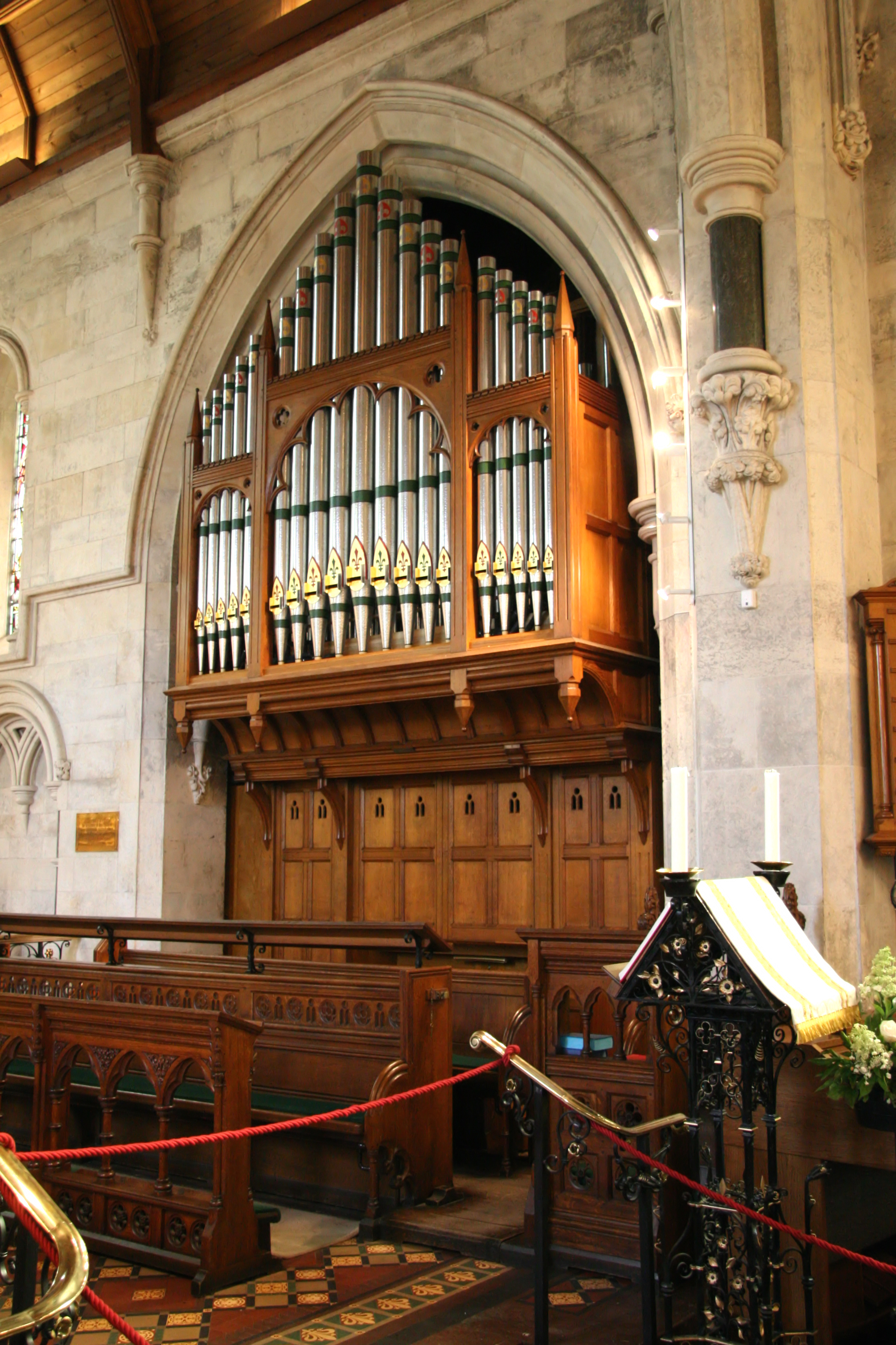
Organ
