= Sarah Britten =

South African writer

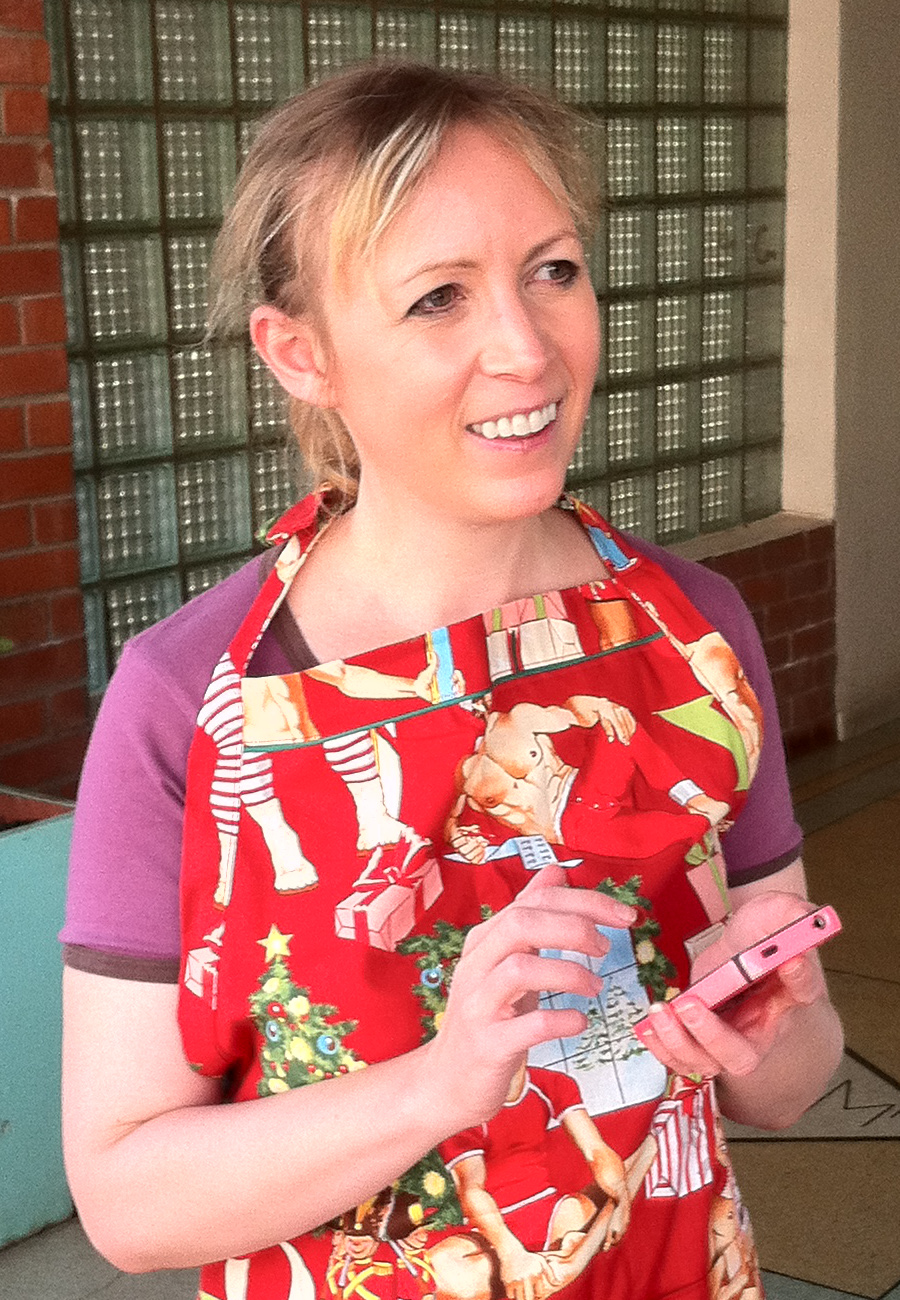
- Britten in 2012
- Born: Sarah Jane Britten; 31 August 1974 (age 52); Johannesburg, South Africa
- Education: Wits University
- Occupations: Writer, artist, communication strategist
- Writing career
- Genres: Young adult fiction, non-fiction
- Website: www.thoughtleader.co.za/sarahbritten

Sarah Jane Britten (born 31 August 1974) is a South African writer, blogger, lipstick artist and communication strategist. she previously tweeted that she could not afford to pay her child's school fees

== Early life and career ==
Britten attended Bryanston Primary School and Redhill High School in Johannesburg and studied Drama at the University of the Witwatersrand, where she completed a BA(Hons) in Dramatic Art in 1996, a MA in Communication Studies in 1997 and a PhD in Applied English Language Studies in 2005. At university she explored her interests in national identity and humour with a Masters Research Report on South African humour, focussing on the Madam & Eve comic strip, and her PhD thesis One Nation, One Beer: The Mythology of the New South Africa in Advertising.

She worked in journalism and advertising prior to becoming a freelance communication strategist.

=== Writing ===
Britten has authored two young adult fiction novels and three non-fiction books on local insults. In 2012 she wrote "... insults are also markers of collective identity. This is why I started collecting South African insults back in 2004: I wanted to understand what makes us who we are, and insults are one prism through which to view the national self ...".

She regularly contributes to Thought Leader, a news and opinion website run by the Mail & Guardian newspaper.

She wrote the chapter How Not to Emigrate in Should I stay or should I go? To live in or leave South Africa, having returned to South Africa after emigrating to Australia in 2008. In the editor's introduction to the book, Tim Richman writes: "Many of the contributions in this book are deeply personal; such is the nature of the topic. For Sarah Britten, there was no other way to approach her traumatic and disastrous emigration experience, one that ultimately destroyed her marriage. Or, as she suggests, perhaps it extended it beyond its sell-by date. Sarah is candid, open, honest, raw – uncomfortably at times. But hers is a necessary and hugely revealing piece, clarifying both the extent of the life-hold that emigration can exert on individuals and families, as well as the stresses it can generate." At the time, she wrote about her emigration experience on her Thought Leader blog which she named Gondwanaland after the ancient Gondwana supercontinent that included Africa, Australia and Antarctica.

=== Lipstick art ===
Britten paints cityscapes and other subjects, namely still life, bulls and bears (stock market trend symbols), dogs, cats, horses, sharks, crocodiles, rhinos, Nguni cattle and dung beetles, with lipstick. Her art is influenced by Zoo City, a science fiction novel by South African author Lauren Beukes. On her art website, she says: "Set in Hillbrow, the zoo city of the title, it features characters mysteriously attached to animal familiars as a form of punishment. Zoo City is riotous, chaotic and completely crazy and I loved the way it brought to life the animal energy that lurks just beneath the surface of the city. After reading the book, I started experimenting with placing animals in cityscapes, both the kind that are found in cities (dogs and cats) and those that exist in Johannesburg only as metaphors – sharks and crocodiles, for example. I’ve used a limited palette of black, grey and red to evoke the dystopian atmosphere of the city, its grey grittiness a contrast to throbbing red life. The Zoo City series led to my experiments with Ngunis, which have taken me in a more colourful direction." The first public exhibition of her lipstick art, named Pulse of the City and inspired by a Land Rover marketing campaign, was held at Velo gallery café in Braamfontein in July 2012.

== Awards ==
- 2000 Sanlam Prize for Youth Literature – Silver – The Worst Year of My Life – So Far
- 2002 Sanlam Prize for Youth Literature – Silver – Welcome to the Martin Tudhope Show!

== Publications ==
- Britten, Sarah (2000). The Worst Year of My Life – So Far (1st ed.). Cape Town: Tafelberg. ISBN 9780624039297.
- Britten, Sarah (2002). Welcome to the Martin Tudhope Show! (1st ed.). Cape Town: Tafelberg. ISBN 9780624036890.
- Britten, Sarah (2004). Ihr seid anders, wir sind besser (You are different, we are better) (in German). Translated by Stefanie Schäfer (1. Aufl., dt. Erstausg. ed.). München: Bertelsmann-Jugendbuch-Verl. ISBN 9783570302408. German translation of The Worst Year of My Life – So Far.
- Britten, Sarah (2006). The art of the South African insult. Johannesburg: 30° South. ISBN 9781920143053.
- Britten, Sarah (2007). McBride of Frankenmanto: The return of the South African insult. Johannesburg: 30° South. ISBN 9781920143183.
- Britten, Sarah (2009). More South African insults. Johannesburg: 30° South. ISBN 9780958489089.
- Britten, Sarah (2010). "How Not to Emigrate". In Richman, Tim (ed.). Should I stay or should I go? To live in or leave South Africa. Cape Town: Two Dogs. ISBN 9781920137304.
