= Steven Friedman =

South African academic and journalist (born 1953)

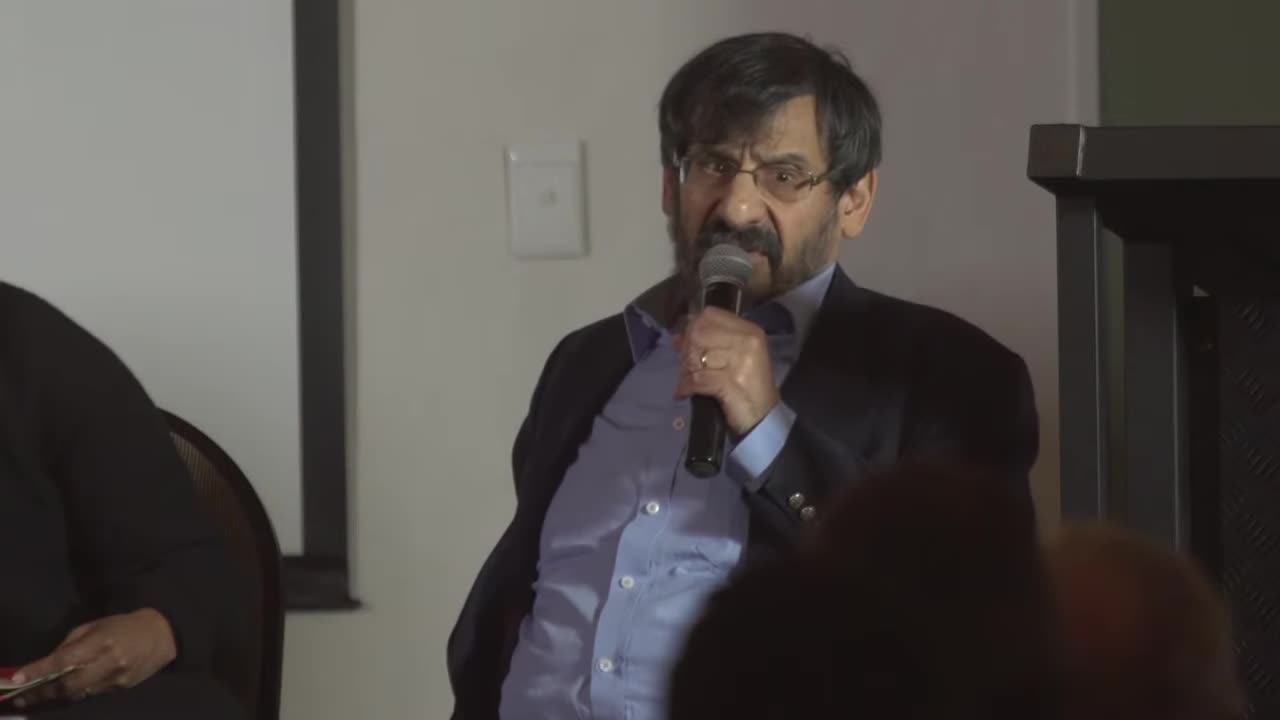
- Born: 31 March 1953 (age 73)

Academic background
- Education: Rhodes University

Academic work
- Discipline: Political scientist
- Institutions: University of Johannesburg; Rhodes University

Steven Eli Friedman (born 31 March 1953) is a South African academic, newspaper columnist, intellectual, activist, former trade unionist and journalist. He holds a doctorate in literature from Rhodes University (2007) and directs the Centre for the Study of Democracy, a joint project by Rhodes University and the University of Johannesburg. His book Building Tomorrow Today: African Workers in Trade Unions 1970-1984 has been described as a classic South African text. He was appointed the National Head of the Independent Electoral Commission's Information Analysis Department during preparations for South Africa's 1994 election.

He has written opinion pieces for Thought Leader and The New Age and currently writes a weekly column for Business Day.

He is also a strong supporter of rights for Palestinians and a proponent of a one state solution in Israel and Palestine.

He is the father of Daniel Friedman, a musical comedian known on stage as Deep Fried Man.

== Books ==
Steven Friedman (2014)

- Friedman, Steven (1987). Building tomorrow today : African workers in trade unions, 1970-1984 (1. publ. ed.). Johannesburg: Ravan Press. ISBN 9780869752876.
- Centre for Policy Studies (1993). Steven Friedman (ed.). The long journey : South Africa's quest for a negotiated settlement. Braamfontein, South Africa: Ravan Press. ISBN 9780869754443.
- Steven Friedman, ed. (2014). Race, Class and Power: Harold Wolpe and the Radical Critique of Apartheid. Pietermaritzburg, South Africa: UKZN Press. ISBN 978-1-86914-286-5.
- Friedman, Steven (2019). Power in Action: Democracy, Citizenship and Social Justice. South Africa: NYU Press. ISBN 9781776143023.
- Friedman, Steven (2021). One Virus, Two Countries: What COVID-19 Tells Us About South Africa. South Africa: Wits University Press. ISBN 9781776147441.
- Friedman, Steven (2023). Good Jew, Bad Jew: Racism, anti-Semitism and the assault on meaning. South Africa: Wits University Press. ISBN 9781776148493.
