= Wraysbury Baptist Chapel =

Chapel in Berkshire, England

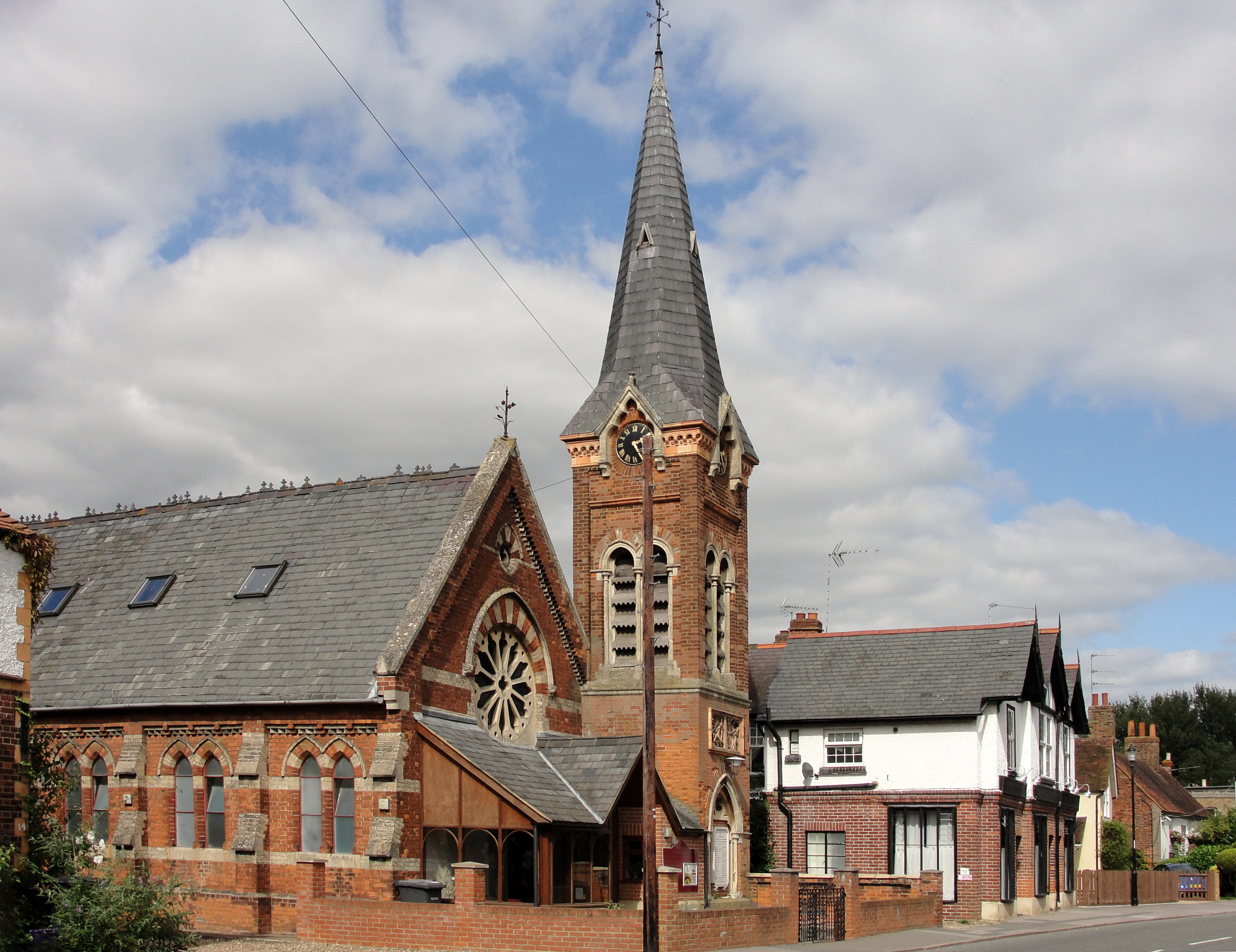
Wraysbury Baptist Chapel

Wraysbury Baptist Chapel is in the village of Wraysbury, Berkshire, England. The present day building was opened in 1862, but the chapel was first established in 1827.

== History ==
The current chapel was opened in 1862. The Baptist mission in Wraysbury can be traced back 35 years earlier to the sole efforts of the chapel's first Pastor, William Thomas Buckland. Born and raised in Wraysbury, Buckland lived for several years in Holborn Bridge and Hammersmith, where he first joined the Baptist Church. On his return to Wraysbury in 1826, he found the moral and spiritual condition of the villagers to be in a deplorable state. The only place of worship was the parish church, the vicar of which resided at a distance.

Extracts from Buckland's diary, reproduced in The Baptist Magazine, detail how he first rented a house for meetings, and invited local ministers, Mr Hall from Poyle and Mr Hawson from Staines, to preach on alternate Sundays. The first meeting was held on 20 May 1827 and in March, William opened the Sunday school to teach the local children. With ever increasing numbers, a new chapel was built and opening on 23 September 1830.

The Baptist mission continued to flourish, and 'wishing to provide more commodious and beautiful accommodation', the old chapel was knocked down and a new one erected with a convenient schoolroom attached. The work cost £800 and was covered by donations within the year.

Previously, Wraysbury had been regarded as an offshoot from Staines, but in December 1868, it decided that it was to become a station in its own right. Buckland was unanimously chosen to be its first pastor, a role he retained until his death in 1870. Others who became pastors included Arthur Shorrock, who married a relative of William Buckland.

== Today's Baptists ==
Wraysbury Baptist Church was a member of Wraysbury and Horton Churches Together, along with St Andrew's, Wraysbury and St Michael's, Horton, until it closed in 2019. The last minister was the Rev. Carolyn Urwin who served from 2006 to 2019. The Parish Council purchased the chapel building and it is now used as a Community Hub.
