= Thought Leader =

South African news and opinion platform

- Website type: News and opinion portal
- Owner: Mail & Guardian
- Creator: Matthew Buckland (Founder)
- Website: thoughtleader.co.za
- Commercial: No
- Registration: Required for commenting
- Launched: 2007; 19 years ago
- Current status: Inactive since circa 2022

Thought Leader is a collaborative news and opinion platform owned by the South African newspaper Mail & Guardian. Founded in 2007 by Matthew Buckland, who headed the Mail & Guardian's online division, the platform was part of a broader strategy to establish the newspaper's digital presence.

The platform became known for its commentary and analysis. In December 2007, it sponsored the first South African blogger, Ndumiso Ngcobo, to be officially accredited to cover a major political event, the ANC national conference in Polokwane. The move was described as a "watershed event for media" in the country.

In 2010, a study by the Tshwaranang Legal Advocacy Centre on the reporting of sexual violence in South Africa identified Thought Leader as the forum where the "most analytic discussion of sexual violence" was taking place.

Activity on the platform significantly declined around 2022, with the last articles on the main site dating to March of that year.

== Awards and recognition ==
In 2008, Thought Leader was named a Webby Award Honoree, placing it in the top 15% of the 8,000 entries submitted. The platform was honored in the political blog category alongside publications such as The New Yorker, The New York Times, and CNN.

That same year, the platform won multiple awards at the SA Blog Awards, including "South African Blog of the Year" and "Best Blog About Politics". Upon receiving the awards, founder Matthew Buckland stated, "It's an award for all our very special Thought Leader contributors and readers who have contributed more than 3 million words to the site over the past six months of the site's short existence."

== Editorial changes ==
In 2011, under editor Aliki Karasaridis, the website underwent a major redesign, its first since launching in 2007.

== Notable contributors ==
- Richard Calland
- Andrea Mitchell
- Anton Harber
- Brendan O'Neill
- Bruce Cohen
- Erik Hersman
- Jonathan Berger
- Khadija Sharife
- Marius Redelinghuys
- Matthew Buckland
- Na'eem Jeenah
- Patricia de Lille
- Pierre de Vos
- Sarah Britten
- Sheila Camerer
- Steven Friedman
- Trevor Ncube
