= Sphere (website) =

Sphere was a blog search engine. The Sphere search engine delivered blog posts based on algorithms that combine semantic matching with authority factors to deliver results relevant to the search query.

Sphere also organized bloggers by topic.

The company produced an application called Sphere It! allowing users to seek blog posts related to news articles based on the contents of a particular web page they're viewing. The function was accessed from a browser navigation bar plug-in. Upon clicking the plug-in button, a semantic analysis was performed on the text within the page and blog posts related to the text of the article were returned. The search engine required that JavaScript is turned on in the visitor's browser.

Sphere had a variety of content distribution venues among major publishers where blog results from Sphere were presented, contextually, within news stories or other content.

Sphere was founded by Tony Conrad, CEO, Martin Remy, CTO, Steve Nieker, CIO and Toni Schneider, Advisor. The company was based in San Francisco, CA.

In April, 2008, Sphere was acquired by AOL to be operated as a wholly owned subsidiary.

In 2010, Sphere was merged into AOL News.

== See also ==
- Bloglines
- Technorati
