= Matthew Buckland =

South African businessman (1974–2019)

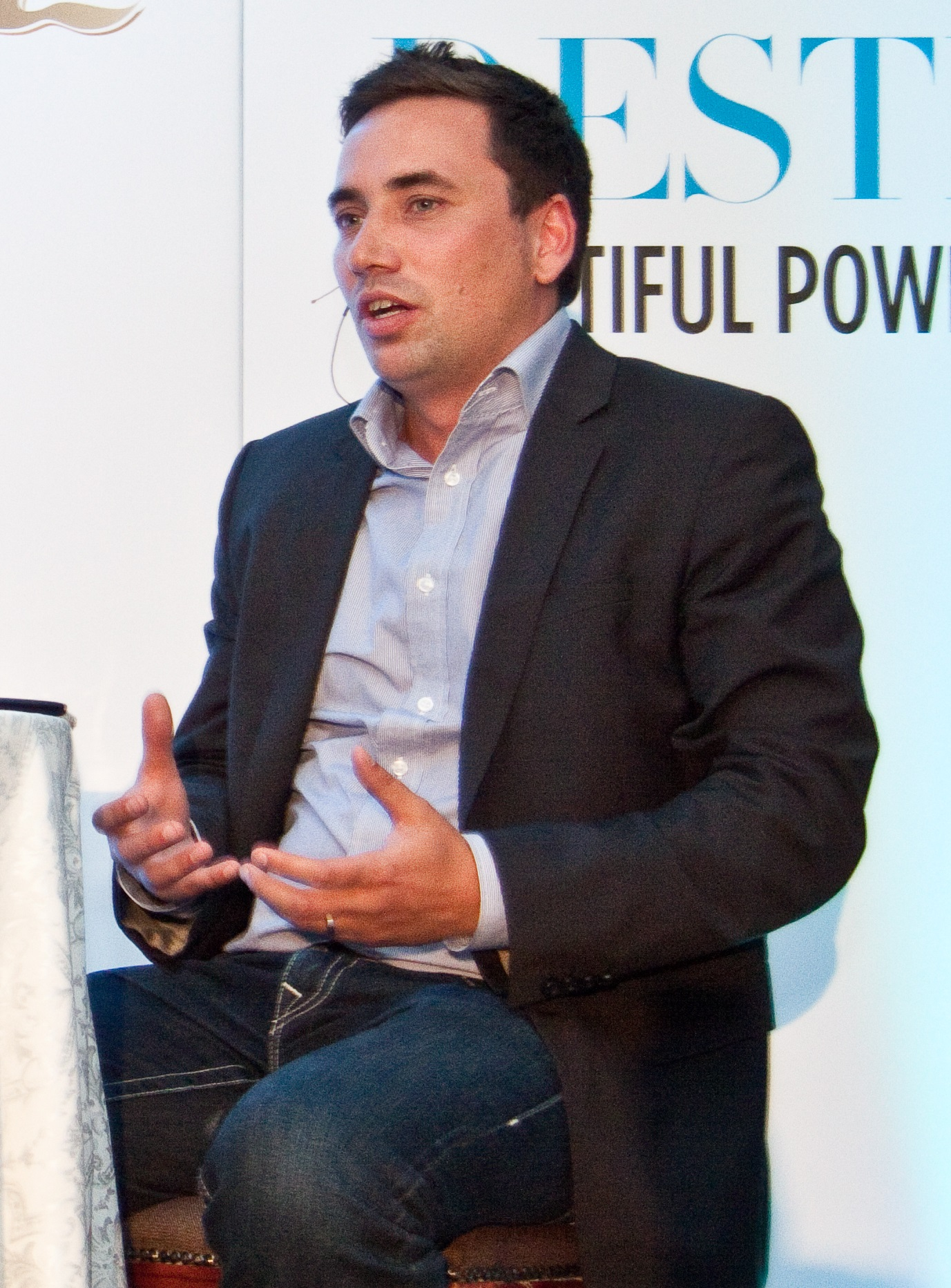
- Matthew Buckland
- Born: Matthew James Buckland; 22 August 1974; South Africa
- Died: 23 April 2019 (aged 44)
- Education: Rhodes University
- Occupation: Internet entrepreneur
- Title: Founder and MD of Creative Spark
- Term: 2010–2019
- Board member of: Silicon Cape Initiative; Creative Commons; OPA/DMMA/iAB; Cognition
- Children: 2
- Father: Andrew Buckland
- Awards: Selected Fast Company Magazine's Most Creative People in Business (2015), Destiny Magazine: Power of 40: 40 entrepreneurs under 40 (2011), Top 100 "South Africa’s most influential media and advertising people" by The Annual (2009)
- Website: Company website Memeburn.com/Burn Media; Personal weblog

Matthew Buckland (22 August 1974 – 23 April 2019) was a South African Internet entrepreneur and businessman who founded and exited a digital agency and publisher Creative Spark, acquired in 2015 by UK firm M&C Saatchi PLC (LSE: SAA), the holding group of M&C Saatchi. Buckland was also the founder of Burn Media, a suite of technology publishing brands which includes Memeburn, Ventureburn.com, Gearburn.com and others.

Buckland previously headed the online division of the Mail & Guardian, thereafter he started 20fourlabs at Naspers' news24.com, the largest South African online news publisher, owned by Naspers. While at the Mail & Guardian Buckland founded Thought Leader.

In 2015 he was selected as a "Master of Digital", sitting down with actor Idris Elba for a "Q&A Session".

Buckland lived in Cape Town with his wife and two daughters.

== Early life ==
Buckland studied journalism at Rhodes University in the Eastern Cape, South Africa. He worked in London for the BBC's then-commercial web arm, beeb.com as a developer, and then a web development producer. He then later worked as the Internet editor for the prime-time TV show, Carte Blanche, before becoming Managing Director of Mail & Guardian's online division. He was the eldest son of Andrew Buckland and Janet Buckland, a prominent South African acting family.

== Entrepreneurship ==
Buckland co-founded Amatomu in 2007, and in 2010, Creative Spark and Burn Media, which he funded himself after being unable to raise venture capital for it. Five years later, in 2015, he sold a majority share in his company to the FTSE-listed agency, M&C Saatchi. The deal included the sale of both the digital agency and the publishing arm, which owns titles such as Memeburn and Ventureburn. He later retook control of the publishing arm when exiting his former company in 2018. Ventureburn is a site that reports on the startup, entrepreneur and investor ecosystems in South Africa, Kenya and Nigeria.

He was the Master of Ceremonies at the Silicon Cape Initiative launch event and was elected to its inaugural board. The Silicon Cape Initiative is a South African-based organization which aims to turn the Western Cape into a high-tech startup hub. Buckland credits this organisation for inspiring him to move out of the corporate world into entrepreneurship.

In 2012, Buckland was recognised in the Power of 40: 40 Entrepreneurs Under 40 "Doing Interesting Things"

In 2013 and 2014, he was a member of the Cape Town chapter of the Entrepreneurs Organisation.

== Awards ==
Buckland’s industry accolades include:

- Selected in Fast Company Magazine's Most Creative People in Business, 2015
- Selected as an "Oude Meeste Master of digital", sitting down for an onscreen discussion with well-known actor Idris Elba, 2015
- Startup judge/Dragon at Social Media Week: Johannesburg
- NextWeb Startup World – Cape Town – Startup Judge
- Standard Bank Sikuvile journalism awards – Judge
- Listed in Destiny Magazine: Power of 40: 40 entrepreneurs under 40 doing interesting things
- Selected for the Old Mutual "Do Great Things" Entrepreneur guide
- Afridoctor app wins Nokia's Africa-wide innovators competition (Prize of US$80 000)
- Named in top 100 of "South Africa's most influential media and advertising people" by The Annual
- Named as one of "300 Young South Africans you should take out to lunch" by the Mail & Guardian Newspaper
- Named an upcoming New Media "Mogul" by FHM magazine & nominated for the 2009 Men's Health "Best Man" awards

== Death ==
Buckland died in April 2019 of cancer. He is survived by his wife and two daughters.
