= Memeburn =

- Website type: Technology news and analysis
- Available in: English
- Headquarters: Cape Town, South Africa
- Owner: Burn Media Group
- Creator: Matthew Buckland
- Editor: Megan Ellis
- Website: Memeburn.com
- Commercial: Yes
- Launched: April 1, 2010
- Current status: Active

Memeburn is a website that focuses on digital news and events in the emerging markets sphere. Founded by South African entrepreneur Matthew Buckland, the Cape Town-based website focuses on current events in the world of social media, mobile and general technology, and has featured interviews with the likes of WordPress co-founder and Automattic CEO Matt Mullenweg, Foursquare founder Dennis Crowley, Evernote CEO Phil Libin, the co-creator of Google Now and entrepreneur Richard Branson as well Naspers CEO Koos Bekker, Wired founder Chris Anderson and Stumbleupon CEO Mark Bartels. It is particularly interested in the BRICS, as well as digital innovation, viral online marketing campaigns and general tech trends.

== Editorial expansion ==
In 2011, Memeburn expanded to launch Gearburn.com, a sister site which is focused on gadget and game reviews and news and Motorburn.com, which focuses on car news. In 2012, Ventureburn.com was created to focus on entrepreneurship and startups. The sites were rebranded collectively in 2013 as Burn Media.

In 2019, the sites underwent a redesign, with the Memeburn, Gearburn, and Motorburn sites operating under the Memeburn.com domain. Ventureburn.com continues to operate as a sister site. Both brands—Memeburn and Ventureburn—operate under the Burn Media Group brand.

== Awards ==
In 2010, Memeburn was awarded the UCT Graduate School of Business' Best Blog award at the South African Blog Awards, and later won a bronze award for Specialist Publisher Site at the Bookmark Awards.
