= Andrew Buckland (playwright) =

South African playwright and performer (born 1954)

- Born: 4 February 1954 (age 72); Zimbabwe
- Education: Rhodes University
- Occupations: Playwright, performer, film director, mime, academic
- Spouse: Janet Buckland
- Children: Daniel Buckland; Matthew Buckland

Andrew Frederick Buckland (born 4 February 1954) is a South African award-winning playwright, performer, film director, mime, and academic.

== Biography ==
Born and schooled in Zimbabwe. He is married to actress Janet Buckland. Their son Daniel Buckland is also an actor; another son, Matthew was an Internet entrepreneur and businessman who died in 2019.

=== Training ===
Buckland trained at Rhodes University, graduating in 1979 with a BA Honours in Drama.

=== Career ===
Buckland became a junior lecturer, then joined the Performing Arts Council of the Transvaal (PACT) (1980-1984) as actor. In 1992, Buckland became a member of the First Physical Theatre Company and a lecturer in the Drama Department at Rhodes University. Later senior lecturer and finally professor, Buckland retired from Rhodes University in December 2017.

== Contribution to South African theatre ==
For PACT he played in, inter alia, Cat on a Hot Tin Roof, The Importance of Being Earnest (1982), Savages, Tom Jones and Bloed in die Strate (by Harry Kalmer), Who's Afraid of Virginia Woolf? (1984).

Performed in Romeo and Juliet (as “Tybalt” with CAPAB), Monday After the Miracle (as “John Macy” with PACT), Shrivings (as “David” with PACT), The Runner Stumbles (Pieter Toerien).

Andrew gradually began to create his own theatre works (including The Mime, Stillborn and Matches) and in 1987 he and Janet Buckland founded Mouthpeace Theatre in Johannesburg (moving it to Grahamstown in 1992), working closely with their friends Lionel Newton, and director Lara Foot-Newton.

He created a distinctive style of theatre for himself, utilizing the techniques of physical theatre and mime to relate his poetic fantasies. Among his best known works are Touchstones (1984), Pas de Deux, which he had co-written with Soli Philander (1986), the much-admired and multiple award-winning The Ugly Noonoo (1988/1989), Between the Teeth (1990), Bloodstream (with Lionel Newton - 1992), Feedback (also with Newton, 1995), Noisy Walk (1996), The Water Juggler /The Well Being (1998), and **** (2001). Laugh the Buffalo (2013), directed by Janet Buckland; the ghost of Christmas Present in Scrooge (Baxter Theatre, 2013); 2014: Crazy in Love (with A Conspiracy of Clowns)

His The Investigation of an Ugly Noo Noo was staged at the Warehouse in 1988. Touchstones, 1984, Grahamstown Festival. The Ugly Noo Noo: A Trilogy, Market Theatre, 1989. The Inconvenience of Wings by Lara Foot in 2016, Makana on the Island in 2001 at the Grahamstown Festival.

He starred in David Mamet’s Speed the Plow at Upstairs at the Market in 1990, A Doll's House at Upstairs at the Market in 1990, in a return run of The Ugly Noo Noo at the Market Theatre in 1991.

He directed Soli Philander in Philander’s Take Two at the Laager Theatre in Johannesburg in 1991.

Performed in Love for Cirque du Soleil in 2009.

He played Hamlet for the SABC in 1983.

His film work includes roles in Shotdown, The Schoolmaster, Dirty Games, The Good Fascist and Quest for Love.

== Awards ==
Awards include the Standard Bank Young Artist Awards for Drama for Pas de Deux (1986), The Scotsman Fringe Award (Edinburgh Festival - 1995) for Feedback, several Vita Awards, the Fleur de Cap Award for Best New Indigenous Script (1989).

== Sources ==
- This article was copied from Andrew Buckland at the Encyclopaedia of South African Theatre, Film, Media and Performance, which is in the public domain.
- Arndt, Susan; Breitinger, Eckhard; von Brisinski, Marek Spitczok (2007). Theatre, Performance and New Media in Africa. Breitinger. ISBN 978-3-939661-01-6.
- Blumberg, Marcia Shirley; Walder, Dennis (1999). South African Theatre As/and Intervention. Rodopi. ISBN 90-420-0547-5.
- Davis, Geoffrey V. (1994). Southern African Writing: Voyages and Explorations. Rodopi. ISBN 90-5183-599-X.
- Foot, Lara (2017). The Inconvenience of Wings. Oberon Books. ISBN 978-1-78682-268-0.
- Higginson, Craig (2012). The Jungle Book. Oberon Books. ISBN 978-1-84943-562-8.
- National Arts Festival programme, 2000. 135.
