= William Thomas Buckland =

British auctioneer

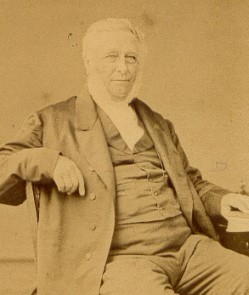
- William Thomas Buckland (1798–1870)
- Born: 5 September 1798; Wraysbury, Berkshire, England
- Died: 1 November 1870 (aged 72); Wraysbury, Berkshire, England
- Occupations: surveyor and auctioneer
- Spouse: Mary Wood
- Parent(s): Thomas Buckland and Ann Virgoe

William Thomas Buckland was born on 5 September 1798 in Wraysbury now in Berkshire, England, in the house on Longbridge Farm where he later lived, and where he died on 1 November 1870. He became an innovative surveyor and auctioneer, as well as establishing the Baptist Chapel in Wraysbury. He was married at St James's, Westminster on 25 September 1820 to Mary Wood. They had four sons and six daughters.

== Early life ==
While he was at school in Camberwell, in 1812, his father died, leaving six children, of whom he was the youngest. He left school in July of the following year. His apprenticeship, near Reading, was a 'hard bondage', of which he spoke often in remembrance of its bitterness. In 1820 he became a freeman of the City of London, and commenced business on Holborn bridge.

== Survey and Auctioneering work ==
In 1828 he founded the firm Buckland Surveyors and Auctioneers, later Messrs Buckland and Sons at Windsor. The firm expanded to include branches in Bloomsbury, Slough and Reading, and survived for over 150 years. His work originally included dealing with compensation claims for lands taken for the construction of Railways, under Private Acts of Parliament then in operation, and he was also responsible for the preparation of Tithe Award Maps, some of which can still be seen in the Centre for Buckinghamshire Studies in Aylesbury and other local libraries.

=== Slough Cattle Market ===
In September 1850, W T Buckland and his son Thomas began conducting sales of livestock in a field belonging to the North Star Inn near the Great Western Road Railway Station in Slough. They began by holding sales on the first Tuesday of every month. This soon increased to every other Tuesday then finally every Tuesday. The market continued to be run by Buckland and Sons until it finally closed in December 1988.

=== By Royal Appointment ===
One of the annual highlights for the firm was the Christmas sale of stock from the Royal Windsor Estates. Held on the same week as the Smithfield Show, buyers came from all over the country to buy something from the monarch. The sale in 1850 was held on 17 December, and included Superior Fat Heifers for £20 each; 10 fat ewes, fed by Prince Albert for 33/10; Fine Old Wether Sheep fed by the Duke of Buccleuch for 40/6. The sale made a total of £226. On 12 December 1894, Messrs Buckland & Sons were proud to announce:

The Prince Consort's Flemish Farm

A Xmas sale of fat stock belonging to HM the Queen
ON WEDNESDAY, DECEMBER 12, 1894
At One o'Clock precisely

Carriages will meet the Trains at both Windsor Stations

Despite their long association with the Royal Estates, it was more than 40 years after their founder's death, that George V granted his Royal Warrant to Messrs Buckland & Sons in November 1911.

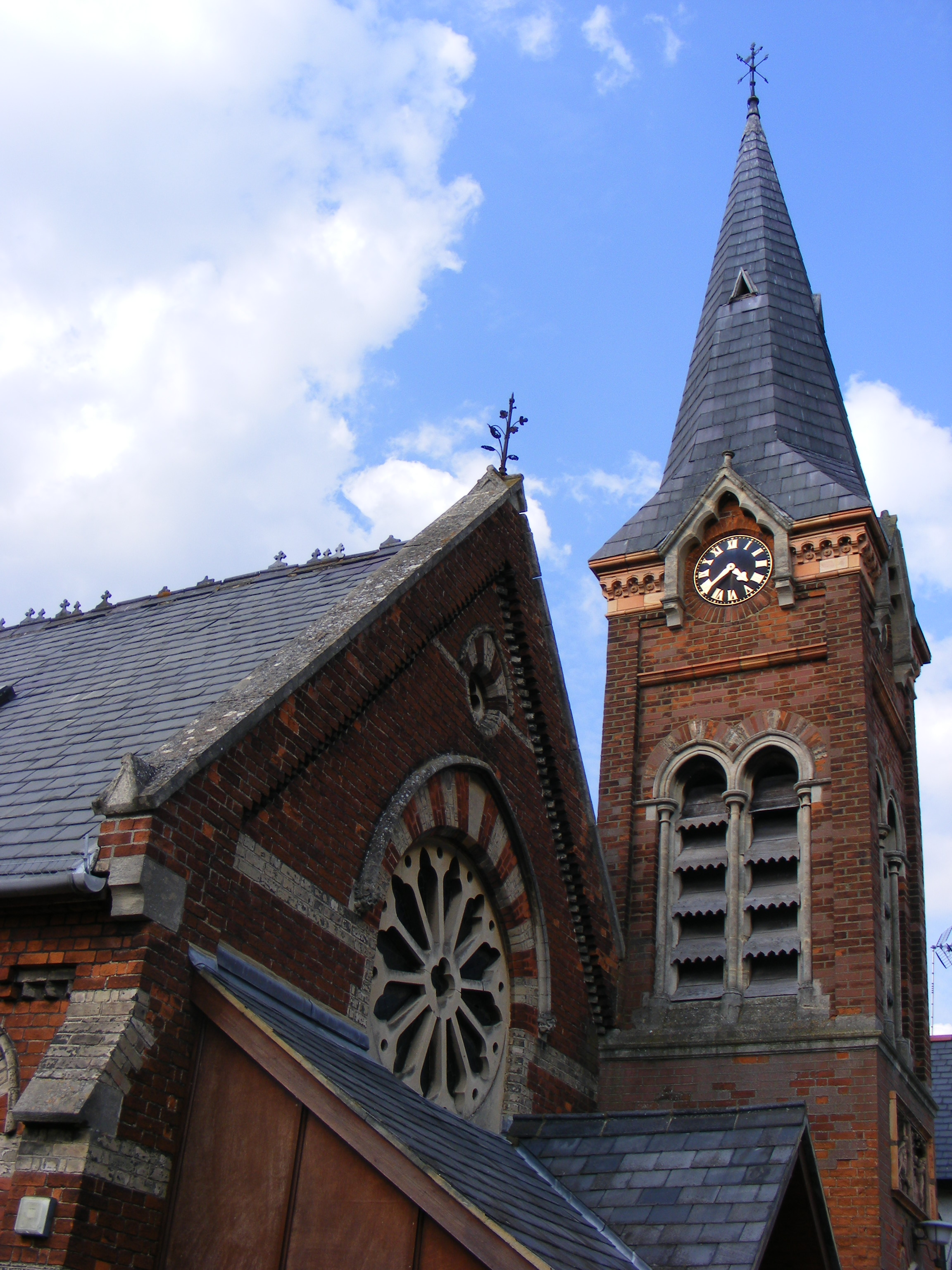
Baptist Chapel in Wraysbury

== Wraysbury Baptist Chapel ==
In 1862, G.W.J. Gyll wrote a description of William Thomas Buckland, including his role in the establishment of the Wraysbury Baptist Chapel:

A yeoman and a worthy man, useful and excellent in all the duties of life and no less famed for an agriculturist than land guager and auctioneer. ... He presides in his own chapel, a Baptist one, where he preaches fearlessly and revelations of his Heavenly Master, and enforces his doctrine by a strict moral and religious life. This service he has faithfully fulfilled for 35 years. He has visited the sick and read to them, and succoured them in their spiritual necessity, when the clergyman non-resident has been absent, and this without fee or reward, feeling that the pleasure he had in doing it paid itself; laying up for himself a treasure which neither moth nor rust can corrupt.
