= Staines Moor =

Protected area in Surrey, England

Coordinates: 51.45°N 0.515°W

- Site of Special Scientific Interest
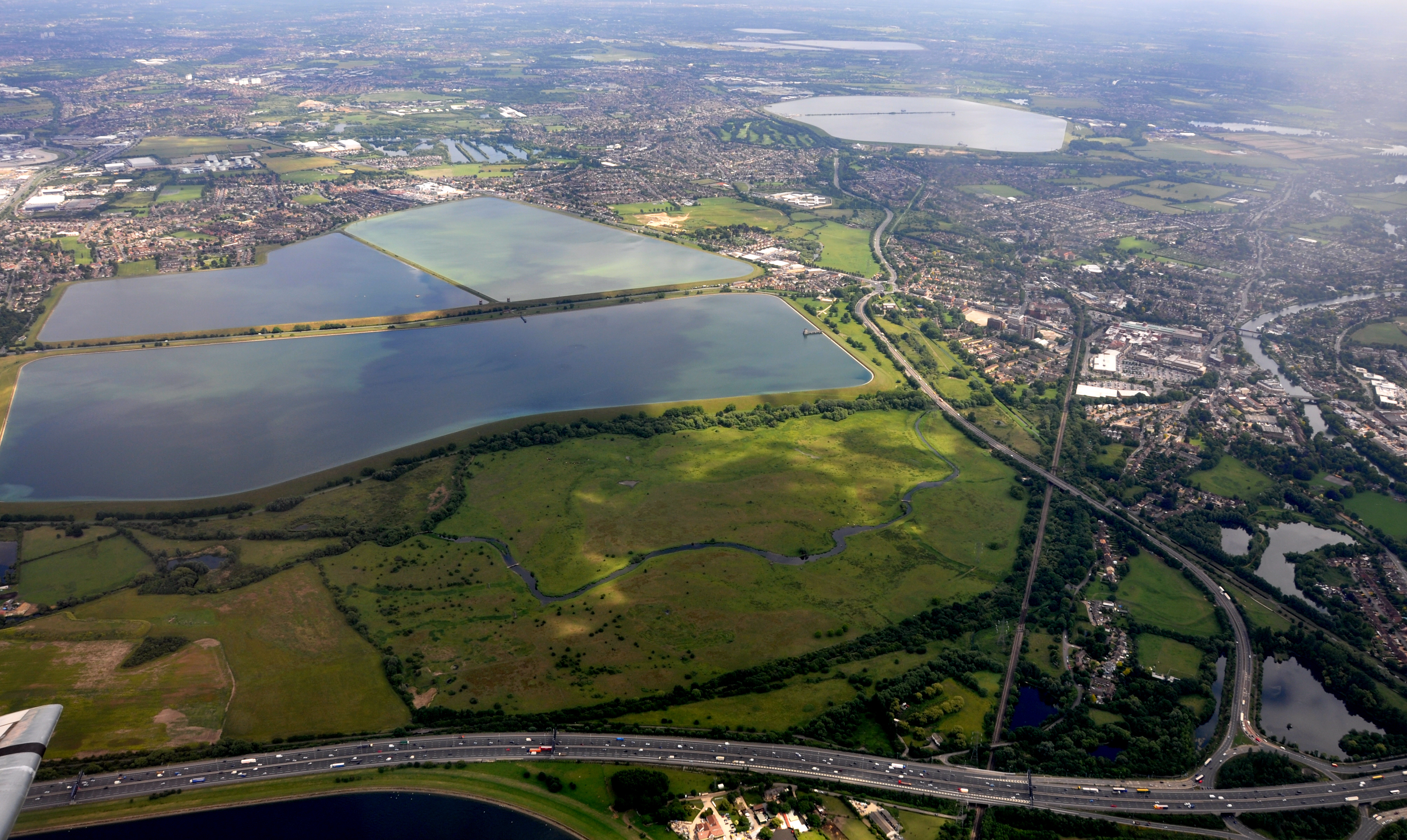
- Staines Moor in foreground with King George VI and Staines reservoirs behind.
- Location of Staines Moor.
- Area of search: Surrey
- Grid reference: TQ 043 731
- Interest: Biological
- Area: 510.8 hectares (1,262 acres)
- Notification date: 1984
- Location map: Magic Map

Staines Moor is a 510.8-hectare (1,262-acre) biological Site of Special Scientific Interest north of Staines-upon-Thames in Surrey. It is part of the South West London Waterbodies Ramsar site and a Special Protection Area

== Description ==
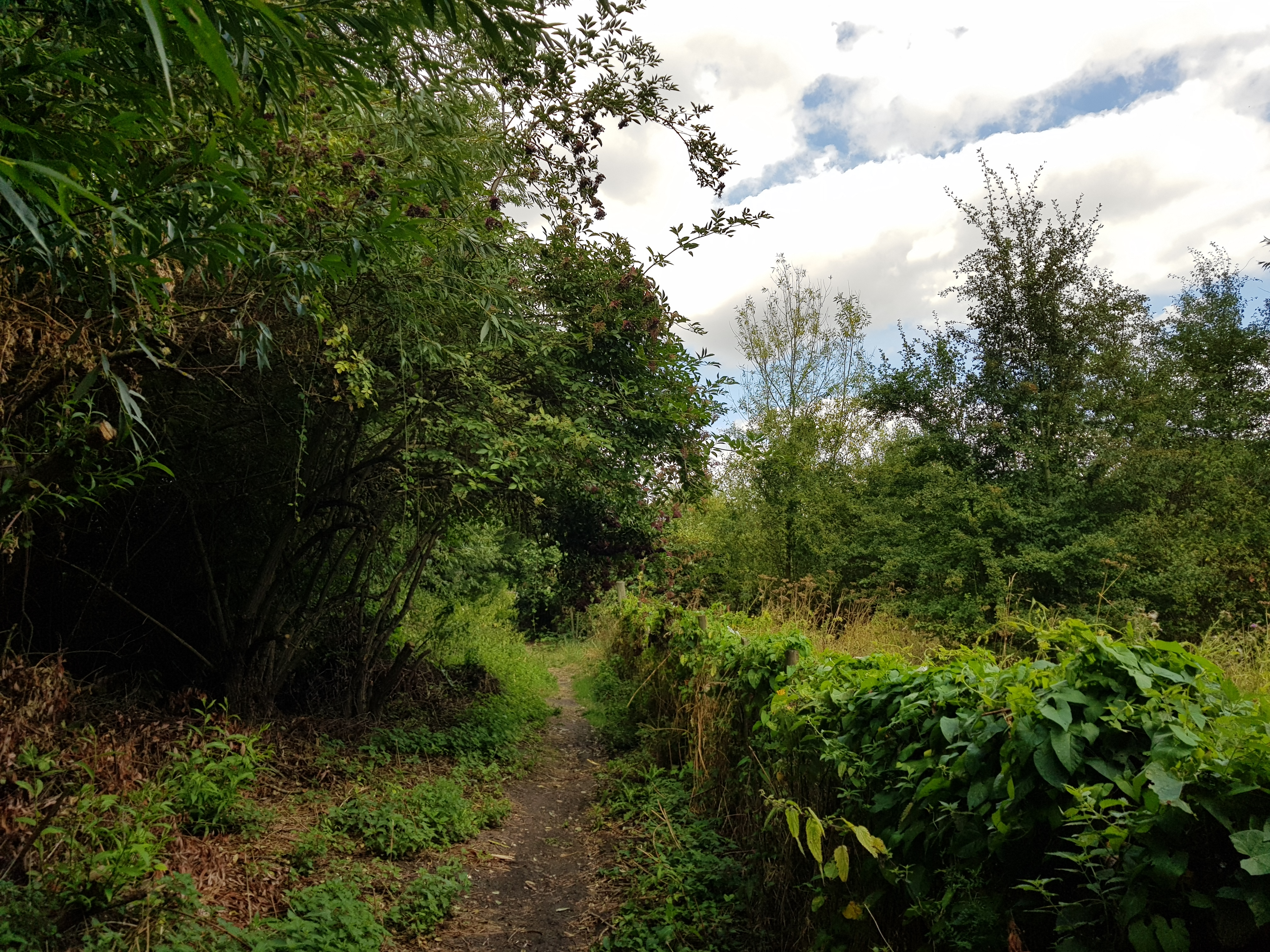
A path across the moor

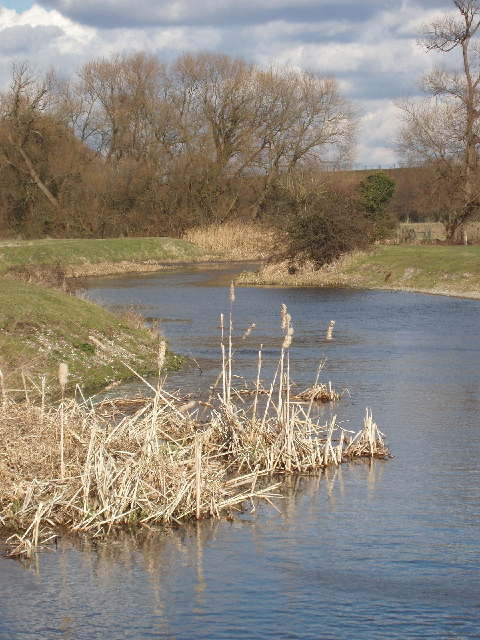
The Colne and bulrushes

Staines Moor consists of alluvial flood meadows, the King George VI Reservoir, the Staines Reservoirs and a stretch of the River Colne. Three of the six main distributaries of the River Colne run southward through it. The moor consists of rich alluvial soil on a bed of clay, a soil which is much more thick and naturally fertile compared with most of the patchy humus in the topsoil in the large historic parishes to the east such as Ashford, Stanwell, Harmondsworth, Bedfont and Feltham, which have thin, less moist humus on gravel-rich clay, formed by the ancient terraces of the Thames in the same way as the inland parts of the riverside parishes. As such rich pasture is the primary use of the land. Meads would be a more accurate term, as moor implies stony land or waste (infertile land). In the far south of the area mill mead was between two stream channels of the river, where the shopping centre Two Rivers has been built.

The Staines Moor SSSI also includes King George VI Reservoir which is to the east. The reservoir carries nationally important wintering populations of tufted ducks, pochard, goosander and common goldeneye. The moor is separated from Wraysbury Reservoir to the west by the M25 and a footpath-accessible viaduct once used by the short-lived Staines and West Drayton Railway.

== History ==
The moor has been common land since 1065, and anyone owning grazing animals who registers with the local authority is entitled to graze stock on it. The traditional limit of livestock a person could leave to graze on the common was one horse and two cattle per head. Formerly the commoners were any people who lived in the parish of Staines, which since the mid-20th century has had three Church of England churches, whereas before the mid-19th century it had just one church. The part of the moor north of the A30 is indivisible from Stanwell Moor's remaining moor occupying most of that late 20th-century small village, which was before then a hamlet.

Its land covering 510.8 acres (2 km^{2}) has been more than half turned to water by the King George VI Reservoir covering, including its banks, 350 acres (1.4 km^{2}). Minor losses have taken belts of land on its western edge and in its southern third due to the M25 and A30 dual carriageway.

Open fields in the open field system by it were west of Moor Lane, today properties and smallholdings off Wraysbury Road. This area was subject to enclosure (privatisation) by 1649. Most of the Staines fields, however, by the church and in the south of the parish, remained worked as open fields until 1845. While these two periods of privatisation occurred, the moor itself has never been subject to an Act of Enclosure and is the only common remaining mostly green space in the borough.

A rifle range was established in the 19th century and was moved to the Yeoveney land west of Moor Lane c. 1891, but it was disused by 1933.

== Land ownership and management ==
Major landowners that own land within Staines Moor SSSI include Brett Aggregates and Thames Water. Grazing activities on the moor are managed by moormasters who are elected to oversee the common land. The Association for the Preservation of Staines Moor was established in 1971 to protect the commons.

== See also ==
- Staines-upon-Thames
- Water-meadow
