= Buckinghamshire Way =

88-mile footpath in Buckinghamshire, England

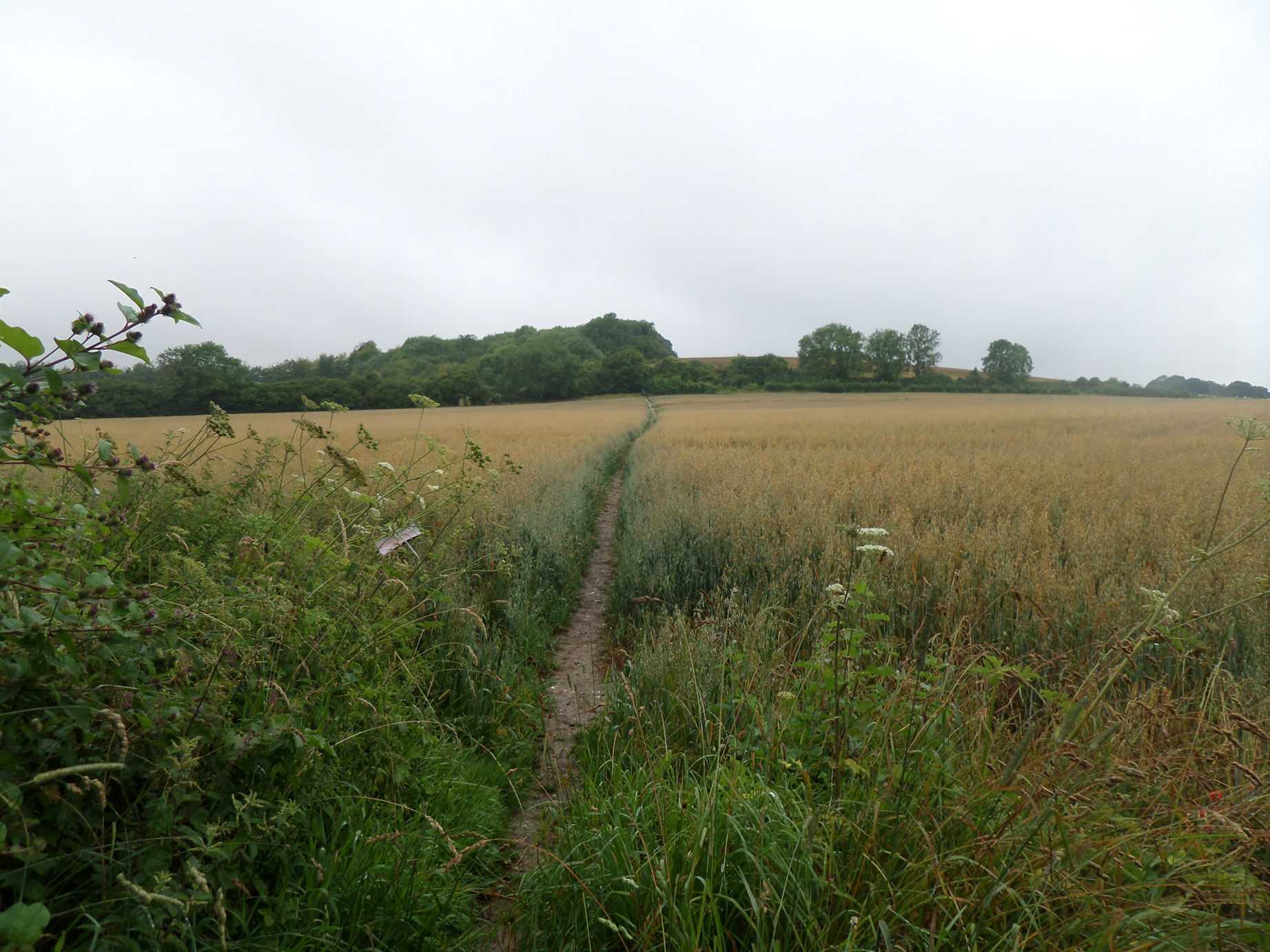
- The Buckinghamshire Way west of Great Missenden
- Length: 88 mi (142 km)
- Location: Buckinghamshire, UK
- Trailheads: West of Lammas Park and its London Stone, Staines-upon-ThamesTQ026720; Lavendon SP901561
- Use: Hiking
- Highest point: 817 feet (Pulpit Hill)
- Difficulty: Moderate

The Buckinghamshire Way is long-distance walking route along the length of Buckinghamshire; which is to say the traditional county. It was developed as a walking route in celebration of the county for the Association of British Counties.

- Southern trailhead: West of Lammas Park and its London Stone where Staines-upon-Thames meets Hythe End, WraysburyTQ026720
- Northern trailhead: Northey Farm SP901561

The route is a single route starting close to the southernmost point of the traditional county in Hythe End and finishing at the northern limit of Lavendon. It is 88 miles (142 km) and was first walked in 2019, taking four days, leisurely.

Sites on or close to the path include the Ankerwycke Meadow, Eton College, Cliveden, the Chequers Estate, Waddesdon Manor, the Quainton Windmill, Milton Keynes and Olney.

The walk is not currently waymarked. It incorporates sections of a number of waymarked routes, including the Thames Path, the Chiltern Way, the South Bucks Way, the North Bucks Way (extensively) and Aylesbury Outer Ring, the Midshires Way and the Grand Union Canal towpath, along with local paths.

== Gallery ==
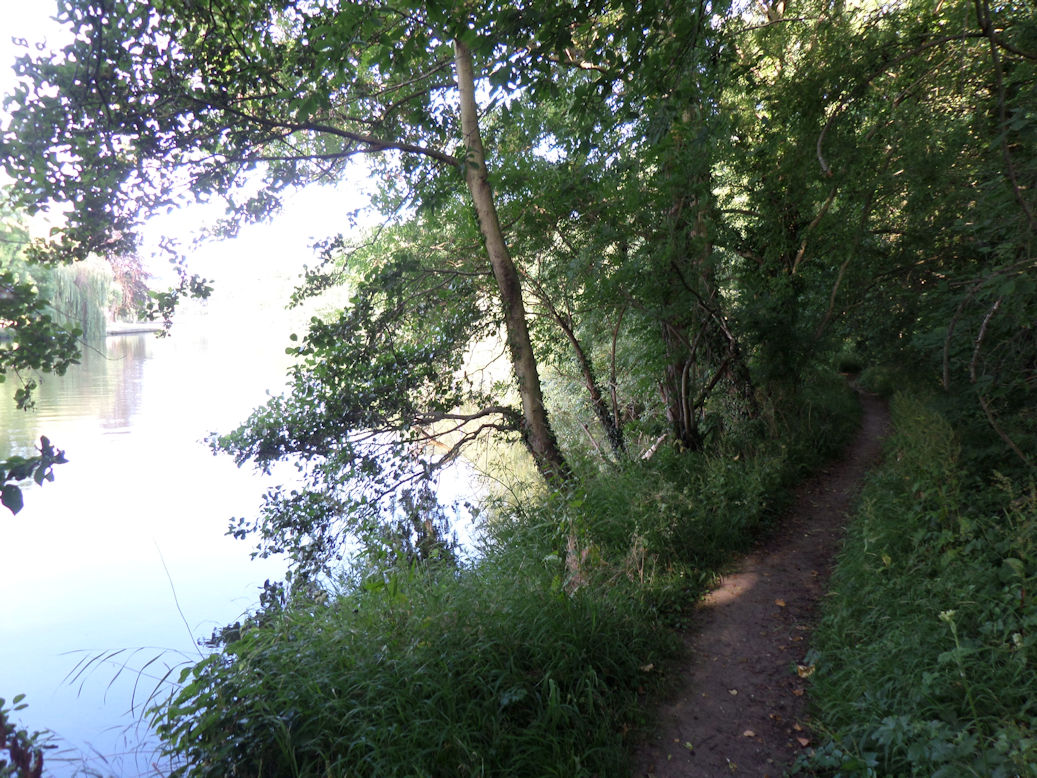
The Thames by Ankerwyck Meadow

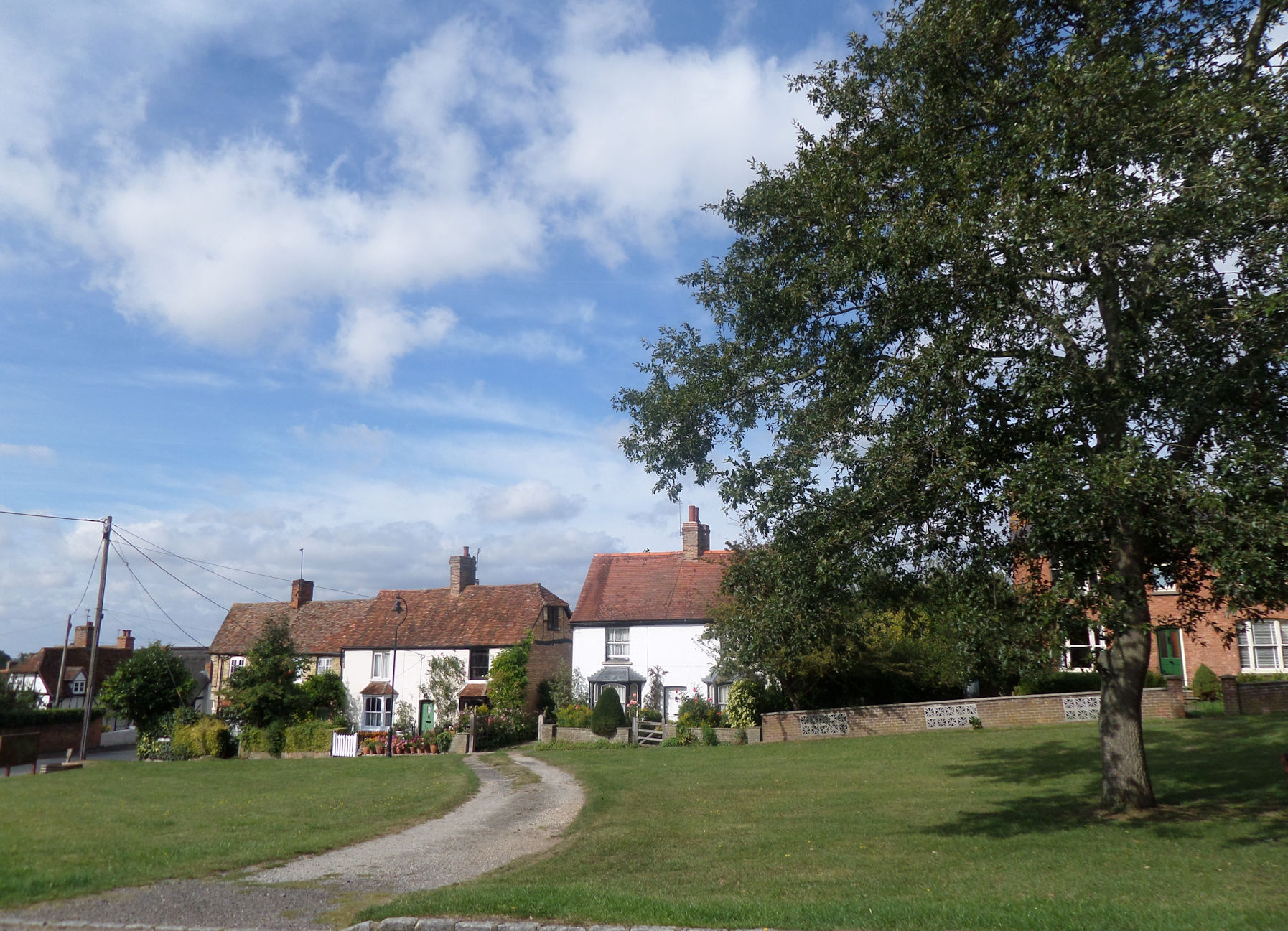
Quainton

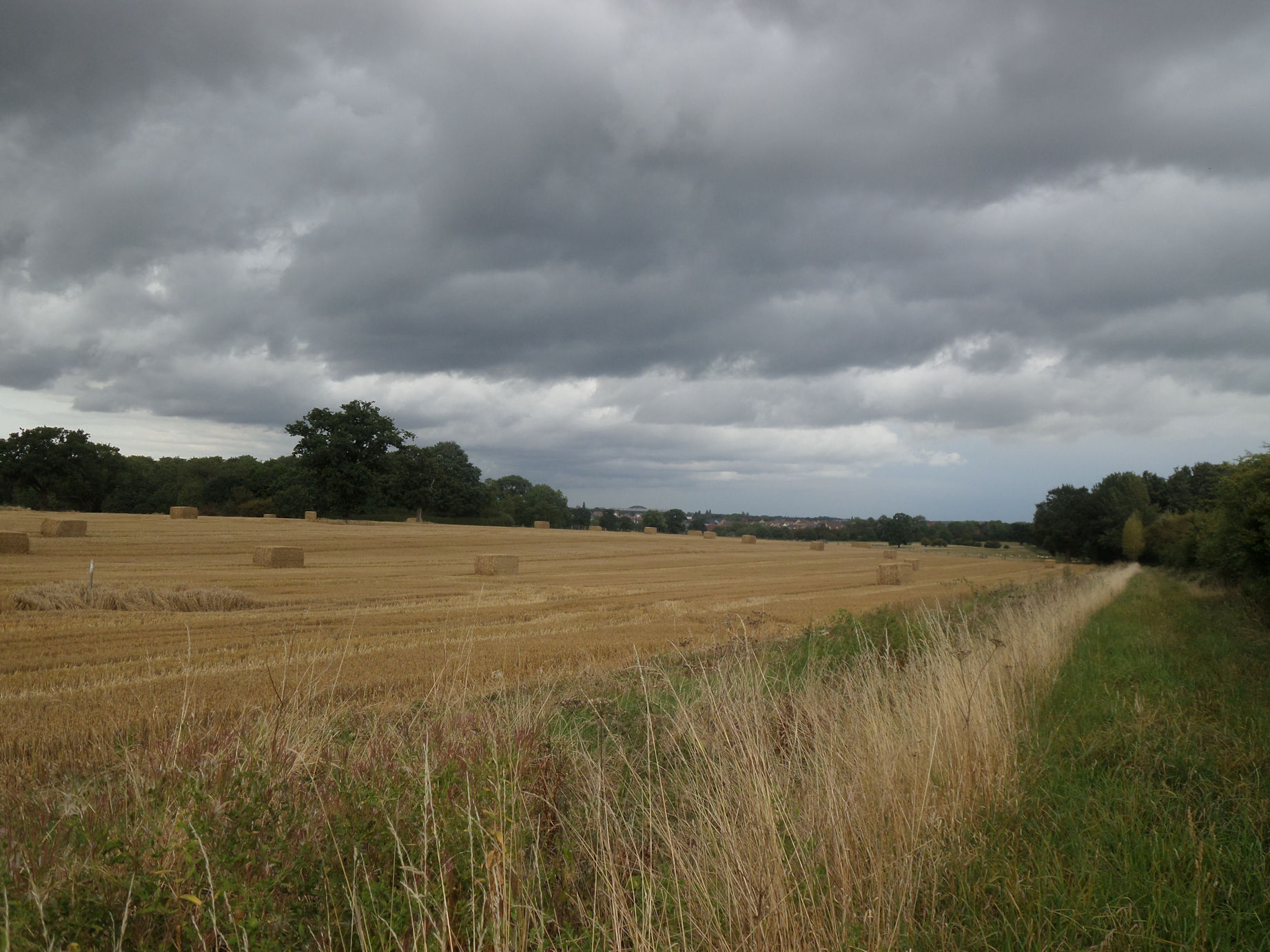
Approaching Milton Keynes

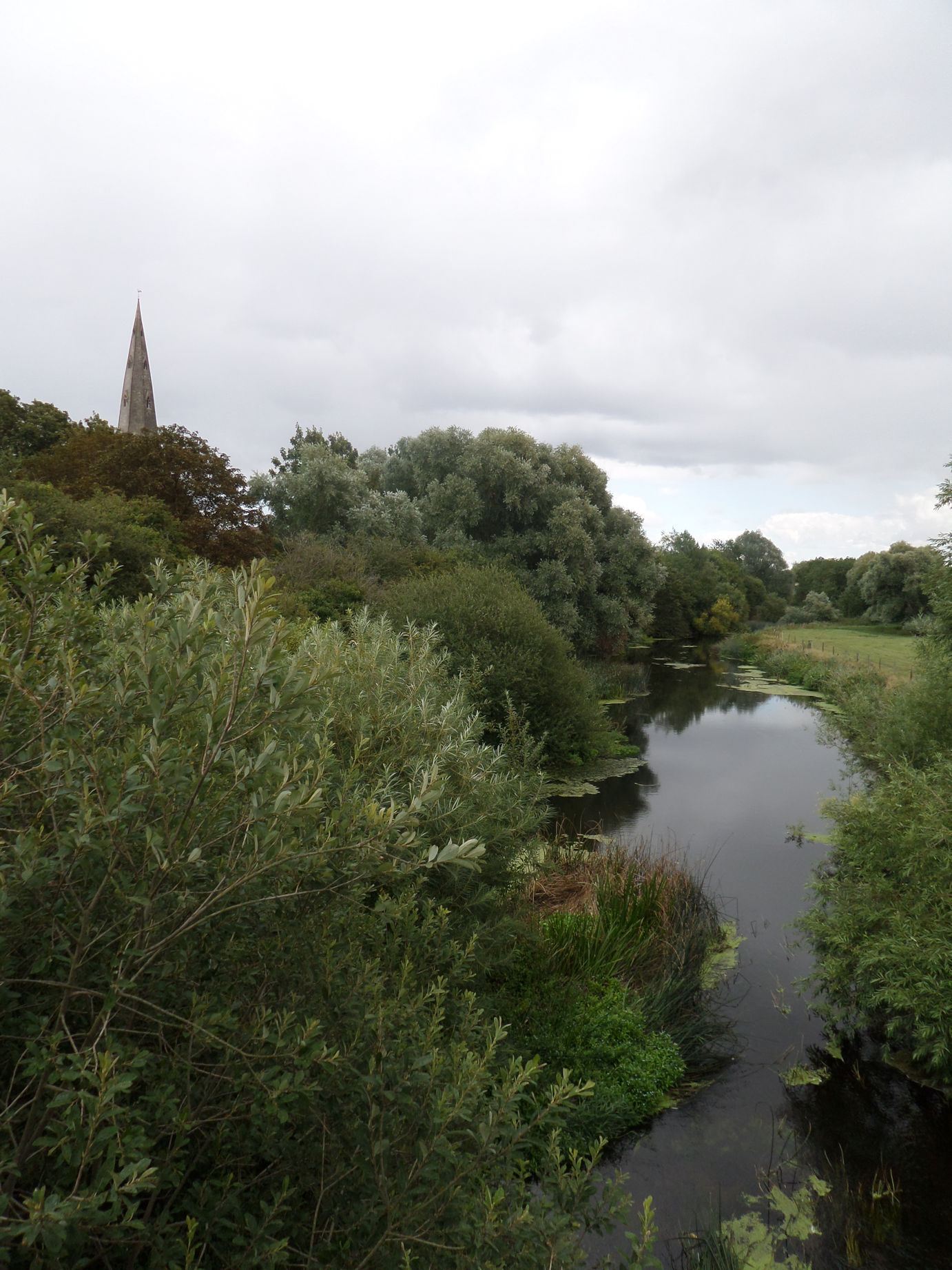
The Great Ouse at Olney
