= Wraysbury =

Village in England

Coordinates: 51°27′29″N 0°33′07″W

- Village and civil parish
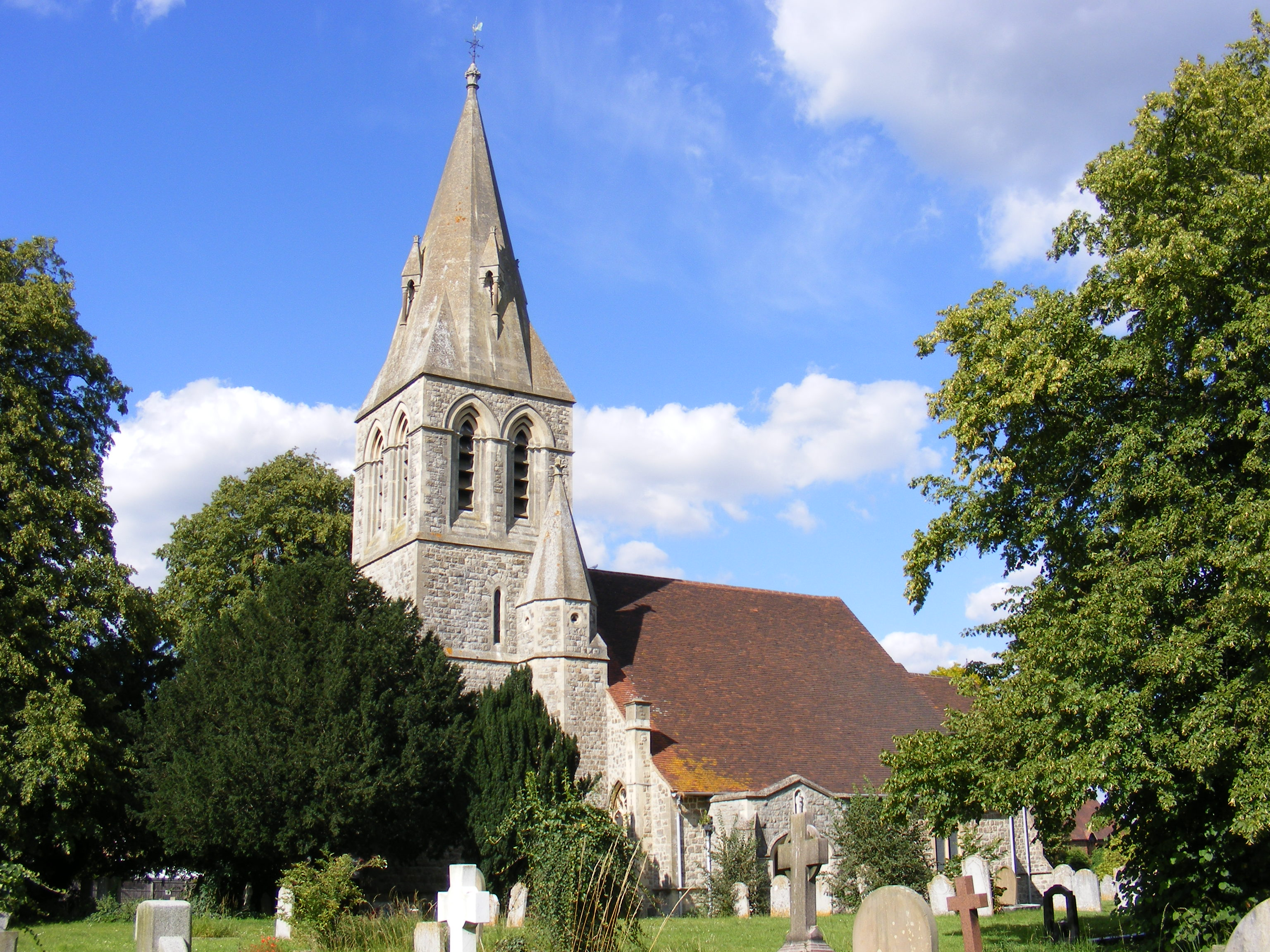
- St Andrew's parish church

- Location within Berkshire
- Population: 4,900 (2021 Census)
- OS grid reference: TQ005745
- Civil parish: Wraysbury
- Unitary authority: Windsor and Maidenhead
- Ceremonial county: Berkshire
- Region: South East
- Country: England
- Sovereign state: United Kingdom
- Post town: Staines-upon-Thames
- Postcode district: TW19
- Dialling code: 01784
- Police: Thames Valley
- Fire: Royal Berkshire
- Ambulance: South Central
- UK Parliament: Windsor

Wraysbury is a village and civil parish in the Royal Borough of Windsor and Maidenhead in England. It is under the western approach path of London Heathrow Airport. It is located on the east bank of the River Thames, roughly midway between Windsor and Staines-upon-Thames, and 18 miles (29 km) west by south-west of London. Historically part of Buckinghamshire, Wraysbury was made part of the new non-metropolitan county of Berkshire in 1974, under the Local Government Act 1972. The Wraysbury Reservoir is located to the east, administratively wholly in the Spelthorne district of Surrey (to be West Surrey from April 2027), although it was historically divided between Buckinghamshire and Middlesex.

== History ==
Investigation by Windsor and Wraysbury Archaeological Society of a field in the centre of Wraysbury to the east of St Andrew's Church revealed evidence of human activity in Neolithic times. Many hundreds of flint artefacts were found and are now in the care of the Windsor Museum collection. The village name was traditionally spelt Wyrardisbury; it is Anglo Saxon in origin and means "Wigred's fort". Its name is recorded in the Domesday Book of 1086 as Wirecesberie and as Wiredesbur in 1195. The name is seen again as Wyrardesbury in 1422.

=== Magna Carta Island and Ankerwycke ===
View of Wraysbury Lakes

Swans on Wraysbury Lakes

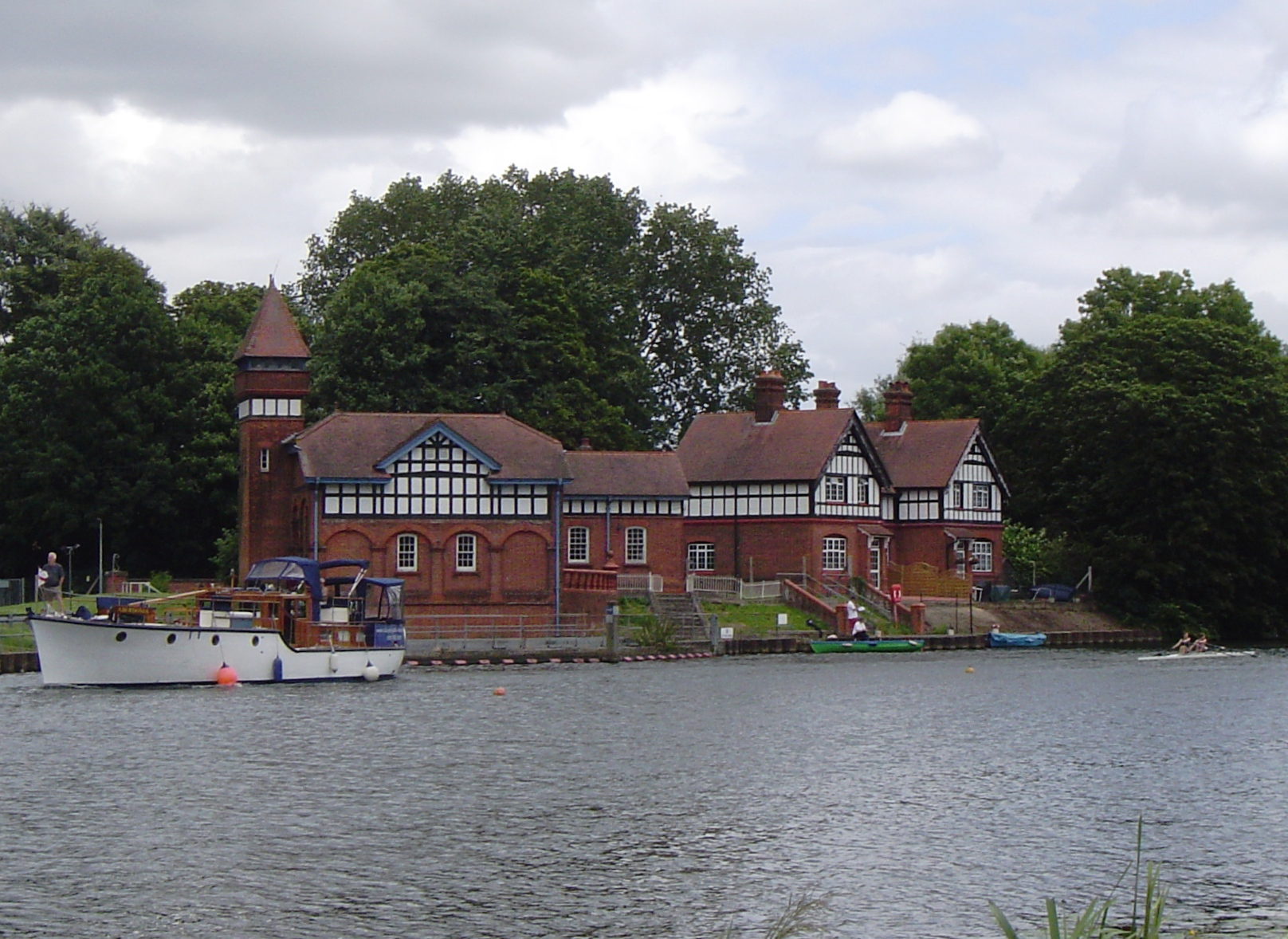
Water extract plant buildings at Hythe End

Magna Carta Island, in the parish of Wraysbury, is one of the sites traditionally suggested for the sealing of Magna Carta in 1215. On the Ankerwycke estate in the village are the ruins of Ankerwycke Priory, a Benedictine nunnery, founded in the reign of King Henry II. One of the 50 oldest trees in the United Kingdom can be found here: at around 2,000 years old, the Ankerwycke Yew dates from the Iron Age, and is so wide that you can fit a Mini Cooper behind its trunk and not see it from the other side. Local legend says that Anne Boleyn once sat under the tree, while residing at the Ankerwycke estate, but this has not been verified. Henry Stafford, 5th Baron Stafford died at Ankerwycke in 1637. The Ankerwycke estate was bought by John Blagrove, a prominent Jamaican slave owner, who did much to improve the estate.

== Wraysbury in the 19th century ==
The population of Wraysbury remained relatively static during the 19th century, with a slight increase between the 1801 return of 616 and the final census of the century which gave a population figure of 660. This compares to a population figure for Wraysbury of 3,641 in the 2001 census. For centuries, agricultural and mill work had been the principal areas of employment for the villagers; and as late as 1831, census returns show that of the 135 families in the village, 62 were employed in agriculture while 68 made their living in the mills. This compares to the most recent census in which around 12% of the population work from home and the average distance travelled to work is 14.2 kilometres (9 mi).

=== The Wraysbury enclosure ===
The enclosure of the parish of Wraysbury was ordered by a private inclosure act of 1799 and was signed by the commissioners in 1803. The map of the village was redrawn by Thomas Bainbridge and shows the distribution of the lands in the following enclosure. Immediately prior to this the common land of the village was owned by the Lord of the manor of Wraysbury, at that time John Simon Harcourt, the church and the trustees of William Gyll Esq., although, as common land, they were subject to legal rights of pasture and grazing for copyholders and other tenants. In addition to those with legal rights over the land, the poor of the district would have had 'real' or 'customary rights', for example to feed their livestock or gather wood for fuel.

The only beneficiaries from enclosure were those who could show legal rights over the common land, such as copyholders and tenants of the manor. The enclosure enshrined their rights, converting "rights of common" and allocating an area of land commensurate with their rights, as close to their farmhouse as was convenient. The poor were overlooked in this process, and were no longer allowed to forage for fuel or graze their animals. The smaller landowners of Wraysbury to benefit from enclosure included Nathanial Wilmot, Nathanial Matthews, Shadrach Trotman and Thomas Buckland, all of whose names had previously appeared on the Wraysbury Court rolls as copyhold owners.

=== Coming of the railway ===
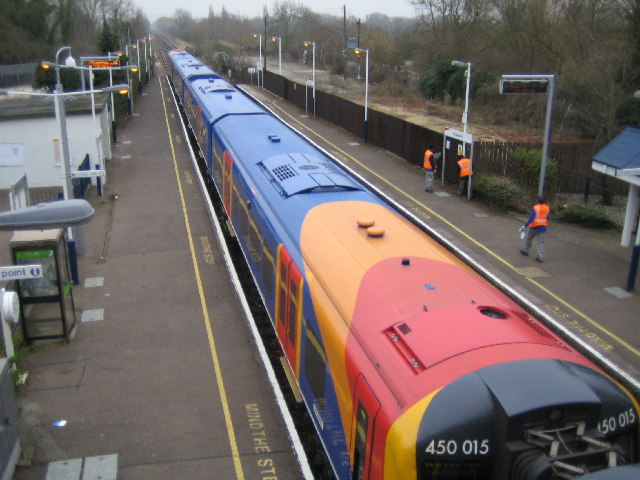
Wraysbury railway station

The village saw another major change in 1848 with the arrival of the railway, which opened up employment opportunities and afforded the chance to travel easily and quickly to and from the village. In the History of Wraysbury published in 1862, G.W.J. Gyll extolled the benefits to the village:

Railways have much improved the locality and the condition of the people also, and it is a powerful solvent to diminish provincial rusticity, local and self-importance; class prejudice and all the elements of isolation melt away in its presence. The railway through our parish has been of great use to it; has enhanced the value of property, as is the case wherever such a project has been executed, despite the fears of those who repressed the enterprise.

William Thomas Buckland was the local surveyor and valuer employed to handle the compensation claims resulting from the purchases of land for the new railway. This business of Buckland & Sons grew into an estate agency, which had an office in Windsor High Street for the following 150 years.

=== New road and suspension bridge ===
"Where is Wraysbury, I can scarce find it on the map?" asked an associate of G.W.J. Gyll. Once the railway had put the village on the map, the next steps were to improve road access, and more importantly, to alleviate the adverse effects of the frequent floods which often resulted in the village being cut off from the rest of the county. George Harcourt, Lord of the manor, suggested that a new road should be built on higher ground from Bowry's Barn to the Colne Bridge, to replace the old road which ran along ditches susceptible to flooding. The 1848 Tithe map, drawn by surveyor William Thomas Buckland showing the proposed route of the new road, can be seen at the Centre for Buckinghamshire Studies in Aylesbury. Harcourt also suggested a replacement for the old "Long Bridge" over the River Colne should be built, and a new suspension bridge, designed and paid for by Harcourt, was built by civil engineer Mr Dredge.

== Churches ==
=== Church of St Andrew ===
The parish church of St Andrew is a Gothic structure, intermediate between Norman and Early English, supposed to have been built by King John. The parish registers its date from the year 1734. William Pynchon, the founder of Springfield, Massachusetts, died in Wraysbury in 1662 and was buried at St Andrew's Church.

=== Nonconformists in Wraysbury ===
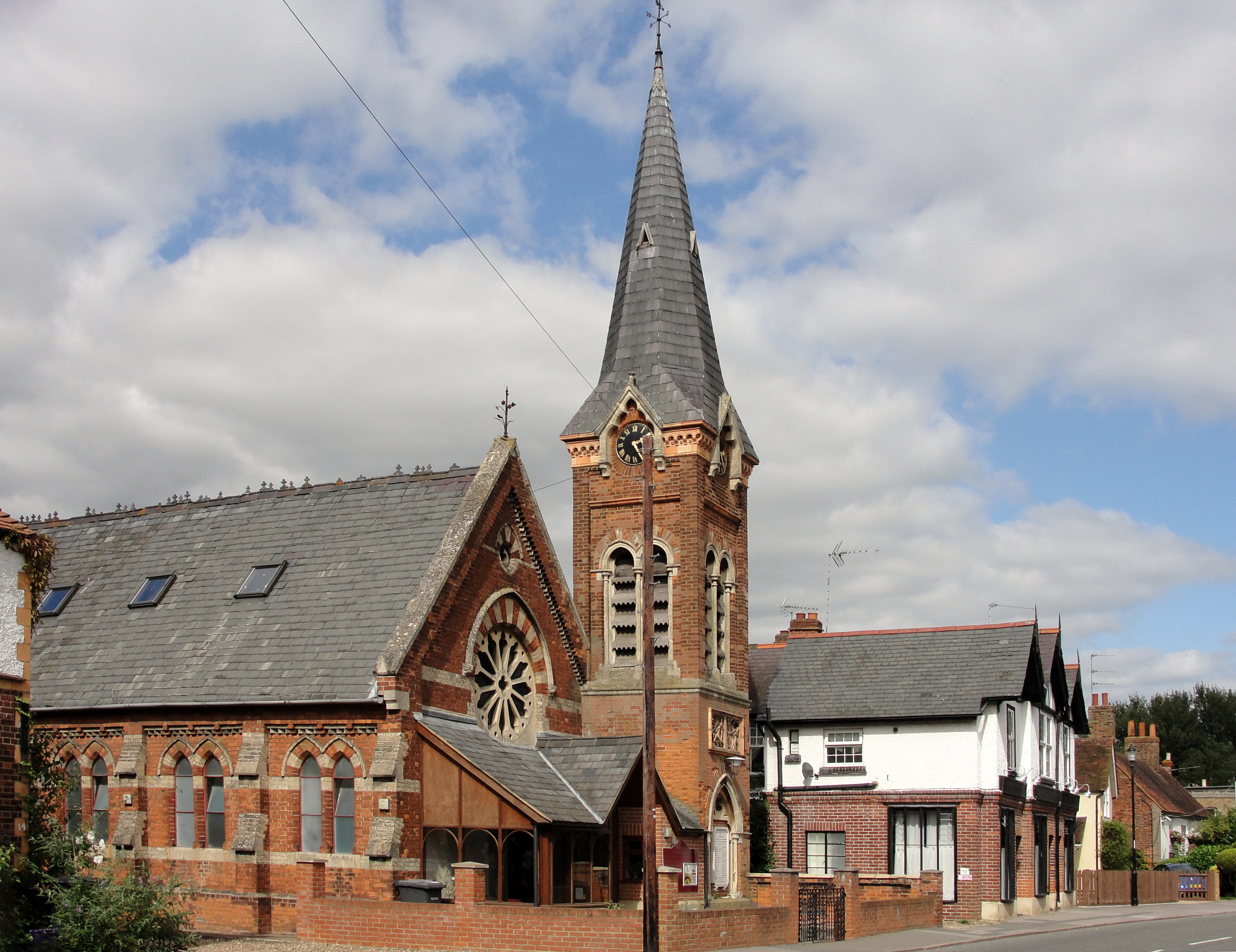
Baptist chapel in Wraysbury

The only place of worship in Wraysbury until 1827 was the Anglican church of St Andrew. Local farmer, surveyor and auctioneer William Thomas Buckland, wishing to provide an alternative place of worship for nonconformists, built the Wraysbury Baptist Chapel to his own design. The original Baptist meeting place was opened in 1827 and Buckland was the principal minister until his death some 40 years later. Gyll, in his History of Wraysbury, described the establishment of the chapel:

Much praise is to be given to the officiating, minister of the Baptists in Wraysbury, Mr. William Thomas Buckland, who exercises his vocation at the chapel here to a well disposed and confiding auditory, while to his wife and family are entrusted the religious education of the Baptist flock.

The new chapel, with its elegant slender tower, was opened on 16 October 1862; the building works had cost around £800. The striking terracotta relief panel, The City of Refuge, on the front elevation of the chapel, was created by the renowned Doulton & Co artist George Tinworth and is signed with his monogram. After Buckland's death, James Doulton, his son-in-law and a cousin of Sir Henry Doulton, took over the preaching duties. Later James' son-in-law the Reverend Arthur Gostick Shorrock took over the duties. Arthur had been a student preacher in Wraysbury in the 1880s, after which he spent 35 years as a missionary in Shaanxi, China.

== Use in film and television ==
A flooded quarry in Wraysbury was used as a filming location (actually intended to be in France) in the 1985 James Bond film A View to a Kill. Wraysbury Stores, the main village store until May 2006, appeared in an advert for the Daily Mail featuring Chris Tarrant. The stores also feature in a scene from the movie "Buster" starring Phil Collins.

== Landmarks and community ==
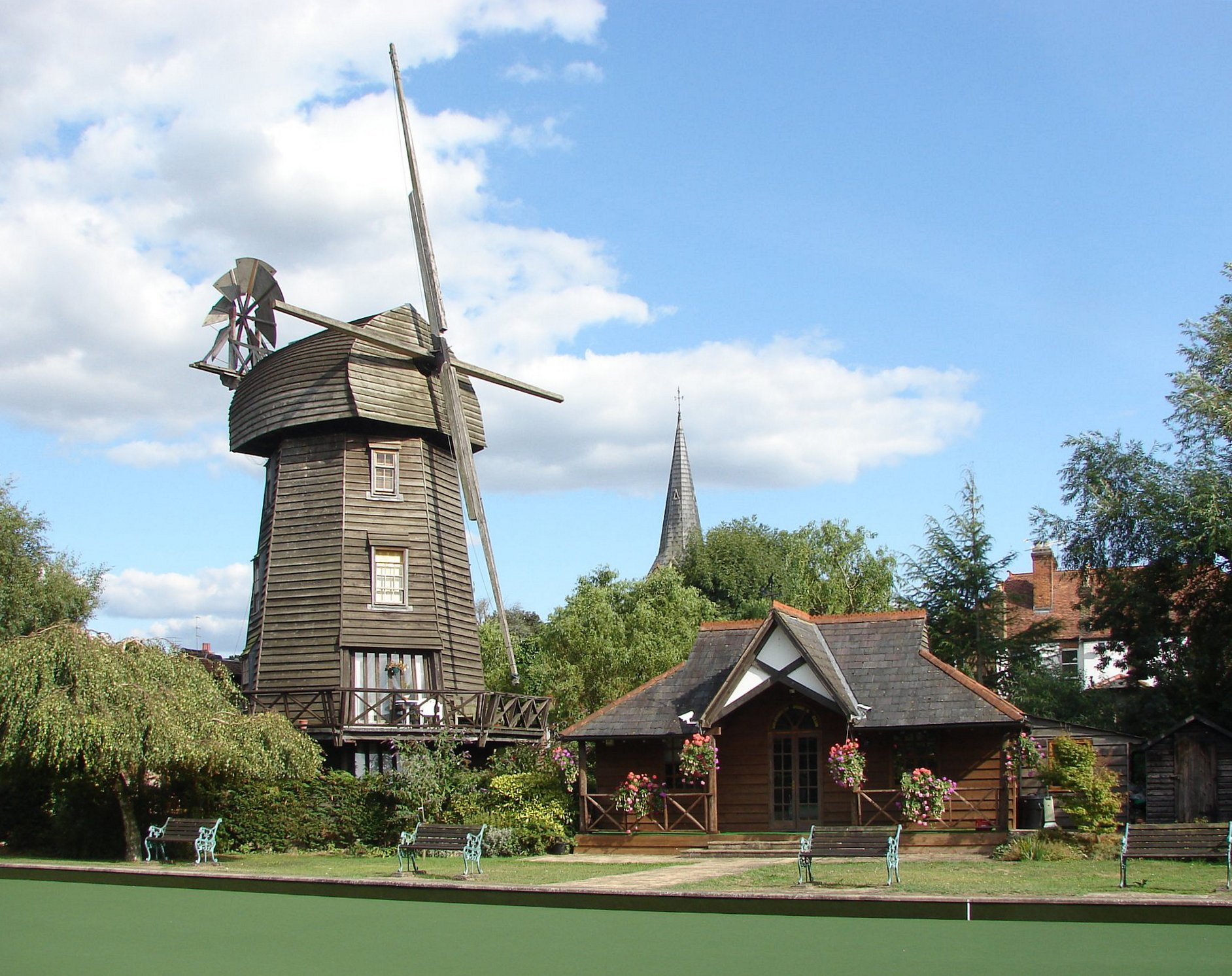
Wraysbury Mill

Due to the various gravel pits, the River Thames, lakes and reservoirs (notably "The Pond"), Wraysbury has plenty of wildlife and opportunities for walks. The village has a few Sites of Special Scientific Interest with these being Wraysbury Reservoir, Wraysbury and Hythe End Gravel Pitsand. The western part of the village, roughly between the river and the B376 road, is subject to frequent significant flooding, notably in January 2003, January 2014 and February 2014. In June, Wraysbury holds its annual fete, where stands such as the local vintage and classic car clubs show off their members' vehicles. There are also activities for children and the tug-of-war held by the scouts, beavers and cubs. There are also the stands of local charities, the local school, usually giving out ice creams, and of course the church's stands. Wraysbury Cricket Club plays on the village green and played the Marylebone Cricket Club in 2009.

Former actor Robert Rietti had a home in Wraysbury, but after his wife died in August 2008, he sold the house in 2009. Former Wraysbury resident Gordon Cullen, an architect renowned for developing the Townscape movement in post-war Britain, designed the Wraysbury Village Hall. It is one of only a few buildings he designed which were actually built. The main store in the village was Wraysbury Stores until its closure in May 2006. The building is Victorian and had been continuously occupied since the late 1800s. It was formerly a post office before becoming a general store. Its neighbours include a garage and fish and chip shop and is opposite the Perseverance pub. There are many shops located on the High Street, and there is also a park including a children's playground which is a popular spot for dog-walkers and kite-flyers. 1st Wraysbury Scouts Group is based on the village green. The village has two railway stations: Wraysbury and Sunnymeads, both on the Staines to Windsor & Eton line from Windsor to London Waterloo.

== Localities ==
=== Hythe End ===
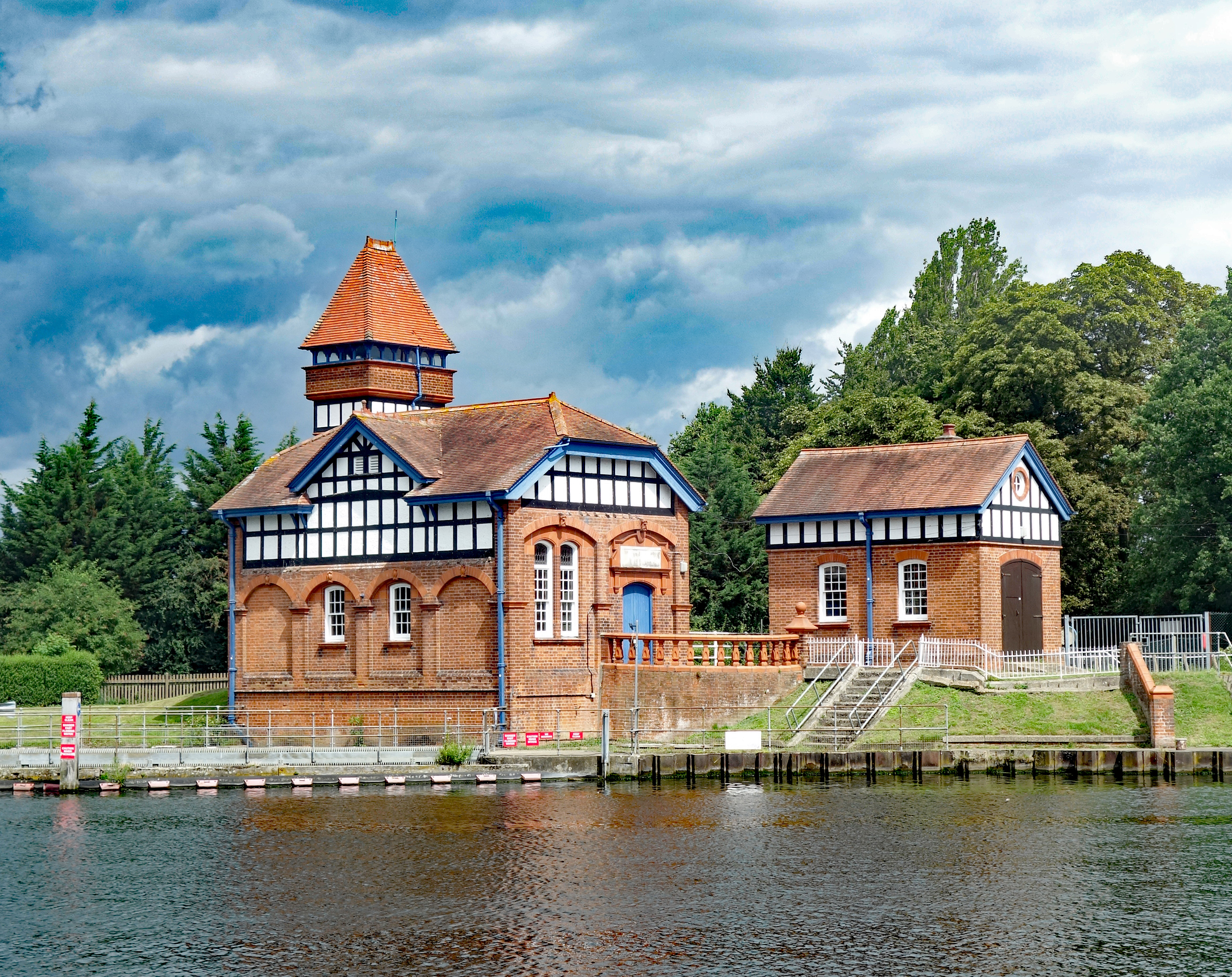
Hythe End Pumping Station

Hythe End is the part of the village closest to Staines, largely a linear development on Staines Road, on the eastern bank of the River Thames close to Bell Weir Lock, with a large minority of properties adjoining the riverside. Hythe End consists of several riverside homes, mainly on the Island. Gravel pits to the north containing water and reeds make up a Site of Special Scientific Interest. One of the major features of Hythe End is the river water extraction facility. This was built in 1910 by the Metropolitan Water Board to supply water from the River Thames to its works in Ashford Common via the Staines Aqueduct. This first feeds the King George VI Reservoir and continues eastwards, passing the water treatment works at Kempton Park, to provide some of the supply of the Kempton Park Reservoirs and another water treatment works at Hampton. The Buckinghamshire Way long-distance walking route begins in Hythe End, as the southernmost point of that county.

=== Sunnymeads ===
Sunnymeads is the linear western neighbourhood bordering the River Thames, and has its own railway station. Although long part of Wraysbury administratively, its almost uninterrupted narrow green belt continues to render it a separate settlement. The station is unmanned with no inside waiting areas. Both during and after the Second World War, Sunnymeads was a favourite destination for Londoners who would lease or acquire plots and build modest shacks on the river. Few of these original houses still exist as they have been demolished and more permanent, larger houses have been built in their place. Sunnymeads Masonic Lodge – King John's hunting lodge may only in name date to the time of the Magna Carta – is a restored late 14th-century building, dating to the reign of the first Tudor king, Henry VII, which is Grade II* listed.

=== Friary Island ===
Friary Island is a low-lying residential island about 400 metres long and 100 metres wide. It is accessed by two bridges over a narrow branch of the River Thames.

== Politics ==
At a parish level, the village is represented by eleven councillors of the Wraysbury Parish Council. At the district level, the village is part of the Datchet, Horton and Wraysbury electoral ward and is currently represented by three councillors (David Buckley and Jodie Grove of The Borough First Independents and Ewan Larcombe of the National Flood Prevention Party) in the Royal Borough of Windsor and Maidenhead. Nationally, since 1997 the ward has formed part of the UK Parliamentary constituency of Windsor and is currently represented by Jack Rankin of the Conservative Party. Before 1997, the town was part of the constituency of Windsor and Maidenhead which was consistently held by the Conservative Party.

== Notable residents ==
- David Gilmour – musician of the British rock band Pink Floyd
- Gordon Cullen – architect (died 1994)
- Christine Keeler – involved in the Profumo affair.
- Bunty Bailey – girl in the rotoscoped music video "Take On Me" by A-ha; also the video for another A-ha song, "The Sun Always Shines On T.V.", and also a past member of Hot Gossip
- Andy Ellison, singer in British rock bands John's Children, Radio Stars, Jet
- Beryl Reid, actress
- Sarah Harding, Girls Aloud singer
- Susan George, actress
- Boris Karloff, actor
- Gary Numan, musician
- Louise Cordet, pop singer

== Freedom of the Parish ==
The following people and military units have received the Freedom of the Parish of Wraysbury.

=== Individuals ===
- Ernest John Sleep
