= Wraysbury and Hythe End Gravel Pits =

Protected area in Berkshire, England

- Site of Special Scientific Interest
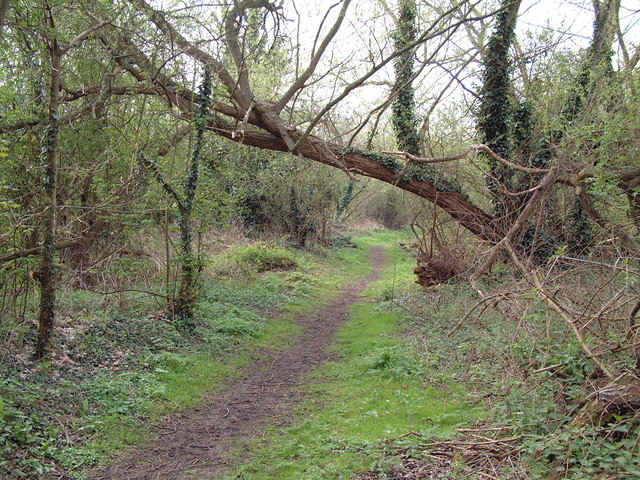

- Location within Berkshire
- Location of Wraysbury and Hythe End Gravel Pits.
- Area of search: Berkshire
- Grid reference: TQ 012 735
- Coordinates: 51.451°N 0.545°W
- Interest: Biological
- Area: 117.2 hectares (290 acres)
- Notification date: 1992
- Location map: Magic Map

Wraysbury and Hythe End Gravel Pits is a 117.2-hectare (290-acre) biological Site of Special Scientific Interest in Wraysbury in Berkshire. It is part of South West London Waterbodies Ramsar site and Special Protection Area.

The site features four former gravel pits and is within the floodplains of the River Thames and the Colne Brook. It is important for the number of bird species it features.

== Fauna ==
The following species have been recorded on the reserve.

=== Birds ===
- Tufted duck
- Gadwall
- Goosander
- Common goldeneye
- Smew
- Common pochard
- Eurasian Wigeon
- Mandarin duck
- Common Shelduck
- Common kingfisher
- Common grasshopper warbler
- Eurasian reed warbler
- Common redshank
- Eurasian coot
- Grey heron
- Little egret
- Common buzzard
- Water rail
- Ring-necked parakeet
- Grey wagtail
- Common reed bunting
- Common swift
- Common chiffchaff
- Garganey
- Hobby
- Eurasian collared dove
- Common nightingale
- Northern wheatear
- Whinchat
- Slavonian grebe
- Red-necked grebe
- Black-necked grebe
- Long-tailed duck (rare)
- Red-breasted merganser
- Common sandpiper
- Green sandpiper
- Little ringed plover
- Common ringed plover
- Common snipe
- Jack snipe
- Lesser redpoll
- Lesser scaup (rare)
- Ortolan bunting (rare)

=== Invertebrates ===
- White-legged damselfly
- The beetle, Oulimnius major
- The caddisfly, Leptocerus lusitanius

== Flora ==
The following plants have been recorded at the site:

=== Trees ===
- Common buckthorn
- Crack willow

=== Plants ===
- Common reed
- Lesser pond-sedge
- Greater pond-sedge
- Small pondweed
- Common bulrush
- Trifid bur-marigold
- Horned pondweed
- Grass vetchling
- Spiked sedge
