= Wraysbury No 1 Gravel Pit =

Protected area in Wraysbury, England

- Site of Special Scientific Interest
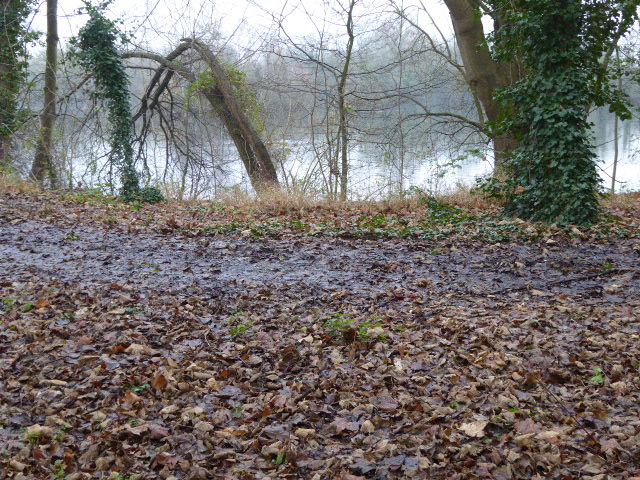

- Location within Berkshire
- Location of Wraysbury No 1 Gravel Pit.
- Area of search: Berkshire
- Grid reference: TQ 003 747
- Coordinates: 51.463°N 0.556°W
- Interest: Biological
- Area: 58.0 hectares (143 acres)
- Notification date: 1999
- Location map: Magic Map

Wraysbury No 1 Gravel Pit is a 58.0-hectare (143-acre) biological Site of Special Scientific Interest in Wraysbury in Berkshire. It is part of South West London Waterbodies Ramsar site, and Special Protection Area. The lake has an area of 39.6 hectares (98 acres). The pit was excavated in the 1920s and 1930s with gravel being removed from the site. Over the years plants and wildlife have colonised the area and it is now mature.

== History ==
This gravel-pit is one of a number of pits in this area formed when deposits of sand and gravel from the floodplain of the nearby Thames were excavated in open cast mining activities. Following removal of the minerals, any disused pits were allowed to flood with water, and gradually returned to nature. The present lake had reached 50 acres by the 1930s. At some stage the lake must have been stocked with carp and other coarse fish, and now provides good angling.

== SSSI ==
The site consists of a steep-sided lake and adjoining strips of scrubland and patches of trees. The SSSI is of major national importance for the gadwall, which visit it in winter, and is also made use of by other waterfowl such as the northern shoveler, the Smew, the tufted duck, the common pochard and the common goldeneye. It is also visited in winter by the great crested grebe, the great cormorant and the Eurasian coot. The terrestrial habitat supports many birds including the Eurasian treecreeper, the garden warbler, the great spotted woodpecker and the Eurasian hobby. There are a few areas of rough grassland supporting such species as lesser knapweed, wild carrot, meadow vetchling and common bird's-foot trefoil.
