= Stanwell Moor =

Village in Surrey, England

Coordinates: 51°27′50″N 0°30′00″W

- Village
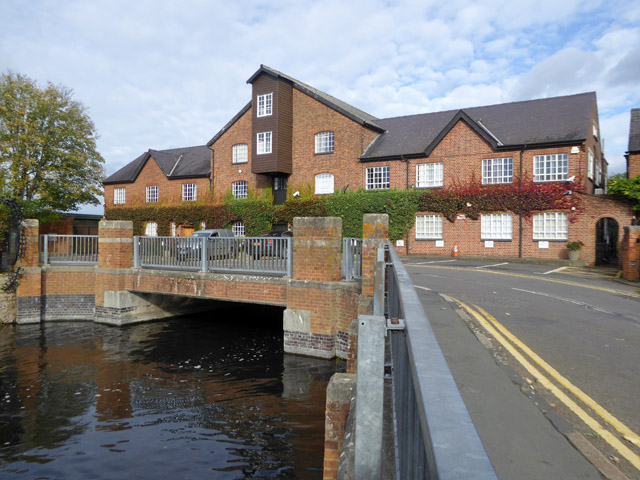
- The Old Mill

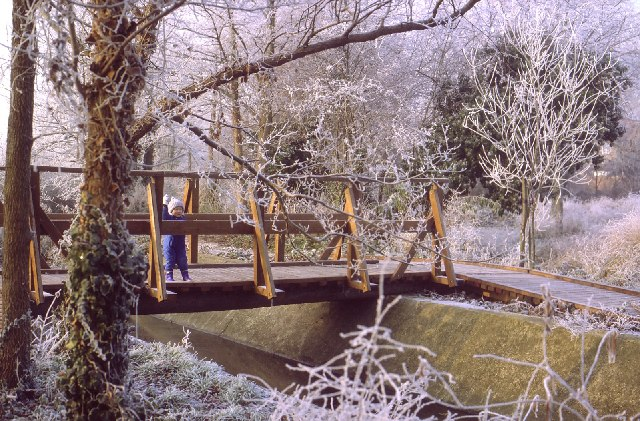
- Footpath bridge connecting stream-side cottages in winter

- Location within Surrey
- Area: 2.63 km^{2} (1.02 sq mi)
- Population: 1,371 (2011 census)
  - Density: 521/km^{2} (1,350/sq mi)
- OS grid reference: TQ0475
- District: Spelthorne
- Shire county: Surrey
- Region: South East
- Country: England
- Sovereign state: United Kingdom
- Post town: Staines-upon-Thames
- Postcode district: TW19
- Dialling code: 01753
- Police: Surrey
- Fire: Surrey
- Ambulance: South East Coast
- UK Parliament: Spelthorne

Stanwell Moor is a village and moor in the Borough of Spelthorne, approximately 17 miles (27 km) west of central London. Historically part of the county of Middlesex, it was transferred to Surrey in 1965. West of its generally narrow moor is the M25 London Orbital Motorway and the village is 1 mile (1.6 km) southwest of Heathrow Airport Terminal 5.

The River Colne runs to the west of the moor and the village is in Colne Valley regional park.

Stanwell Moor is distinct from Stanwell, approximately 1 mile (1.6 km) to the east. It is part of the same ward and ecclesiastical parish.

== History and geography ==
The locality gained its main barrier from what had always been its village in the early 1960s, a dual carriageway, and it hived off shortly after with the building of a community hall and establishment of its own residents' association. It is however, ecclesiastically, still strongly tied with Stanwell in the Church of England, its parish. Fewer than six of the original medieval buildings stand in the hamlet.

It sits on the part of the parish on strongly fertile, partly densely wooded, alluvial soil, whereas most of Stanwell was associated with the stony ground which makes up gravel deposits near to the surface of the soil, as throughout the area south of Heathrow Airport to the River Thames.

== Local government ==
The community is in the Stanwell North ward, as used by Spelthorne and for certain statistical purposes.

== Amenities ==
A parade of shops is here, followed at one end by a pub. Distributaries of the complex River Colne runs past Stanwell Moor where it forms a broad part of the Colne Valley regional park. Stanwell Moor is buffered from all other settlements. Its south is covered by the King George VI Reservoir after which is Staines upon Thames. South-west is the Wraysbury Reservoir.

Carlone Ltd, a private bus operator, runs route 442 half-hourly through the village between Heathrow Terminal 5 and Staines upon Thames town centre via Stanwell and Ashford.

== Demography and housing ==
2011 Census Homes
| Output area | Detached | Semi-detached | Terraced | Flats and apartments | Caravans/temporary/mobile homes | Shared between households |
|---|---|---|---|---|---|---|
| Stanwell Moor | 94 | 184 | 187 | 78 | 1 | 6 |

The average level of accommodation in the region composed of detached houses was 28%, the average that was apartments was 22.6%.

| Output area | Population | Households | % Owned outright | % Owned with a loan | hectares |
|---|---|---|---|---|---|
| Stanwell Moor | 1,371 | 550 | 25.5 | 47.5 | 263 |

The proportion of households in the settlement who owned their home outright compares to the regional average of 35.1%. The proportion who owned their home with a loan compares to the regional average of 32.5%. The remaining % is made up of rented dwellings (plus a negligible % of households living rent-free).

== Gallery ==
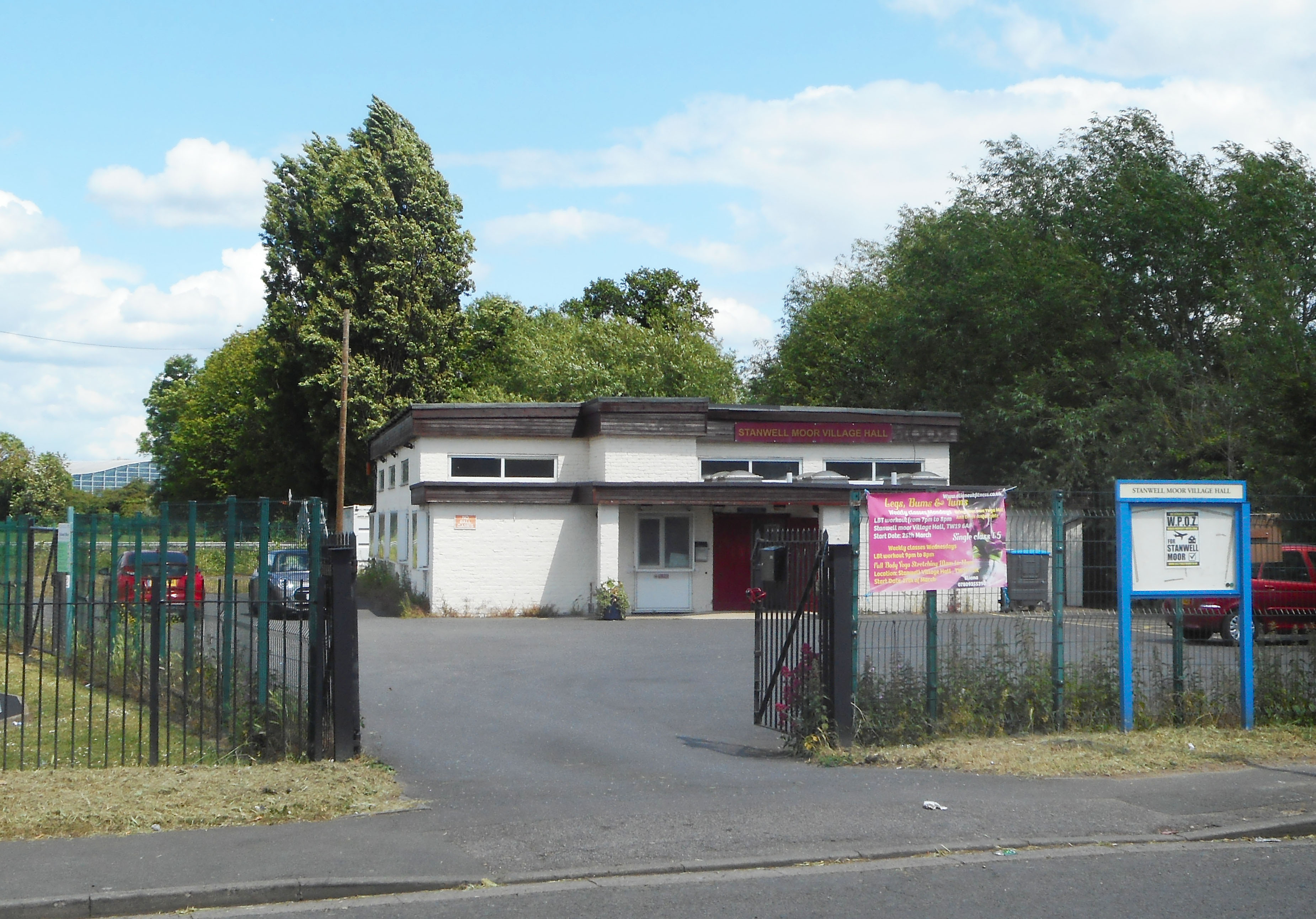
Stanwell Moor Village Hall

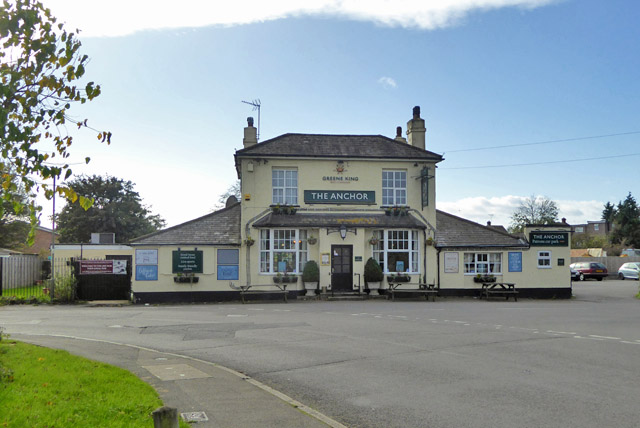
The Anchor public house

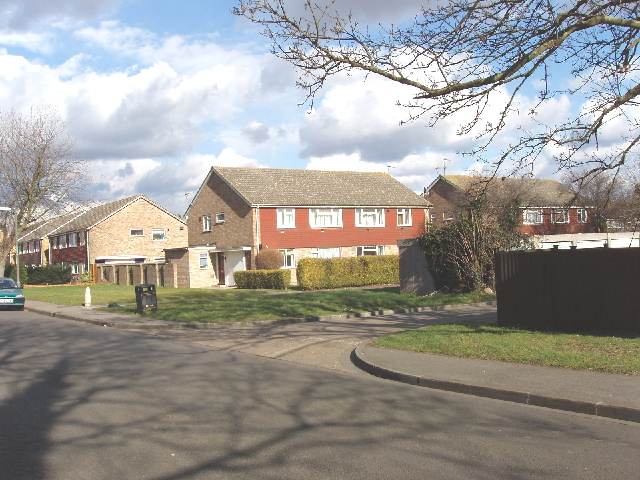
Semi-detached and maisonette estate of Stanwell Moor

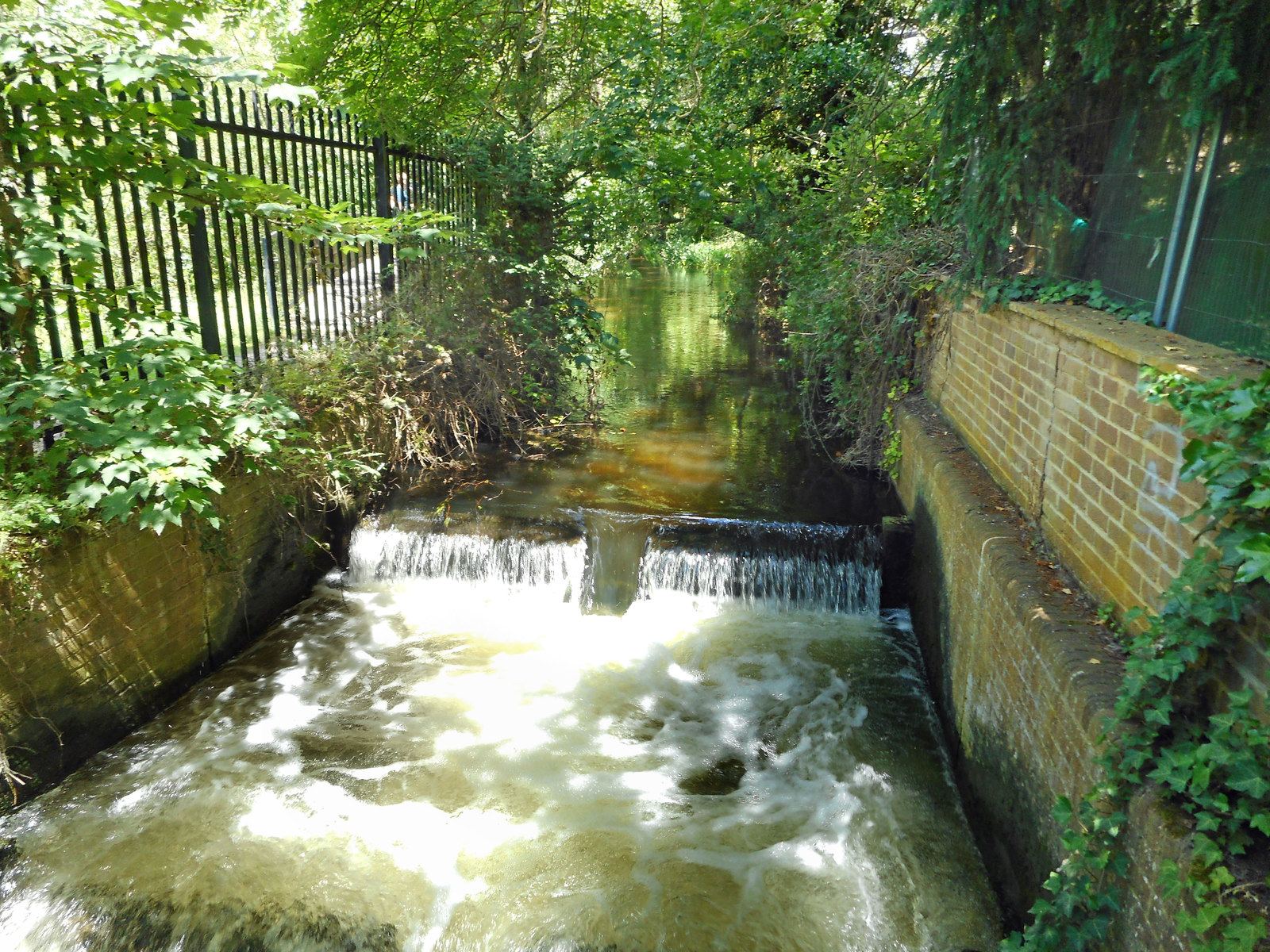
Weir on the River Colne in Stanwell Moor

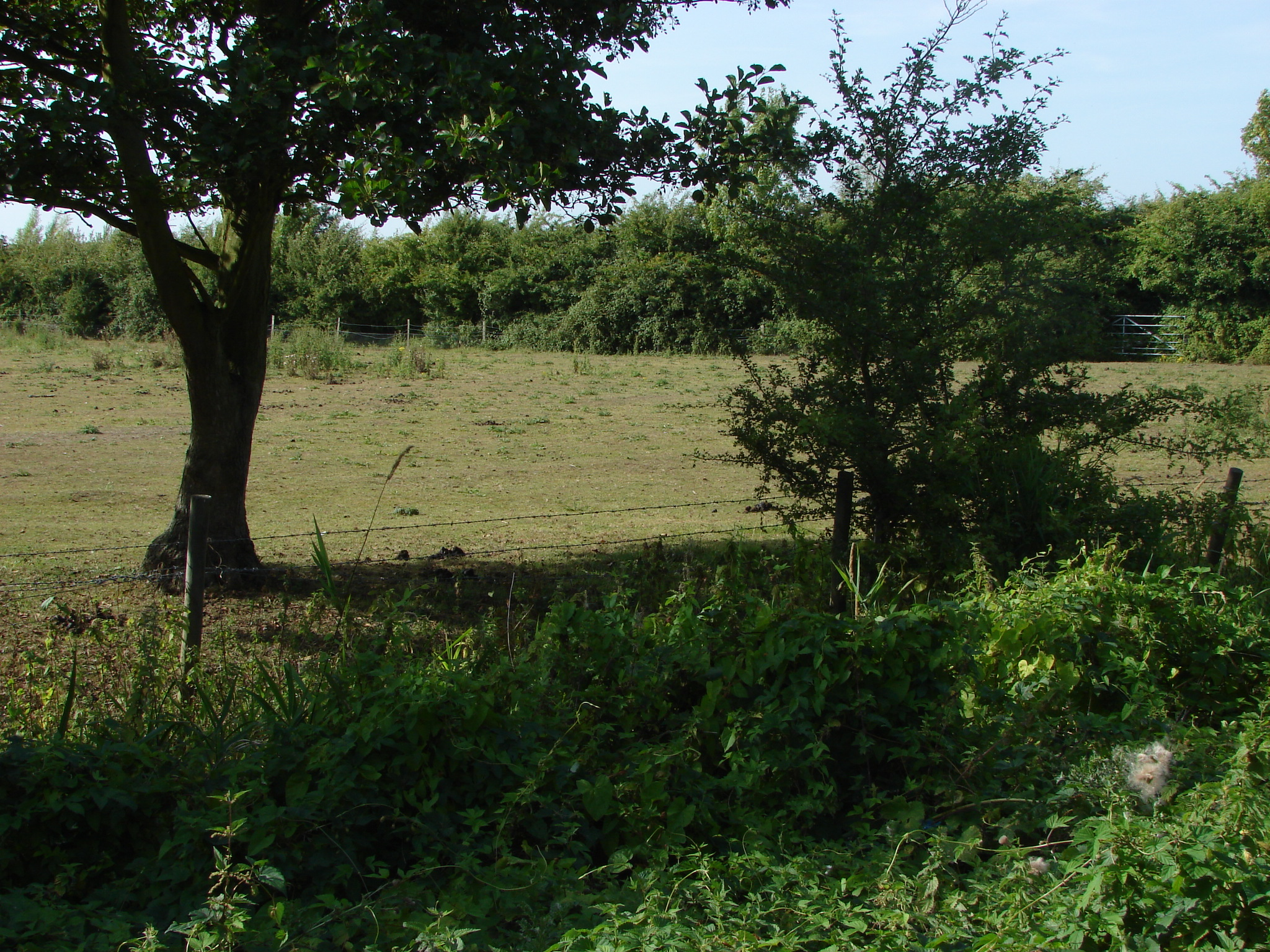
Field of Lower Mill Farm from the public footpath

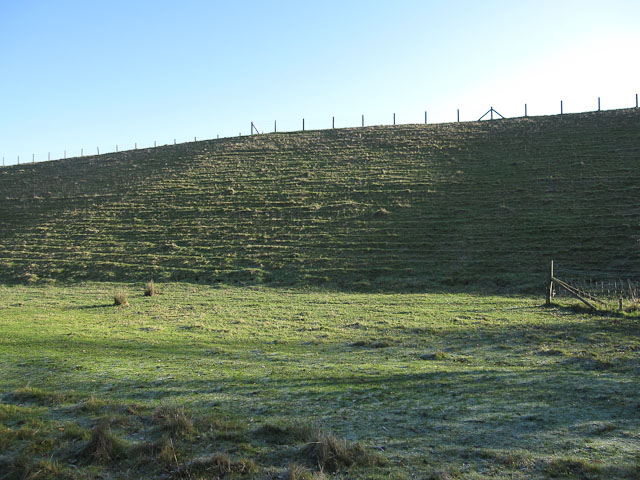
King George VI Reservoir with field used for sheep farming
