= Ankerwycke Yew =

Ancient tree

Coordinates: 51.44475°N 0.55651°W

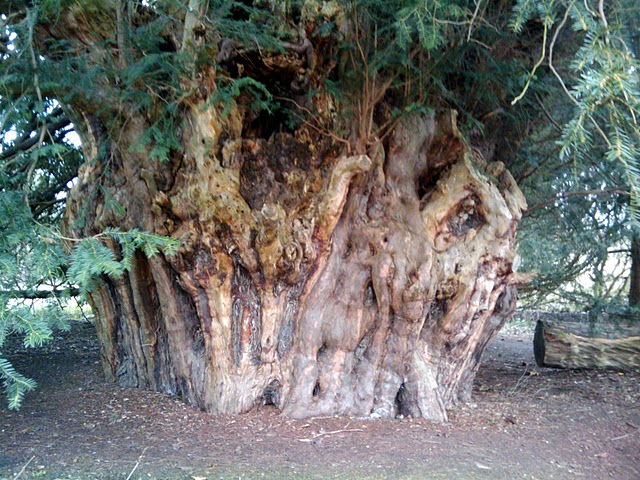
The Ankerwycke Yew

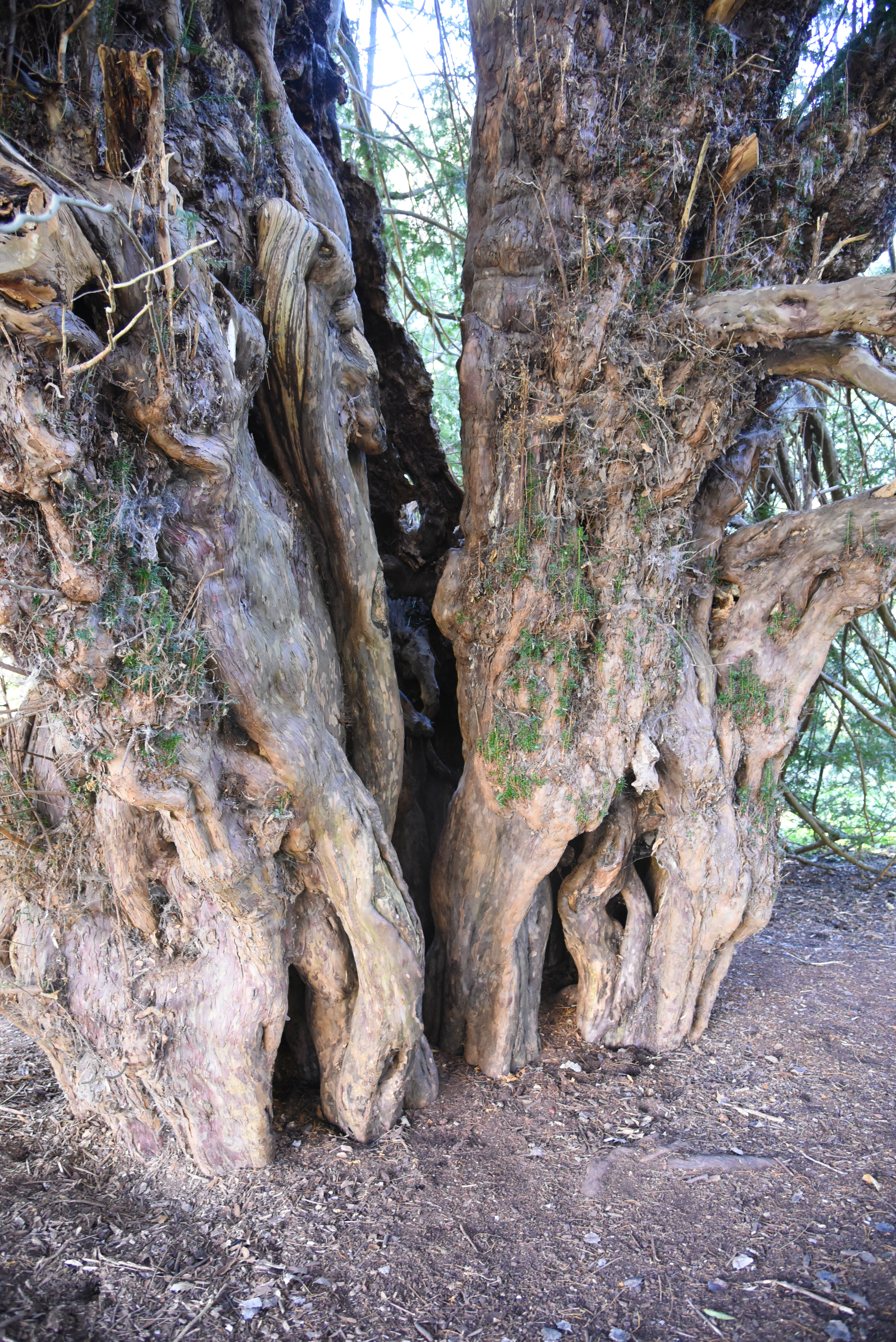
The east side of the tree

The Ankerwycke Yew is an ancient yew tree close to the ruins of St Mary's Priory, the site of a Benedictine nunnery built in the 12th century, near Wraysbury in Berkshire, England. It is a male tree with a girth of 8 metres (26 ft) at 0.3 metres. The tree is at least 1,400 years old, and could be as old as 2,500 years.

On the opposite bank of the River Thames are the meadows of Runnymede and this tree is said to have been witness to the sealing of Magna Carta. The tree is one of the places where Henry VIII may have courted Anne Boleyn.

Here the confederate Barons met King John, and having forced him to yield to the demands of his subjects they, under the pretext of securing the person of the King from the fury of the multitude, conveyed him to a small island belonging to the nuns of Ankerwyke [the island], where he signed the Magna Carta.

— J. J. Sheahen, 1822.

There is some justification for the hypothesis that the Ankerwycke Yew could be "the last surviving witness to the sealing of Magna Carta 800 years ago". "In the 13th century, the landscape would have been different as the area was probably rather marshy as it was within the flood plain of the Thames. The Ankerwycke Yew is on a slightly raised area of land (therefore dry) and with the proximity of the Priory perhaps both lend some credibility to this claim."

The Ankerwycke Yew is situated on lands managed by the National Trust. In 2002 it was designated one of fifty Great British Trees by The Tree Council.

== See also ==
- Fortingall Yew
- List of individual trees
- List of oldest trees
