= King George VI Reservoir =

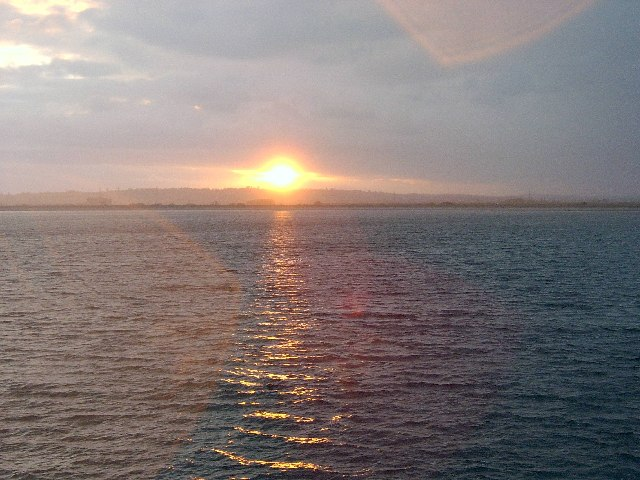
- View across the reservoir

- Location within Surrey
- Location: Surrey since 1965; Middlesex before 1965
- Coordinates: 51.449°N 0.502°W
- Type: Man made reservoir
- Primary inflows: Staines Reservoirs Aqueduct from Hythe End
- Primary outflows: Staines Reservoirs Aqueduct to Kempton Park and Hampton Waterworks
- Catchment area: Thames Basin
- Basin countries: United Kingdom
- Built: 1937; 89 years ago
- Surface area: 140 ha (350 acres)
- Max. depth: 17 m (56 ft)
- Water volume: 15.88 Gl (3.49×10^{9} imp gal)
- Shore length^{1}: 5.23 kilometres (3.25 mi)
- Surface elevation: 15 metres (49 ft) to 16 metres (52 ft)
- Islands: None
- ^{1} Shore length is not a well-defined measure.

The King George VI Reservoir sits between Stanwell Moor and Staines upon Thames, south-west of Heathrow, England. It is between Staines Moor and a north–south road abutting the Staines Reservoirs. The reservoir was opened in November 1947 and named after the then reigning monarch George VI. It is owned by Thames Water.

== Construction and statistics ==
It occupies 350 acres (1.4 km^{2}) and holds 3,493 million gallons (15,880,000 m^{3}) or, per The Times, 4,466 million gallons. The top of its banks are 56 ft (17 m) above the surrounds. The enclosing bank crest measures 5.23 km. Like its Lower Thames siblings, it is of earthen dam build: a puddled clay lining and embankments from materials excavated on site, particularly ballast (heavier aggregates). It has been built-up from dry land as the eastern Thames Basin lacked sufficiently watered, largely unpopulated, agriculturally unprized vales to be dammed near to which conveniently coal-supplied treatment works and pipes to London could be built.

A tendered bid for the work – at £1,292,000, equivalent to £76,100,000 in 2025 – was accepted in July 1937. The contractor was John Mowlem and Co. Limited.

== World War II use when empty ==
The reservoir was completed in 1939 but was left empty due to the outbreak of the Second World War. It is reputed that a mock Clapham Junction railway station was built inside to confuse the Luftwaffe. The reservoir was used for fog dispersal experiments for an aircraft landing in fog or smog technique, FIDO. It was formally opened by King George VI on 7 November 1947.

== Local economic history ==
The land purchase was likely connected with gravel extraction locally. Four such firms were digging for aggregates in Stanwell in 1956, employing nearly 100 people.

== Operation, sheep and notable birds ==
This and the Staines Reservoirs, built 1902, receive their input from the Thames at Hythe End, Wraysbury above Bell Weir Lock and the mouth of the Colne Brook. The reservoir's inlet valve tower is south, north of a pumping station; the outlet one is east, being gravity-fed. Input and output are to and from the Staines Reservoirs Aqueduct, feeding the Water Treatment Works at Kempton Park and another at Hampton.

To ease inspection of banks, a flock of sheep is kept on them which keeps them close-cropped.

It is part of the Staines Moor Site of Special Scientific Interest. The reservoirs carry (are habitats for) nationally large wintering populations of tufted ducks, pochard, goosander and goldeneye.

== See also ==
- London water supply infrastructure
- List of SSSIs in Surrey
