= Ankerwycke Priory =

Coordinates: 51.4442°N 0.5565°W

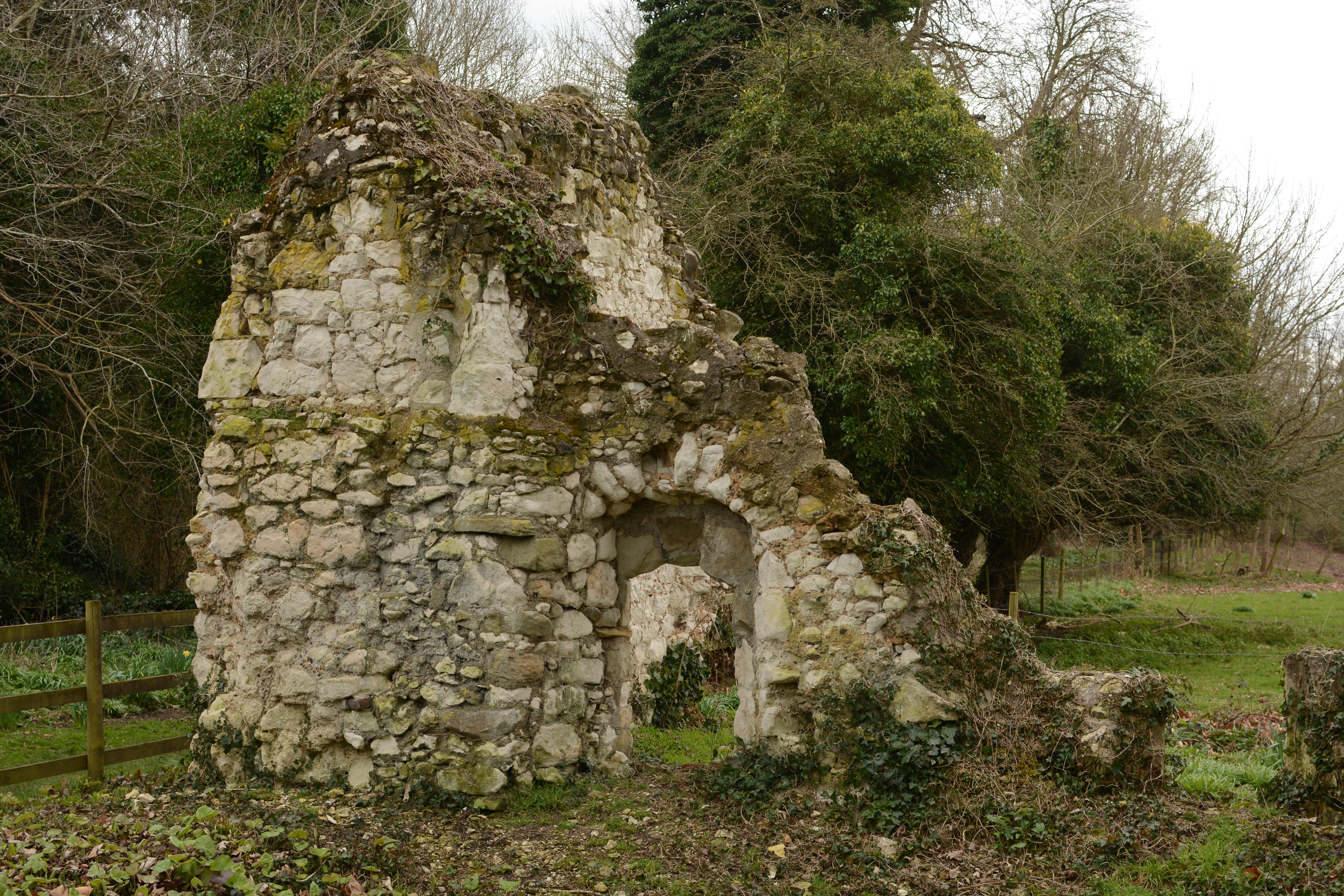
Ruins of Ankerwycke Priory.

Ankerwycke Priory was a priory of Benedictine nuns in the historic county of Buckinghamshire, England. The Grade II listed ruins are now located in the Royal Borough of Windsor and Maidenhead, in Berkshire.

The priory was established around 1160 by Gilbert de Muntfichet and his son Richard, dedicated to St. Mary Magdalene. It held an estate at Anckerwycke (or Anckerwick) near Wraysbury, and some land elsewhere in Buckinghamshire, Surrey, and Middlesex.

The priory was small and relatively poor; in the 1290s the lands were valued at 10s by the Taxatio Ecclesiastica. There were eight nuns recorded at an episcopal visitation in 1441, and an estimated seven or eight at the start of the sixteenth century. When it was dissolved in 1536, the revenues of either £22 or £44 per year were assigned to the re-founded Bisham Abbey; the prioress received a pension of £5 per year.

In 1197, a dispute over a nun who had left the priory after fifteen years and claimed she had been forced to take vows against her will reached Pope Celestine III.

After dissolution, Ankerwycke passed through a number of hands before being acquired by Sir Thomas Smith in 1550, who built a manor house on the site. Excavations were carried out at the priory in 2022, confirming that the Tudor house was developed from the existing priory and demolished in the early 19th century, leaving a small section of ruins from the original buildings. The site of the priory contains the Ankerwycke Yew, an ancient tree estimated at 1400–2000 years old, which would predate the foundation of the priory.
