= Horton and Wraysbury (ward) =

- Former electoral ward for the Windsor and Maidenhead Borough Council
- Horton and Wraysbury ward boundaries from 2003 to 2019
- District: Windsor and Maidenhead
- County: Berkshire
- Electorate: 3,875 (2011)

Former electoral ward
- Created: 1974
- Abolished: 2019
- Replaced by: Datchet, Horton and Wraysbury
- GSS code: E05002363

Horton and Wraysbury was an electoral ward in the Royal Borough of Windsor and Maidenhead from 1974 to 2019. It was first used at the 1973 elections and last used for the 2015 elections. The ward returned councillors to Windsor and Maidenhead Borough Council. The ward was subject to boundary revisions in 1983 and 2003.

== 2003–2019 Windsor and Maidenhead Borough council elections ==
There was a revision of ward boundaries in Windsor and Maidenhead in 2003.

=== 2015 election ===
The election took place on 7 May 2015.

2015 Windsor and Maidenhead Borough Council election: Horton and Wraysbury
Party	Candidate	Votes	%	±%
Conservative	Colin Rayner	1,712		
Conservative	John Lenton	1,545		
National Flood Prevention Party	Ewan Larcombe	743		
Labour	Peter Ward	404		
Liberal Democrats	Parvis Jamieson	209		
Liberal Democrats	Peter Wilkinson	146		
Turnout			66.78	
Conservative hold		Swing		
Conservative hold		Swing		

=== 2011 election ===
The election took place on 5 May 2011.

2011 Windsor and Maidenhead Borough Council election: Horton and Wraysbury
Party	Candidate	Votes	%	±%
Conservative	Colin Rayner	1,170		
Conservative	John Lenton	1,033		
Independent	Ewan Larcombe	491		
Labour	Peter Ward	255		
Total formal votes				
Informal votes		11		
Turnout			45.0	+1.0
Conservative hold		Swing		
Conservative hold		Swing		

=== 2007 election ===
The election took place on 3 May 2007.

2007 Windsor and Maidenhead Council election: Horton and Wraysbury
Party	Candidate	Votes	%	±%
Conservative	Colin Rayner	1,303		
Conservative	John Lenton	1,201		
Independent	Ewan Larcombe	410		
Liberal Democrats	Matthew Jackson	92		
Liberal Democrats	Martin Pritchett	66		
Total formal votes		1,677	99.9	
Informal votes		1	0.1	
Turnout		1,678	43.98	
Conservative hold		Swing		
Conservative gain from Independent		Swing		

=== 2005 by-election ===
The by-election took place on 16 June 2005.

2005 Horton and Wraysbury by-election
Party	Candidate	Votes	%	±%
Conservative	Colin Rayner	595		
Independent	Ewan Larcombe	499		
Total formal votes		1,094		
Informal votes				
Turnout				
Conservative gain from Independent		Swing		

=== 2003 election ===
The election took place on 1 May 2003.

2003 Windsor and Maidenhead Council election: Horton and Wraysbury
Party	Candidate	Votes	%	±%
Independent	Donald Gregory	790		
Independent	Richard Bertram	722		
Conservative	Duncan Parker	516		
Conservative	David Martin	474		
Labour	Paul Rae	69		
Total formal votes		1,363	99.5	
Informal votes		7	0.5	
Turnout		1370	34.7	
Independent win (new boundaries)				
Independent win (new boundaries)				
