= Wraysbury Reservoir =

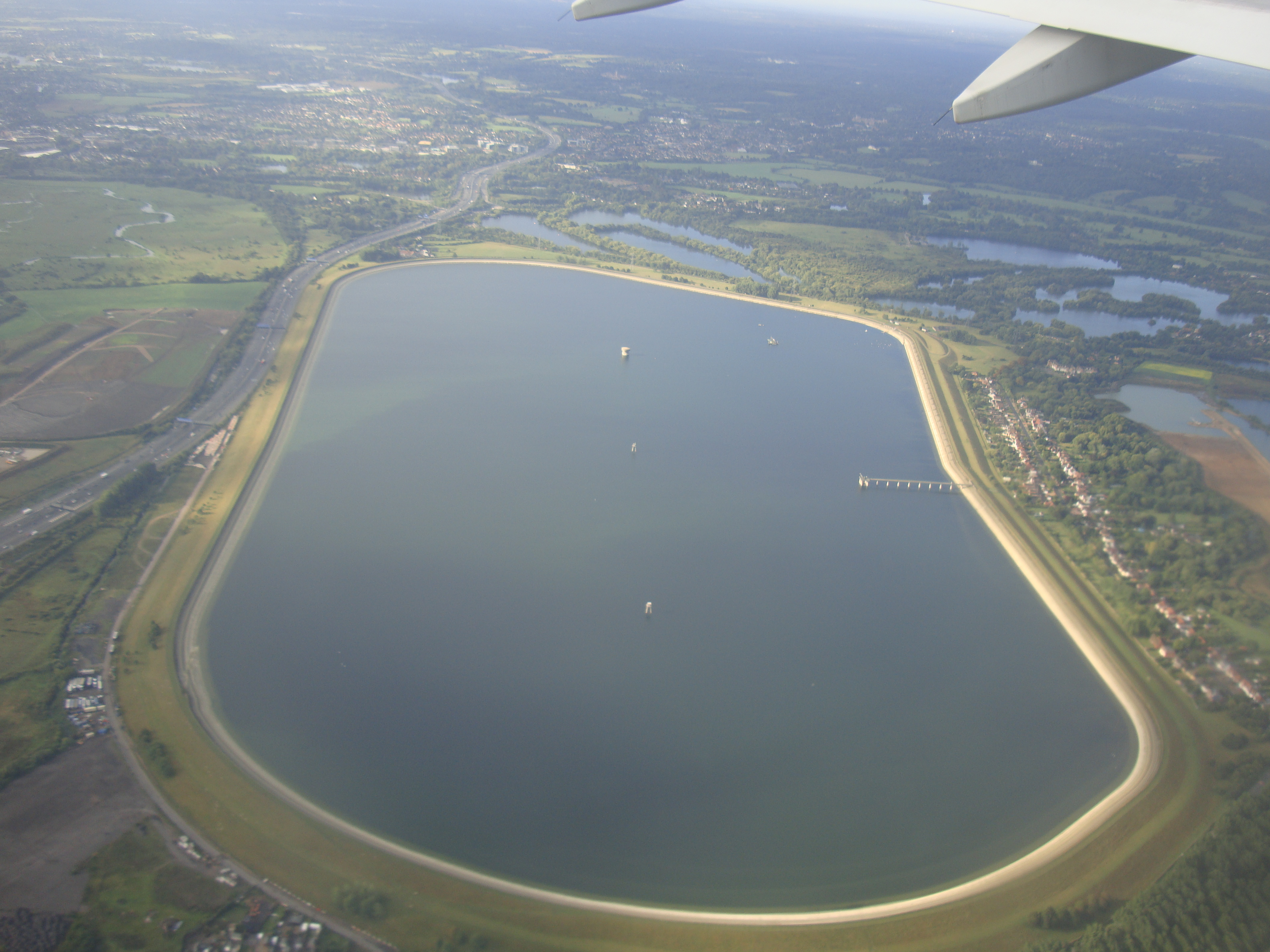
- Wraysbury Reservoir from the air, looking south

- Location within Surrey
- Location: Surrey
- Coordinates: 51°27′39.7″N 0°31′25.2″W
- Type: reservoir
- Basin countries: United Kingdom
- Surface area: 2.05 square kilometres (0.79 sq mi)
- Water volume: 34 Gl (7.5×10^{9} imp gal)

Wraysbury Reservoir
- Site of Special Scientific Interest
- Location of Wraysbury Reservoir.
- Area of search: Surrey
- Grid reference: TQ 025 745
- Interest: Biological
- Area: 205.6 hectares (508 acres)
- Notification date: 1999
- Location map: Magic Map

Wraysbury Reservoir is a water supply reservoir for London, west of the M25, east of the village of Wraysbury, and under the western approach path of Heathrow's southern runway. Construction began in 1967 and was completed by W. & C. French in 1970 with a capacity of 34,000 million litres (8,000 million gallons).

Engineering design data:

Parameter	Value
Top water level above ordnance datum	31.1 m
Volume of water storage	35 million m^{3}
Maximum depth of water	21 m
Water area	202 ha
Maximum height of bank above ground	17 m
Perimeter of bank	5,700 m

The reservoir is owned and operated by Thames Water; 400 million litres (100 million gallons) of water are pumped daily from an inlet at Datchet on the River Thames. A neighbouring reservoir is the King George VI Reservoir, opened in 1947, which is supplied from Hythe End. To keep the grass short and make inspections easier, Thames Water maintains a flock of sheep on the earthen banks. Less than 12% lay in Wraysbury, with the bulk in Stanwell and about 30% of the reservoir in Staines, however Stanwell was mostly ploughed fields and pasture until 1970 so gave its name to none of these four major features of its land; to simply planning applications on completion it became part of Spelthorne – from April 2027 West Surrey and South Middlesex.

The reservoir is the site of the National Physical Laboratory's Open-Water Test Facility, used by the Ministry of Defence for test and calibration of sonar systems, as well as civilian commercial customers.

It is a 205.6-hectare (508-acre) biological Site of Special Scientific Interest and part of South West London Waterbodies Ramsar site and Special Protection Area. It has nationally important numbers of wintering cormorants, great crested grebe and shovelers. It also supports many gadwalls.

== See also ==
- London water supply infrastructure
