= List of schools in Windsor and Maidenhead =

This is a list of schools in Windsor and Maidenhead in the English county of Berkshire.

== State-funded schools ==
=== Primary schools ===
- Alexander First School, Oakley Green
- All Saints CE Junior School, Maidenhead
- Alwyn Infant School, Maidenhead
- Bisham CE Academy, Bisham
- Boyne Hill CE Infant School, Maidenhead
- Braywick Court School, Maidenhead
- Braywood CE First School, Oakley Green
- Burchetts Green CE Infants' School, Burchetts Green
- Cheapside CE Primary School, Cheapside
- Clewer Green CE First School, Windsor
- Cookham Dean CE Primary School, Cookham Dean
- Cookham Rise Primary School, Cookham Rise
- Courthouse Junior School, Maidenhead
- Datchet St Mary's CE Primary School, Datchet
- Dedworth Green First School, Windsor
- Eton Porny CE First School, Eton
- Eton Wick CE First School, Eton Wick
- Furze Platt Infant School, Maidenhead
- Furze Platt Junior School, Maidenhead
- Hilltop First School, Windsor
- Holy Trinity CE Primary School, Cookham
- Holy Trinity CE Primary School, Sunningdale
- Holyport CE Primary School, Holyport
- Homer First School, Windsor
- King's Court First School, Old Windsor
- Knowl Hill CE Primary Academy, Knowl Hill
- Larchfield Primary School, Maidenhead
- Lowbrook Academy, Cox Green
- Oakfield First School, Windsor
- Oldfield Primary School, Maidenhead
- The Queen Anne Royal Free CE First School, Windsor
- Riverside Primary School, Maidenhead
- The Royal First School, Windsor
- St Edmund Campion RC Primary School, Maidenhead
- St Edward's RC First School, Windsor
- St Francis RC Primary School, Ascot
- St Luke's CE Primary School, Maidenhead
- St Mary's RC Primary School, Maidenhead
- St Michael's CE Primary School, Sunninghill
- South Ascot Village Primary School, Ascot
- Trinity St Stephen CE First School, Windsor
- Waltham St Lawrence Primary School, Waltham St Lawrence
- Wessex Primary School, Cox Green
- White Waltham CE Academy, White Waltham
- Woodlands Park Primary School, Woodlands Park
- Wraysbury Primary School, Wraysbury

=== Middle schools ===
- Dedworth Middle School, Windsor
- St Edward's Royal Free Ecumenical Middle School, Windsor
- St Peter's CE Middle School, Old Windsor
- Trevelyan Middle School, Windsor

=== Secondary and upper schools ===
- Altwood Church of England School, Maidenhead
- Charters School, Sunningdale
- Churchmead School, Datchet
- Cox Green School, Maidenhead
- Desborough College, Maidenhead
- Furze Platt Senior School, Maidenhead
- Holyport College, Holyport
- Newlands Girls' School, Maidenhead
- The Windsor Boys' School, Windsor
- Windsor Girls' School, Windsor

=== Special and alternative schools ===
- Forest Bridge School, Maidenhead
- Manor Green School, Maidenhead
- RBWM Alternative Learning Provision, Maidenhead

=== Further education ===
- Berkshire College of Agriculture, Burchetts Green
- East Berkshire College, Windsor

== Independent schools ==
=== Primary and preparatory schools ===
- Eton End School, Datchet
- Herries Preparatory School, Cookham Dean
- Highfield Preparatory School, Maidenhead
- The King's House School, Windsor
- Papplewick School, Ascot
- St George's School, Windsor
- St John's Beaumont School, Old Windsor
- St Piran's, Maidenhead
- Sunningdale School, Sunningdale
- Upton House School, Windsor

=== Senior and all-through schools ===
- Claires Court School, Maidenhead
- Eton College, Eton
- The Marist School, Sunninghill
- St George's School, Ascot
- St Mary's School, Ascot

=== Special and alternative schools ===
- Beech Lodge School, Hurley
- The Green Room, Windsor
- Heathermount School, Ascot
- Huntercombe Hospital School, Maidenhead
- Queensmead House School, Windsor
