= Thames Path =

National Trail following the River Thames in England

Coordinates: 51°40′N 1°15′W

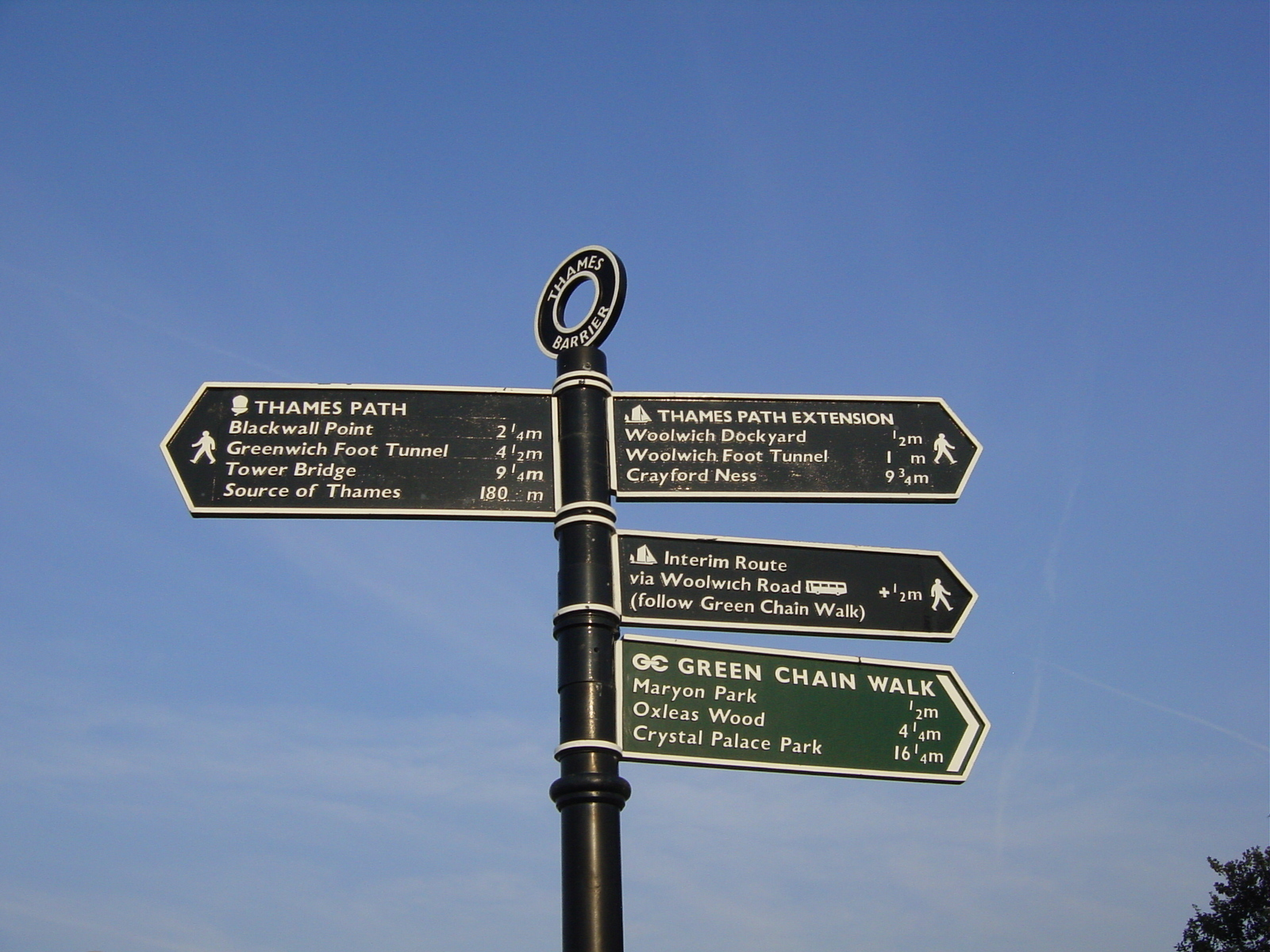
- The Thames Path sign near the end of the walk, by the Thames Barrier
- Length: 185 mi (298 km)
- Location: Southern England, United Kingdom
- Designation: UK National Trail
- Trailheads: Kemble, Gloucestershire and Woolwich
- Use: Hiking, cycling
- Elevation change: 110m
- Highest point: 110m
- Lowest point: 0m
- Difficulty: Easy
- Season: All year
- Sights: London, Hampton Court, Windsor, Oxford, Lechlade, Cricklade
- Hazards: flooding

The Thames Path is a National Trail following the River Thames from one of its sources near Kemble in Gloucestershire to the Woolwich foot tunnel, south east London. It is about 185 miles (298 km) long. A path was first proposed in 1948 but it only opened in 1996.

In theory, the Thames Path's entire length can be walked, and a few parts can be cycled, but certain sections are closed for an indefinite period, including Temple Bridge at Hurley and Marsh Lock in Henley (see section below). Some parts of the Thames Path, particularly west of Oxford, are subject to flooding during the winter. The river is tidal downstream from Teddington Lock and the lower parts of these paths may be underwater at spring tides, although the Thames Barrier protects London from catastrophic flooding.

The Thames Path uses the river towpath between Inglesham and Putney and available paths elsewhere. Historically, towpath traffic crossed the river using many ferries, but few of these crossings exist now and some diversion from the towpath is necessary.

The Thames Path meets The Ridgeway National Trail at the Goring Gap, where the trails use opposite banks of the River Thames between Goring-on-Thames and Mongewell; the Thames Path follows the western bank and The Ridgeway the eastern.

== Description and access to the river ==
The general aim of the path is to provide walkers with a pleasant route alongside the river. The way this is achieved naturally falls into three distinct areas, depending on the nature of the river in the area.

=== The unnavigable upper river ===
In the absence of a tow path, the Thames Path uses all available riverside rights of way between the traditional source of the river in Trewsbury Mead and Inglesham, but is unable to run alongside the river in several places.

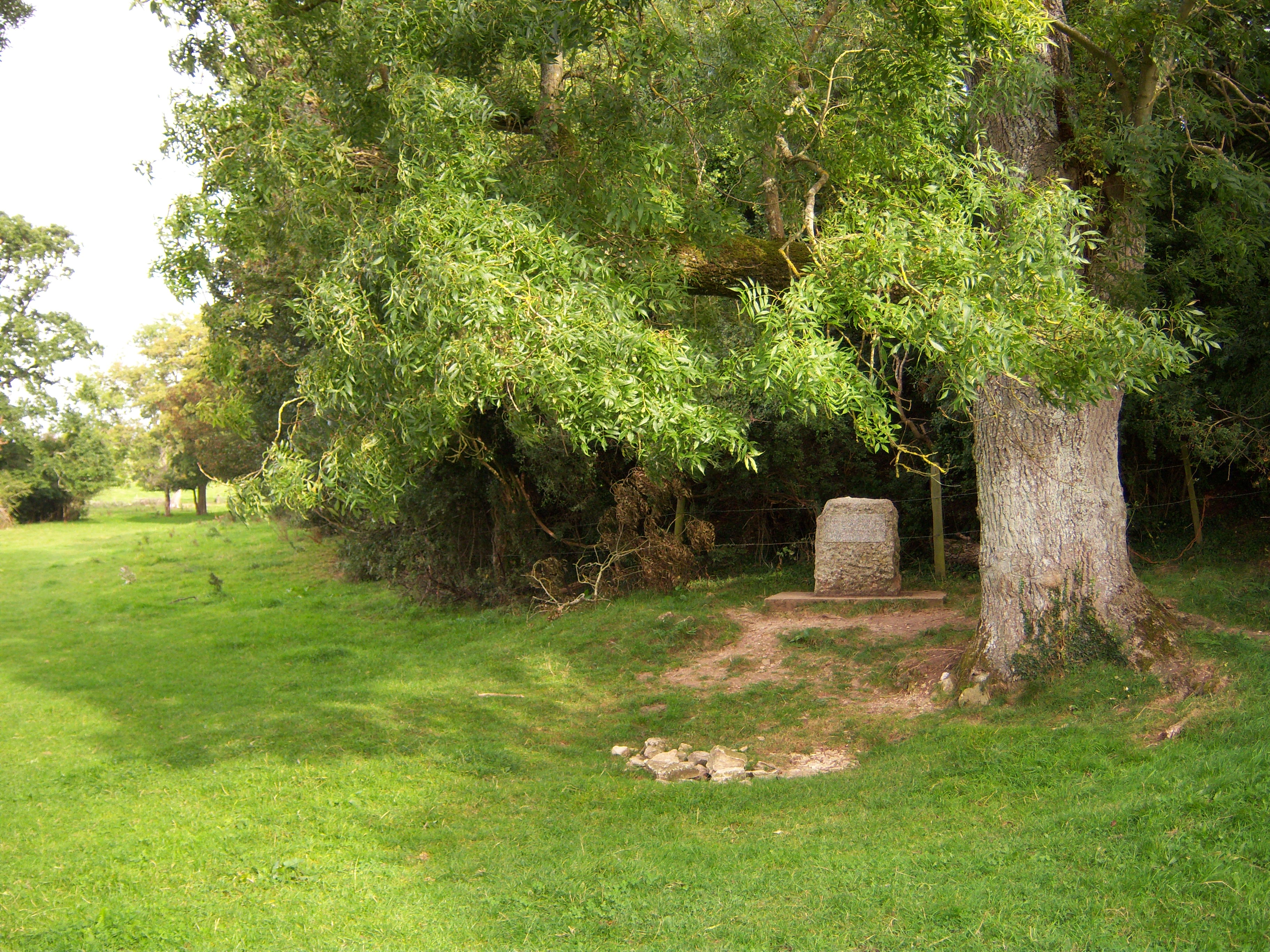
Thames Head

The Thames Path starts beside the monument for the traditional river source and follows the water down the hill towards the Fosse Way. In the fields either side of the A433 are some springs; and south of this road, a small water channel can be found and then a pool and small weir, before reaching the A429 bridge near Kemble. On the stretch between Ewen and Somerford Keynes the bourne passes through fields and there are a number of watermills. The path then follows the watercourse through the Cotswold Water Park to Ashton Keynes, where the water divides into a number of streams; the Thames Path partly follows one of these and rejoins the river by Waterhay Bridge. Downstream from this point canoeing in the river is practical. The path wanders to and from the river amongst more gravel pits until Hailstone Hill, where a riverside path starts by the old railway line. A little further, the North Wilts canal from Latton formerly crossed the river on an aqueduct and ran alongside and south of the river to West Mill Lane. Here the path leaves the river to go through Cricklade, past Cricklade Town Bridge, rejoining the river east of the town, and now follows the river all the way downstream to Castle Eaton. The path next follows country lanes, a short stretch along a backwater to Hannington Bridge then goes across fields to Inglesham. In 2018 the path incorporated a section of permissive path alongside the river at Upper Inglesham.

Above Inglesham the river is not dredged and being without weirs to control water levels, it is often shallow, weedy and swift but after heavy rain flooding of the riverside paths is common. Today the Environment Agency (the current successor to the Thames Conservancy) is the navigation authority responsible for the Thames between Cricklade and Teddington. The navigation towpath starts from Inglesham (just upstream of Lechlade), as does the ability to navigate the river for all but very small boats, although there were once weirs with flash locks to enable passage as far as Cricklade, and there is still a right of navigation up to Cricklade. The navigation above Lechlade clearly must have been neglected after the Thames and Severn Canal provided an easier route by canal for barge traffic and not all of the river downstream from Cricklade has a footpath alongside.

=== The navigable river with locks and towpath ===
The Thames Path uses the existing Thames towpath between Inglesham and Putney Bridge wherever possible. The former Thames and Severn Canal entrance is the present-day limit of navigation for powered craft, and is one and a half miles upstream of the highest lock (St John's Lock), near Lechlade. Today, between the canal entrance and Putney Bridge, the towpath still allows access by foot to at least one side of the river for almost the whole length of the main navigation of the river, but not mill streams, backwaters or a few meanders cut off by lock cuttings, since towpaths were originally only intended to enable towing of barges on the navigation.

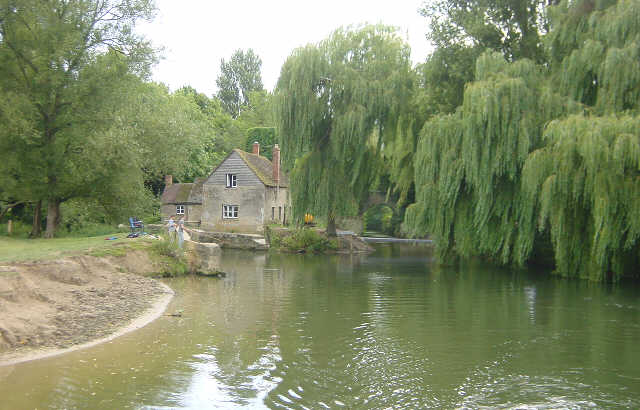
Thames and Severn Canal and River Coln joining the Thames with former canal warehouse to left and Round House behind it, covered in greenery

==== Origin of the towpath ====
The Thames has been used for navigation for a long time, although owners of weirs, locks and towpath often charged tolls. The towpath owes its existence, in its current form, to the Industrial Revolution and the Canal Mania of the 1790s to 1810s, and so is related to the history of the British canal system. The Thames already allowed for passage onto the River Kennet Navigation and River Wey Navigation, but this period in history also saw the Wilts & Berks Canal, the Oxford Canal and the Thames and Severn Canal connected to the non-tidal Thames. It was not until a little after the Thames Navigation Commission were enabled the Thames and Isis Navigation Act 1795 (35 Geo. 3. c. 106) to purchase land for a continuous horse path that the non-tidal navigation (and hence the towpath) was consolidated as a complete route under a single (toll charging) authority, upstream to Inglesham. This improved the ability of horse-drawn barge traffic to travel upstream to the Thames and Severn Canal, which had opened in 1789 and provided an alternative route (also using the Wilts & Berks Canal) for boat traffic to Cricklade. The commissioners had to create horse ferries to join up sections of towpath (for example at Purley Hall), as the act did not allow them to compulsorily purchase land near an existing house, garden or orchard. The City of London Corporation, who had rights and responsibilities for the Thames below Staines from a point marked by the London Stone, had similarly bought out the towpath tolls of riparian land owners as enabled by the earlier Thames Navigation Act 1776 (17 Geo. 3. c. 18).

From the 1840s, the development of the railways and steam power gradually made redundant the need for horse-drawn barges on the non-tidal Thames, although people were still using the towpath to tow small pleasure boats in 1889. The towpath route has not changed since then, apart from now following Shifford lock cut; however, over time the towpath ferries became obsolete and the last towpath ferry to stop running was the rope ferry at Bablock Hythe in the 1960s.

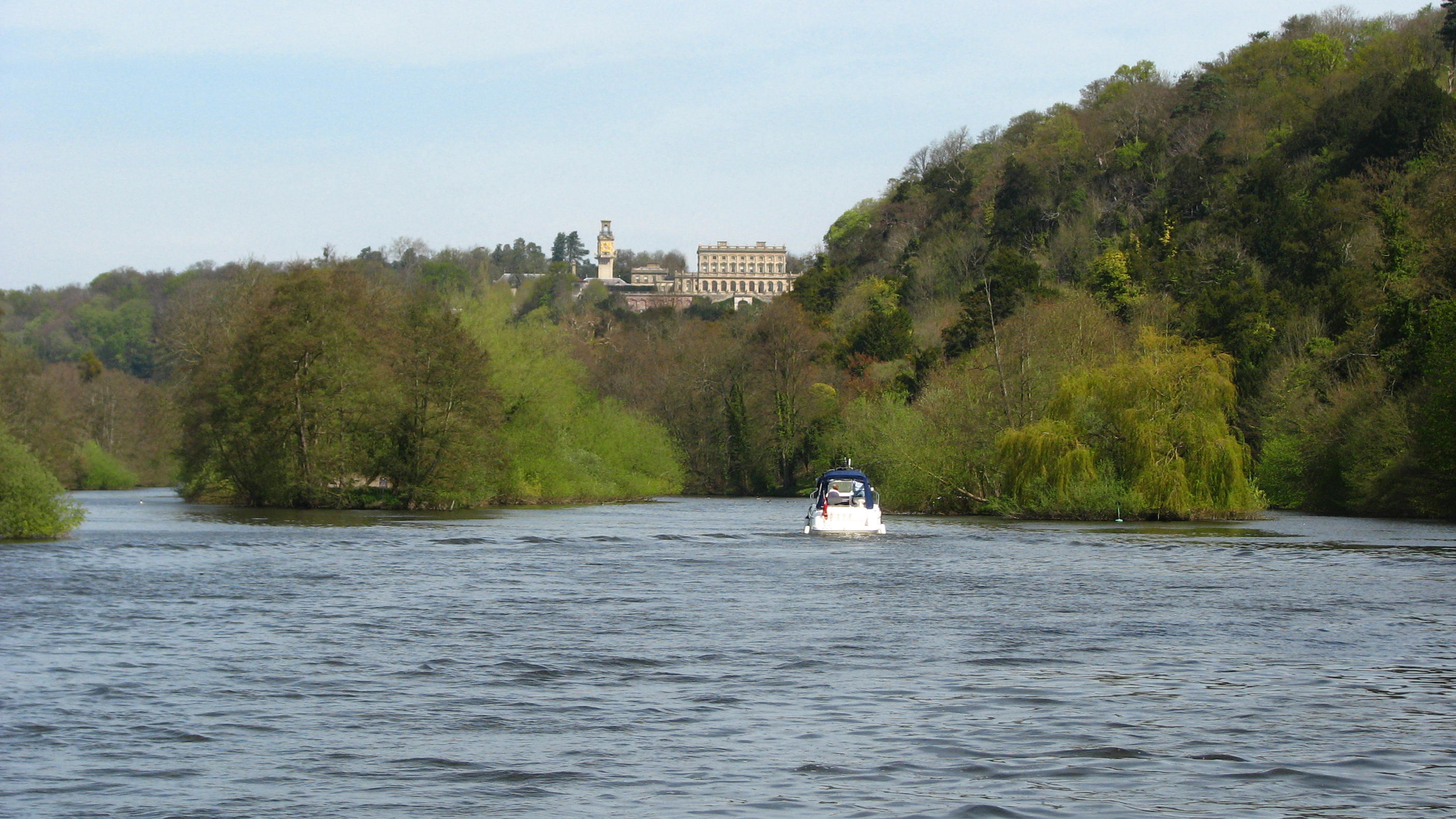
Cliveden from the River Thames

==== Deviations ====
The main exception to towpath access to the navigation between Inglesham and Putney is a stretch of river where the former towpath was removed past Windsor Castle. The castle's private grounds of Home Park, Windsor were extended to include the riverbank and its towpath by the Windsor Castle Act 1848 (11 & 12 Vict. c. 53), also involving the building of Victoria and Albert bridges and the removal of Datchet Bridge. This accounts for the Thames Path's diversion from the river at Datchet. There are two other short lengths of navigation which have no towpath: one between Marlow bridge and lock (which never had a towpath), and one past Whitchurch lock either side of The Swan public house in Pangbourne (where the towpath has been lost). At both these weirs, lengthy rope winches were required for barges to pass Marlow and Whitchurch in the days before steam power. It is also required to divert around Oxford Cruisers downstream of Pinkhill Lock, even though the towpath is still shown as a public right of way on Ordnance Survey maps. The remainder of the navigation between Inglesham and Putney has an existing towpath; however, river crossings are now missing at the sites of 15 former ferries and one former lock, so the Thames Path makes 11 other diversions from the remaining towpath because of the lack of a river crossing at their original locations. There is also a twelfth temporary diversion at Hammersmith Bridge, described below.

Walkers can visit the lengths of river navigation not on the Thames Path using the current towpath, except for two isolated sections of towpath not connected by any public path (or ferry) at either end. The first is a short section of path on the north bank opposite Purley-on-Thames; this is still shown on Ordnance Survey maps but is inaccessible except by boat, caused by the lack of two ferries formerly diverting around Purley Hall. The second and furthest downstream is a particularly picturesque section of towpath (again shown on OS maps) within the National Trust grounds of Cliveden; here the lack of three ferries accounts for the Thames Path's diversion from the river at Cookham.

When Cookham Lock was built in 1830, Hedsor Water became a backwater and lost its towpath. Around 1822, Clifton and Old Windsor locks were built, with lock cuttings which cut across river meanders; here the towpath was rerouted along the lock cuttings and there is no public riverside access to these river meanders. However, some stretches of river bypassed by navigation cuttings still retain public footpath access: firstly at Desborough Island (formed by Desborough Cut); secondly, parts of older towpath accessible at Duxford (towpath now follows Shifford Lock cut); and lastly, the river meander at Culham. The Culham meander is accessible, even though only parts are designated as public footpath (towpath now follows Culham Lock cut) and there is also riverside public footpath along the ancient causeway past Sutton Pools.

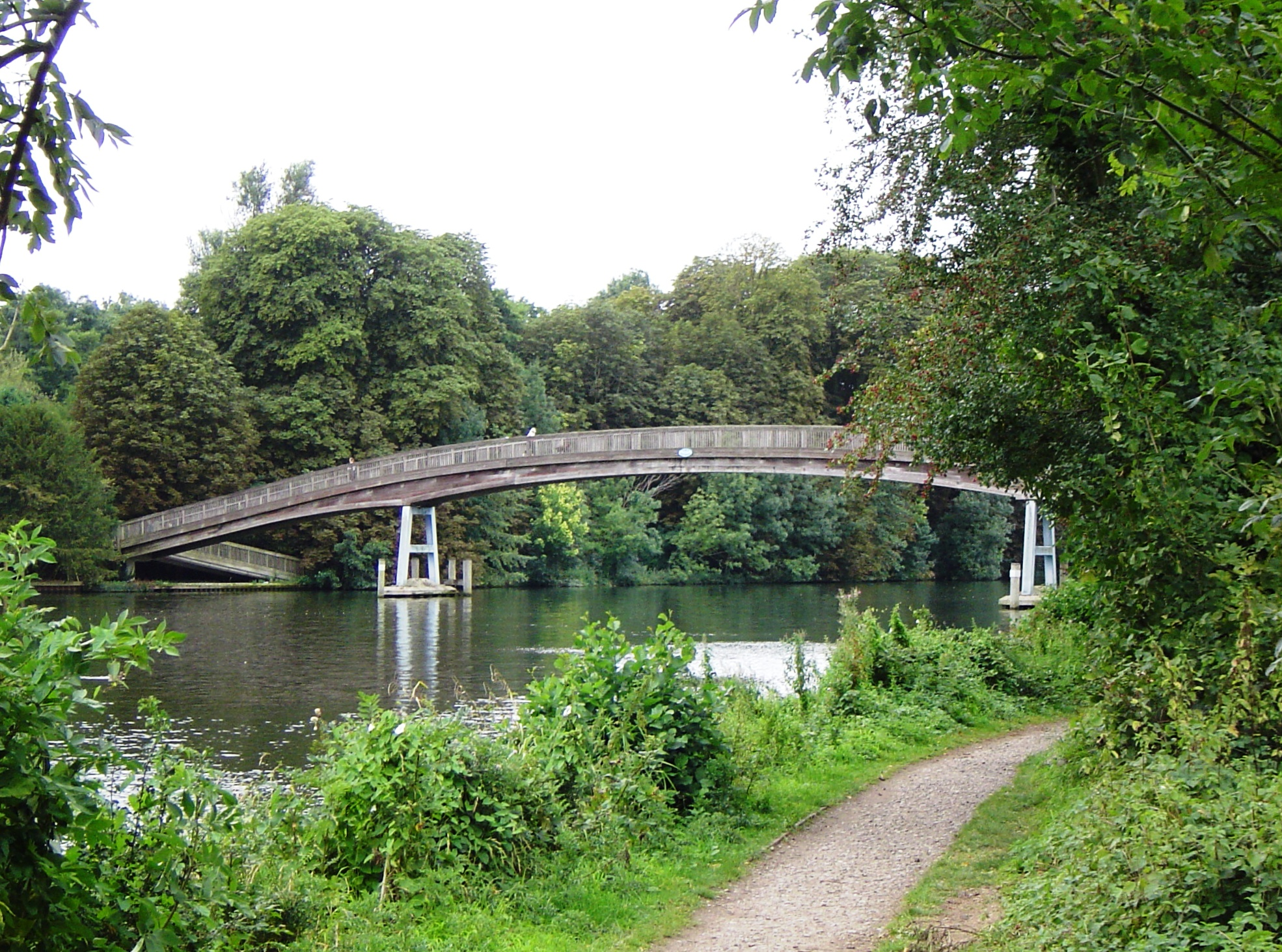
Temple Footbridge, built in 1989 for the Thames Path (currently closed)

==== Closed sections ====
Certain sections are closed indefinitely for reasons such as bridge failures. The closure between Shiplake and Henley involves a diversion of 2.7 miles (4.3km), taking about 1hr 15 minutes to walk. The bridge at Hurley is also closed. Details of all closures are shown on the trail's interactive map.

==== Changes to crossings ====
Historically, there have been replacements for towpath ferry crossings with bridges at Goring and Clifton Hampden and the path across the weir at Benson Lock (the towpath ferry was upstream). In recent times, crossings have been created for the Thames Path; the Shepperton to Weybridge Ferry was restarted in 1986, Temple Footbridge near Hurley was built in 1989, a footpath was attached to Bourne End Railway Bridge in 1992 (the ferry was upstream), and Bloomers Hole Footbridge was built in 2000. No other replacement river crossings have been created for lapsed ferries, so the Thames Path must divert away from the river and the towpath to cross the river elsewhere, leaving some sections of towpath not on the Thames Path.

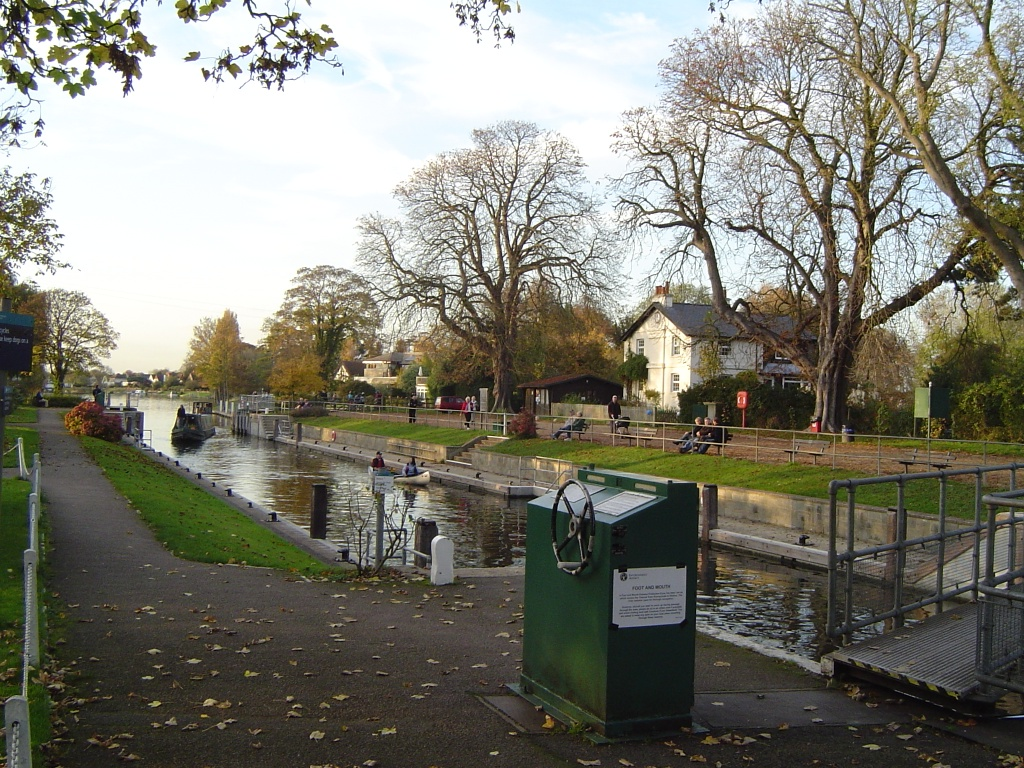
Penton Hook Lock, which has City of London arms on the original lock-keeper's house

==== Locks ====
Many walkers visit the locks on the River Thames and in summer some have facilities open for visitors. A few have small campsites. The locks at Cookham and Whitchurch are not on the Thames Path and require some effort to visit. Whitchurch Lock cutting was built through an island in the river and public access to the lock over the weir from Pangbourne or across the millstream at Whitchurch-on-Thames was closed in 1888 to avoid the loss of tolls on Whitchurch Bridge; as a consequence, Whitchurch is the only Thames lock that is inaccessible by foot – it is only accessible by boat. Cookham Lock is still accessible although it is not on the Thames Path. The Thames divides into several streams here and the towpath does not connect up without ferries; access to this lock requires a 10-minute walk across Odney Common on Formosa Island and the Lock Island (incorporating the former Mill Eyot) to Sashes Island. Marlow Lock access requires a short walk through town back streets. All the other locks have obvious access from the Thames Path.

The lock islands at Pinkhill Lock, Eynsham Lock, King's Lock, Boulters Lock and Shepperton Lock can be visited, as can Penton Hook Island which is a meander cutoff formed when Penton Hook Lock was built. Any public footpaths that cross or go along any of the other small islands formed by construction of the Thames locks only allow access to the path alone.

Lock building by the Thames Commissioners had improved the whole river navigation from Inglesham to the upper limit of the tidal reach at Staines by 1789. On the tidal Thames below Staines, six new locks were built by the City of London Corporation to improve the navigation between 1811 and 1815. The Thames Conservancy was established in 1857 to take over duties from the City of London because of falling revenue from boat traffic; it also took on the duties of the Thames Commissioners in 1866. Provision for pleasure boating was now the main purpose, and although the Thames Conservancy rebuilt many locks, upgrading some from flash locks to pound locks, and made navigation and towpath improvements, it only built one completely new lock on the non-tidal Thames, at Shifford in 1898.

=== The tidal river ===
There is a Thames Path on both sides of the river downstream of Teddington Lock, the southern path including the original towpath as far as Putney Bridge.

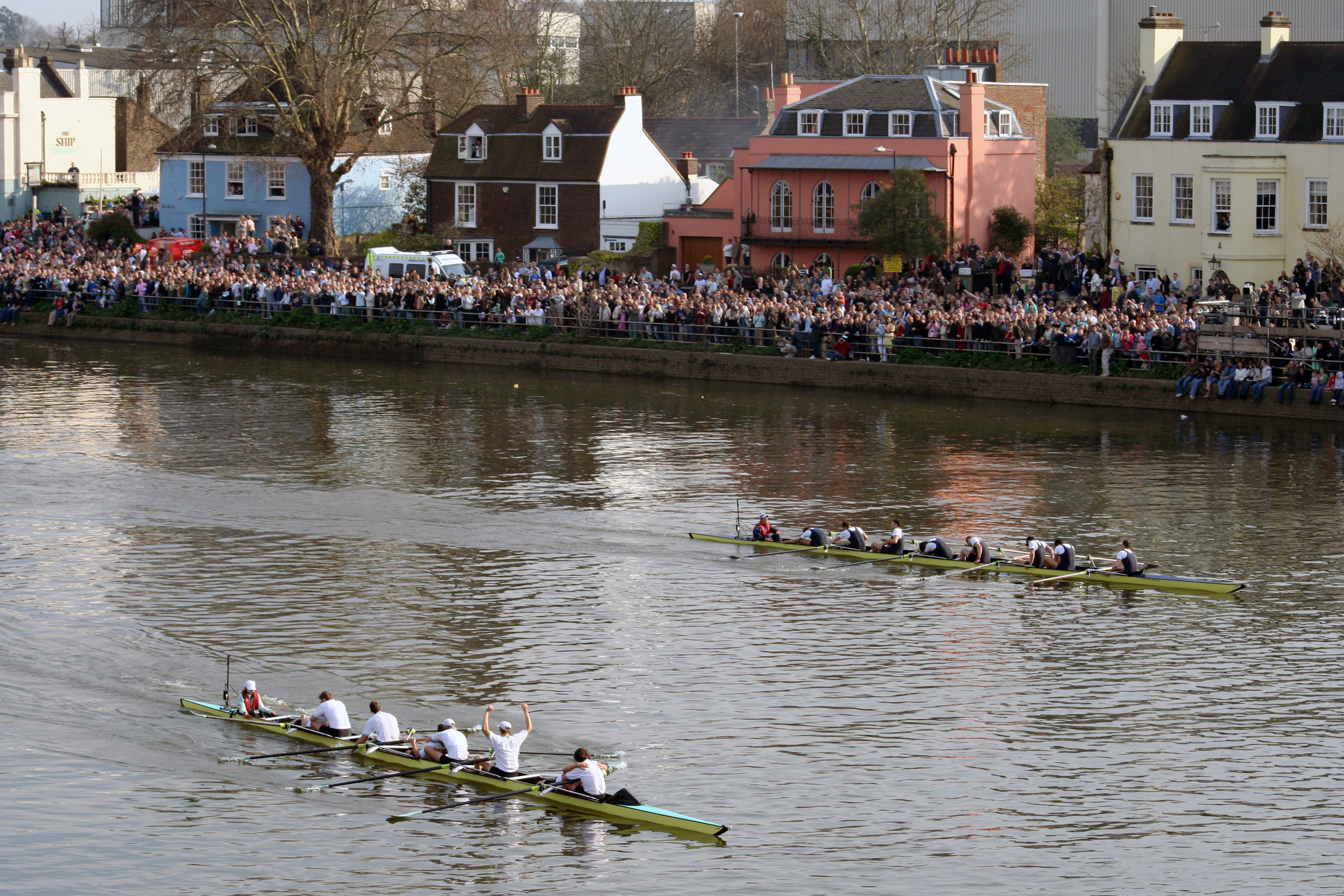
The Boat Race, viewed from Chiswick Bridge, looking at the crowds on the southern (Surrey) bank towpath

Because of the locks built by the City of London, the river is now tidal only downstream from Teddington Lock, although during spring tides flood warnings are sometimes issued upstream towards Molesey Lock. A further lock with a low-tide barrage (rather than a weir) was built by the Thames Conservancy in 1894 downstream at Richmond Lock to improve the navigation by maintaining water level upstream to at least half-tide level. Today, the Port of London Authority is the navigation authority that manages the tidal river, including Richmond Lock and barrage. Wharfs and jetties are generally confined to the northern (Middlesex) bank between Richmond and Putney. This stretch of tideway (known as the Upper Rowing Code Area) has special navigation rules to accommodate the activities of a number of rowing clubs, and includes the course used for The Boat Race. Chiswick Eyot is on this section and is notable as being the only tidal island on the river.

Since August 2020, the towpaths on both banks have been closed under Hammersmith Bridge because of cracks in the structure; walkers and cyclists must therefore divert from the river at the bridge until they reach the adjacent road (Castelnau on the south bank, Hammersmith Bridge Road on the north) and then cross the road at the nearest safe point before returning to the river.

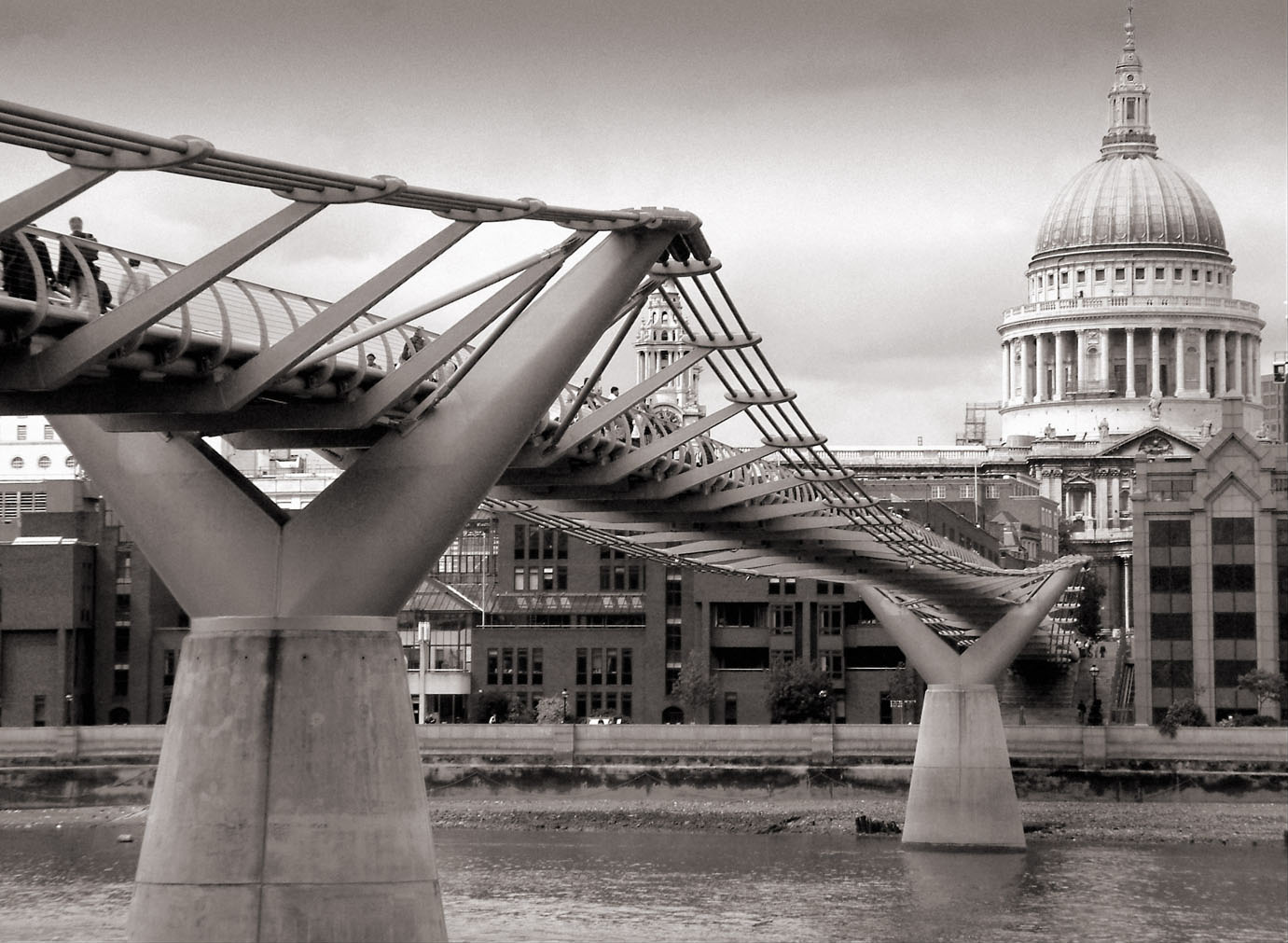
The Millennium Footbridge with St Paul's Cathedral in the background

Historical records state that the towpath started at Putney. Downstream of here sailing, sculling and rowing, and following the current (or rising and falling tide) were the means of movement until the 19th century, Thames sailing barges being typical. Moderately straight lengths of the tideway are often called reaches, as they can be sailed without tacking. Crossing the river was more of a priority, as evidenced by the many watermen's stairs giving watermen and passengers access to the tidal river. Thames steamers became more common for transport on the tidal Thames from 1815 until the railways dominated public transport. Falling income from river traffic and disputes over the construction of Victoria Embankment because of Crown Estate ownership of the tidal riverbed led to the City of London's seceding management of their part of the river to the Thames Conservancy in 1857; and the section below Teddington was further passed on to the Port of London Authority in 1908. Construction of riverside buildings and structures often meant embanking the tidal Thames and acquiring riverbed ownership. The historical progression of so many construction works, is why there is not continuous foreshore access for a riverside path within the Port of London. Today, downstream of Putney, there are jetties and wharfs on both banks of the river, and sections of the Thames Path often have to divert away from the river around riverside buildings. There are also many docks, most of them downstream of Tower Bridge.

In central London, there is much of interest. The Thames Path is one of the Mayor of London's strategic walking routes. The Thames Path Cycle Route is a black-signposted route that follows the river between Putney Bridge in the west and Greenwich in the east. It mostly follows the Thames Path, but diverges in various sections, especially where the path follows a footpath-only route. It also links National Cycle Route 1 (east of London) with National Cycle Route 4 (west of London).

== Route ==
The route of the Thames Path can be divided into these sections:

- Thames Head (source of the river west of Cricklade) to Oxford (54 mi or 87 km): a generally rural, agricultural area. The path makes significant diversions away from the river (in order going downstream) at Ewen, Ashton Keynes, Cricklade, Castle Eaton and Upper Inglesham because of the lack of a public path alongside the river until reaching the towpath at Lechlade (23 mi or 37 km); from Lechlade to Oxford there is only one significant diversion from the river, at Stanton Harcourt as there is now no ferry at Bablock Hythe.

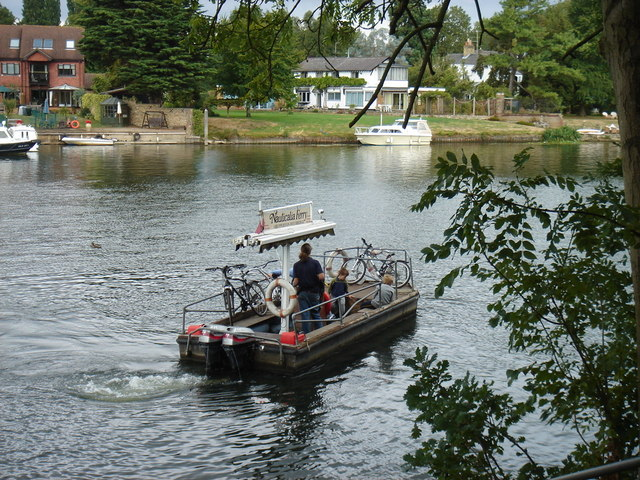
The Shepperton to Weybridge Ferry reopened 1986

- Oxford to Henley-on-Thames (51 mi or 82 km): passing through Abingdon, Dorchester, Wallingford, Streatley and Reading. The path makes significant diversions away from the river (in order going downstream) at Abingdon, Shillingford, Moulsford, Whitchurch-on-Thames, Purley-on-Thames, Shiplake and Aston – all because of the lack of ferries allowing the towpath to cross the river. In addition a short section in Wallingford goes behind houses, as the towpath used to cross at Chalmore Lock, removed in 1883.
- Henley to Windsor: (23 mi or 37 km): through Marlow and Maidenhead. The path makes a significant diversion away from the river past Cookham Lock due to the lack of three ferries and public access to the towpath at Cliveden. In addition there is a short diversion from the river through back streets in Marlow town centre, and a short section in Bourne End goes behind fenced riverside gardens as the modern footbridge is not aligned with the former ferry.
- Windsor to Richmond (28 mi or 45 km): along the bank opposite Home Park, Windsor; past Runnymede; through Hampton Court Park. The path does not leave the river apart from the short stretch where no public path exists at Datchet. It is also necessary to take a diversion through Shepperton and across Walton Bridge if not using the Shepperton to Weybridge Ferry. The river level is tidal and maintained at or above half tide between Teddington and Richmond locks.
- Richmond to Woolwich (29 mi or 47 km): passing Kew Gardens, the Wetlands Centre at Barnes, the end point of the Beverley Brook Walk, and Fulham Palace then through London, using parkland (e.g., Battersea Park) to continue beside the river. Through most of the section, the Thames Path is actually two paths downstream of Teddington Lock, one on either side of the Tideway. The path often diverts away from the river around riverside buildings.

The path has been diverted between Richmond and Brentford for an extended period.

- Woolwich to Crayford Ness, just beyond Erith (9 mi or 14 km), connecting with the London Outer Orbital Path. This is considered an extension of the Thames Path (as recognised by the Ramblers Association) and was opened in 2001, but is not part of the National Trail. It has its own Thames Barge symbol, and is sometimes referred to as the Thames Path Southeast Extension. The path often diverts away from the river around riverside buildings.

== Thames crossings ==
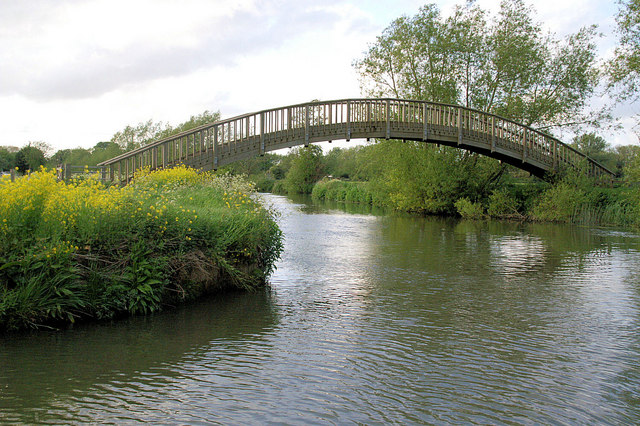
Bloomers Hole Footbridge, built in 2000 in commemoration of the Millennium for the Thames Path

The list below gives the points where the Thames Path crosses the river between Cricklade and Teddington. Above Cricklade, the Thames is a stream and in some places there may be no water except after rain. Below Teddington there are paths on both sides of the river until the Greenwich foot tunnel, after which the path is only on the south.

The list is in downstream order. The letter in brackets indicates whether the path downstream of that point takes the northern or southern bank (using north or south in reference to the river as a whole, rather than at that specific point).

- Cricklade (S)
- Eysey Footbridge (N)
- Water Eaton House Bridge (S)
- Bloomers Hole Footbridge (N)
- Radcot Bridge (S)
- Rushey Lock (N)
- Shifford Lockcut footbridge (S)
- Newbridge, Oxfordshire (N)
- Pinkhill Lock (S)
- Fiddler's Island (N)
- Osney Bridge (S)
- Abingdon Lock (N) (river flows west here)
- Clifton Hampden Bridge (S)
- Day's Lock (N)
- Benson Lock (S)
- Goring and Streatley Bridge (N)
- Whitchurch Bridge (S)
- Sonning Bridge (N)
- Henley Bridge (S)
- Temple Footbridge (N)
- Bourne End Railway Bridge (S)
- Maidenhead Bridge (N)
- Windsor Bridge (S)
- Victoria Bridge, Datchet (N)
- Albert Bridge, Datchet (S)
- Staines Bridge (N)
- Shepperton to Weybridge Ferry (S)
- Hampton Court Bridge (N)
- Kingston Bridge, London (S)
- Teddington Lock Footbridges

Bridges and ferries are listed in full under Crossings of the River Thames. The river can be crossed at about a third of the locks, although some of these crossings are not part of the Thames Path.
