= Thomas Page (engineer) =

British civil engineer

Thomas Page (26 October 1803 – 8 January 1877) was an English architect and civil engineer who was responsible for the design and construction of many bridges, including Westminster Bridge and the first Chelsea Bridge (both crossing the River Thames)

== Early life ==
Page was born in London on 26 October 1803. The education he received whilst growing up in Romaldkirk by the River Tees) was designed to prepare him for life as a sailor. However, the engineer Thomas Tredgold suggested that Page become a civil engineer, advice that Page followed.

== Career ==
Page worked in Leeds and then moved to the London office of Edward Blore before working on the Thames Tunnel from 1835, initially as an assistant to Marc Isambard Brunel before becoming acting engineer in 1836 upon the retirement of Richard Beamish. His design for the Thames Embankment from Westminster to Blackfriars was recommended by the Commissioners for Metropolis Improvements in 1842, and he became consulting engineer for the Office of Woods and Forests, including responsibility for the Thames Embankment Office. In this role, his approval was required for any railway works affecting Crown land, and he would sometimes suggest changes (as happened at the Old Deer Park, Richmond, and at Windsor Home Park). The Thames Embankment project failed to progress after disagreements between the Crown Estate and the City of London corporation about riparian rights.

In 1845, Page drew plans for a new railway terminus to be built in the Thames between Hungerford Bridge and Waterloo Bridge; it was never built. Other proposals included a railway tunnel underneath London Docks to connect the London to Brighton line with the Eastern Counties Railway (1845), docks for Holyhead and Porth Dinllaen in north Wales, which were competing for the Irish mail traffic (1846) and docks for Swansea (1847). He then designed and built the Albert and Victoria Bridges in Datchet, with new roads between Windsor and Frogmore (1848–49). He also designed Westminster Bridge (built between 1854 and 1862), the first Chelsea Bridge (opened 1858), and Lendal Bridge in York (opened 1863), and was responsible for the plans for the embankment and road on the stretch of the Thames between Vauxhall Bridge and Battersea Bridge (opened 1869). In 1870, addressing the Society of Arts, he put forward the idea of a submerged tube to act as a tunnel between England and France. Page died in Paris on 8 January 1877.
