= Datchet Bridge =

Road bridge which crossed the River Thames at Datchet

Coordinates: 51.4819°N 0.5826°W

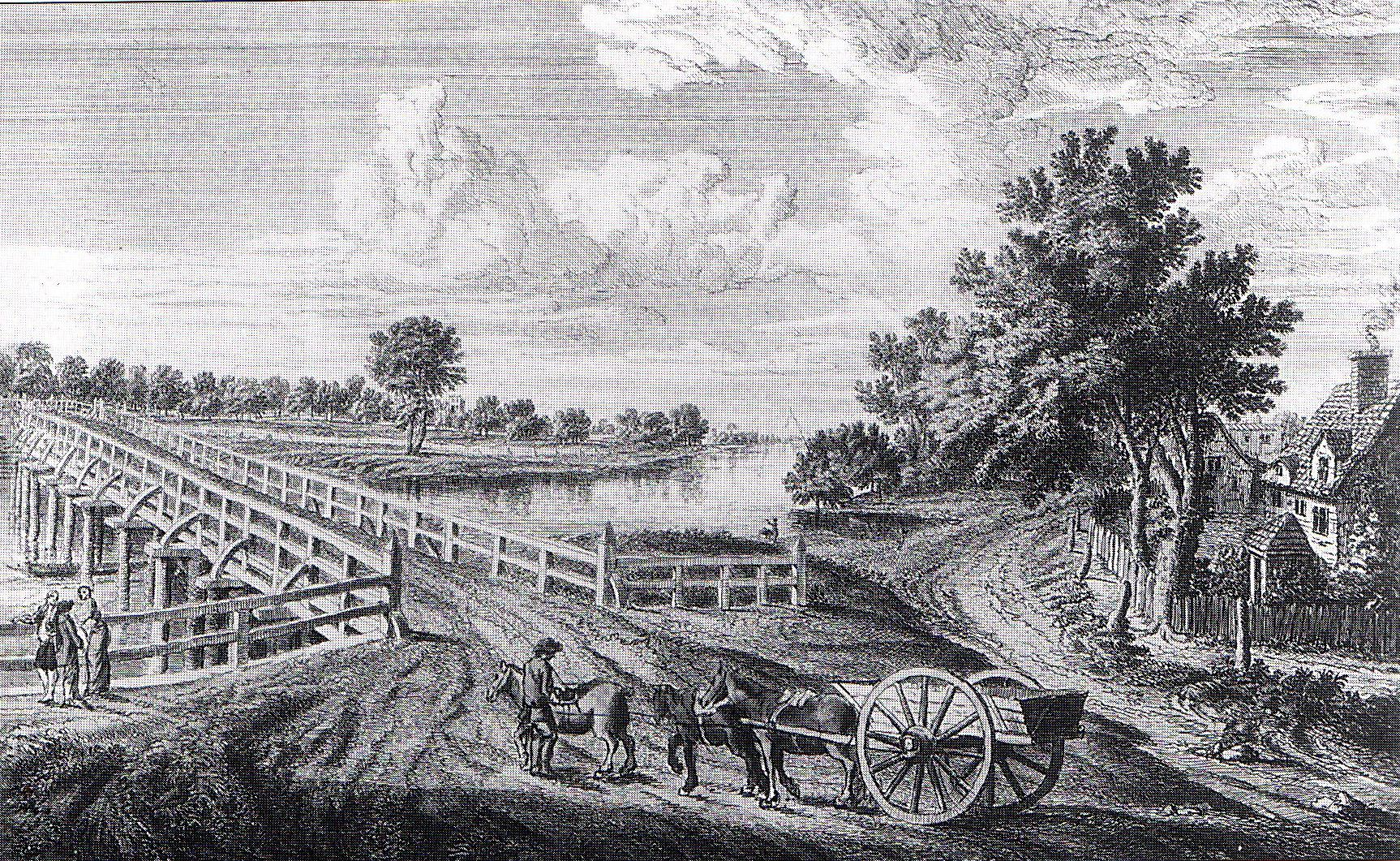
Engraving of 1750 showing the first Datchet Bridge from the Buckinghamshire bank

Datchet Bridge, also known as The Divided Bridge, was a road bridge which crossed the River Thames at Datchet from 1706 until it was demolished in 1848. It was situated on the reach between Old Windsor Lock and Romney Lock and linked Windsor on the Berkshire bank to Datchet on the Buckinghamshire side. The bridge replaced a ferry service which had operated at the site since at least the middle of the 13th century.

The first Datchet Bridge was a wooden bridge commissioned by Queen Anne as the crossing was a convenient back-way to Windsor Castle. Responsibility for the upkeep and maintenance of the crossing later passed to the counties of Berkshire and Buckinghamshire over whose boundary the bridge spanned. There followed many decades of dispute between the counties over who should pay for what. This culminated in 1836 with each county deciding to build their own half, in different materials and not touching in the middle. The resulting "crazy erection", Buckinghamshire's side in wood and Berkshire's in iron, known as The Divided Bridge, was demolished in 1848 and is the only case on the Thames where an established bridge crossing site has completely disappeared.

== Background ==
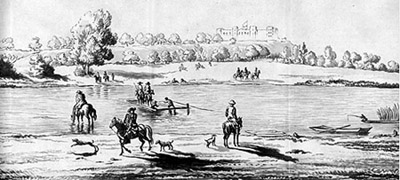
Datchet Mead and Datchet Ferry in 1686 with Windsor Castle in the background

Datchet on the north bank of the River Thames has existed as a settlement since before 990 but the first recorded mention of a river crossing is in 1224 when Henry III gave John le Passir a "great oak" with which to make a boat for "passage of Datchet". In 1278 Edward I paid for William of Eton to a build a "great barge" for Datchet Ferry. Although the Crown had provided for the vessels, the right to operate the ferry and collect tolls sat with the Lord of the manor of Datchet. This continued until 1680 when the then Lord of the manor, Colonel Andrew Pitcairn Wheeler, sold the Manor of Datchet to Budd Wase but kept back the ferry rights which he subsequently mortgaged for £1000 (equivalent to £192,000 today). In 1699 Wheeler wrote to William III complaining that a wall built by the King along the Windsor bank was adversely affecting the ferry trade. To settle the complaint the Crown purchased the ferry rights from Colonel Wheeler for £7000 (equivalent to £1,129,000 today).

The crossing was important to the Crown as the road through Datchet and across the Thames provided a convenient short route from London to Windsor Castle and the ferry was much used by Royalty and courtiers. Privy Purse records show two payments from Elizabeth of York to the Datchet ferryman in 1502 and similarly from Princess Mary in 1522 and her father Henry VIII between 1530 and 1532. In Elias Ashmole's account of the 1520 Procession of the order of the Garter he describes how Queen Catherine after watching the procession returned to Windsor Castle from Colnbrook by way of "the fery [sic] next way to the castle." The ferry however did not always provide a quick and efficient service. In 1678 the ferryman, Matthew Hale, received a formal rebuke from Charles II's Secretary of State, Henry Coventry, for unduly delaying a Royal Messenger. Coventry warned Hale in no uncertain terms:

"You cannot but know it is your duty, whenever any messenger or express rides on the King's Service, to give immediate passage on demand, whether by night or day. Therefore, let me have no more of these complaints, for, if I have, you must hear from me in another matter."

— Rebuke of ferryman Mathew Hale by Secretary of State Henry Coventry

Despite Coventry's warning Royal dissatisfaction with the inefficient service provided by the Hale Family, who by 1706 had kept the ferry for over 150 years, continued to grow. This culminated in the decision by Queen Anne to provide a fixed bridge crossing on the site.

== Queen Anne's bridge ==
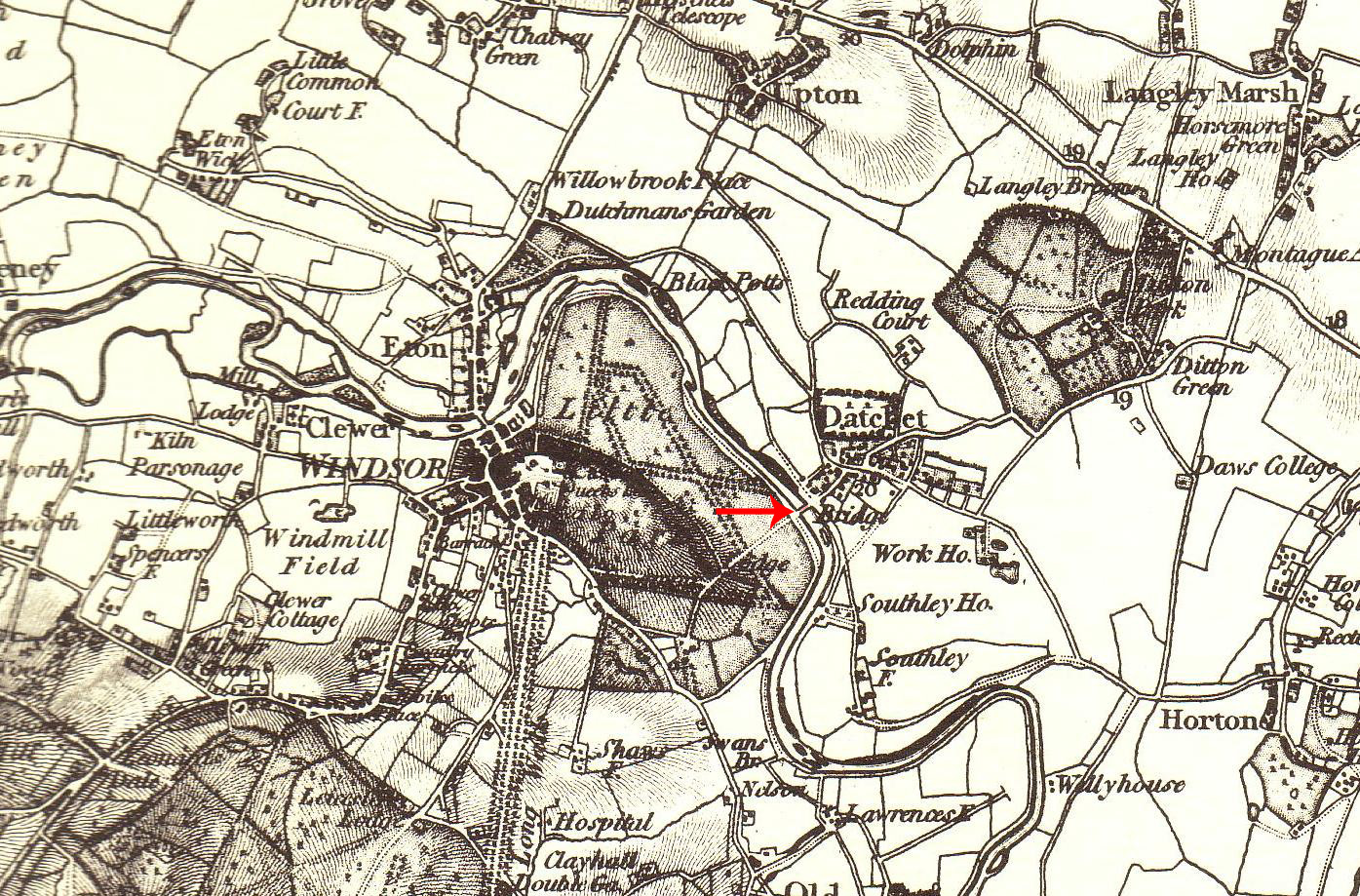
1822 Ordnance Survey map showing the location of the river crossing at Datchet

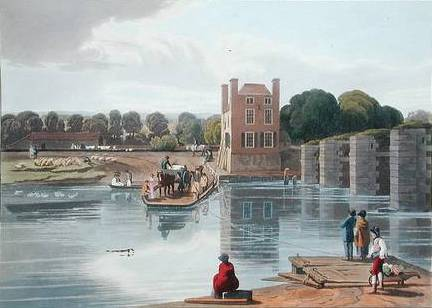
Datchet Ferry in 1811 showing the abandoned 1770 bridge just prior to its rebuilding in 1812

In 1706 a wooden bridge was built by order of Queen Anne to replace the ferry between Datchet, Buckinghamshire and Windsor, Berkshire. It was made of oak provided by the Surveyor General of Woods South of the Trent, Edward Wilcox, who was ordered to fell "sufficient non-navy timber" from the Royal forest "for the better convenience of our passage from our Castle at Windsor". The building work was supervised by the Surveyor General, Samuel Travers and the final cost was £1000 (equivalent to £207,000 today) The better convenience of passage was further enhanced by Queen Anne's intimate friend Sarah Churchill, Duchess of Marlborough and her husband the first Duke who then lived at Langley and who had a carriage drive built from their house, over the bridge and on to Windsor Castle.

Unlike the upstream toll bridges at Windsor and Maidenhead, the crossing at Datchet was toll-free for both River and road and quickly became a popular crossing. Seeking compensation for loss of income on their bridges, the corporations of Windsor and Maidenhead made claims to the Treasury. In 1708 Windsor was granted an ex-gratia payment of £55 (equivalent to £11400 today) plus £25 and £20 to two tenants (equivalent to £4800 and £3900 respectively). Maidenhead's complaint, not made until 1714, was noted but no compensation paid.

The bridge was initially maintained by the Crown which paid £800 (equivalent to £155,000 today) for repairs in 1737 and in 1770 replaced the original all-wood structure with a bridge of ten wooden arches on stone piers. By 1794 the bridge was "absolutely dangerous for carriages to pass over it and a stone one [was] now in contemplation." Later the same year the central arches of the new bridge collapsed during heavy flooding and King George III deciding that he did not wish to finance the rebuilding instead instated a temporary free ferry. There followed many years of wrangling between the Crown and the counties of Berkshire and Buckinghamshire over who should bear the cost of the building and maintenance of the bridge as the county boundary ran down the centre of the channel of the Thames thus cutting the bridge in half. The matter was forced by the intervention of John Richards, the Rector of Datchet who was also a lawyer; Richards took legal action and the resulting judgement from the King's Bench in 1809 was that the two counties must equally share the rebuilding costs, a total of £2,375 each (equivalent to £165,900 today). The counties, forced to co-operate, built a new wooden bridge on the old stone piers which was opened by Queen Charlotte and Princess Elizabeth on 4 December 1812.

== The Divided Bridge ==
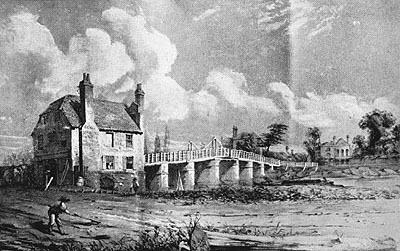
The Divided Bridge in 1847 from the Berkshire bank

The co-operation was short-lived and arguments over maintenance started again in 1834 when the Buckinghamshire side needed repairs and Berkshire refused to contribute. Lack of maintenance led to the bridge collapsing once more in 1836 and the counties came up with the unique solution of each building their own half. Buckinghamshire decided to rebuild with wooden railings whilst Berkshire built its half in iron suspended by chains. Kelly's Directory of 1847 noted:

"Datchet is separated from Windsor by the river Thames, over which is a very singular bridge; one half of it is kept in repair by the county of Bucks and the other half by Berks. The former has a wooden railing and the latter an iron one, suspended by chains, but neither the Bucks nor Berks sides touch each other."

Even during the building the counties would not work together and had to be ordered by the Lord Chancellor to "proceed in such a manner as not to impede each other". Consequently when the bridge was finished the two sides did not touch in the middle with Berkshire's final span being cantilevered out from the last Berkshire stone pier thus needing no support from the Buckinghamshire side. The result was an unsatisfactory, ungainly structure, sarcastically noted on opening as having "scarce a bridge upon the River Thames which surpasses it". The centre gap was apparent during the Divided Bridge's whole lifetime and lacking structural integrity the "hideous monstrosity" quickly became unsafe:

"It was no wonder that when Wombwell took his caravans across the crazy erection, the elephant-van broke through and the beast in it nearly came to an untimely end."

The dispute between the counties was resolved once and for all in 1848 when the Windsor Castle Act 1848 decreed the dismantling of the Divided Bridge and the building of two new road bridges, Victoria Bridge slightly upstream, and Albert Bridge slightly downstream. Both new bridges opened in 1851. Once the Divided Bridge was demolished the old Windsor to Datchet road was rerouted over Victoria Bridge and the Berkshire side became part of the private grounds of Windsor Castle. This is the only case on the entire Thames where a main bridge crossing has completely disappeared.

== Legacy ==
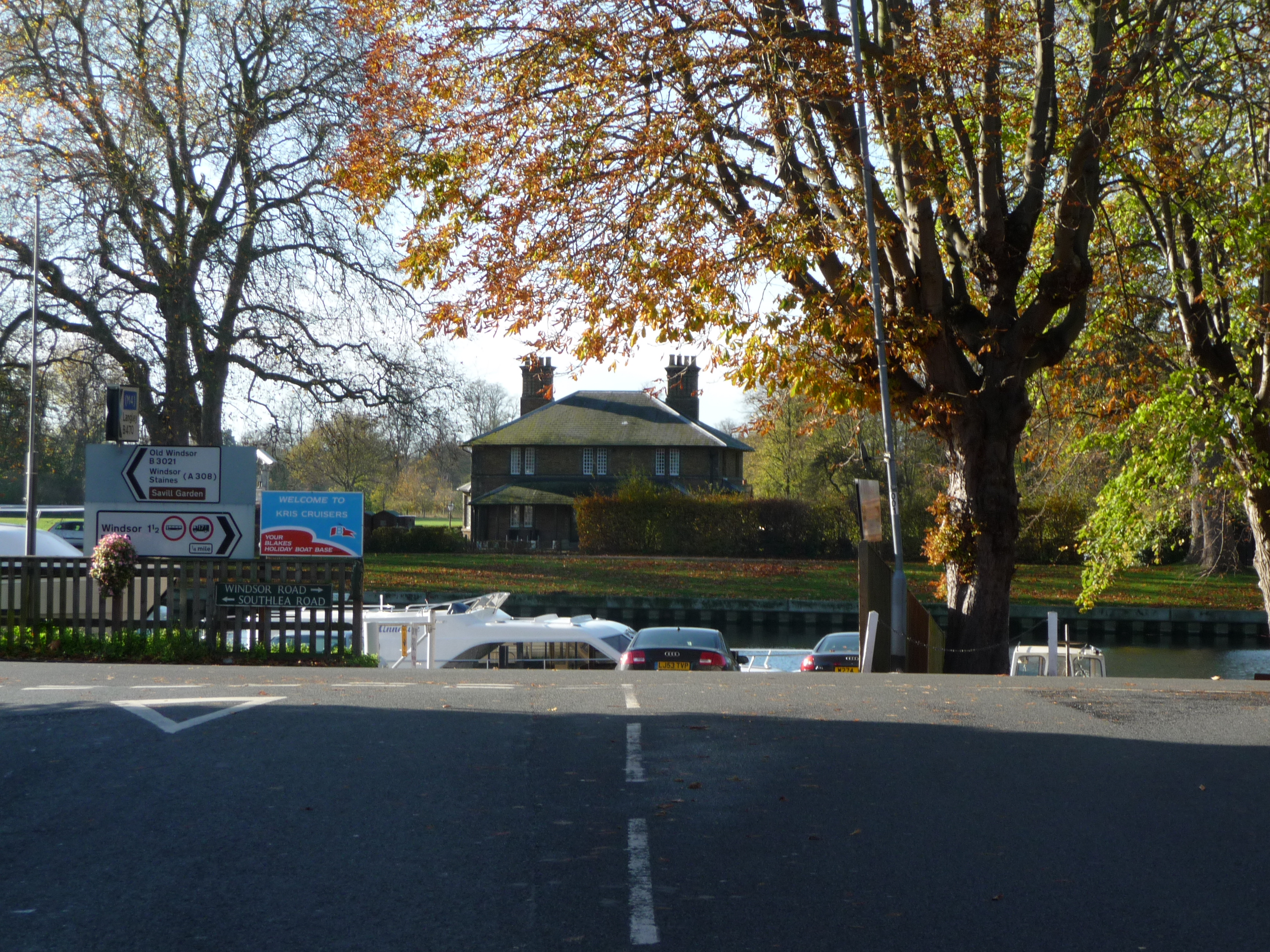
Site of Datchet Bridge looking south-west down Datchet High Street towards the Berkshire bank and Windsor Great Park

A small plaque erected by the Datchet Parish Council in 2000 is the only reminder of the Divided Bridge. Datchet High Street which once continued on over the bridge to Berkshire ends abruptly at the Thames and the bank on the Buckinghamshire side is now occupied by a marina car park. The Crown and Angel public house on the Berkshire bank depicted in many of the contemporary drawings of the bridge was demolished at the same time as the bridge; a Victorian estate cottage now stands its place.

== See also ==
- Crossings of the River Thames
