= Windsor Bridge =

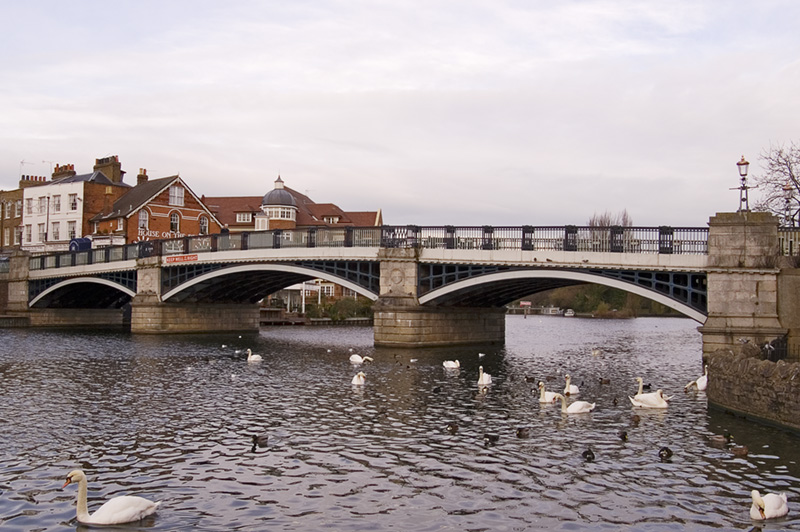
- Windsor Bridge
- Coordinates: 51°29′09″N 0°36′30″W
- Carries: Thames Path, Pedestrians and cycles
- Crosses: River Thames
- Locale: Windsor, Berkshire, England, UK
- Official name: Windsor Town Bridge
- Maintained by: Royal Borough of Windsor and Maidenhead

Characteristics
- Design: Arch bridge
- Material: Iron and granite
- Height: 13 feet 2 inches (4.01 m)
- No. of spans: 3
- Piers in water: 2

History
- Opened: 1 June 1824

Statistics
- Toll: Abolished 1897

Location
- Interactive map of Windsor Bridge

The Windsor Bridge or Windsor Town Bridge, an iron and granite arch bridge over the River Thames, connects the towns of Windsor and Eton in the English county of Berkshire. The Thames Path crosses the river here. The bridge carries pedestrian and cycle traffic, and crosses the Thames just above Romney Lock. It is a Grade II listed structure.

== History ==
It is likely that the first bridge on this site was built in the 12th century AD. By 1172 it is recorded that Osbert de Bray derived over £4 from tolls levied on vessels passing beneath the bridge. In 1242, permission was granted for oak trees to be felled in Windsor Forest for the purpose of constructing a new bridge between Windsor and Eton. By 1819 the wooden bridge, presumably rebuilt many times over its life, had deteriorated and it was decided to build a new bridge in new materials.

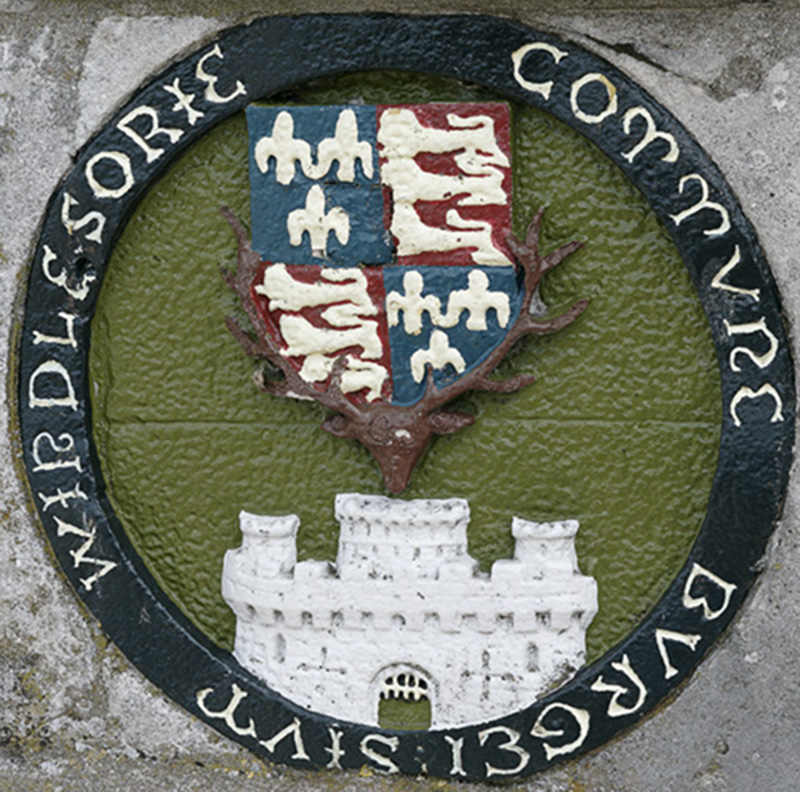
Plaque on Windsor Town Bridge.

== Description ==
Construction on the current bridge was started in 1822 and it opened on 1 June 1824. The bridge has three arches, each comprising seven cast iron segments, and is supported in mid-stream by two granite piers. Built as a road bridge, tolls were originally levied on traffic crossing the bridge. Following protests and a court case, The Mayor &c. of New Windsor and ano. v Joseph Taylor, which went to the highest court at the time, these tolls were scrapped in 1897. In the 20th century the bridge carried the A332, the busy main road between Slough and Windsor.

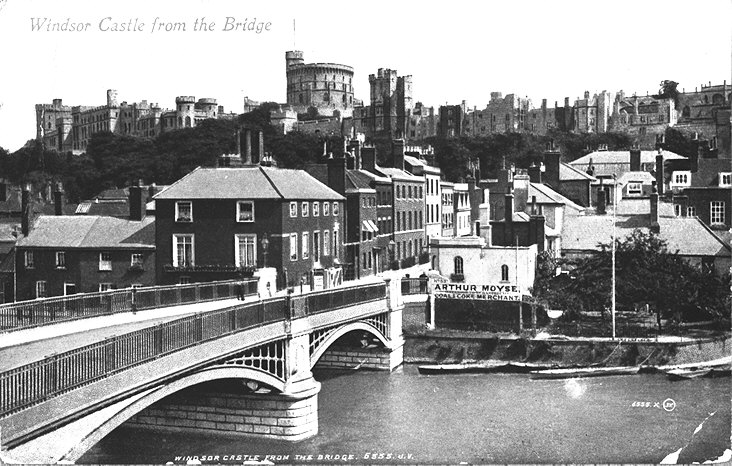
Windsor Bridge in 1866.

In 1970, cracks were discovered in some of the cast iron segments, and despite local protests, but with almost equal support, it was decided to close the bridge to all motorised traffic. All such traffic between Windsor and Eton must now travel via the Queen Elizabeth Bridge on the Royal Windsor Way (formerly the Windsor and Eton relief road) 0.25 miles (0.40 km) to the west. For those approaching from Old Windsor or Runnymede, the Albert Bridge provides an alternative route via Datchet's High Street.

In 2002 the bridge was refurbished, with repairs to the structure and new parapets including integral lighting. The bridge deck was replaced using Yorkstone and seating areas provided. The bridge remains in use by pedestrians and cyclists only; it provides an excellent walking route from central Windsor to Eton's High Street, and a good viewing spot for both the river and Windsor Castle.

=== Proximity to railway stations ===
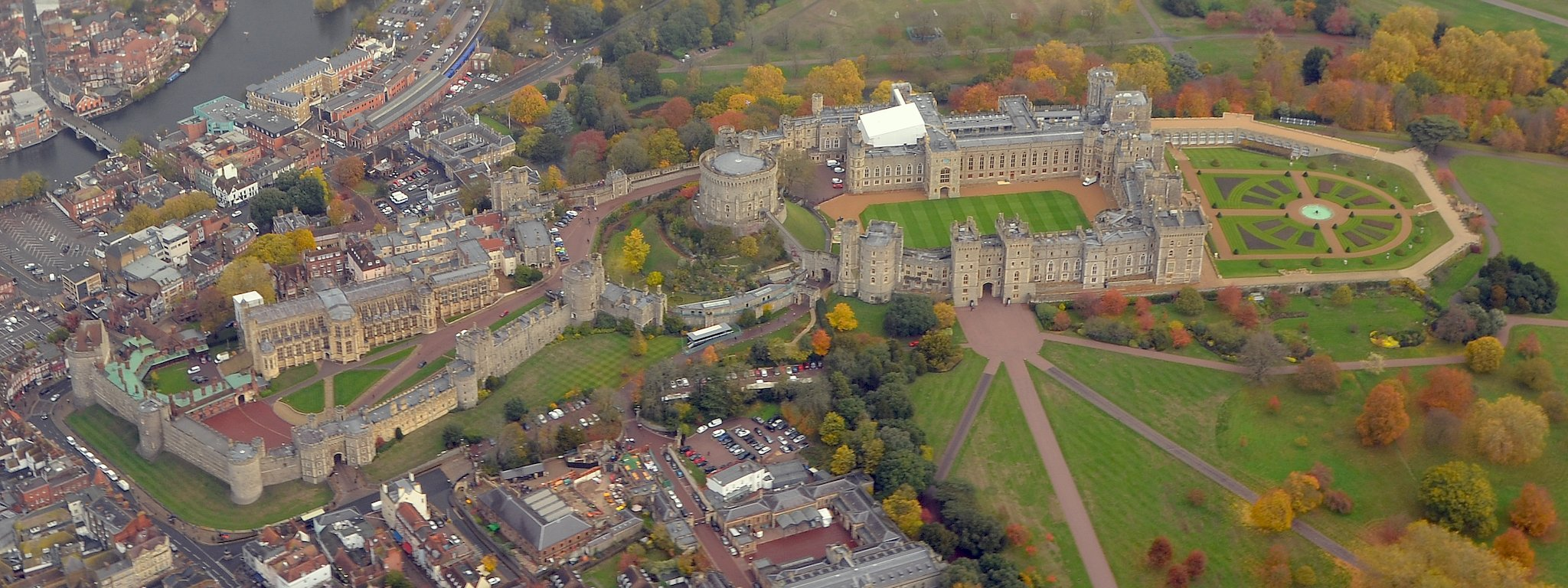
Aerial view of the Windsor Bridge (left) and the Riverside railway station (right)

About 80 metres (260 ft) east of the bridge is Windsor & Eton Riverside railway station, served by South Western Railway trains to London Waterloo, while Windsor & Eton Central railway station, up the hill 200 metres (660 ft) to the south-west, is served by Great Western Railway trains to Slough for connecting services to London Paddington.

== See also ==
- Crossings of the River Thames

Next bridge upstream	River Thames	Next bridge downstream
Windsor Railway Bridge (rail)	Windsor Bridge; Grid reference SU967772	Black Potts Railway Bridge (rail)
Next bridge upstream	Thames Path	Next bridge downstream
Northern bank Maidenhead Bridge	Windsor Bridge; Grid reference SU9672677245	Southern bank Victoria Bridge
