= Maidenhead Bridge =

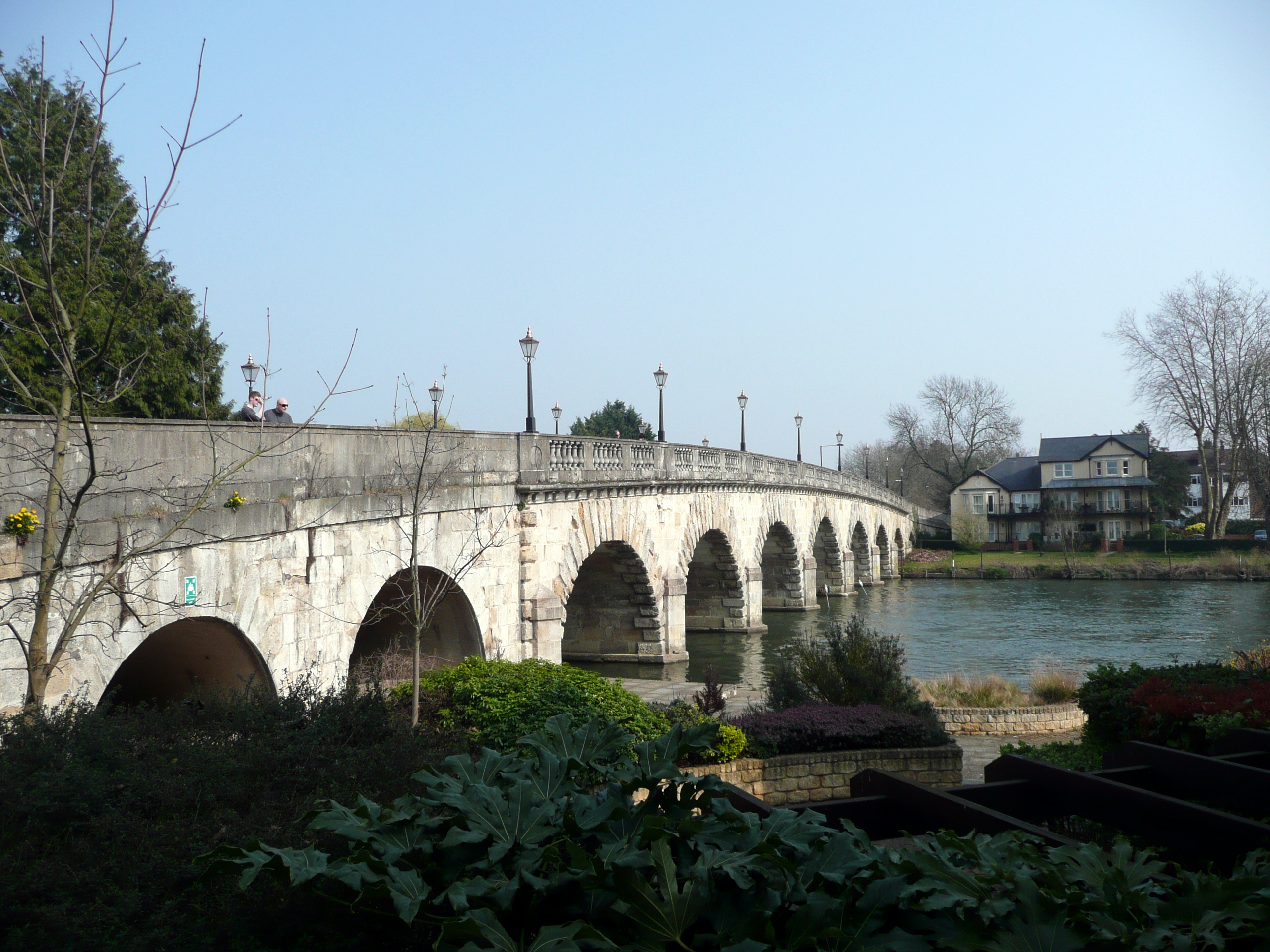
- Maidenhead Bridge in 2011, looking east towards Taplow
- Coordinates: 51°31′26″N 0°42′07″W
- Carries: A4 road, Thames Path
- Crosses: River Thames
- Locale: Maidenhead, Berkshire

Characteristics
- Design: Arch
- Material: Stone
- Height: 18 ft 7 in (5.66 m)
- No. of spans: 13
- Piers in water: 5

History
- Designer: Robert Taylor
- Opened: 1777

Statistics
- Toll: Abolished 1903

Location
- Interactive map of Maidenhead Bridge

Maidenhead Bridge is a Grade I listed bridge carrying the A4 road over the River Thames between Maidenhead, Berkshire and Taplow, Buckinghamshire, England. It crosses the Thames on the reach above Bray Lock, about half a mile below Boulter's Lock. The Thames Path crosses the river here.

== History ==
The first bridge was built of wood in 1280 in what was then the hamlet of South Ellington. The Great West Road to Reading, Gloucester and Bristol was diverted over the new bridge – previously it kept to the north bank crossed the Thames by ford at Cookham – and mediaeval Maidenhead grew up around it. Within a few years a wharf was constructed next to the bridge and the South Ellington name was dropped with the area becoming known as Maidenhythe (literally meaning "new wharf"). The earliest record of this name change is in the Bray Court manorial rolls of 1296.

In 1297 a grant of pontage for the charge of tolls for repairs to the bridge was awarded and a replacement bridge was constructed. The event is recorded in the Patent Rolls of Edward I as a...

"grant at the instance of Will, de Berford in aid of the bridge of Maidenhead which is almost broken down, of pontage (tolls) for three years, to be taken at the hands of two good and lawful men appointed by him."

In 1335 another three years pontage was granted to the "baliffs and good men of Maidenhythe" on wares passing under or over the bridge.

Only a century later the bridge had again fallen into disrepair and during the reign of Henry VI was so unsafe that most travellers preferred to cross using the ferry. Since it was first built, the bridge had a hermitage and chapel attached so that travellers could pray for safe passage over the bridge or to give thanks for a safe crossing. Another chapel in the town lent its name to The Guild of St Andrew and St Mary Magdelene which was formed in 1452 to repair the bridge and to maintain the chapel after which it was named. The guild levied tolls for use of the bridge and although it was dissolved by Edward VI during the Reformation in 1547 it was reinstated in 1581 when Queen Elizabeth I granted Maidenhead a charter of incorporation and the guild's bridge maintenance duties were transferred to the new corporation who employed one warden, two bridgemasters and eight burgesses dedicated to the upkeep of the bridge and the collection of tolls. The corporation was specifically not permitted to rebuild the chapel but were allowed to levy toll and hold a weekly market and two annual fairs. The charter was renewed by James I who added a Whit Wednesday fair and the right to take three oaks per year from the Royal Forest of Bray.

During the Civil War the bridge again fell into disrepair. Edward Montagu, 2nd Earl of Manchester, a commander of Parliamentary forces reported on 25 September 1644 that his army was "constrained to wait at Uxbridge as Maidenhead Bridge is broken". Colonel Whitcote the Parliamentary Commander at Maidenhead acquired seven oaks with which to make repairs but by 1660 it was again in a dangerous state.

The bridge wardens petitioned the restored monarch – Charles II – in 1672 but had to wait until 1679 for a warrant for 20 oaks to be issued. On the accession of James II all of the benefits granted by James I were restored and the senior bridge warden was made mayor. When William of Orange landed in 1688 the town, still loyal to James followed the order of the king and broke the bridge to prevent William crossing however their efforts were cosmetic and William's army was able to march across it a matter of days later.

Although James' restoration of benefits included the annual quota of oaks, in 1714 the corporation complained to the Lord Treasurer about the poor quality of the trees. The corporation also claimed that bridge revenues were adversely affected by the opening of a toll-free bridge in Datchet but their request for compensation was refused. A further eighteen years passed before the treasury granted a warrant for 23 oaks.

== Present structure ==
In 1750 the bridge was again in a state of disrepair and a contract for "great works" was awarded to Mr Stiff Leadbetter of Eaton. The estimated cost was £600 and the actual cost on the final bill was £794 9s 2d – equivalent to £152,000 today. This prompted the corporation to consider the large ongoing cost of maintaining the old structure and decision was made to build an entirely new bridge.

Two designs were submitted. Mr Fuller White proposed a timber structure and Robert Taylor a thirteen-arch Portland stone bridge. The corporation preferred Taylor's design but demanded that the original cost of £25,000 (equivalent to £3.65 million today) be reduced. Taylor therefore modified the design so that only the river arches were of Portland stone, the rest in brick.

Maidenhead Bridge Act 1772
- Act of Parliament
- Parliament of Great Britain
- Long title: An Act for building a Bridge over the River Thames, near the Town of Maidenhead, in the County of Berks.
- Citation: 12 Geo. 3. c. 41
- Territorial extent: Great Britain

Dates
- Royal assent: 21 May 1772
- Commencement: 21 January 1772 (Note: Start of session.)
- Repealed: 31 October 1904
Other legislation
Repealed by	Maidenhead Bridge Act 1904

Status: Repealed

Text of statute as originally enacted

The rebuilding was authorised by an act of Parliament, the Maidenhead Bridge Act 1772 (12 Geo. 3. c. 41) and Taylor's design was built by John Townsend of Oxford (builder of Swinford Bridge) at a total cost of £19,000 (equivalent to £2.69 million today). Works were delayed until a temporary ferry had been constructed and the foundation stone was laid by the Mayor of Maidenhead on 19 October 1772. After delays caused by ice, frost and flooding the centre arch was completed in 1775. The new bridge was finished and finally opened for traffic in 1777.

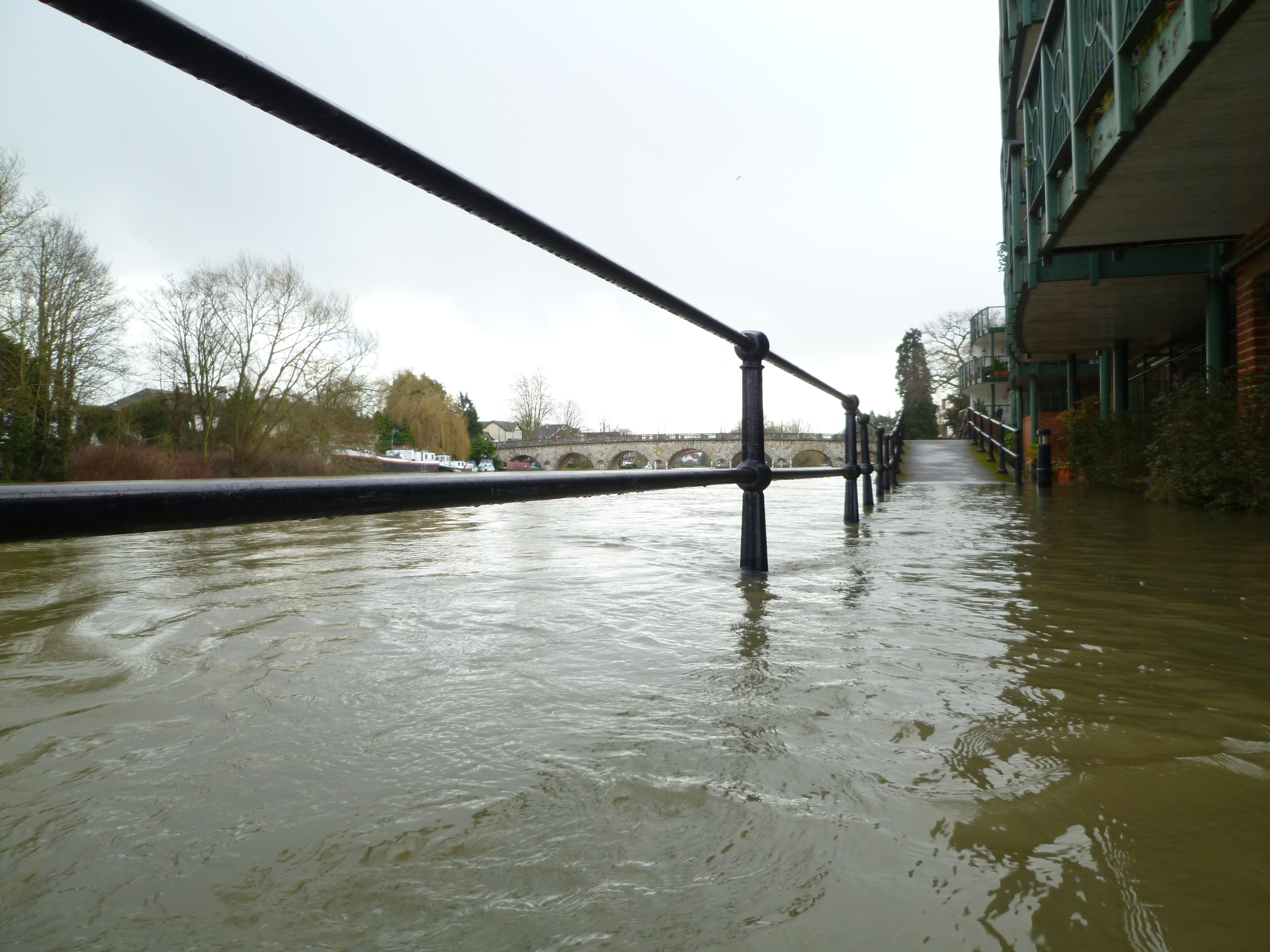
Flooding at Maidenhead Bridge, February 2014

In 1966 Nikolaus Pevsner recorded it in his Buildings of Berkshire as "a beautiful piece of 1772–7.... seven main water-arches with rock rustication on the voussoirs... fine balustrade".

== Tolls ==
Throughout its history the tolls on Maidenhead Bridge had been considered high and were the subject of disquiet. In 1337 the toll for a loaded barge to pass under or a loaded cart to pass over was 1 old penny (equivalent to £10 today). By the 1830s the bridge was recorded as raising £1,245 per annum in tolls (equivalent to £128,000 today). It remained a toll bridge until 1903, after an Eton man named Joseph Taylor, who had already made a successful legal challenge against the tolls on Windsor Bridge petitioned the Charity Commissioners in 1902 that the toll was illegal as the funds raised had been used by the Maidenhead Corporation for purposes other than bridge maintenance – a fact freely admitted by the town clerk. The Charity Commission agreed that the toll money was being used illegally and the corporation agreed cease collecting the tolls after 31 October 1903. A large crowd gathered at the bridge and in the first moments of 1 November 1903 they removed the toll gates and threw them into the Thames. The tolls in 1903 were 1 shilling (equivalent to £13.00 today) for a coach and horses, sixpence (equivalent to £6.00 today) for a car and 10 old pence (equivalent to £11.00 today) for twenty sheep. The Maidenhead Bridge Act 1904 (4 Edw. 7. c. xcv) was passed to legally abolish the tolls.

In 1843 the Corporation of Maidenhead as owners of the turnpike toll-bridge sued the Great Western Railway for the maximum statutory compensation of £2,500 for loss of tolls in consequence of the construction of the London to Bristol main line taking traffic away from the toll bridge. The Great Western Railway defended the claim on the dubious grounds it had built its London terminus at Paddington, not Euston as originally authorised by its act of incorporation containing the provisions for compensation but they paid in full before trial whilst avoiding the payment of interest and costs on a technicality.

== Exhibition ==
In 2007, the bridge was the subject of a special exhibition to mark its 230th anniversary at Maidenhead Heritage Centre.

== See also ==
- List of crossings of the River Thames
- Grade I listed buildings in Berkshire
- Grade I listed buildings in Buckinghamshire

== Notes ==
Next bridge upstream	River Thames	Next bridge downstream
Taplow Bridge (pedestrian)	Maidenhead Bridge; Grid reference SU901810	Maidenhead Railway Bridge (rail)
Next bridge upstream	Thames Path	Next bridge downstream
southern bank Bourne End Railway Bridge	Maidenhead Bridge; Grid reference SU9014181356	northern bank Windsor Bridge
