= Windsor Castle Act 1848 =

Act of the Parliament of the United Kingdom

- Act of Parliament
- Parliament of the United Kingdom
- Long title: An Act to empower the Commissioners of Her Majesty's Woods to make certain Alterations and Improvements in the Approaches to the Castle and Town of Windsor.
- Citation: 11 & 12 Vict. c. 53
- Territorial extent: United Kingdom

Dates
- Royal assent: 14 August 1848
- Commencement: 14 August 1848 (Note: The Acts of Parliament (Commencement) Act 1793.)

Status: Current legislation

Text of statute as originally enacted

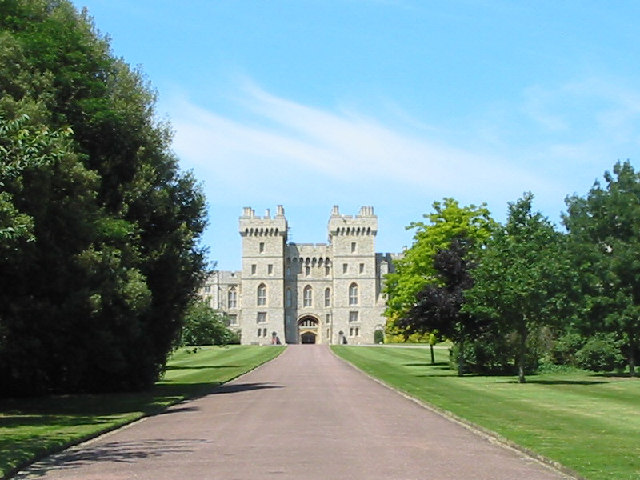
The Long Walk towards Windsor Castle in Windsor Great Park

The Windsor Castle Act 1848 (11 & 12 Vict. c. 53) is an act of the Parliament of the United Kingdom enacted for the British royal family that reformed land use and rights around Windsor Castle, in Berkshire. The act's main purpose was to create Home Park. All new roads and bridges were built by 1850. The result turned the former royal estate, which was known as Little Park, into the royal private estate of Home Park.

== Construction and completion ==
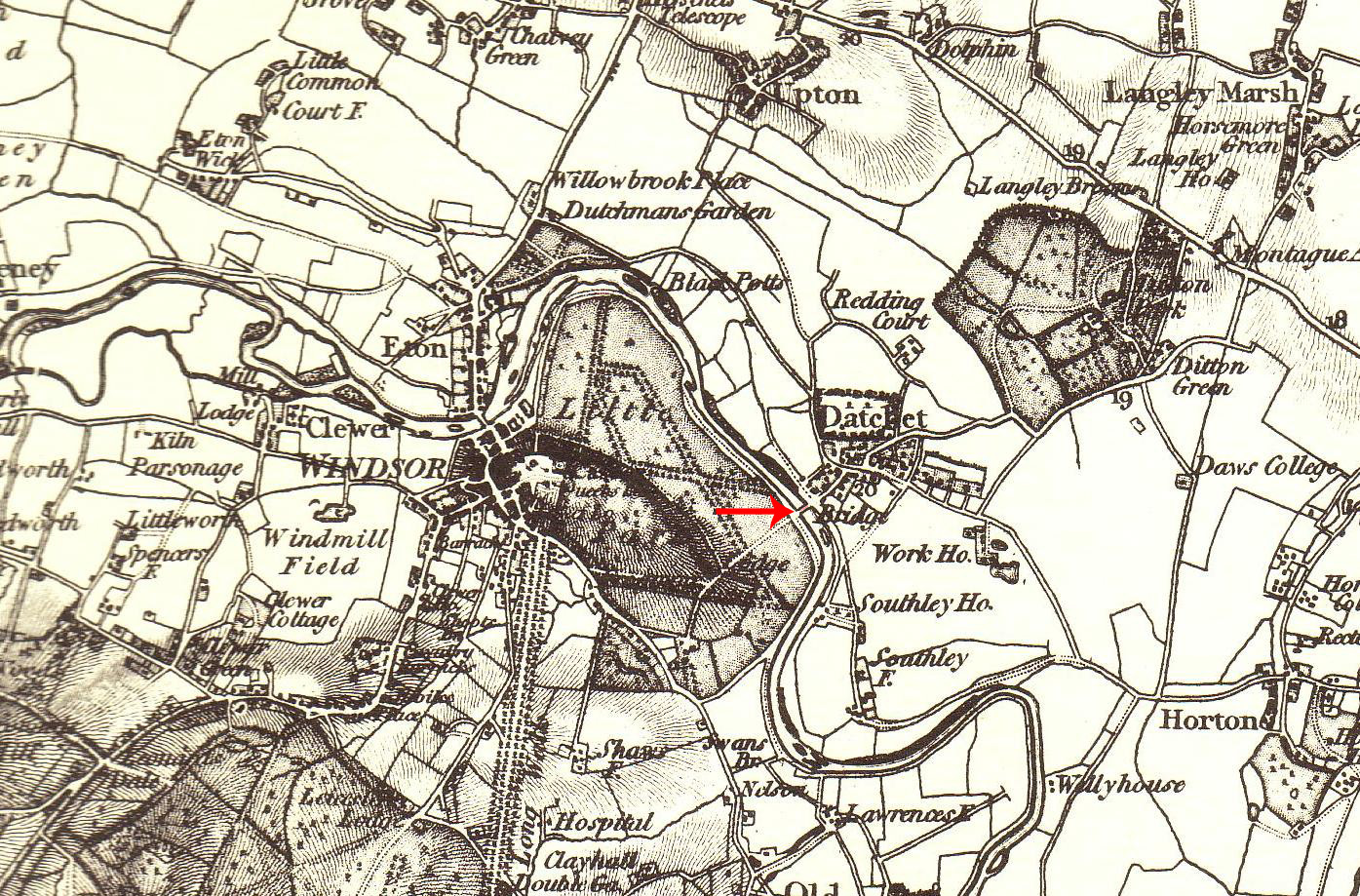
The 1856 First Series Ordnance Survey map still showed the former roads and bridges before the creation of Home Park and Windsor Great Park. (Red arrow shows the location of the former Datchet Bridge)

The act enacted various changes around Windsor in the light of the changing nature of Windsor Castle, the desire of Queen Victoria for greater privacy and the new railways being built in Berkshire at the time. Several new roads were built in the area and historic highways closed. Two new cast iron bridges were built over the River Thames to accommodate the changes.

Among the most notable changes was the demolition of Datchet Bridge over the River Thames. The crossing linked Windsor in Berkshire to Datchet, Buckinghamshire. Originally a ferry crossing, Queen Anne had a wooden bridge constructed in 1706. However, the crossing would later become a cause of financial contention between the counties of Berkshire and Buckinghamshire over its maintenance costs, resulting in its nickname, "The Divided Bridge". Under the Windsor Castle Act 1848, the bridge was demolished and the original Windsor Road between Datchet's High Street and Park Street, Windsor was closed. Victoria Bridge slightly upstream, and Albert Bridge slightly downstream were built to replace Datchet. Both new bridges opened in 1851. Old Windsor Road was replaced with a highway, 0.7 mi (1.1 km) to the south, which crossed the newly constructed Albert Bridge near Old Windsor. A new road around Windsor Castle to the north – which would later become known as the Edward VII Avenue – was built to connect the town to Victoria Bridge. The entire Berkshire side of the Thames (including the towpath) became part of the private grounds of Windsor Great Park. The demolition of Datchet Bridge remains the only case on the entire Thames where a main crossing has been completely removed and not replaced.

== Bibliography ==
- Rolt, L. T. C. (1951). The Thames From Mouth to Source. B. T. Batsford.
- Thacker, F. S. (1920). The Thames Highway: A History of the Locks and Weirs. Fred. S. Thacker.
- Tighe, Robert Richard; Davis, James Edward (1858). Annals of Windsor, being a history of the castle and town, with some account of Eton and places adjacent, volume II. London: Longman.
- Allison, Ronald; Riddell, Sarah (1991). The Royal Encyclopedia. Macmillan Press. ISBN 978-0-333-53810-4.
