= Maidenhead Heritage Centre =

Museum in Berkshire, England

Coordinates: 51.5218°N 0.7195°W

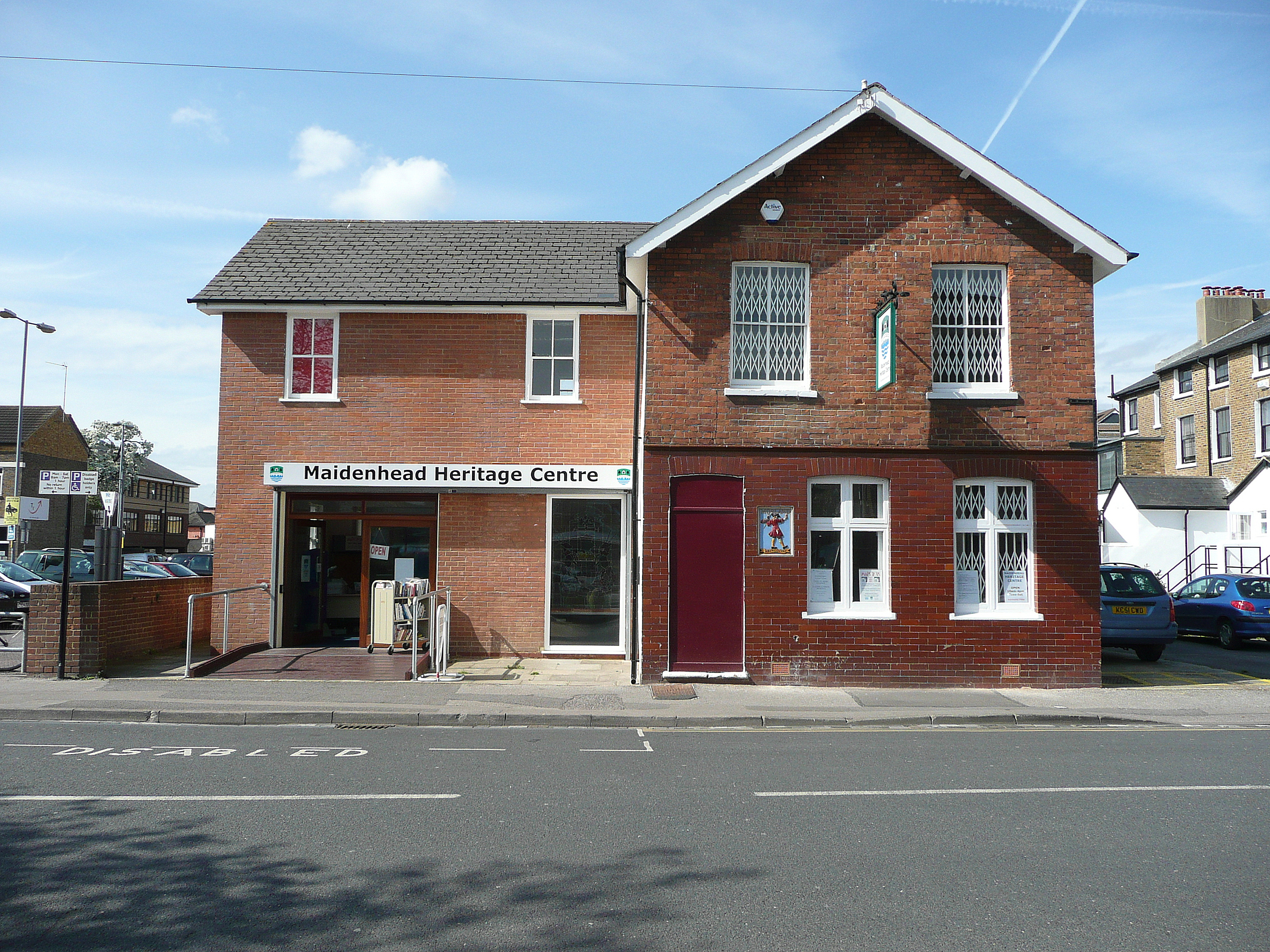
Maidenhead Heritage Centre

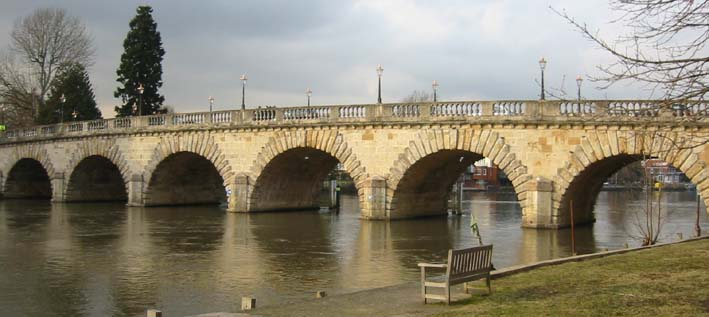
Maidenhead Bridge, the subject of a special exhibition at Maidenhead Heritage Centre in 2007

Maidenhead Heritage Centre is a heritage centre and museum in the town of Maidenhead, Berkshire, England.

Maidenhead Heritage Centre and Museum was founded in 1993. The centre presents the history of Maidenhead history from Roman times to the present. It collects and preserves artefacts, photographs, documents, and sound recordings, to illustrate local history. The Maidenhead Archaeological & Historical Society, founded in 1960–1, collaborates with the centre.

In December 2006, the centre and museum moved to a permanent location in Park Street. Special exhibitions are organised and presented, for example one on Maidenhead Bridge, the main historic road bridge to the east of the town, in 2007, marking its 230th anniversary. There is a permanent exhibition of material related to the Air Transport Auxiliary, which was based at White Waltham Airfield.

The museum was accredited by the Museums, Libraries and Archives Council in 2009.
