= Churchmead School =

Voluntary aided school in Berkshire, England

Location
- Priory Way; Datchet, Slough, SL3 9JQ; England; 51.486086°N 0.579000°W

Information
- Type: Voluntary aided school
- Motto: Believe to Achieve
- Religious affiliation: Church of England
- Established: 1950
- Local authority: Royal Borough of Windsor and Maidenhead
- Department for Education URN: 133580 Tables
- Ofsted: Reports
- Head teacher: Chris Tomes
- Gender: Co-educational
- Age: 11 to 18
- Enrolment: 1034
- Houses: Victor, Faith, Becket and Theresa
- Colours: Yellow, red, and green
- Website: https://www.churchmead.org/

Churchmead School is a co-educational Church of England voluntary aided secondary school that caters for 11- to 18-year-olds. It is located in Datchet, near Slough, England. The school's motto is "Believe to Achieve". The school has gained Specialist Arts College status.

Churchmead was established as a secondary modern school for Buckinghamshire County Council, who, in the south of the county, operated a system of 11- to 18-year-old secondary schools, fed by 5–11 primary schools (or 5–7 infant schools and 7–11 junior schools). Changes to administrative county boundaries in 1974 led to the school transferring to Berkshire County Council, who operated it as a school within Slough's education system, by then modified for the change from primary to secondary education to take place at age 12 rather than 11. Further changes led to the Royal Borough of Windsor and Maidenhead becoming the Education Authority in 1998. The rest of the Windsor area of Windsor and Maidenhead uses a system with age 9–13 middle schools, leaving Churchmead as the only 11–18 school in its area of the borough. This in turn results in most students being drawn from Slough, which has resumed secondary education starting at age 11.

Starting in September 2008, the four-house system that had been in existence since the school was founded, was scrapped for a three-house inter-year form system.

== Prefects ==
The school maintains a prefect system, including a head boy, head girl, four deputy head boys, and four deputy head girls.

== School links ==
Churchmead School is in co-operation with East Berkshire College. Sixth form students from both schools can study advanced level courses including media and photography at Churchmead.
