= Strode's College =

Coordinates: 51.433°N 0.550°W

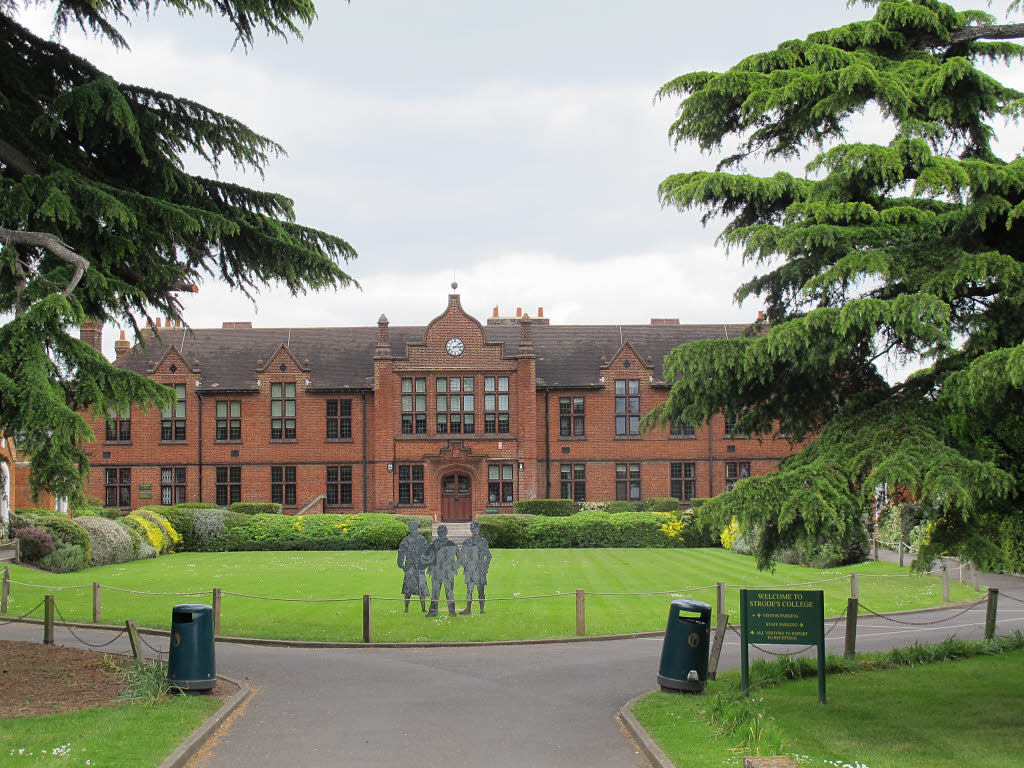

Location
- High Street; Egham, Surrey, TW20 9DR; England

Information
- Type: Sixth form college
- Motto: Latin: Malo Mori Quam Fœdari (I would rather die than be dishonoured)
- Established: 1704 (1975 as a college)
- Local authority: Surrey County Council
- Principal: Amanda Down
- Gender: Mixed
- Age range: 16+
- Enrolment: 1350
- Affiliation: Windsor Forest Colleges Group
- Website: https://www.strodes.ac.uk/

Strode's College is a sixth form college located in Egham, Surrey. It was founded in 1704, when Henry Strode bequeathed £6,000 to set up a free school in his native parish of Egham. In the twentieth century, Strode's became a boys' grammar school, before being designated a sixth form college in 1975. The college also provides a range of day and evening Adult Education courses. Strode's has been part of the Windsor Forest Colleges Group since May 2017. Alumni of the college are sometimes referred to as Old Strodians.

== History ==
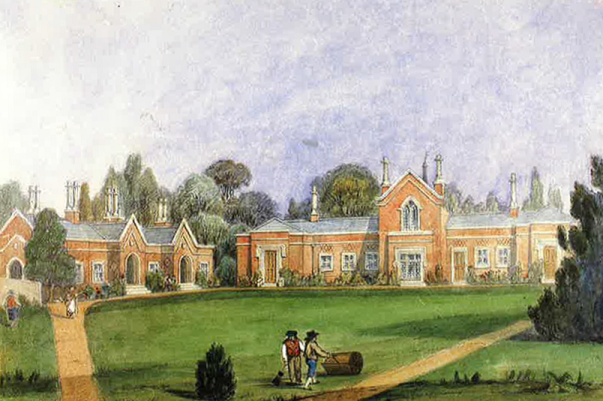
Painting of the former main building demolished in 1915 and one of the extant almshouses.

The college traces its origins to the free school founded by Henry Strode. This school and the Almshouses were built on the same site in Egham in 1706. The original buildings were pulled down. Of their replacements, built in 1828, two ranges of almshouses remain. Listed as historic buildings, they are still in use by the college. The present main college building dates from 1915. The school has been known previously as Strode's School and as Strode's Grammar School from 1919 until 1975, when it became Strode's College.

In September 2016 it was announced that Strode's would merge with East Berkshire College. The merger was completed on 9 May 2017 when the colleges combined to form the Windsor Forest Colleges Group.

== The Worshipful Company of Coopers ==
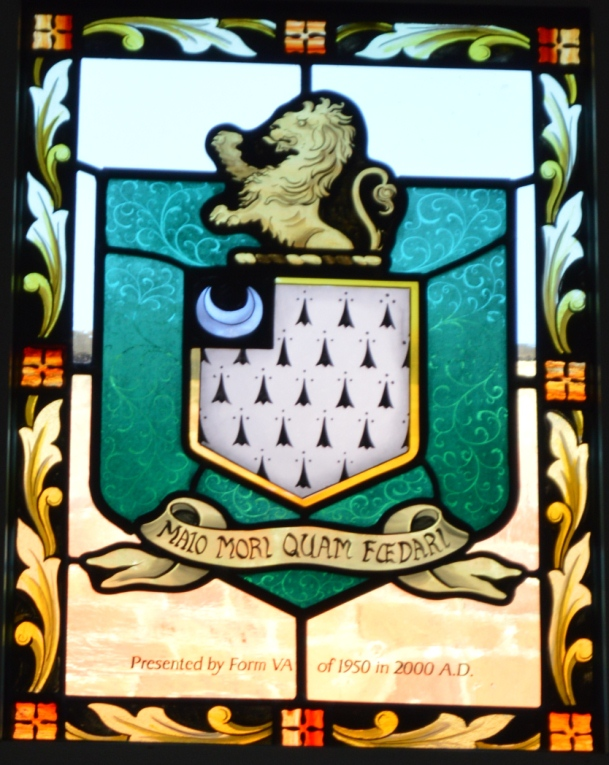
Stained glass window depicting the college's coat of arms.

From the time of its foundation the Coopers' Company was the Trustee of Henry Strode's Charity, which administered the school but in 1912 the Charity Commissioners drafted a new scheme which gave the school its own board of governors, changed it from an elementary to a secondary school and brought it into the Surrey education system. Under further changes introduced following the Education Act 1944, the school was granted Voluntary Controlled status as a boys' grammar school and the composition of its governing body set to include four Foundation Trustees, one of whom, at least, was to be a representative of the company.

The company continues to provide funds administered by the Foundation Trustees for the benefit of the college.

== Notable former students ==
- Susie Amy, actress
- Paul Casey, professional golfer
- Kirsty Capes, author
- Colin Cramphorn, policeman
- Sir Roy Gardner, businessman
- Adrian Genziani, Olympic rower
- Gavin Greenaway, composer and conductor
- Hard-Fi band members
- Steve Lillywhite, record producer (U2 etc.)
- Doon Mackichan, actor and comedian
- Aubrey Manning, zoologist and broadcaster
- Dennis Pacey, footballer
- Elyes Gabel, actor
- Mark Stephens, lawyer and broadcaster
