= Windsor Forest Colleges Group =

Further education colleges in Berkshire, England

Coordinates: 51.5052°N 0.5451°W

Windsor Forest Colleges Group (formerly East Berkshire College)
- St Leonard's Road, Windsor, Station Road, Langley, High Street, Egham and Burchetts Green, Maidenhead; England

Information
- Former name: East Berkshire College
- Type: Further education college
- Religious affiliation: None
- Established: 9 May 2017 (East Berkshire College established May 1992)
- Department for Education URN: 130604 Tables
- Ofsted: Reports
- CEO and Group Principal: Oliver Symons
- Gender: Mixed
- Age range: 16+
- Color: Purple
- Website: https://www.windsor-forest.ac.uk

Windsor Forest Colleges Group is a group of further education colleges located in Berkshire and Surrey, England. It was formerly known as East Berkshire College. It consists of Strode's College, Windsor College, Langley College, and the Berkshire College of Agriculture (BCA).

== History ==
East Berkshire College was established in May 1992 through the merger of Langley and Windsor and Maidenhead Colleges. In November 1995 it had 12,283 enrolled students - of whom 2,917 attended full time - making it one of the largest further education colleges in England. In 2007-08, East Berkshire College had 11,078 students enrolled, most part-time.

In September 2016, a merger with Strode's College was announced, which was due to be completed in February 2017. East Berkshire College formally merged with Strode's College on 9 May 2017 to form the Windsor Forest Colleges Group.

Berkshire College of Agriculture (BCA) joined the Windsor Forest group in August 2022.

== Ofsted ratings ==
Full Ofsted inspections:

- May 2009 - Rated "good"
- February 2013 - Rated "good"
- November 2016 - Rated "requires improvement"
- November 2019 - Rated "good"
