= Berkshire College of Agriculture =

Agricultural college in Maidenhead, United Kingdom

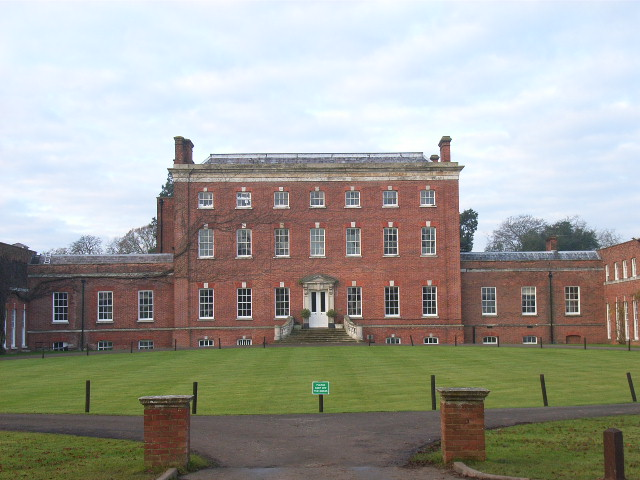
- Hall Place, Berkshire College of Agriculture
- Type: Further education
- Established: 1949
- Affiliations: Windsor Forest Colleges Group
- Interim Principal: Anne Entwistle
- Location: Burchetts Green; Berkshire; England; 51.530°N 0.800°W
- Website: http://www.bca.ac.uk/

Berkshire College of Agriculture is a further education agricultural college at Hall Place in Burchetts Green, Maidenhead, Berkshire. It was founded in 1949, as the Berkshire Institute of Agriculture. It has been part of the Windsor Forest Colleges Group since August 2022.

== Courses ==
The college was built to provide a training centre for agricultural workers. It has expanded to offer work with animals and construction. The college is located on 450 acres (180 ha) of farm land, with residential accommodation for over 70 students.

== Principals ==
2012: Steve Wain

2013: Gillian May

2021:Anne Entwistle

== Catchment area ==
As this is a further education college, there is no legal catchment area, but its rural location causes an extensive bus service to be run to many towns and villages including Amersham, Beaconsfield, Bushey, Bracknell, Camberley, The Chalfonts, Gerrards Cross, Great Missenden, Henley, High Wycombe, Maidenhead, Reading, Rickmansworth, Slough, Thame, Uxbridge, Wallingford, Windsor, Watford and Wokingham.

== See also ==
- List of UCAS institutions
- List of universities in the United Kingdom
