= Victoria Bridge, Datchet =

Victoria Bridge
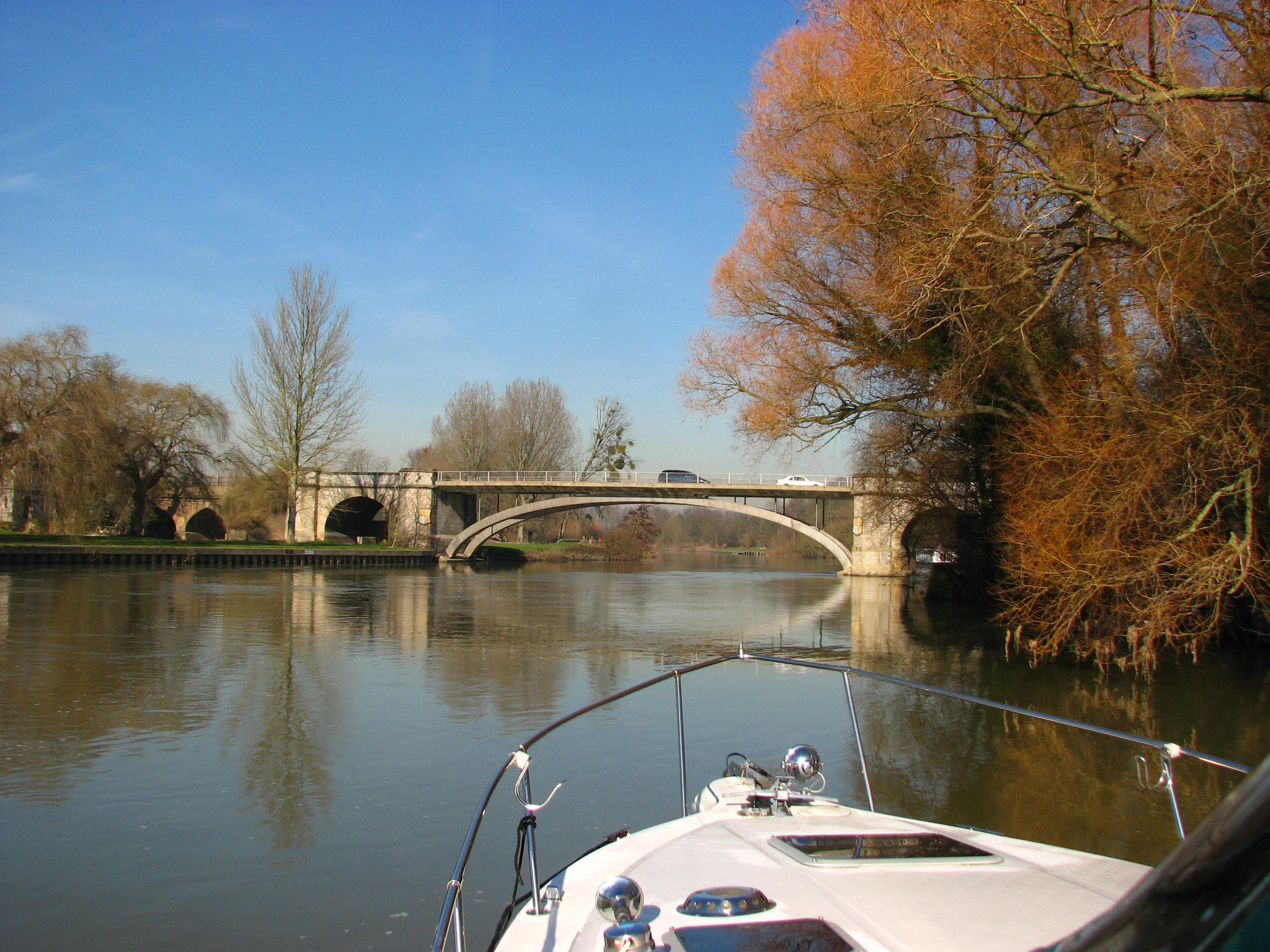
- Victoria Bridge from the downstream side
- Coordinates: 51°29′16″N 0°35′29″W
- Carries: Thames Path
- Crosses: River Thames
- Locale: Windsor, Berkshire
- Official name: Victoria Bridge
- Maintained by: Royal Borough of Windsor and Maidenhead

Characteristics
- Design: Arch
- Height: 20 feet 3 inches (6.17 m)

History
- Opened: 1967

Victoria Bridge is a road bridge running north–south between Datchet and Windsor, Berkshire, England. It crosses the River Thames on the reach between Old Windsor Lock and Romney Lock. It was rebuilt in 1967 to replace a damaged bridge.

The Victoria and Albert Bridges in Datchet were built to replace the old Datchet Bridge as part of the re-routing of the Datchet to Windsor roads following the expansion of the grounds of Windsor Castle. Prince Albert is said to have had a part in the design Victoria Bridge was built in 1851, paid for partly by the Windsor, Staines and Richmond Railway Company who were keen to have access to Windsor across part of the castle property. The original bridge was built of cast iron with stone abutments. The bridge was severely damaged by a group of tanks crossing it during World War II but was not closed until 1963, operating with weight restrictions. There was a temporary Bailey bridge until 1966, then the central crossing was replaced by a concrete structure and reopened in 1967. Under the terms of the original contract, British Rail were required to contribute to the cost. The Thames Path crosses the bridge rejoining the original towpath on the Windsor side for the northern part of Home Park, the towpath access in Home Park, Windsor having been lost due to the Windsor Castle Act 1848.

== See also ==
- Crossings of the River Thames

Next bridge upstream	River Thames	Next bridge downstream
Black Potts Railway Bridge	Victoria Bridge	Albert Bridge
Next bridge upstream	Thames Path	Next bridge downstream
Windsor Bridge southern bank	Victoria Bridge	Albert Bridge northern bank
