= Burchetts Green =

Coordinates: 51°31′24″N 0°47′23″W

- Village
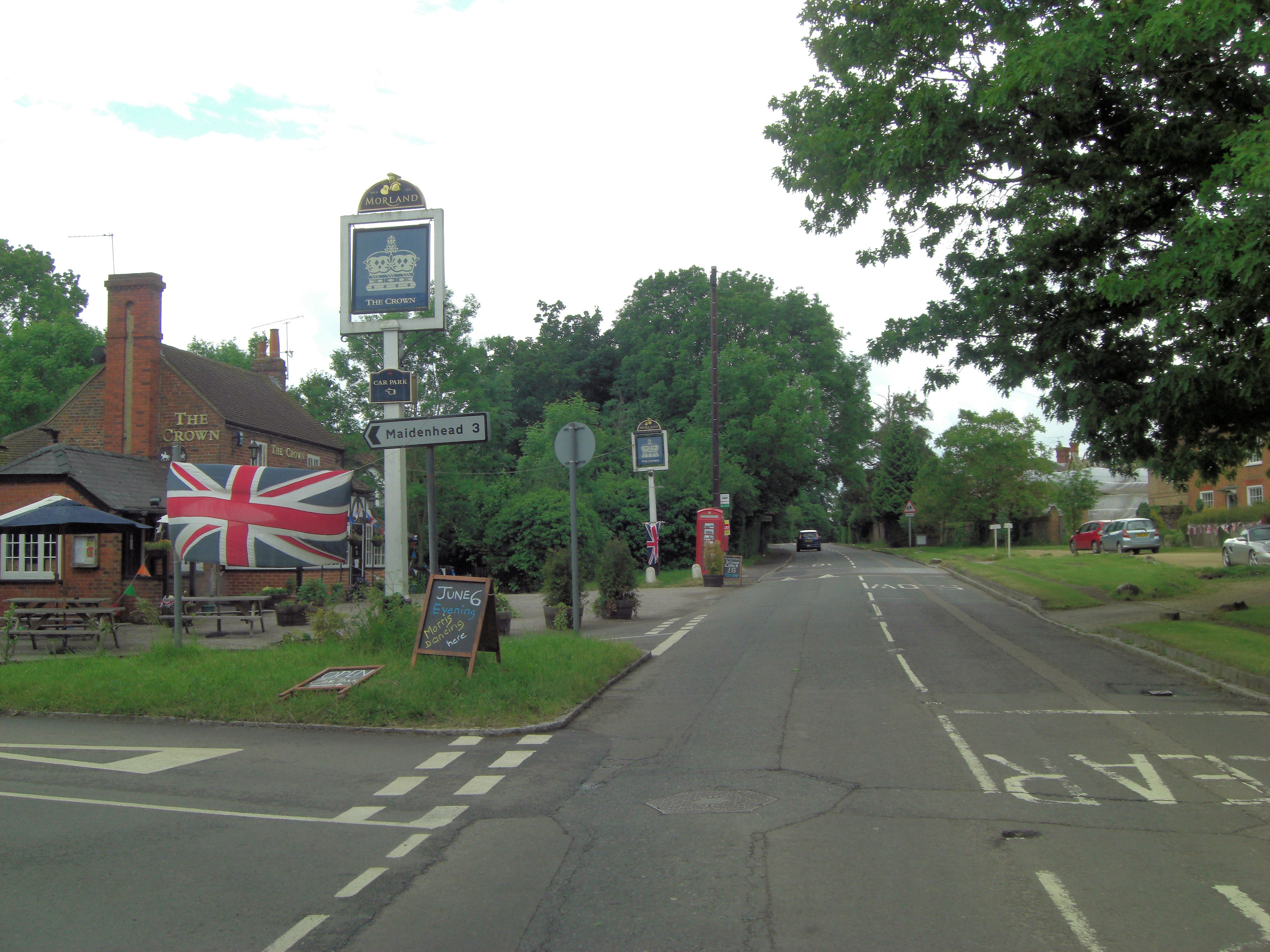
- The Crown pub in Burchetts Green

- Location within Berkshire
- OS grid reference: SU839812
- Unitary authority: Windsor and Maidenhead
- Ceremonial county: Berkshire
- Region: South East
- Country: England
- Sovereign state: United Kingdom
- Post town: Maidenhead
- Postcode district: SL6
- Dialling code: 01628
- Police: Thames Valley
- Fire: Royal Berkshire
- Ambulance: South Central
- UK Parliament: Maidenhead

Burchetts Green is a small village to the west of Maidenhead in the English county of Berkshire. It is half in the civil parish of Hurley and half in the civil parish of Bisham. The Berkshire College of Agriculture is located there and includes Hall Place, which was built in 1728 by William East, a wealthy London lawyer. Burchetts Green School was originally built as a chapel in 1868 on land donated by the Clayton-East family. It is an infant school with around 50 pupils. There are three churches in the parish, as well as a Michelin starred pub, The Crown, which in 2017 was voted 10th in Estrella Damm's top 50 gastro pubs in the United Kingdom.
