= Albert Bridge, Datchet =

Albert Bridge
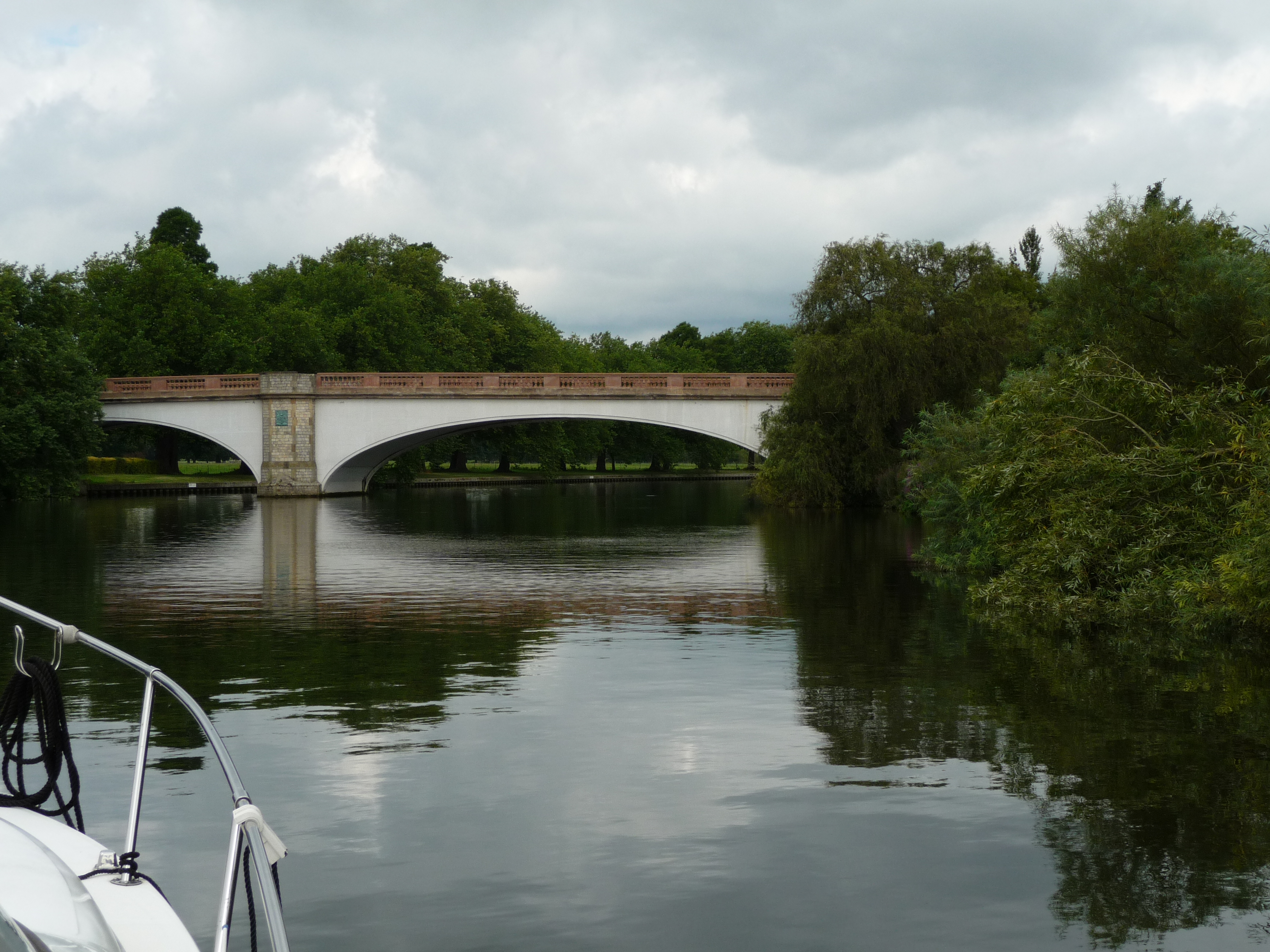
- Downstream side of Albert Bridge in the colours of its 2004 repainting
- Coordinates: 51°28′16″N 0°35′03″W
- Carries: B3021 Southlea Road, Thames Path
- Crosses: River Thames
- Locale: Windsor
- Maintained by: Royal Borough of Windsor and Maidenhead

Characteristics
- Design: Arch
- Material: Brick
- Height: 18 feet 8 inches (5.69 m)

History
- Opened: 1927

Albert Bridge is a road bridge in England running north–south and carrying the B3021 between Datchet and Old Windsor. It crosses the River Thames on the reach between Old Windsor Lock and Romney Lock. It was rebuilt in brick in 1927 to replace a cast-iron bridge built in 1850–51.

The Albert and Victoria Bridges in Datchet were built to replace the old Datchet Bridge as part of the rerouting of the Datchet to Windsor roads following the expansion of the grounds of Windsor Castle. Prince Albert is said to have had a part in the design The original bridge was built of cast iron and opened in 1851. In 1914 a large hole appeared in the bridge, but it was not until 1927 that the various authorities had agreed on its replacement and built it. The Thames Path crosses the bridge rejoining the original towpath on the Windsor side south of Home Park, the towpath access in Home Park, Windsor having been lost due to the Windsor Castle Act 1848.

== Datchet Bridge ==
The first bridge at Datchet was a wooden structure built in 1706 funded by Queen Anne. This was replaced in 1770 by a ten-arch bridge of wood on stone piers but this collapsed in a flood in 1794, a ferry being reinstated in its place, until a third bridge was built on the remaining piers in 1812. When this structure collapsed in 1834 Berkshire and Buckinghamshire councils could not agree on the replacement with the result that whereas the former rebuilt their half in iron, the northern half was built by the latter in wood. This structure was removed in 1848 because the land on the Windsor side of the river became part of the private grounds of Windsor Castle. It was replaced by the Victoria and Albert Bridges.

== See also ==
- Albert Bridge, London
- Crossings of the River Thames

Next bridge upstream	River Thames	Next bridge downstream
Victoria Bridge	Albert Bridge	Runnymede Bridge
Next bridge upstream	Thames Path	Next bridge downstream
Victoria Bridge northern bank	Albert Bridge	Staines Bridge southern bank
