= Datchet =

Village and civil parish in Berkshire, England

Coordinates: 51°29′03″N 0°34′34″W

- Village and civil parish
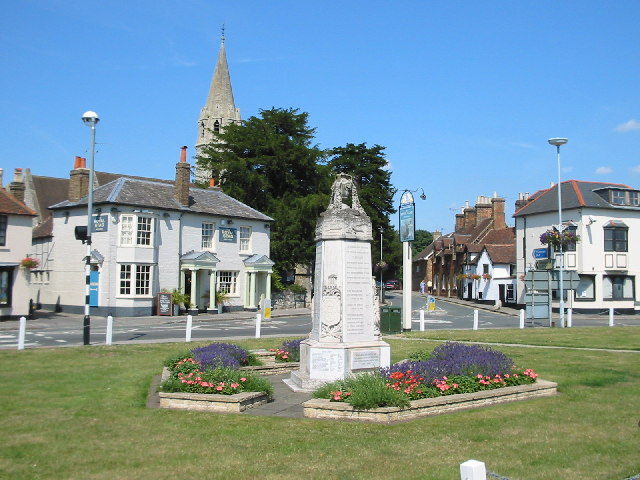
- Datchet village centre

- Location within Berkshire
- Population: 4,913 (2011 Census)
- OS grid reference: SU988771
- Civil parish: Datchet
- Unitary authority: Windsor and Maidenhead
- Ceremonial county: Berkshire
- Region: South East
- Country: England
- Sovereign state: United Kingdom
- Post town: SLOUGH
- Postcode district: SL3
- Dialling code: 01753
- Police: Thames Valley
- Fire: Royal Berkshire
- Ambulance: South Central
- UK Parliament: Windsor

Datchet is a village and civil parish in the Royal Borough of Windsor and Maidenhead in Berkshire, England, on the north bank of the River Thames. Historically part of Buckinghamshire, and the Stoke Hundred, the village was eventually transferred to Berkshire, under the Local Government Act 1972. The village developed because of its proximity to Windsor and the ferry service which connected it to the main London Road across the River Thames. The ferry was later replaced by a road bridge at the foot of High Street. The bridge was rebuilt three times. There is also a rail bridge approaching Windsor across the river, and road bridges above and below the village.

== Etymology ==
The name Datchet is first attested, in a charter from between 990 and 992, as Deccet; it appears in the Domesday Book as Daceta. The name is thought to be Celtic in origin, partly because of its similarity to the ancient Gaulish name Decetia; the last part may be the Brittonic word that appears in modern Welsh as coed ("wood").

== History ==
There is evidence of habitation in the area shortly after the end of the last ice age, between 10,000 and 6,500 years ago, and of a multi-period settlement at Southlea from the Neolithic to the late Roman periods. An excavation at Riding Court, a manorial sub-division of Datchet, has revealed a monument complex that included a cursus, ring ditches, oval barrows and causewayed enclosures. The monuments had developed alongside the River Thames, which acted as a barrier, a gateway and a routeway to other regions. The 2017 investigations at Riding Court Farm have provided evidence of Early Neolithic activity (4000–3350 BC) with the discovery of a previously unknown causewayed enclosure.

Datchet is first mentioned between 990 and 994, when Æthelred made small grants of land here. In the Domesday Book, in 1066 the lords were the brothers Saewulf and Siward. In 1086 the lord and tenant-in-chief was Giles, brother of Ansculf, also referred to as Giles de Pinkney. In 1150, the church already existed in Datchet, and the Pinkney family sold it to the abbey of St Albans. The Abbot became rector as impropriator of the parish and had the right to appoint vicars. There was a ferry at Datchet Ferry which provided a shorter route from London to Windsor Castle and was frequently used by royalty.

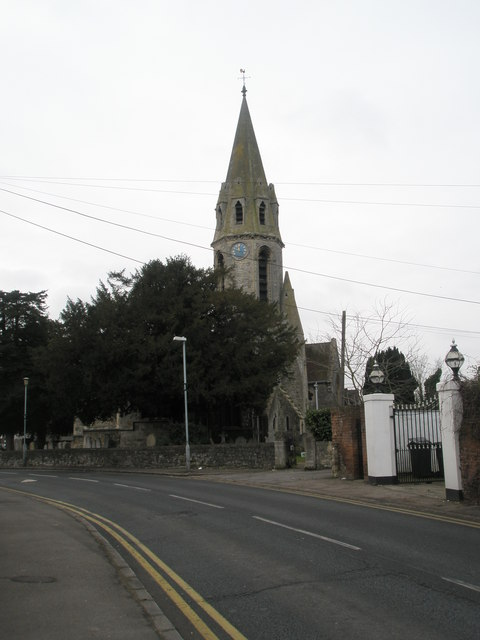
St Mary's Church with its octagonal tower

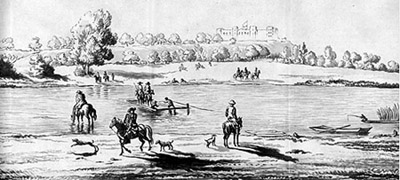
Datchet Mead and Datchet Ferry in 1686 with Windsor Castle in the background

Datchet from J5 of the M4 and the Queen Mother Reservoir to Datchet Golf Course

In 1249, Henry III gave a great oak from Windsor Forest to make a barge for passage from Windsor to Datchet. In 1350, Edward III gave Datchet Church as part of the endowment of his new church and college of St George at Windsor Castle. St. Mary's church originated as a rectory in the 13th century. A church, dated from 1559 by the parish registers, was dismantled in 1857, rebuilt, and reopened in 1860. It is notable in that its tower is octagonal, the greater number of church towers being square or round. On the dissolution of the monasteries, the Crown confiscated the rectory, which was sold by Parliament in 1659 to William Stanbridge and Thomas Roberts.

The history of the manor begins in 1335 when Edward III gave the manor of Datchet to William de Montacute, who then passed it on to Sir John Molyns, who held it until 1631, when it passed to the Winwood family and eventually to the Buccleuch and Montagu families. Lord Montagu of Beaulieu is still the titular Lord of Datchet Manor but owns no property here.

=== 17th century onwards ===
In 1641, Charles I sold the manor house and estate of Riding Court to William Wheeler. It was later sold out of the Wheeler estates, and, after passing through various hands, was finally conveyed to John Montagu, 2nd Duke of Montagu in 1742, and so came once more under the same ownership as Datchet Manor. After the death in 1790 of his son-in-law, George, Earl of Cardigan, created Duke of Montagu in 1766, the manors passed to the latter's daughter Elizabeth wife of Henry Scott, 3rd Duke of Buccleuch. From 1802 the title followed the same descent as Datchet and Ditton in Stoke Poges, and the manorial rights were vested in John Walter Edward, the second Lord Montagu of Beaulieu, until recently transferred to David Mapley, the current owner.

In 1706, the ferry that carried traffic across the River Thames through Datchet was replaced by Datchet Bridge. The crossing was replaced three times until it was finally demolished in 1851 as part of the re-routing of roads and bridges when the LSWR railway line was built from Richmond to Windsor. Traffic between Old Windsor and Datchet now uses a southerly route along Southlea Road and crossing Albert Bridge, while a new Windsor Road was built from Datchet riverside and crossing the new Victoria Bridge. In 1742, John Montagu, 2nd Duke of Montagu bought Datchet manor, and his family owned it until at least 1925; at one point it was owned by the head of the influential Montagu-Douglas-Scott family, Henry Scott, 3rd Duke of Buccleuch.

In 1790, a workhouse was built in Holmlea Road and in 1820 an almshouse belonging to the workhouse was turned into a shop. In 1848, the first train went through Datchet to Windsor and by 1860 Datchet Common's beer house, The Plough, was in existence. In 1886, Datchet was described as having been known as Black Datchet in the early 1800s because of a large number of bad characters living there, and that Aylesbury County Jail had one building known as the 'Datchet Wing' filled mostly with poachers, for which there is good evidence.

In early 1911 a young Sydney Camm watched Sir Thomas Sopwith land his aircraft on Datchet golf course, on his return journey from Windsor Castle.

== In popular culture ==
In Jerome K. Jerome's Three Men in a Boat, the narrator describes a previous visit to Datchet, during which he and his friends experience extreme difficulties in getting lodgings for the night. This has descriptions of the Manor Hotel and the Royal Stag.

== Commerce and services ==
Datchet railway station is on the Windsor & Eton Riverside to London Waterloo line with a journey time of around 55 minutes. The Manor is a hotel and conference centre, originally part of the Manor House range of houses, owned but never occupied by any lord of the manor. There is one pub in Datchet, The Royal Stag. The former Morning Star is now a Costa Coffee shop and the Plough is a branch of Tesco. Datchet has three schools; Churchmead School, a secondary school, Datchet St. Mary's Primary School, and Eton End, a private preparatory school.

== Sport and social clubs ==
Datchet has a number of sports clubs, including Datchet Cricket Club, Datchet Football Club (Senior & Junior Football), a golf club founded in 1892, and a sailing club at the Queen Mother Reservoir. Datchet Players are an amateur dramatics society that have been putting on productions in the village hall since the 1960s.

== Notable residents ==
- William Herschel, astronomer, lived at The Lawn on Horton Road from 1782 to 1785.
- Hon Evelyn Ellis lived at Rosenau on Southlea Road in the 1880s. He owned the first motor car in Britain.
- Louis Levy, film music director and composer, was living at Orchard Cottage, Horton Road in Datchet at the time of his death in 1957.
- Barry Davies, sports commentator, lives in Datchet.
- Stephen Tompkinson, actor, has lived in Datchet since 2003.
- Percy de Paravicini, England footballer and cricketer, lived at Riverside House, Windsor Road in Datchet.
