= Boveney Lock =

Lock on the River Thames in Buckinghamshire, England

Coordinates: 51.49038°N 0.64171°W

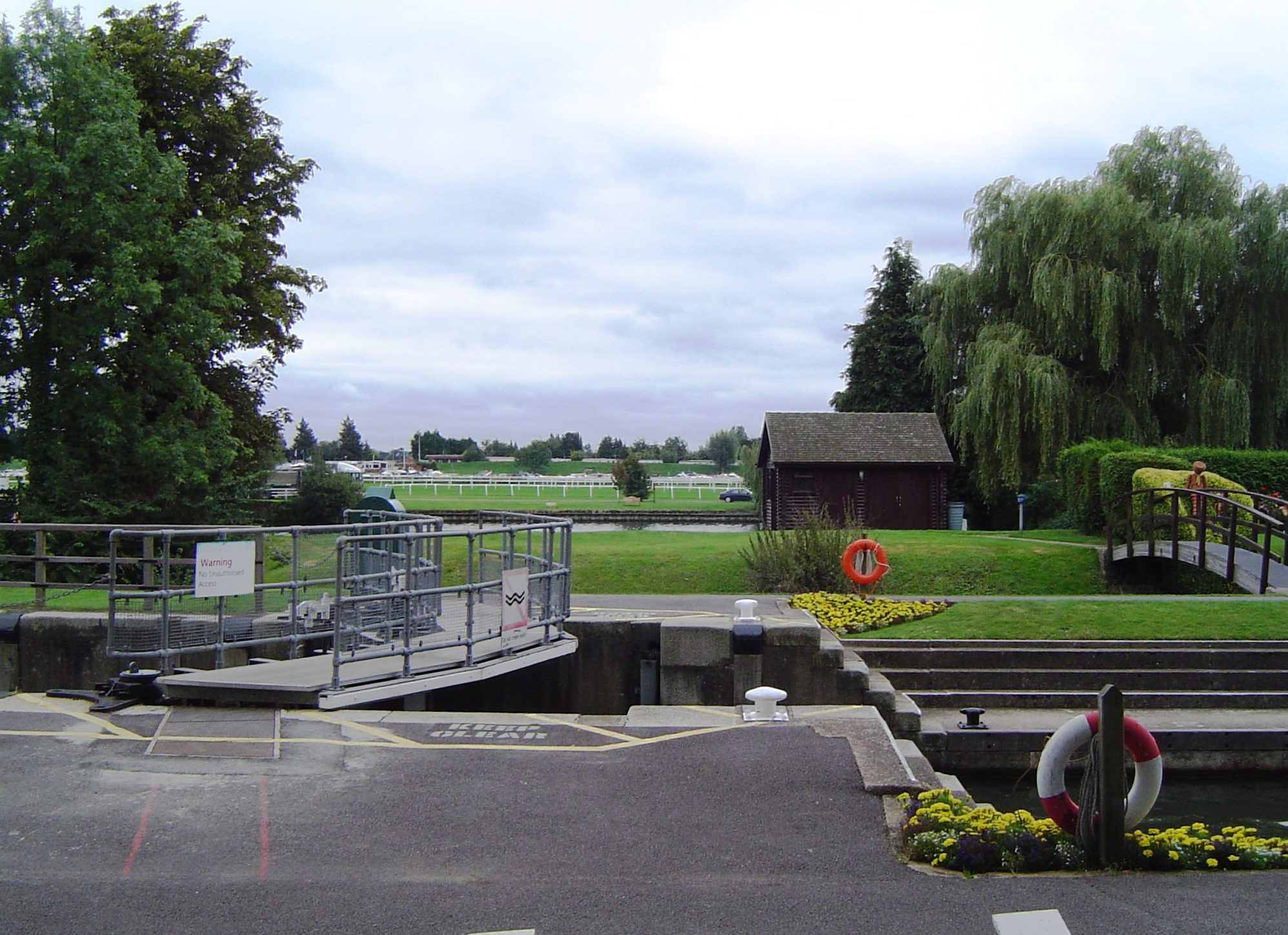
- Boveney Lock, with a bridge across the Portage to private mooring. Windsor Racecourse can be seen on the far bank
- Waterway: River Thames
- County: Buckinghamshire
- Maintained by: Environment Agency
- Operation: Hydraulic
- First built: 1838
- Latest built: 1898
- Length: 45.59 m (149 ft 7 in)
- Width: 5.43 m (17 ft 10 in)
- Fall: 1.47 m (4 ft 10 in)
- Above sea level: 64 feet (20 m)
- Distance to Teddington Lock: 26 miles (42 km)
- Power is available out of hours.

Boveney Lock is a lock on the River Thames situated on the Buckinghamshire bank opposite the Windsor Racecourse and close to Eton Wick. Boveney is a village a little way upstream on the same side. The lock was first built in 1838 by the Thames Navigation Commission. The lock was rebuilt in 1898 closer to the Buckinghamshire bank, and a set of boat rollers were installed on the old site.

The weir is almost parallel to the lock, running across from the other side of the lock island.

== History ==
Although the river below Maidenhead was supposed to be clear of weirs, there is record of a weir and flash lock at Gill's bucks a short way upstream of the present site. There were suggestions of a pound lock here as early as 1780, and various plans for a lock were proposed in 1820. These plans proposed cuts to the mouth of Clewer Mill Stream because of difficult navigation of the tight bends downstream. However, the present location was eventually chosen, with a timber lock built in 1838. With the regular traffic of boats from Eton College to Queen's Eyot, a temporary boat slide was built in 1895, which became permanent on the site of the old lock when a new lock was built immediately to the side in 1898. The weir was rebuilt in about 1913.

== Access to the lock ==
The lock is some distance from any road, and can be reached by walking to the river from Eton Wick and following the towpath.

== Reach above the lock ==
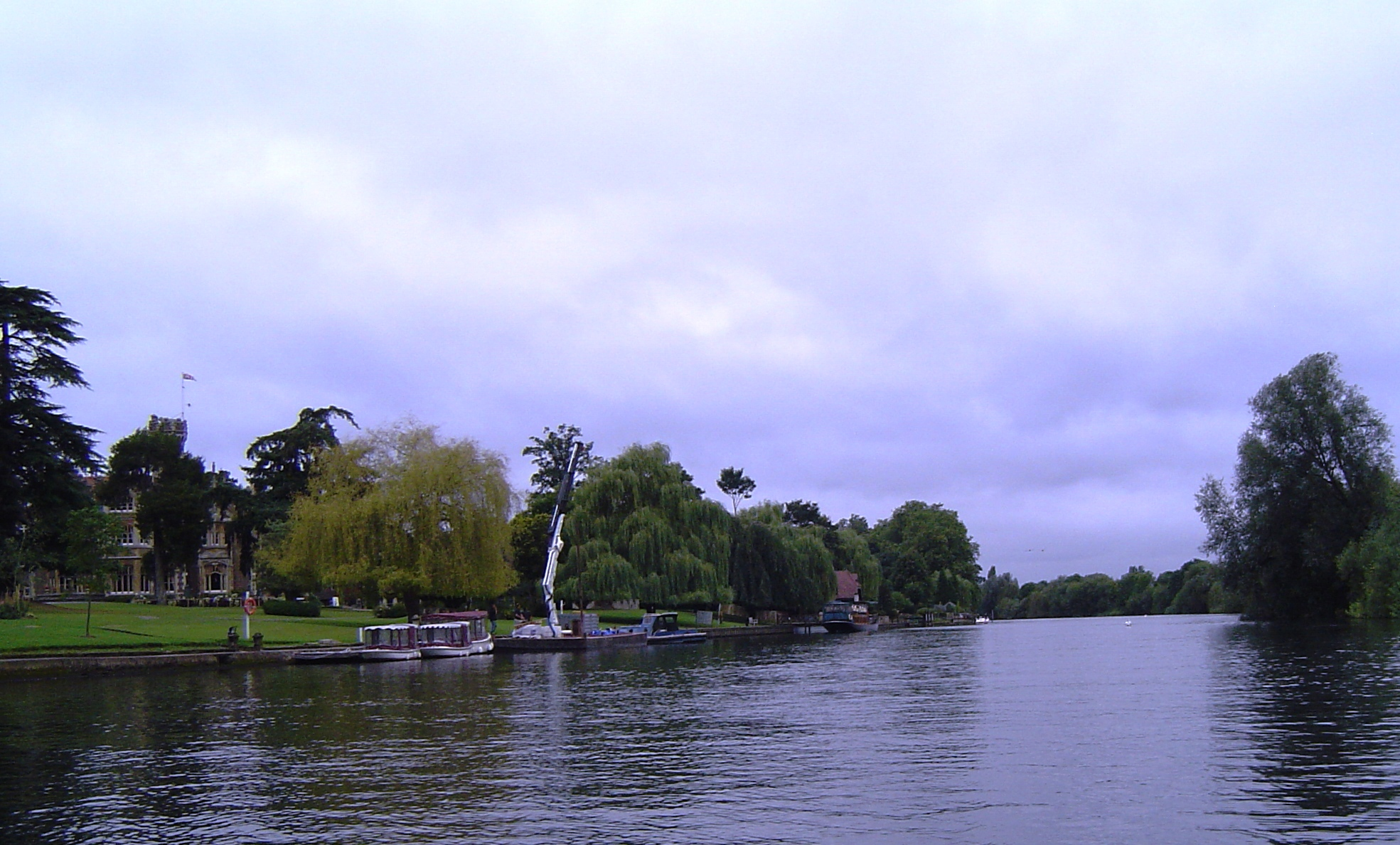
Above Boveney Lock, with Oakley Court on the left

On the Buckinghamshire bank the land towards Dorney is open fields with Dorney Lake behind. On the Berkshire bank the river passes Bush Ait which is at the entrance to Clewer Mill Stream. There are houses at Dedworth, a caravan park and Windsor Marina before Oakley Court, home of many Hammer horror films. Upstream is Queens Eyot, owned by Eton College, opposite Bray Marina. York Stream then joins the river from "The Cut" on the southern bank. Summerleaze Footbridge here was built as a gravel conveyor for the building of Dorney Lake and is now a pedestrian bridge. Monkey Island is a short way upstream and then the M4 Bridge crosses the river a little way below Bray Lock.

=== Sports clubs ===
- Eton Excelsior Rowing Club

=== Thames Path ===
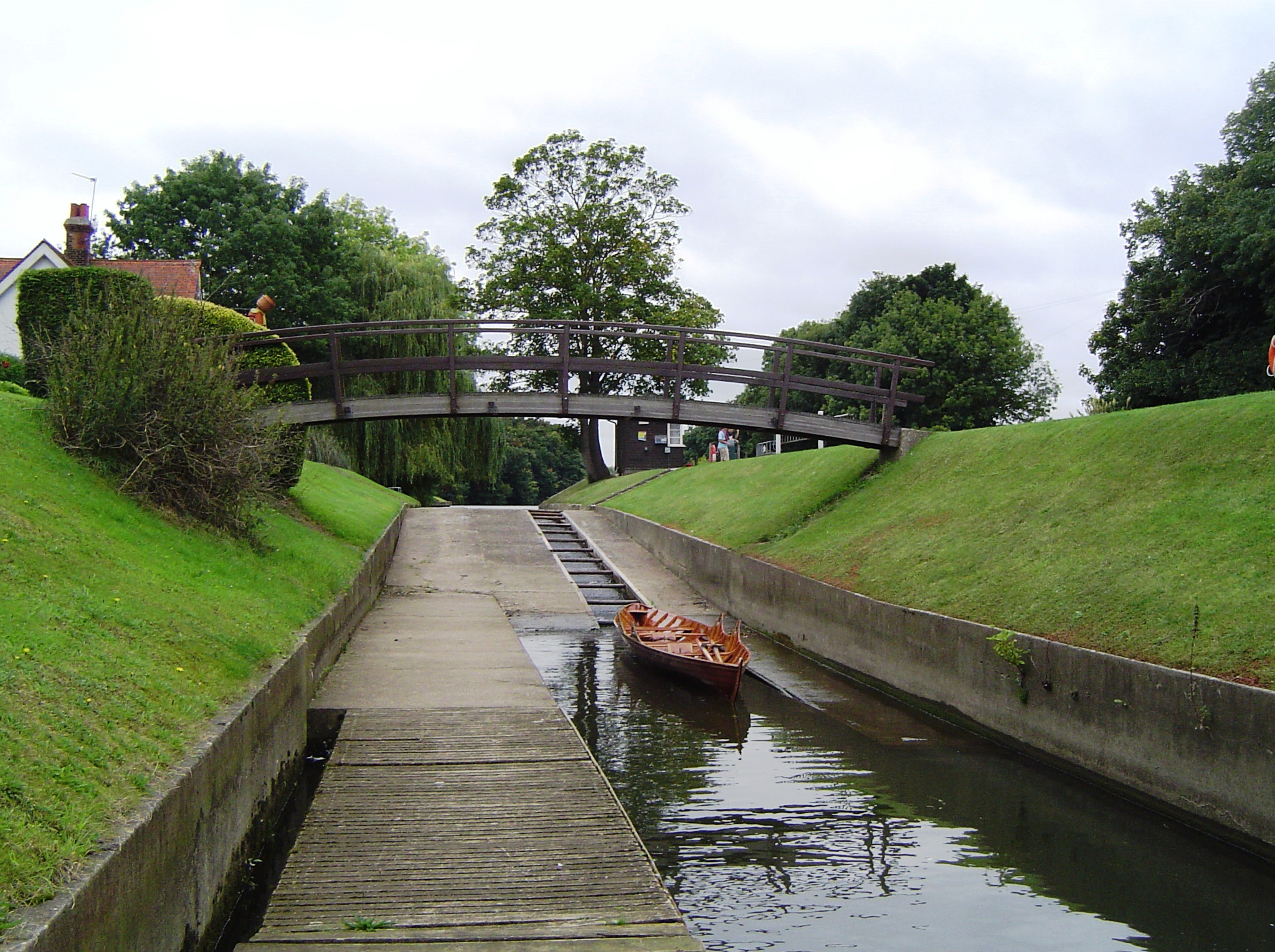
Boat slide at Boveney Lock

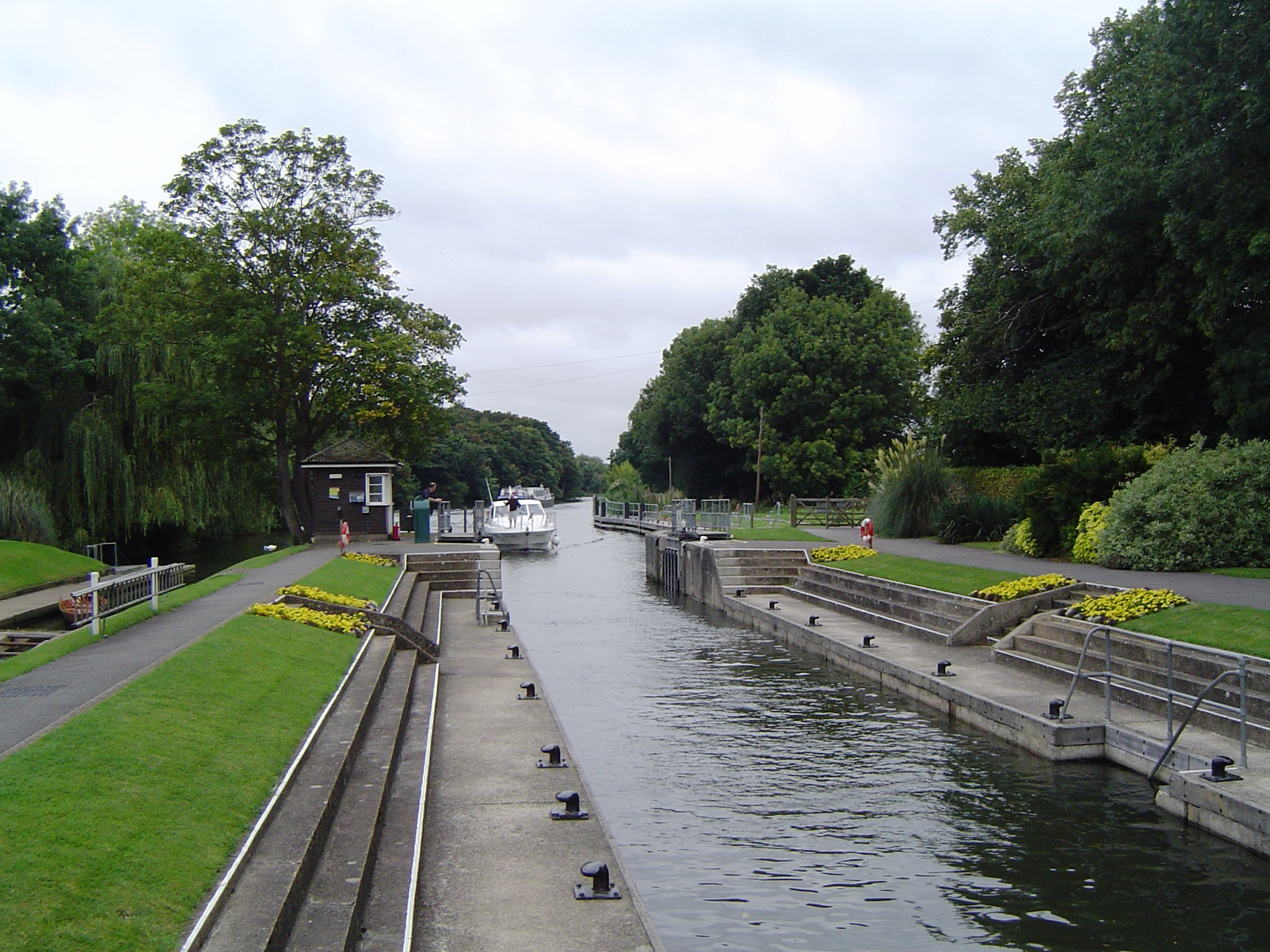
Boveney Lock looking upstream

The Thames Path stays on the northern side of the river to Bray lock.

== See also ==
- Locks on the River Thames
- Rowing on the River Thames

Next lock upstream	River Thames	Next lock downstream
Bray Lock; 5.10 km (3.17 mi)	Boveney Lock; Grid reference: SU944777	Romney Lock; 3.75 km (2.33 mi)
