= The Cut, Berkshire =

River in Berkshire, England

The Cut
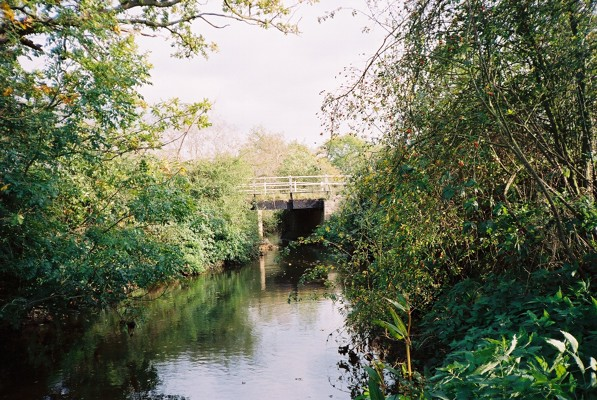
- Cokeley Bridge, crossing The Cut

Location
- Country: England
- Counties: Berkshire
- Towns: Bray, Berkshire, Binfield, Warfield, Winkfield

Physical characteristics
- Source
  - location: North Ascot, Bracknell Forest, Berkshire
  - coordinates: 51°25′50″N 0°40′53″W
- Mouth: River Thames
  - location: Bray, Berkshire
  - coordinates: 51°29′57″N 0°40′53″W
- Length: 23 km (14 mi)

The Cut is a river in England that rises in North Ascot, Berkshire. It flows for around 14 miles (23 km), through the rural Northern Parishes of Winkfield, Warfield and Binfield in Bracknell Forest on its way down to Bray, where it meets the River Thames just above Queens Eyot on the reach below Bray Lock, having been joined by the Maidenhead Waterways.

The Cut is so named because it was diverted eastwards artificially in the early nineteenth century from its original course westwards to the River Loddon via Stanlake Park south of Twyford to alleviate flood risk. At some point, it was known as How Brook, although in 1813 it was known as the Broadwater.

== Route ==
The Cut flows along the northern edge of the new town of Bracknell, which was established on 17 June 1949. Prior to this, Bracknell had been a small village near Bracknell railway station, and the area which it now occupies was largely rural. The river had three tributaries, Downmill Stream, which ran along the western edge of the designated area, Bull Brook which ran through the centre, and Blackmoor Stream, which ran along the eastern edge. Rather than embrace these waterways, parts of them were culverted and the new town built over the top. Almost all of Downmill Stream disappeared in this way, as did the southern part of Bull Brook, and most of Blackmoor Stream.

The Cut has its source near Ascot Place in Winkfield. A number of small streams supply three ornamental lakes, which also receive water from Blackmoor Stream. This rises further south at Englemere Pond, a shallow acidic pond located in the 68.2-acre (27.6 ha) Englemere Pond Nature Reserve, which is a Site of Special Scientific Interest (SSSI) and a Local Nature Reserve (LNR). Much of Blackmoor Stream, including all of the northern section, runs underground in a culvert. Ascot Place itself is a late-18th century country house set in 270 acres (110 ha) of parkland. Development took place between 1760 and 1790, when the house was built, the stream running through the grounds was dammed to create the three lakes, and much of the surrounding parkland was laid out. Of the lakes, the middle one is the largest, and at its western end is a grade I listed grotto, built by Robert Turnball between 1750 and 1770, so possibly pre-dating the house. Immediately to the west of the grotto is a three-arched bridge, constructed of red brick in the late 18th century. Beyond the third lake, the stream passes out of the park grounds and under Braziers Lane. At Brockhill, it passes Brockhill House, where it feeds a lake which has been there since at least 1879. Between bridges carrying the B3017 and B3022 roads, it is joined by another stream, flowing northwards from Chavey Down.

Continuing westwards, it passes the Meadowbrook Montessori School, one of the first in Britain to cater for primary age children. Wane Bridge carries a minor road called Malt Hill over the river, and then it is joined by two tributaries, one flowing south from Nuptown, and Bull Brook flowing north from Warfield. Like Blackmoor Stream, much of Bull Brook has been culverted as Bracknell has expanded. It begins at two locations, one near Gravel Hill and the other in Swinley Park, which meet in an underground culvert. It appears on the surface near Savernake Pond, which now acts as a balancing pond, slowing the rate at which urban run-off water enters the main watercourses. The pond covers an area of 2.5 acres (1.01 ha). An underground branch connects the sewage treatment works on Whitmoor Bog to the river, after which the culvert flows westwards and then turns north, passing under the housing estate of Bullbrook. A small section is on the surface near Martins Heron railway station and it re-emerges near Jigs Lane South. As it heads to the north, it passes under Harvest Ride, flows to the east of Whitegrove library, and continues under County Lane to enter Warfield Park. Two more bridges carry the B3034 and B3022 roads over its course before it enters the grounds of Warfield House, an early 18th century country house, which was extended in the 19th century and altered in the middle of the 20th century. To the west of the house is a large ornamental lake covering 5.2 acres (2.1 ha), created by a weir at the northern end, after which the channel turns to the north-west before it joins The Cut. The name Warfield is derived from Weir Field, and denoted a place for fishing on The Cut.

The junction with The Cut is just southwest of Warfield Church. This grade II* listed parish church is dedicated to St Michael and All Angels, and was constructed in the 13th century. A north chapel was added in the 14th century, but the nave and transept were rebuilt in the 15th century, so only the north aisle is original. The building was partly restored in 1872 by G E Street.

Beyond the junction, the river turns to the south west, passing under Osbourne Lane and then running between Scotlands Farm and Newell Green to pass under the A3095 road at Bott Bridge. In 2016, some 110 yards (100 m) of the river downstream from the bridge were diverted, to allow a roundabout to be constructed on the B3034, and an access road to a new housing development to cross the river. The project included the creation of a floodwater retention pool, with the associated controls to manage it, and the use of woody material to create backwater habitat along the length of the diversion. As the river passes the end of Watersplash Lane, it is joined by a small tributary flowing north-west from Green Acres, and continues under Harvest Ride. After it reaches Frampton's Bridge, carrying the B3018 road, it is joined by the Downmill Stream, emerging from a culvert. This tributary begins at Gormoor Pond, to the south of a road called Nine Mile Ride, and apart from two lakes at South Hill Park and the Mill Pond at Wildridings, is culverted for most of its 3.3-mile (5.3 km) length. Prior to the establishment of Bracknell, it ran past Downmill Brickworks, on the north side of the railway line. By 1972, the section between the railway and the junction with the cut had been culverted, but south of the railway it was still in the open. Mill Pond was originally what its name suggests, but was enlarged to act as a balancing pond when Bracknell was constructed. It now covers an area of 6.5 acres (2.63 ha).

The Cut from Bott Bridge to Jocks Copse and Tinkers Copse below Frampton Bridge is a designated leisure area called the Cut Countryside Corridor. After the junction with Downmill Stream, the river turns to the north west, passes under two bridges, and enters the grounds of Binfield Manor, a grade II listed 18th century house with 19th century additions, which was altered in the 20th century, and is surrounded by parkland. The river drops down a weir to enter a large lake, with another weir at the northern end, just after a bridge carrying the B3034 road. It then heads generally northwards, passing under several bridges carrying minor roads, and over a ford at Westleymill. To the west of Braywoodside, it comes close to the M4 motorway, and historically turned to the west, to reach the River Loddon. The original course is now called Twyford Brook, but around 1820 a new course was cut, heading north east, to reduce flooding at Ruscombe Lake. The old course remained in water, and there was a small area of marshy ground between the two in 1912, but the construction of the M4 motorway severed the connection. On the new course, there is another weir after the B3024 bridge, and on the final section, it is spanned by the M4 motorway, the A404(M) and A308(M) motorways at the Junction 8/9 roundabout, and the A308 roundabout at the end of the A308(M). It is joined by a tributary called The Bourne near Junction 8/9, and tumbles down a weir to join Bray Cut, part of Maidenhead Waterways.

The course turns to the east, and on the north bank is the grade I listed Jesus Hospital, with its almshouses, chaplain's house and chapel. It was constructed in 1627, when it was founded by William Goddard, and is now managed by the Worshipful Company of Fishmongers. The river continues under the B3024 road and the M4 motorway, beyond which it is flanked by large lakes which were formerly gravel pits. The southern one is Bray Lake, and is used for sailing. At its eastern end is a gravel works and Bray Keleher Water Treatment Works, which processes 45 Ml per day of drinking water from the River Thames, and was being upgraded by South East Water to handle 68 Ml per day, with an expected completion date of 2021. The Cut joins the Thames just above Bray Marina.

== Ecology ==
The river has had a chequered history with regard to its water quality and suffered from pollution, particularly in the 1960s, probably due to the rapid expansion of nearby Bracknell and inadequate sewage treatment by the works at Whitmoor Bog and Ryemead Lane, Winkfield. However, in recent decades things have improved and the river now contains a large population of small chub, along with some roach and gudgeon, though it seems to have limited appeal to anglers. Other fish present are three-spined sticklebacks and stone loach, and the riparian fauna includes kingfisher, grey heron (especially around Warfield House lake), grey wagtail and mink.

The river receives the treated discharges from at least three sewage treatment works, and has a number of weirs, which impede the movement of fish. It also suffers from run-off from roads and industrial estates, but a project to improve the ecology began close to the Jock's Lane recreation ground. The Braybrook Community Nature and Fishing Club had been formed, and its members included a high proportion of junior anglers. They fished on a local pond, and the management committee included both junior members and adults. In order to introduce people to the challenges of fishing on a flowing river, Bracknell Council applied for a grant from the Angling Trust, which was awarded because of the age range of those involved. Ten fishing platforms, including two with disabled access, were constructed by the river. The success of this application led to the club applying to the Environment Agency’s Fisheries Improvement Programme, to see if they could improve the state of the river. Again, a grant was awarded, and work began on cutting down some of the tree canopy, to allow light to reach the water and encourage the growth of aquatic plants. The cut wood was used to create berms, forming meanders and narrowing the channel, so that the velocity of the water increased. This scoured the silt from the bed of the river, revealing clean gravel underneath.

In 2017, there were 13 reported incidents of pollution of the river near Jock's Lane, which killed large numbers of fish. The Environment Agency worked with Thames Water, who are responsible for the drainage network downstream from Bracknell, visiting local businesses to advise on the safe storage and disposal of chemicals and oil, in a bid to stop such incidents happening. As a result of this, the Environment Agency felt it was safe to try restocking the river, and on 14 December 2017 some 1,700 chub, 1,000 dace, 1,000 roach and 300 tench were released near the Jock's Lane recreation ground. All had been reared at the national fish rearing facility at Calverton, Nottinghamshire.

=== Water quality ===
The Environment Agency measure the water quality of the river systems in England. Each is given an overall ecological status, which may be one of five levels: high, good, moderate, poor and bad. There are several components that are used to determine this, including biological status, which looks at the quantity and varieties of invertebrates, angiosperms and fish. Chemical status, which compares the concentrations of various chemicals against known safe concentrations, is rated good or fail.

The water quality of The Cut system was as follows in 2019. The reasons for the quality being less than good included discharge of sewage into the upper reaches, poor livestock management, and physical modification of the channel, which presents barriers to the free movement of fish. The chemical status of the lower reaches has improved, from Fail in 2013 and 2014 to Good in 2015 and 2016. From 2016 to 2019 it deteriorated and the whole stream is now rated Fail again. The Environment Agency designate the Downmill Stream as "Cut to west Bracknell".

Section	Ecological Status	Chemical Status	Overall Status	Length	Catchment	Channel
Cut (Ascot to Bull Brook confluence at Warfield)	Moderate	Fail	Moderate	3.5 miles (5.6 km)	7.89 square miles (20.4 km^{2})	heavily modified
Bull Brook	Moderate	Fail	Moderate	3.2 miles (5.1 km)	5.02 square miles (13.0 km^{2})	heavily modified
Cut (Warfield to north Bracknell)	Moderate	Fail	Moderate	1.7 miles (2.7 km)	1.51 square miles (3.9 km^{2})	
Cut to west Bracknell	Moderate	Fail	Moderate	3.3 miles (5.3 km)	4.37 square miles (11.3 km^{2})	heavily modified
Cut (Binfield to River Thames) and Maidenhead Ditch	Moderate	Fail	Moderate	10.7 miles (17.2 km)	25.91 square miles (67.1 km^{2})	

== See also ==
- Tributaries of the River Thames
- List of rivers of England

== Bibliography ==
- Bowes, Michael J; et al. (1 September 2018). "Weekly water quality monitoring data for the River Thames" (PDF). Centre for Ecology and Hydrology. Archived (PDF) from the original on 28 April 2019.
- Boyd, Milo (18 December 2017). "The Environment Agency is working to re-stock the River Cut following illegal oil dumps". Bracknell News. Archived from the original on 13 June 2020.
- Ditchfield, P H; Page, William, eds. (1923). "Parishes: Ruscombe". A History of the County of Berkshire. Vol. 3. British History Online.
- Ford, David Nash (2020). East Berkshire Town and Village Histories. Nash Ford Publishing. Archived from the original on 15 May 2020.
- Keable, Stuart (19 December 2017). "Partnership working on an urban river: Bracknell's River Cut". Environment Agency. Archived from the original on 26 April 2020.
- Mavor, William (1813). General View of the Agriculture of Berkshire. Sherwood, Neely and Jones.
- Packman, J C; Hewitt, E J (July 1998). "Flood estimation in mixed urban/rural catchments" (PDF). Institute of Hydrology. Archived (PDF) from the original on 3 November 2018.
- SEW (May 2020). "Bray Keleher extension". South East Water. Archived from the original on 13 June 2020.

=== References ===
Next confluence upstream	River Thames	Next confluence downstream
River Wye (north)	The Cut, Berkshire	Colne Brook (north)
