= Bush Ait =

Island in the River Thames, England

Coordinates: 51.4874°N 0.6483°W

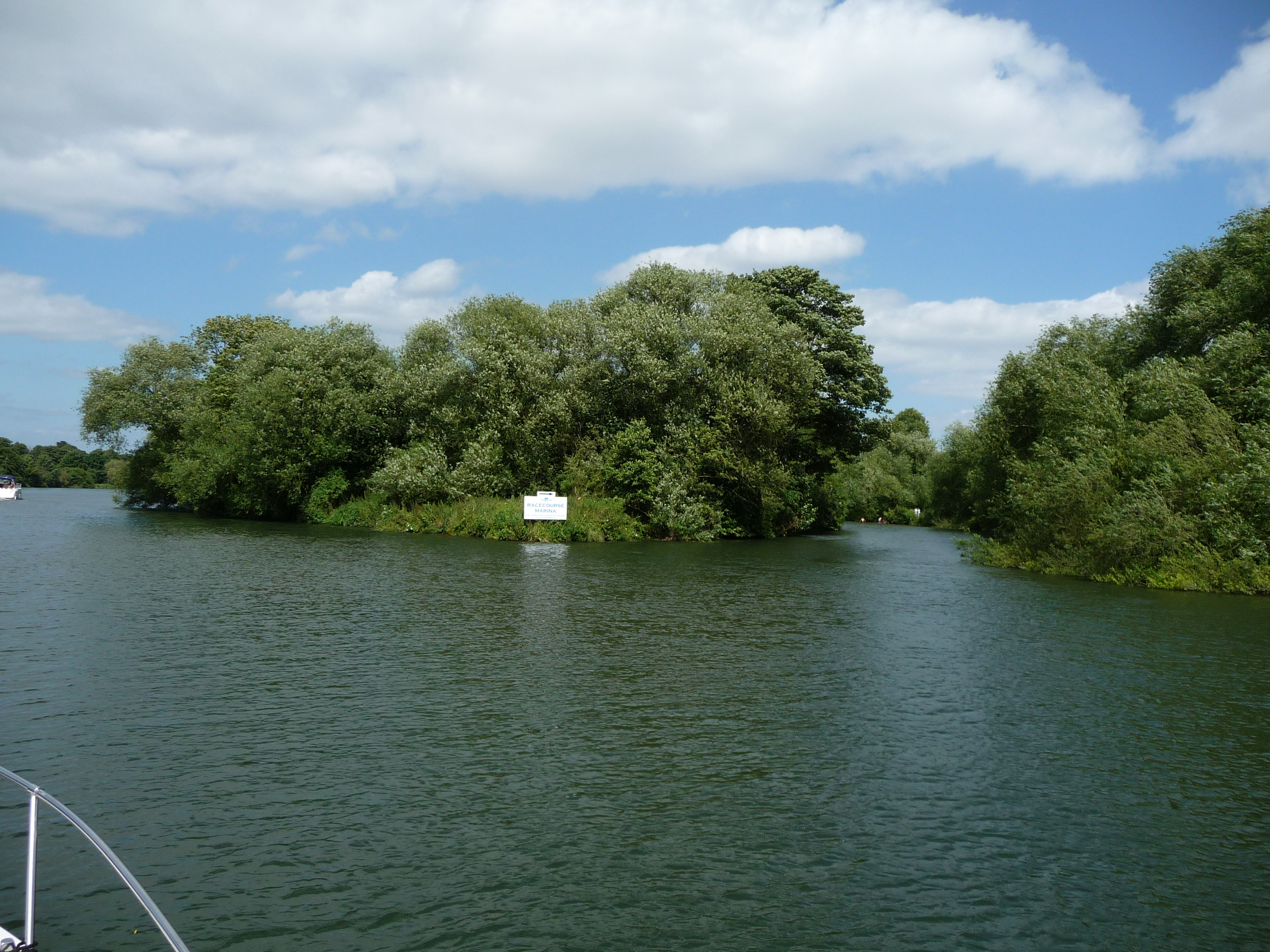
- Bush Ait (upstream side) showing entrance to Clewer Mill Stream

- Location within Berkshire
- Ceremonial county: Berkshire
- Region: South East
- Country: England
- Sovereign state: United Kingdom
- Police: Thames Valley
- Fire: Royal Berkshire
- Ambulance: South Central

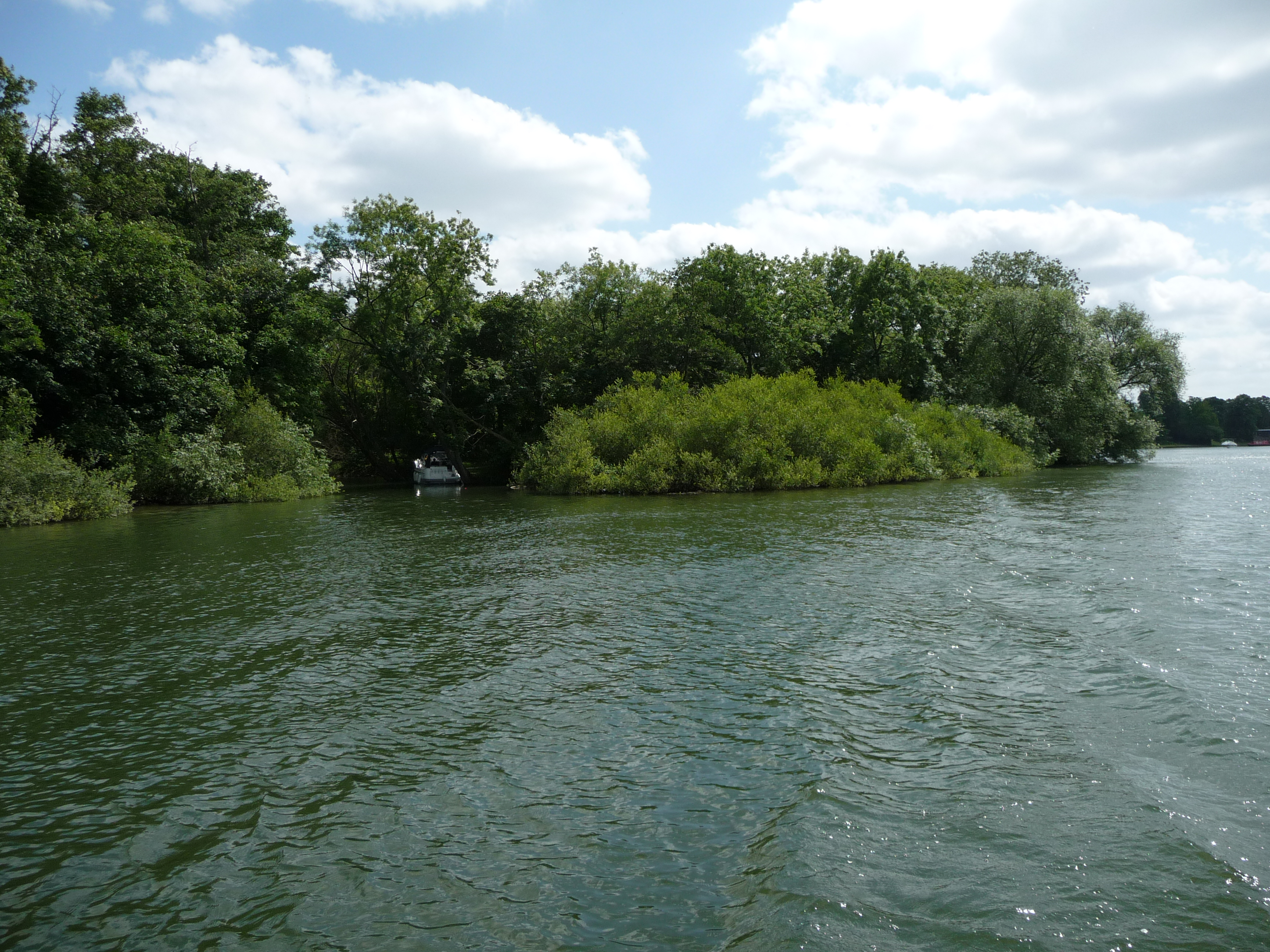
Bush Ait (downstream side)

Bush Ait is an island of Clewer, Berkshire in the Thames on the reach above Boveney Lock at the mouth of the Clewer Mill Stream which leads to Windsor Racecourse Marina. The island is unpopulated and wooded.

== See also ==
- Islands in the River Thames
- Ait

Next island upstream	River Thames	Next island downstream
Queen's Eyot	Bush Ait	Baths Island
