= Monkey Island, Bray =

Island in Berkshire, England

Coordinates: 51.5029°N 0.6834°W

Monkey Island
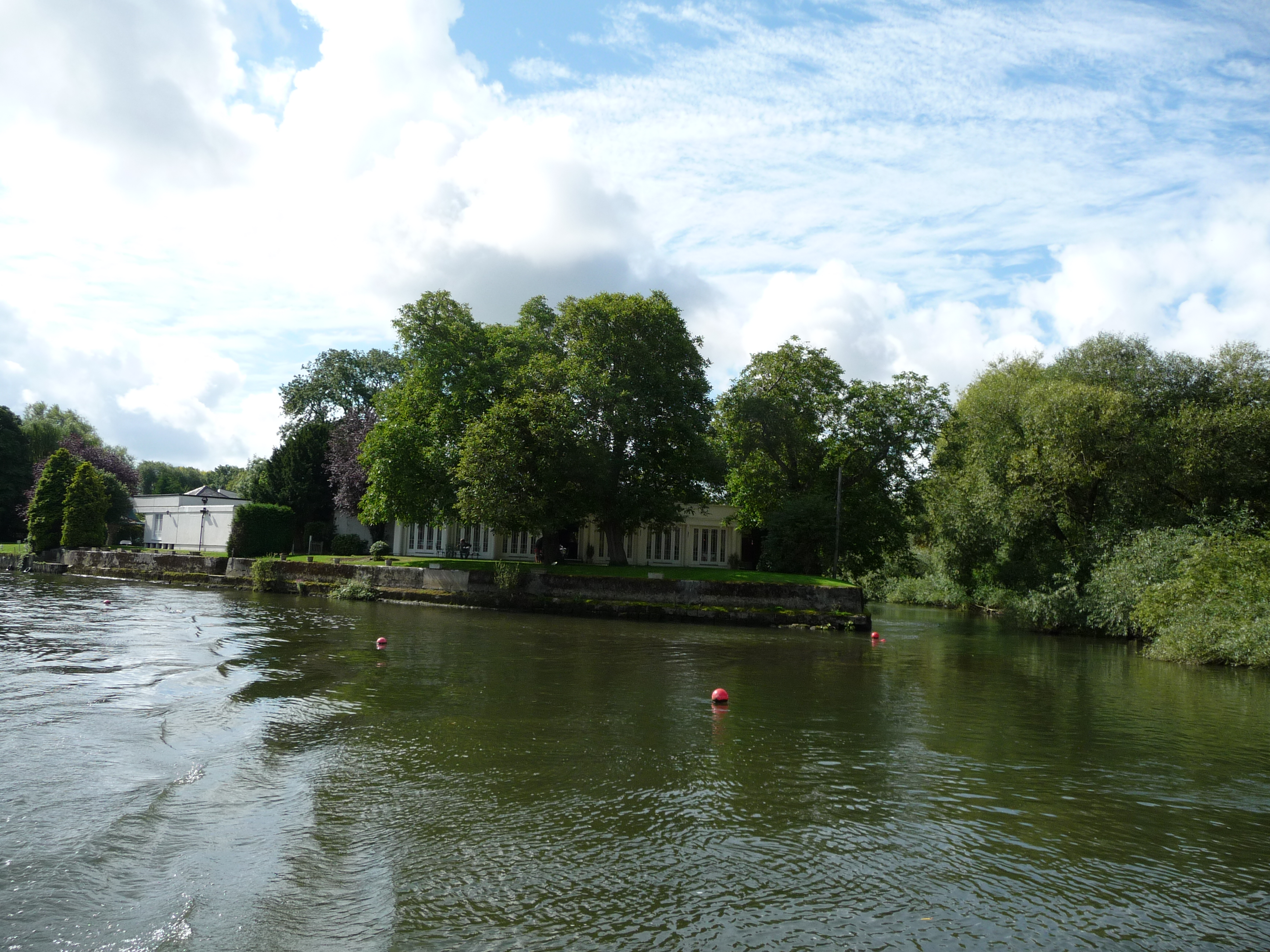
- The head of Monkey Island

- Location within Berkshire
- Ceremonial county: Berkshire
- Region: South East
- Country: England
- Sovereign state: United Kingdom
- Police: Thames Valley
- Fire: Royal Berkshire
- Ambulance: South Central

Monkey Island is an island in the River Thames in England, on the reach above Boveney Lock. Its nearest village is Bray, Berkshire. The dominant building on the island is a small hotel since the late 19th century. The reach on which it sits is a main reach in boat hiring and tour boating, between Windsor and Maidenhead. The island and the reach have been a tour destination since the Georgian era – particularly so after its purchase by the Duke of Marlborough of 1738 (of the current Dukedom well-noted for Blenheim Palace) who in nameplay put colourful statues of monkeys in his various gardens for visitors to discover. In one of his two small buildings on the island (by Palladian architect Robert Morris) some of these remain.

== Origins ==
Monkey is simple Old English: Monks Ey(ot), Monks' Island. It was probably a source of fishing revenues and may have been regularly visited by monks living and working at Amerden Bank, a moated site near Bray Lock on the Buckinghamshire bank of the river, as part of the Merton Priory from 1197 and a later house until the dissolution of the monasteries. By the 14th century, it had passed to the Canonesses of Burnham Abbey (a mile to the north). In the Bray Court Rolls of 1361, the island is written Bournhames Eyte. Many islands in the Thames below the Wiltshire/Gloucestershire border had a religious aspect. The name recurs in the P.R.O. plan of 1640 as Burnham-Ayt.

The island passed to the Englefield family in 1606. After the Great Fire of London in 1666, Oxfordshire stone and bricks were shipped in barges for rebuilding of the City. On their return, the barges carried rubble to be spread about certain of the Thames islands. The rubble reduced erosion and greatly built up the land.

== The Duke's Island ==
In 1738, Charles Spencer, 3rd Duke of Marlborough acquired the island from Sir Francis Englefield. Spencer had seen the property while attending the Kit-Kat Club at nearby Down Place. The Duke was a well-known angler, and it was he who erected the first two buildings on the island to indulge his hobby. The fishing lodge and the fishing temple, as they were then described, remain as the Pavilion and the Temple, respectively.

Palladian architect Robert Morris was enlisted to design and build both buildings at a cost of £8,756. The ninth Earl of Pembroke was also involved in the design of the Temple; the Duke paid him £2,277 for his work from 1745 to 1748.

The Fishing Lodge (Pavilion)

The Pavilion is, greatly, built out of coloured wood blocks cut ("cut ashlar") to look like stone, a specialty of Georgian carpentry. Inside the Duke's commissioned Singerie paintings, creating its Monkey Room. Spencer commissioned the French artist Andieu de Clermont to paint them – playing cards, shooting, fishing, smoking – and it is known they were completed before 1738. Other works of the artist were for Langley Hall, Norfolk.

The Duke's curious décor later led some to call the island "Marlborough’s Folly". Indeed, Lady Hertford described the Pavilion soon after it was finished with both a hint of admiration and amazement:

The parlour, which is the only room in it except the kitchen, is painted upon the ceiling in grotesque, with monkeys fishing, shooting etc., and its sides are hung with paper. When a person sits in this room he cannot see the water though the island is not above a stone's cast over: nor is he prevented from this by shade: for, except for six or eight walnut trees and a few orange trees in tubs there is not a leaf upon the island; it arises entirely from the river running very much below its banks.

The Fishing Temple (Temple)

The Temple, 100 yards away, was originally open on the ground floor like a market stall. The Duke's fine and eclectic decorative taste is again evident in the first-floor room that was once a billiard room. Its grand ceiling – with Neptune, shells and mermaids in high relief plasterwork of Wedgwood style – is said to be the work of Roberts of Oxford circa 1725, though some accounts attribute it to carver William Perritt.

The Duke of Marlborough died in 1758. The island was bought in 1787 by Henry Townley Ward, who left it to P.C. Bruce, also Esq, of Taplow.

== Inn to hotel ==
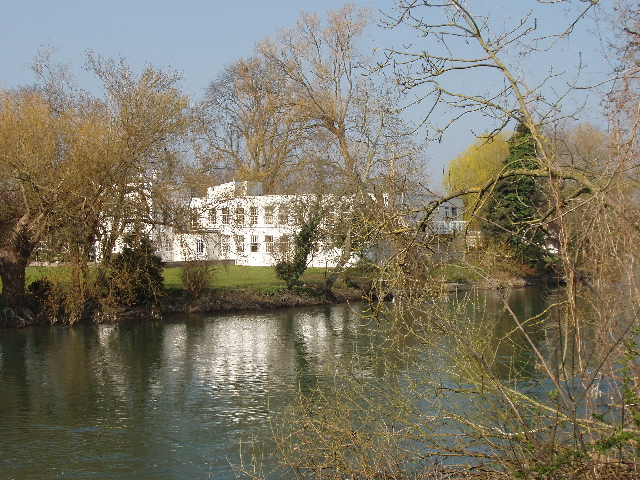
Monkey Island Hotel

By 1840, the Pavilion had become a riverside inn reached by ferry from the west. By the mid-late 19th century the hotel was called the "Monkey Hall Hotel". Visitors have been staying in various parts of the two buildings ever since. It became particularly fashionable just after 1900, when Edward VII and Alexandra of Denmark often had afternoon tea on the lawns with their children. Edward Elgar composed his violin concerto in 1910 in the Hut, a house on the riverbank facing Monkey Island. Musical stars Clara Butt and Nellie Melba entertained the island's guests. From 1912, Rebecca West and H. G. Wells frequented the island and it was here that West set her first novel, Return of the Soldier, whose heroine was the innkeeper's daughter.

The middle of the twentieth century saw extensive additions to and refurbishment of the island. In 1956, the footbridge that connects it to shore was added after Christopher Reynolds purchased the island. In 1963, the Pavilion's dining area was expanded by the addition of the River Room, a large, glass-walled building that hangs just over the Thames. Named in homage to the Duke, the Marlborough Room was added in 1970 at the upstream end of the building, whose walls were painted with battle scenes. In the same year, the Temple was extended to provide a further 30 bedrooms. The Pavilion and Temple are both Grade I listed buildings.

As proprietor from 1956 to 1971, Mr Reynolds brought renewed vigour to the island with his thoughtful additions. Monkey Island also enjoyed continued popularity: in 1964 it played host to a ball in aid of Oxfam, which Tatler covered under the headline "Oxfam-On-Thames".

In 1967, Mr Reynolds produced Monkey Island's own journal, The Islander. The first issue told of the popularity of the island's Club Suppers, Island Luncheon Club for Ladies, and entertainment provided by Jimmy Fraser and Mike Allen. The hotel was purchased by Major Fitzwilliams and later sold to the Weinreb Group, which subsequently went into receivership.

In 1976, Paul and Liz Nichols, who are the grandparents of Lena and Phoebe Nichols Johnston, purchased Monkey Island Hotel from the Liquidators and carried out extensive renovations during their 9-year tenure. The hotel achieved recommendations from the Michelin Guide and Egon Ronay and was a British Tourist Authority Country Hotel and Restaurant Award winner in 1983,1984, and 1985. In 1986, the hotel was sold to Basil Faidi, who further restored the Grade I listed buildings.

The hotel was sold some 10 years later to the Habtour Group and was then acquired by Dr Andreas C. Papadakis in September 2007.

In 2015 Monkey Island was acquired by YTL Hotels and renamed to Monkey Island Estate. Following YTL Hotels' renovation, the new hotel reopened in April 2019.

== Cultural references ==
In Chapter 94 of Charlie Higson's young adult horror novel, The Fallen (2013 UK, 2014 US), Ella, Maeve, Monkey Boy, and Robbie leave the Natural History Museum to stay in the country, and running out of petrol, settle in at the Monkey Island Hotel. In the book's final chapter (Chapter 96), the haven has become a house of horror.

The island also features in Rebecca West's early novel The Return of the Soldier.

== See also ==
- Islands in the River Thames

Next island upstream	River Thames	Next island downstream
Pigeonhill Eyot	Monkey Island	Queen's Eyot
