= Pigeonhill Eyot =

Island in the River Thames

Coordinates: 51.5080°N 0.6884°W

Pigeonhill Eyot is an island in the River Thames in England just above Bray Lock, near Bray, Berkshire. It sits between the lock and Headpile Eyot and lock weirs run from the island to the Bray bank.

The island is small and tree-covered and Bronze Age artifacts have been found here.

== See also ==
- Islands in the River Thames

Next island upstream	River Thames	Next island downstream
Headpile Eyot	Pigeonhill Eyot	Monkey Island
