= M4 Thames Bridge =

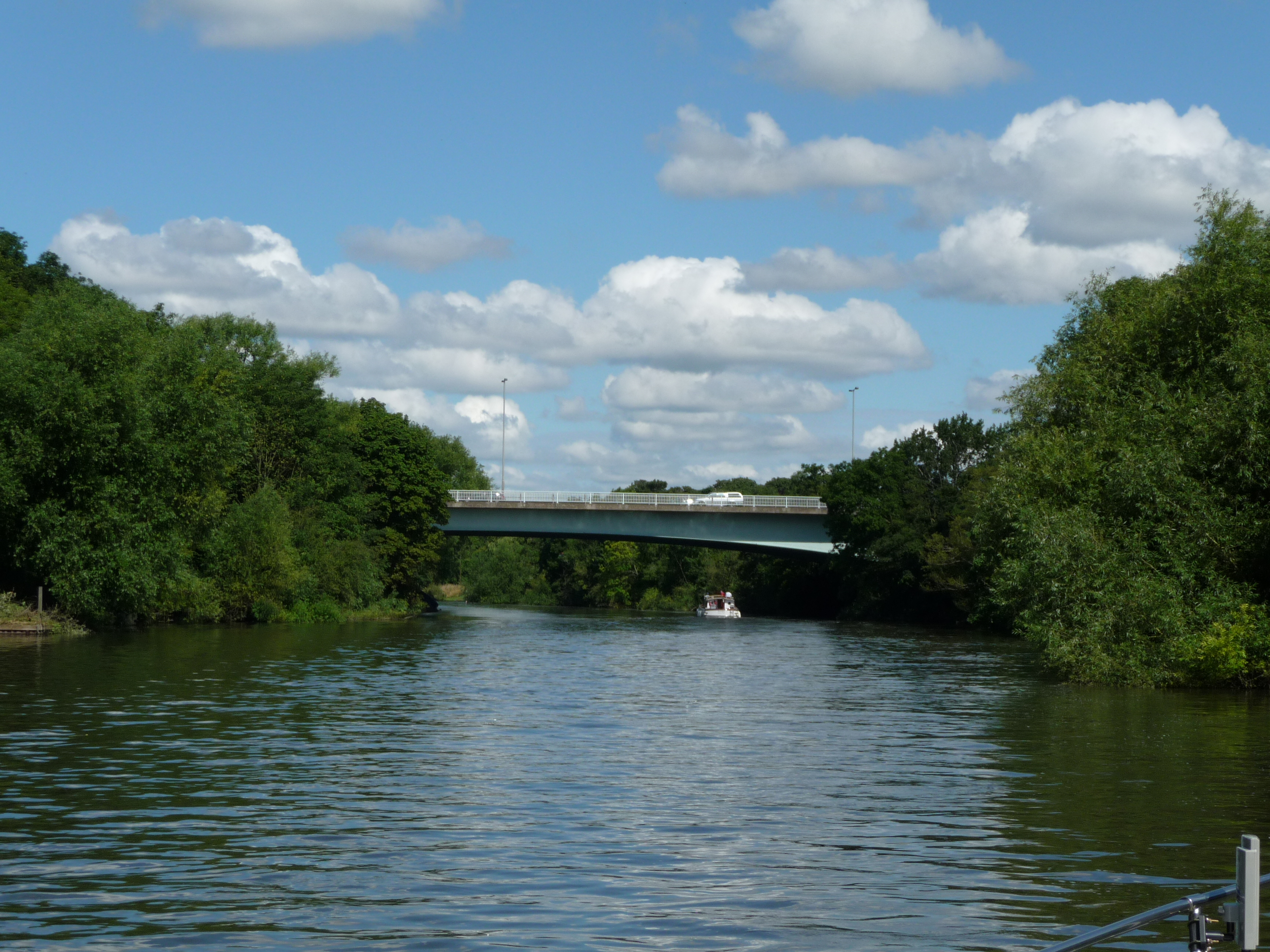
- M4 Thames Bridge (downstream side)
- Coordinates: 51°30′24″N 0°41′09″W
- Carries: M4
- Crosses: River Thames
- Locale: Dorney Reach, Buckinghamshire and Bray, Berkshire

Characteristics
- Material: Steel & Concrete
- Height: 25 feet 6 inches (7.77 m)

The M4 Thames Bridge Maidenhead is a motorway bridge between Dorney Reach, Buckinghamshire and Bray near Maidenhead, Berkshire in England built in the 1960s.

The bridge carries the M4 Motorway across the River Thames, on the reach above Boveney Lock, and about 500 yards short of Bray Lock. It is one of three bridges carrying motorway traffic across the Thames, the others being the M25 Runnymede Bridge (just below Bell Weir Lock) and the M3 Chertsey Bridge. There is also a pedestrian walkway on either side of the bridge, which allows people to access Bray Village from the Dorney side of the Thames.

== See also ==
- Crossings of the River Thames

Next crossing upstream	River Thames	Next crossing downstream
Maidenhead Railway Bridge	M4 Thames Bridge	Summerleaze Footbridge
