= Headpile Eyot =

Eyot in the River Thames in England

Coordinates: 51.5100°N 0.6943°W

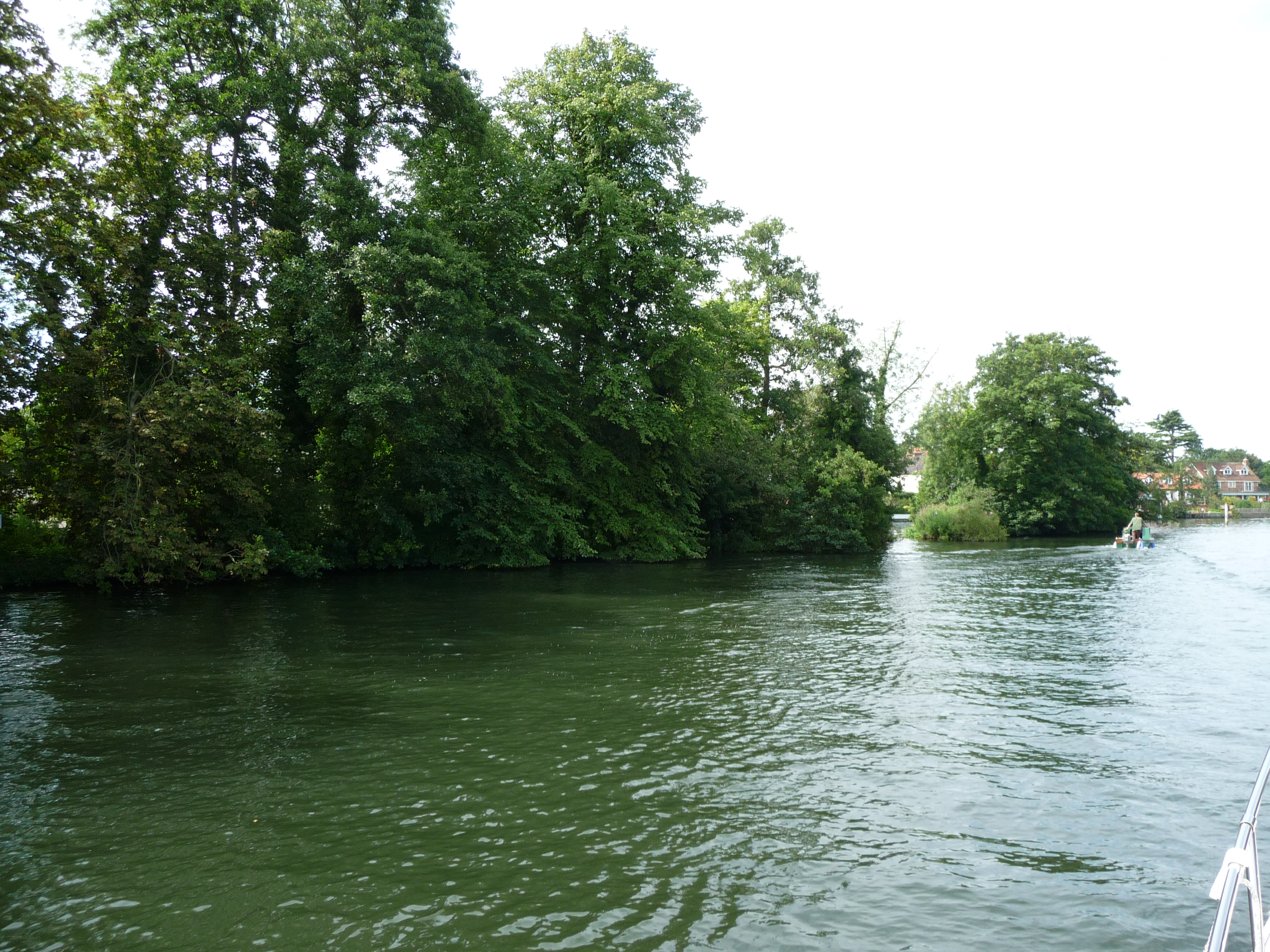
Headpile Eyot looking upstream with small unnamed island beyond

Headpile Eyot is long and narrow eyot in the River Thames, situated just above Bray Lock. It is also near the village of Bray, Berkshire. The island is small and covered with trees such as Horse chestnut and English oaks. Bronze Age finds have been found on the Eyot.

== See also ==
- Islands in the River Thames

Next island upstream	River Thames	Next island downstream
Guards Club Island	Headpile Eyot	Pigeonhill Eyot
