= Maidenhead Regatta =

Rowing regatta in Berkshire, England

Maidenhead Regatta is a rowing regatta in England which takes place in Maidenhead, Berkshire. It is held in August.

The regatta, which was founded in 1893, attracts top crews from around the UK. It is organised by Maidenhead Rowing Club. Until 2007, the regatta was held on the River Thames on the reach above Bray Lock. Racing took place on a 500-metre upstream course finishing at Maidenhead Railway Bridge. In 2007 the regatta moved to Dorney Lake, Buckinghamshire, but it returned to the river in Maidenhead in 2009.

== See also ==
- Rowing on the River Thames
