= Queen's Eyot =

Island in the River Thames, England

Coordinates: 51.49661°N 0.679629°W

Map showing the location of Queen's Eyot within Berkshire.

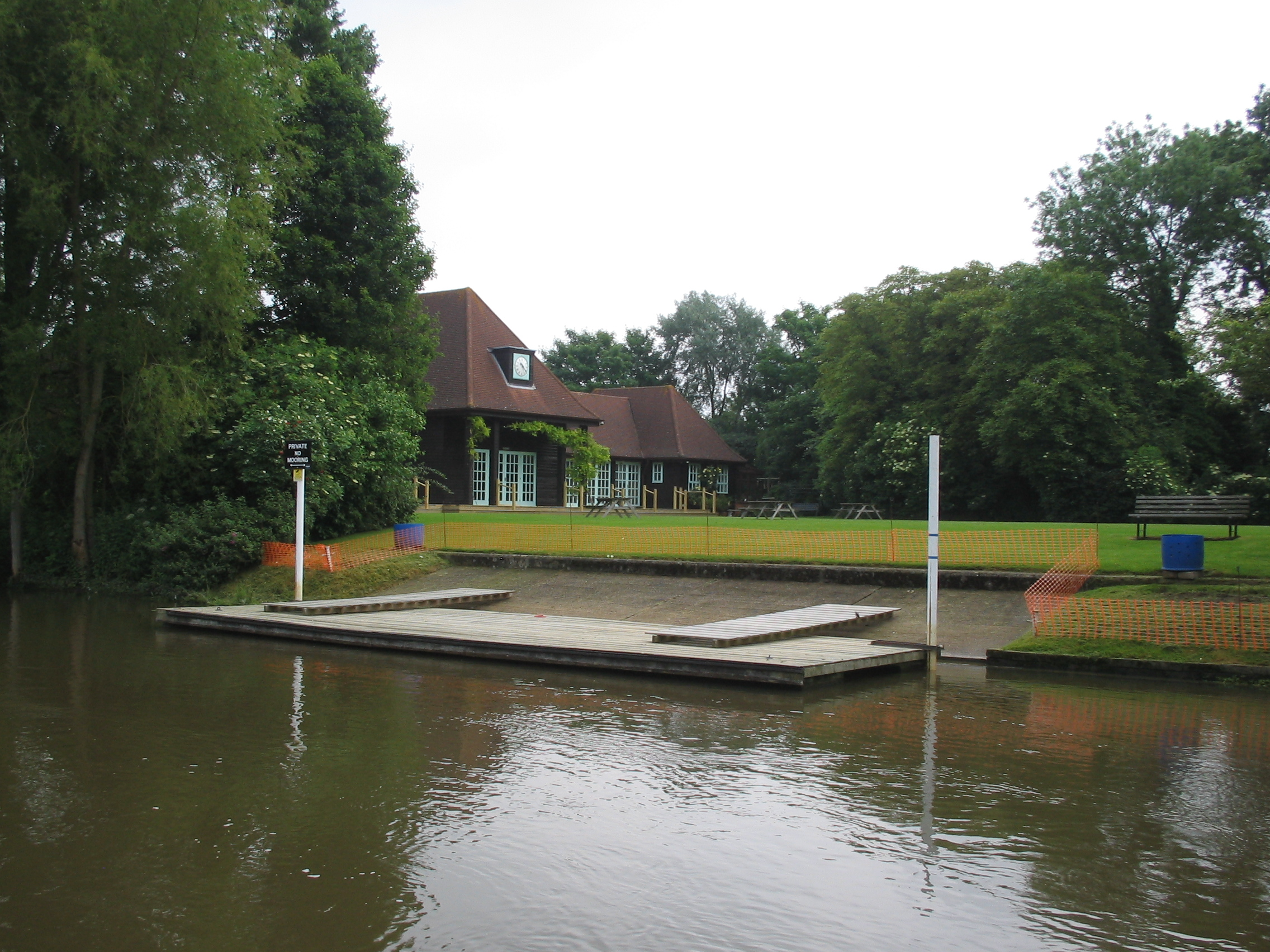
Queens Eyot Clubhouse

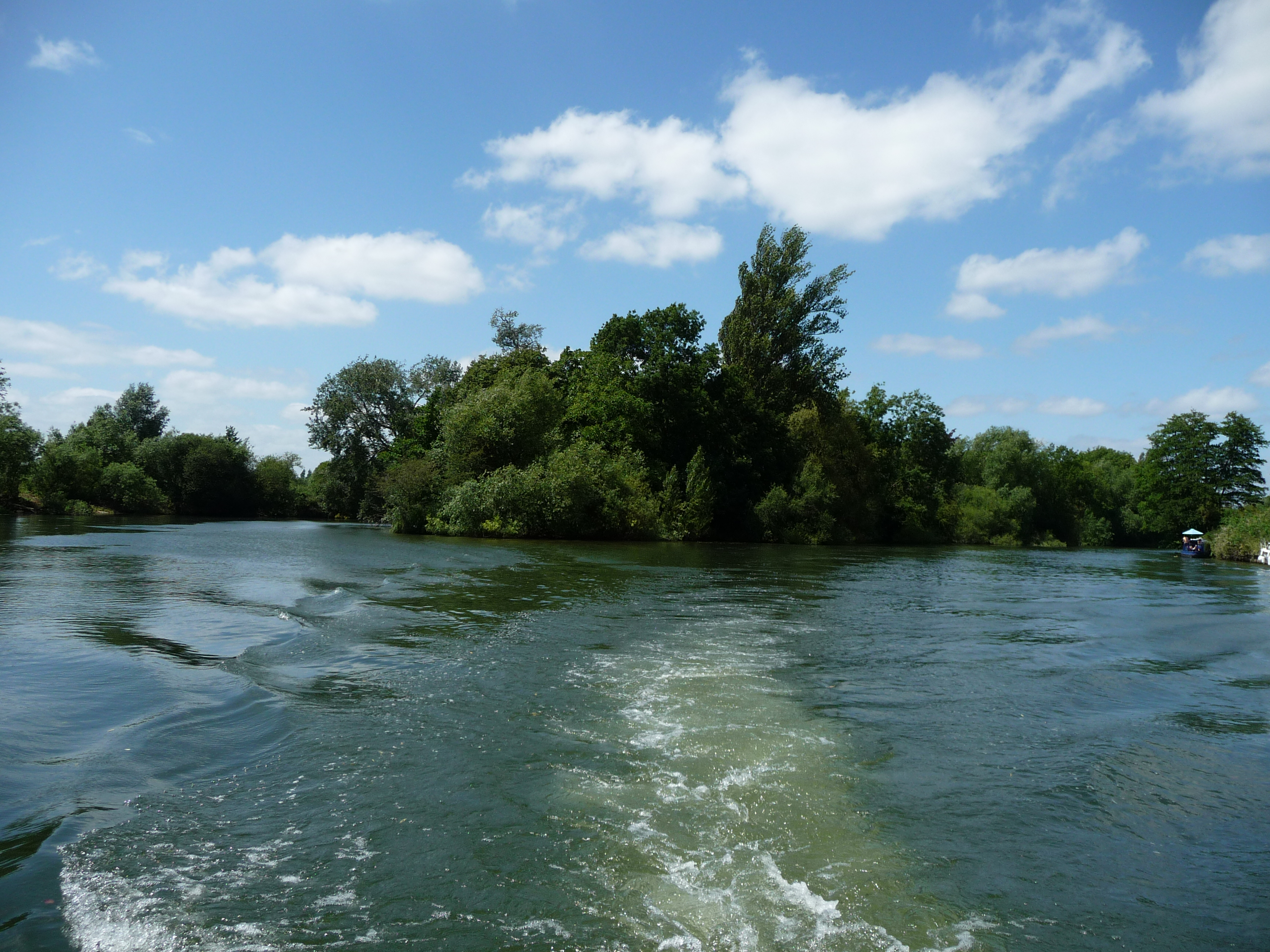
Queens Eyot from downstream)

Queen's Eyot is an island in the River Thames in England on the reach above Boveney Lock, just upstream of Oakley Court near Windsor, Berkshire.

The island is owned by Eton College and contains a club house that is available for hire for functions.

== See also ==
- Islands in the River Thames

Next island upstream	River Thames	Next island downstream
Monkey Island	Queen's Eyot	Bush Ait
