= Clewer Mill Stream =

Stream in Berkshire, England

Coordinates: 51.4867°N 0.6239°W

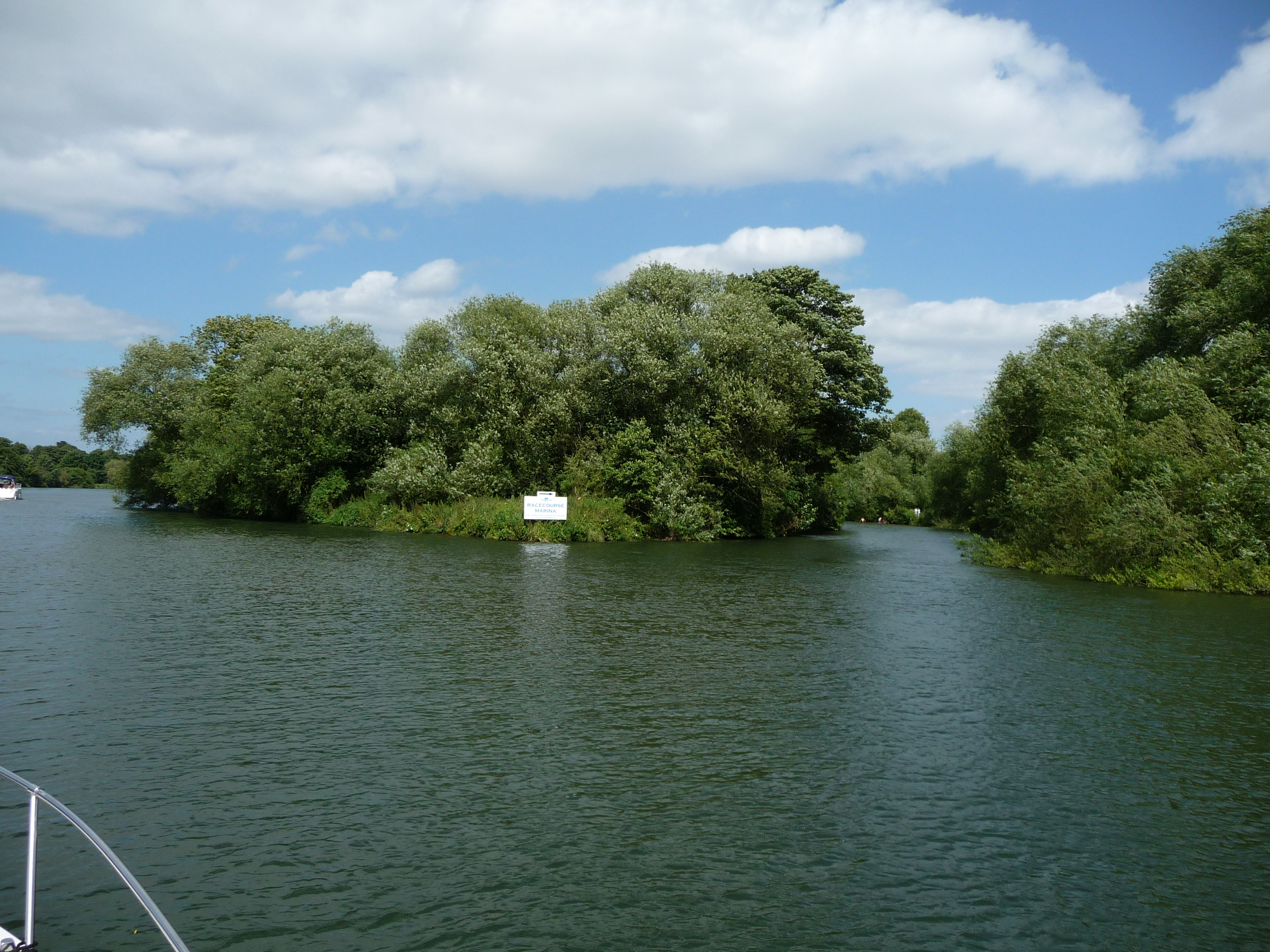
Upstream entrance to Clewer Mill Stream above Bush Ait

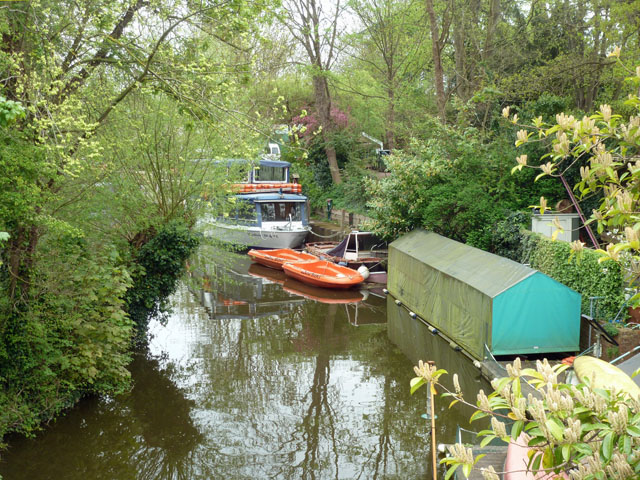
Clewer Mill Stream at French Brothers just above the downstream confluence

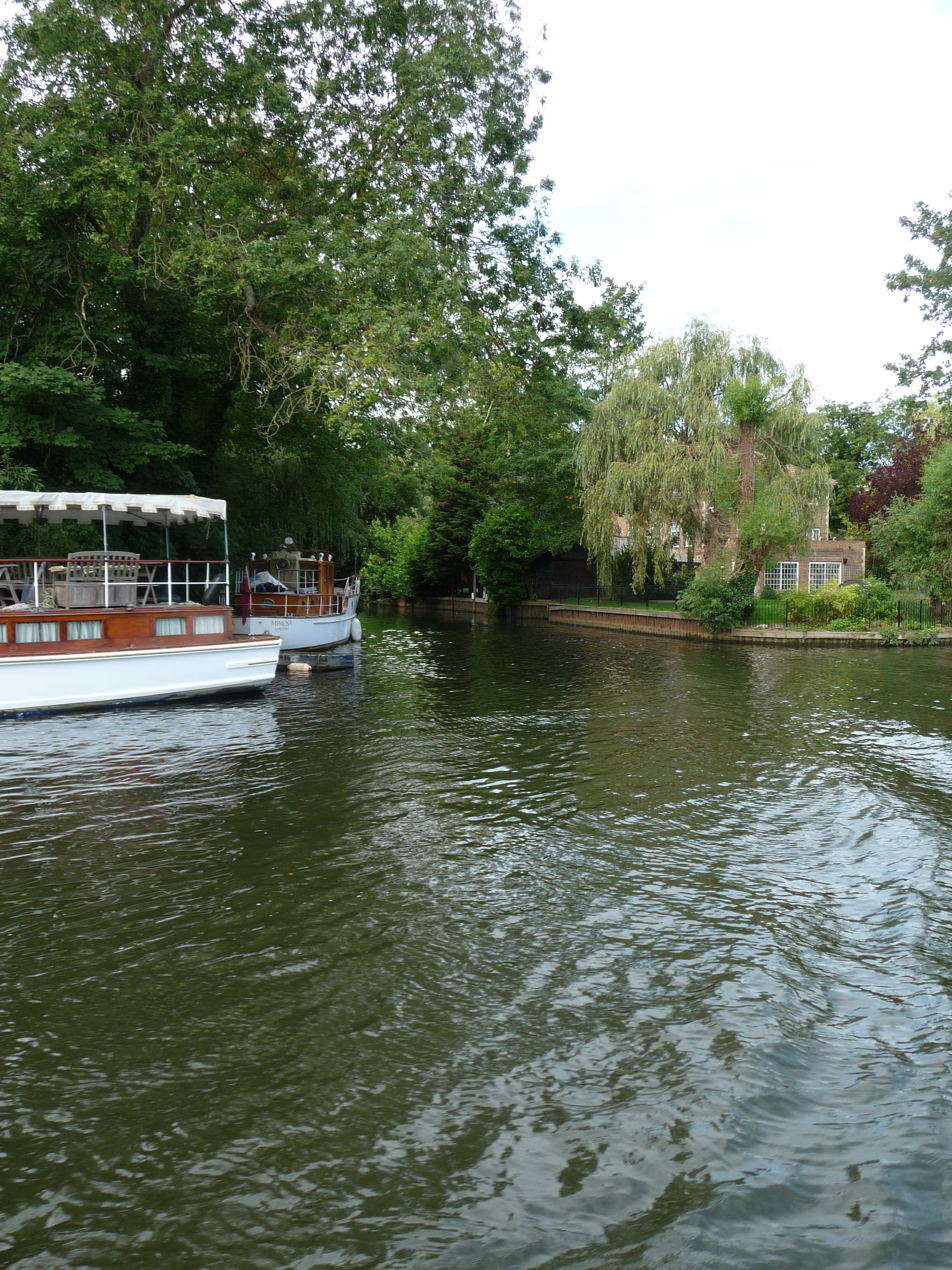
Clewer Mill Stream re-entering the main channel above Queen Elizabeth Bridge

Clewer Mill Stream is a narrow twisting backwater of the River Thames near Windsor, Berkshire, England, which leaves the main river at Bush Ait and rejoins just above Queen Elizabeth Bridge. It is about 1.5 miles long. Clewer Mill Stream is named after the watermill that it once drove.

Clewer Mill Stream has provided food, power, fresh water, safe harbour and navigable access to the Thames for the small settlement of Clewer since the 10th century. In 1198 the Knights Templars of Bisham granted a fishery at Clewer to Richard de Sifrewast. The corn mill at Clewer was first mentioned in the Domesday Book with a value of 10 shillings and there has been a building on the site ever since. In 1781 the mill burnt down and its machinery, which had been visited by George III as it was so "singular and curious", was destroyed. The mill was rebuilt after the fire, and although the water level was affected by the building of the weirs at Romney and Boveney Locks, Clewer Mill was operational until the late 19th century. In the 1920s Clewer Mill House was the home of a Mrs Moscockle who used to dress like Queen Mary and wave regally to pedestrians from her Rolls-Royce as she was driven around Windsor.

Clewer Mill Stream was once a popular haunt of schoolboys from nearby Eton College although it was, along with the Thames itself, officially out-of-bounds and a punishment of 100 lines could be given by a sixth former to any "lower boy" (roughly the first two years) caught "shooting [water birds] in the Clewer Stream". An account from the 1840s of life at Eton describes the thrill of sculling up the backwater to the mill and waiting until the "miller was at dinner" to carry one's skiff around the mill wheel and launch it into the "mill-stream where it was really dangerous, above the wheel".

The 165-acre (0.67 km^{2}) tract of land between Clewer Mill Stream and the main channel of the Thames is a meadow called The Rays which has been used for horse racing meetings since 1866. It is now the site of Royal Windsor Racecourse.

The upstream part of Clewer Mill Stream from Bush Ait forms the entrance channel to Windsor Racecourse Marina, providing a maximum draft of 11 feet (3.4 m), but much less during drought. The downstream section, below the marina is unnavigable by powered craft except for a short reach from the mouth of the stream upstream to Clewer Boatyard. At the downstream end, just before the stream rejoins the main river Thames, is White Lilies Island.

Next confluence upstream	River Thames	Next confluence downstream
York Stream (south)	Clewer Mill Stream	Jubilee River (north)
