= Maidenhead Railway Bridge =

Railway bridge in Maidenhead, England

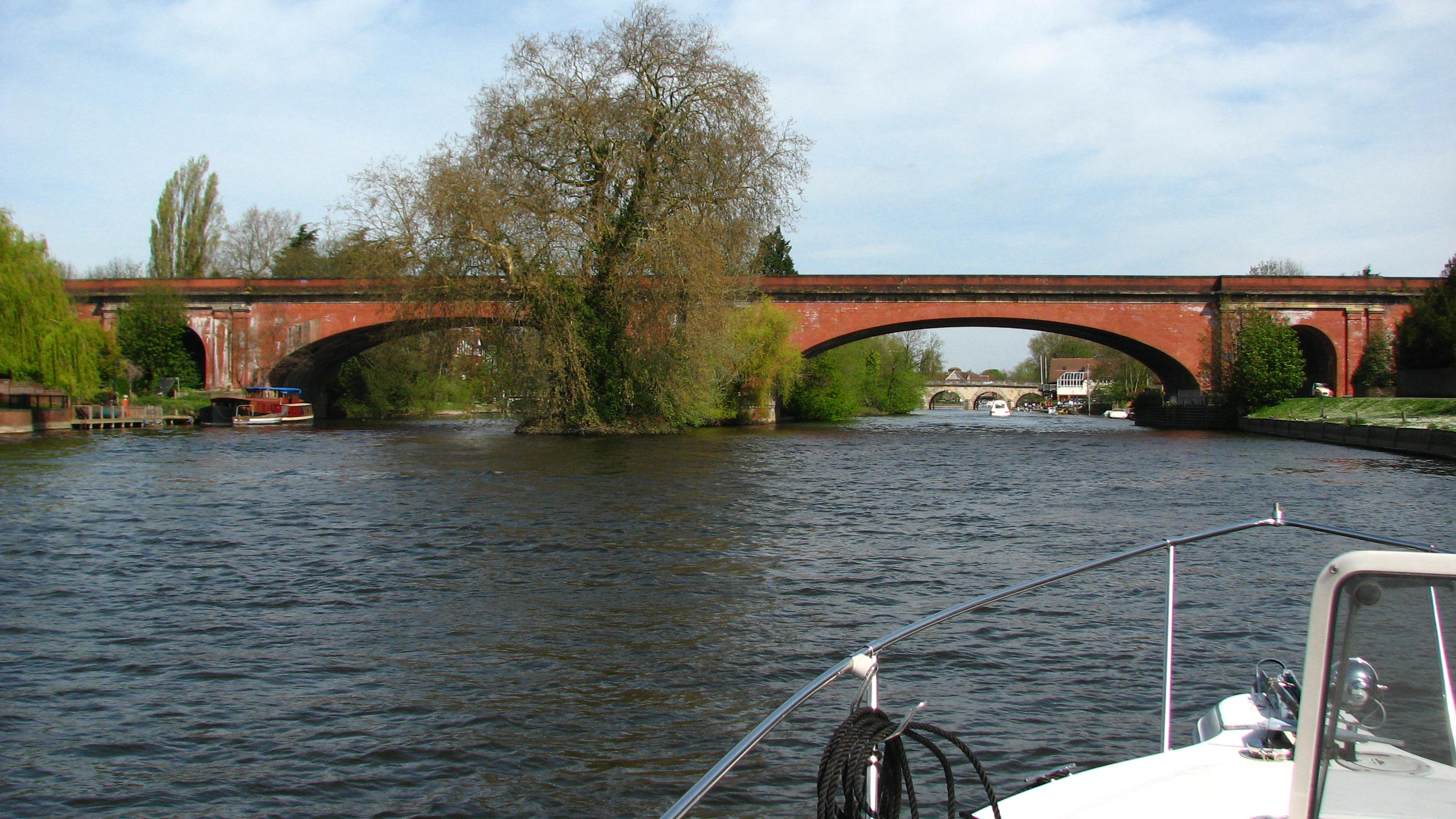
- Maidenhead Railway Bridge prior to electrification
- Coordinates: 51°31′16″N 0°42′06″W
- Carries: Great Western Railway
- Crosses: River Thames
- Locale: Maidenhead
- Heritage status: Grade I listed

Characteristics
- Design: Arch
- Material: Brick
- Height: 32 feet 2 inches (9.80 m)
- Longest span: Each span 128 feet 0 inches (39.01 m)
- No. of spans: 2
- Clearance below: (?)

History
- Designer: Isambard Kingdom Brunel
- Opened: 1 July 1839

Location
- Interactive map of Maidenhead Railway Bridge

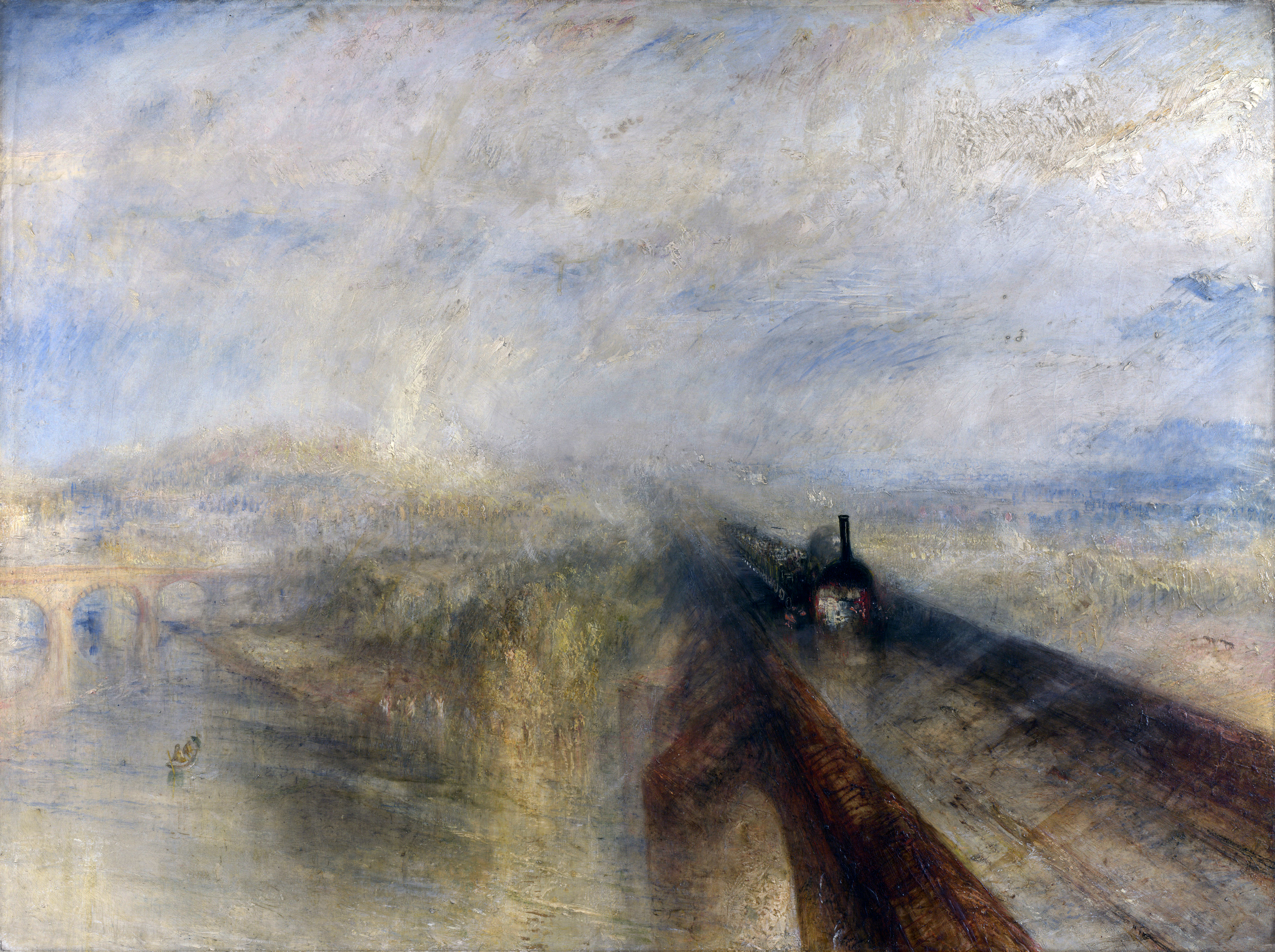
Maidenhead Railway Bridge depicted by J. M. W. Turner in a painting from 1844

Maidenhead Railway Bridge, also known as Maidenhead Viaduct and The Sounding Arch, carries the Great Western Main Line (GWML) over the River Thames between Maidenhead, Berkshire and Taplow, Buckinghamshire, England. It is a single structure of two tall, wide red-brick arches buttressed by two over-land smaller arches. It crosses the river on the Maidenhead-Bray Reach, between Boulter's Lock and Bray Lock, and is near-centrally rooted in the downstream end of a very small island.

The Maidenhead Bridge was designed by Isambard Kingdom Brunel. It was completed in 1838, but not brought into use until 1 July 1839.

The low-rise arches of the structure attracted considerable criticism, relating to their alleged lack of stability. The centring for the arches was left in place until its destruction during a storm in 1839, the arches stayed up, vindicating Brunel's design. During 1861, dual-gauge track was installed across the structure, allowing both broad gauge and standard gauge services to cross it. During the late 1890s, the bridge was widened on either side to allow the structure to carry four standard gauge tracks, a task supervised by Sir John Fowler.

Today, the Maidenhead Bridge forms a key crossing along the eastern section of the Great Western Main Line, allowing trains to travel to and from the line's terminus in the capital, London Paddington station. During the 2010s, the tracks across the structure were provided with overhead line equipment to allow electric trains to use the route.

The Maidenhead Bridge features in Rain, Steam and Speed – The Great Western Railway, painted by J. M. W. Turner during 1844, which is now in the National Gallery, London.

The bridge is approximate to the finish line of the Maidenhead Regatta. The Thames towpath passes directly under the right-hand arch (facing upstream), which is known as the "Sounding Arch", due to its spectacular echo. During July 2012, the bridge was upgraded to a Grade I listed structure. The arches of the structure remain the flattest ever constructed.

== History ==
=== Background ===
During the 1830s, the famed mechanical and civil engineer Isambard Kingdom Brunel developed a plan for a 118-mile-long (190 km) railway running on an east–west alignment in between the key cities of London and Bristol. The line, which became known as the Great Western Railway, displayed exceptional attention to maintaining either level ground, or gentle gradients of no greater than 1 in 1000, on the majority of the route. A key river crossing of the railway occurred between Maidenhead, Berkshire, and Taplow, Buckinghamshire, where the line would cross over the Thames, and Brunel himself undertook the design for that structure.

The building of a bridge over the Thames at that location had to make provision for the necessary navigational clearance, so as not to unduly hinder the river shipping. However, that clearance requirement, when combined with Brunel's desire to maintain a gentle gradient of 1 in 1,320 for the railway lines, posed some problems for the bridge's design. Brunel was very averse to allowing any compromise of the gradient which had been set for the whole route, because he believed it would negatively affect both passenger comfort and the maximum speeds of trains.

The first plan devised by Brunel for the river crossing was for the building of triple-arch viaduct at the site, but he chose to discard that in favour of the design that was subsequently built and is still in use today. According to author Paul Clements, the design selected by Brunel had been directly inspired by earlier experiments performed by his father, Marc Brunel, during 1832, which Isambard had financed. Isambard employed calculus principles in the designing of the bridge's critical semi-elliptical arches which supported the structure. In common with the design of the other large bridges along the line, Brunel achieved a reduction in the forces acting through the brickwork via the adoption of internal longitudinal walls and voids. They served to lighten the superstructure above the arches, as well as reducing the overall weight of the bridge.

The bridge carries the railway across the river on a deck supported by a pair of elliptical brick arches which, at the time of their construction, were the widest and flattest in the world. Each arch has a span of 128 feet (39 m), combined with a rise of only 24 feet (7.3 m). The flatness of the arches was deemed necessary to avoid creating a raised "hump" on the deck of that bridge, which would have gone against Brunel's accommodation of the performance of the locomotives of the time, and his practice of maximising operational economy by building lines with flat or very gentle gradients (locally 1 in 1,320, which is less than 0.1 per cent), which had the benefit of reducing the running costs of the trains.

=== Construction ===
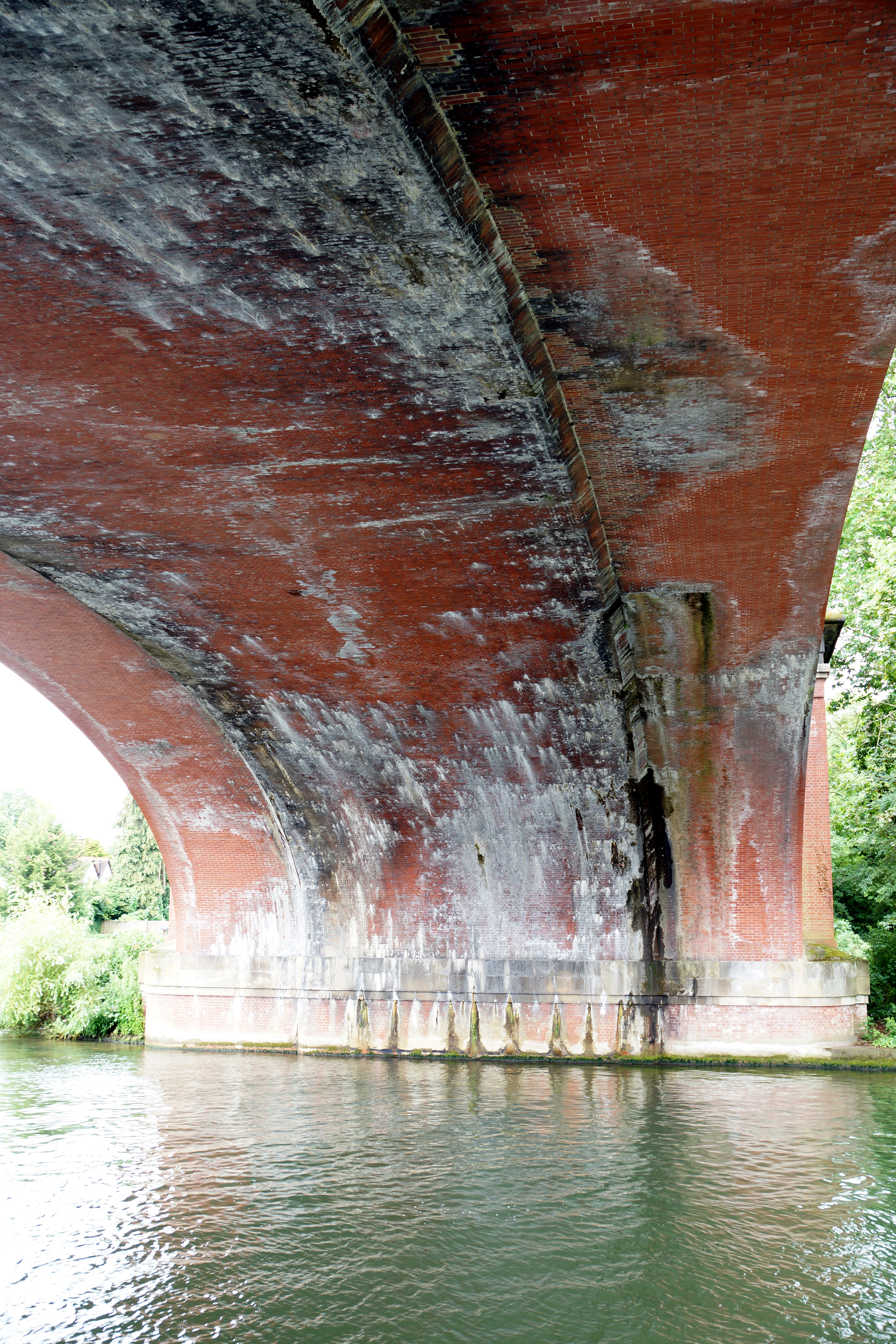
The echoing 'Sounding Arch' from the bank. The chamfered original centre section can be seen.

On 31 August 1835, the Great Western Railway Act was passed by Parliament, authorising the building of the line. Work commenced on its construction during the following year. The resident engineer who oversaw the building of Maidenhead Bridge was John Wallis Hammond, while William Chadwick was appointed as the contractor for the construction of the structure.

As originally built, the Maidenhead Bridge possessed a length of 235 metres and a width of 9.1 metres. It was visually symmetrical about the central river pier, which was founded on top of an existing small island sited roughly midstream in the river. The two main arches had a semi-elliptical shape, each having a span of 39 metres with a very low rise of 7.4 metres. The approach viaducts featured four round-headed flood arches. The short arches nearest the river bank had a span of 6.4 metres while the six flanking arches each had an 8.5 metre span. The elevations were identical and had Doric pilasters positioned between the river and bankside arches, with corniced parapets throughout, while the deck comprised a series of stone slabs. The brickwork, both on the elevations and under the arches, was executed in London stock brick.

The innovative low-rise arches over the Thames became the subject of considerable controversy concerning their stability or purported lack thereof. During the construction of the bridge, the timber centring used to build the arches was eased; on the eastern arch, the three lowest rings of brickwork began to settle, separating from the body of the arch across a section of between 7.6 metres and 9.1 metres. Critics were keen to cite that as proof that the design of the arches was flawed. However, it was soon established that the problem was the result of the mortar having not been fully hardened, while it also appeared worse on the spandrels than midway underneath the arches. During July 1838, William Chadwick, the contractor, acknowledged his responsibility for the situation.

Remedial work was carried out before the centring was eased again in October 1838, and it was then left in place over the winter. Author E.T. MacDermot has claimed that, as the bridge neared completion, the board of the Great Western Railway themselves had doubts that the arches would be able to stay up under the weight of passing trains and issued an order to Brunel, instructing him to leave the wooden formwork used to construct the arches in place. However, Brunel decided to lower it slightly so that it provided no structural effect, although it gave the appearance of supporting the bridge. Later on, the formwork was washed away during heavy flooding, but the bridge remained standing with no ill effects. In the light of that, the strength of the arches was finally accepted and Brunel's design was vindicated.

=== Operational life ===
As built and opened on 1 July 1839, the bridge carried a pair of Brunel's 7 ft 1/4 in (2,140 mm) broad gauge railway tracks over the Thames. Over the following decades, traffic to and from London increased enormously. During 1861, work was carried out to install mixed gauge tracks throughout the route between London and Bristol, allowing standard gauge traffic to traverse the structure.

In anticipation of the final conversion of all broad gauge tracks to the standard rail gauge, which occurred during 1890–1892, the bridge was widened on each side to carry four standard gauge tracks. That work was carried out under the supervision of the civil engineer Sir John Fowler, the width overall being increased from 30 feet (9.1 m) to 57 feet 3 inches (17.45 m). The expansion was undertaken sympathetically, resulting in the outward shape of the bridge remaining almost unaltered, but the new elevations and arches were constructed using the redder Cattybrook brick. The pre-existing London stock brick arches were also encased in Cattybrook brick to ensure uniformity of colour, causing the distinctive chamfered step between the original Brunel arch and Fowler's additions. To avoid any differential settlement between the old and new sections, the foundation extensions were close piled and covered with a timber grillage, before being filled with concrete.

During 1950, the western half of the bridge was awarded Grade II* listing and, in April 1985, the eastern half also received the same level of listing. During July 2012, the Maidenhead Railway Bridge was upgraded to Grade I listed status by the Department for Culture, Media and Sport, following consultation with English Heritage.

=== Modifications for Crossrail ===
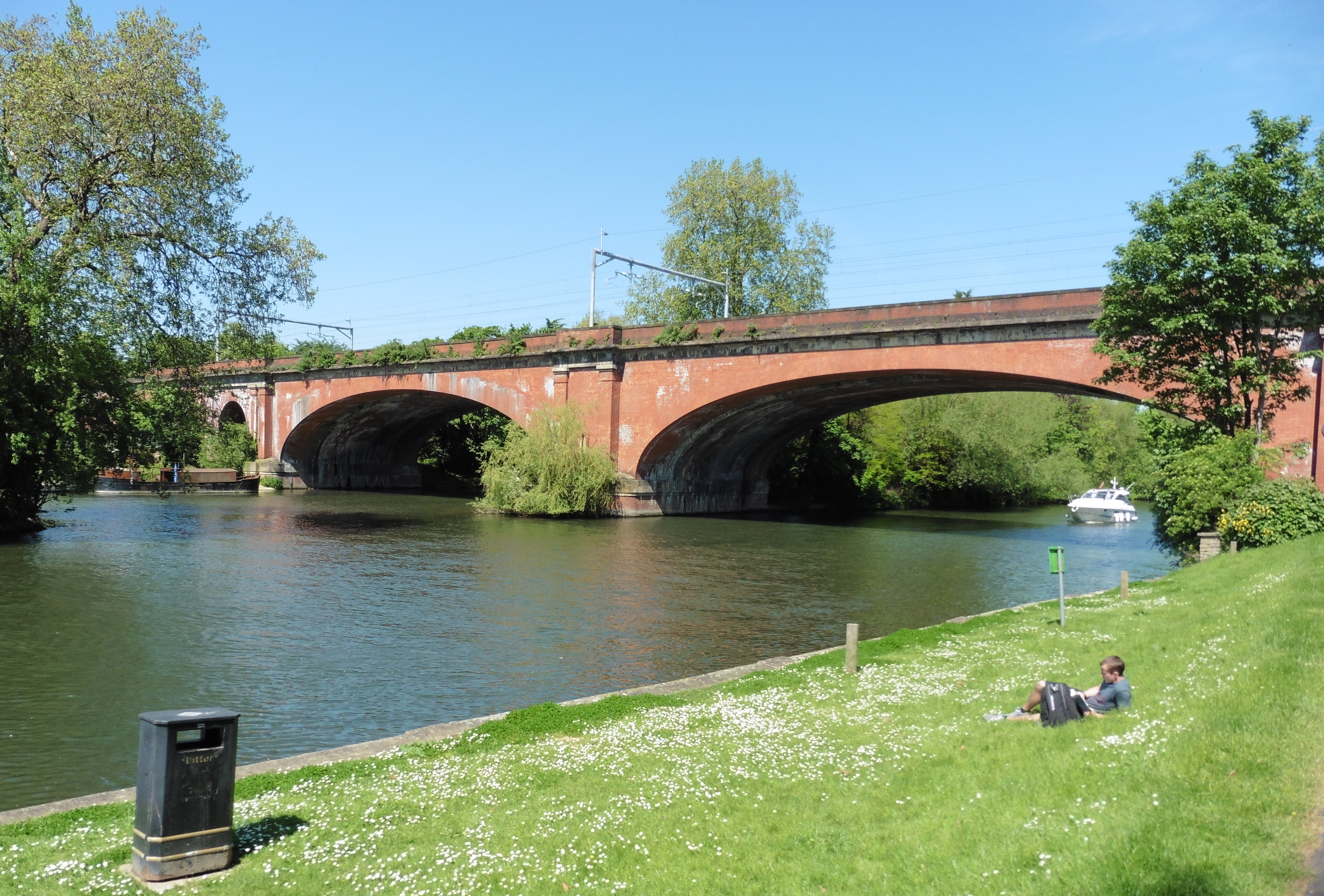
The bridge after electrification gantries were added

The Crossrail development, which created the Elizabeth line, saw the long-delayed overhead electrification of the Great Western line between Paddington and Reading. At one stage, to accommodate construction activity in the area, it had been planned for a temporary construction depot to be created in Guards Club Park, immediately adjacent to the Maidenhead Bridge on the Berkshire side. However, the depot was never established, although the bridge itself still underwent some modification to accommodate the installation of overhead line equipment and associated infrastructure. The latest Crossrail Environmental Statement: states:

"The OHLE (Overhead Line Equipment) requires that supporting posts be founded on the bridge structure. These will be positioned so as not to disrupt the symmetry of the bridge. Three sets of masts will be fixed at the bridge supports and a further two sets will be fixed at the far ends of the bridge. The masts will be fixed such that they may be removed in the future without damaging the bridge as it stands today."

The report also states:

"It is proposed that the OHLE over Maidenhead railway bridge will use masts with wires suspended from cantilevers, since these will be visually lighter structures than the gantries to be used along other parts of the route. The masts will however, have a significant adverse landscape impact: they will affect important views along the river and the character of the river corridor; they will affect the setting of the Riverside Conservation Area; and they will affect the setting of the listed railway bridge and the setting of the adjacent Grade I listed road bridge."

As a means of reducing the visual impact of the electrification infrastructure on the historic bridge area, the possibility of adopting third rail electrification for that section of the line was proposed. However, following a study of that option, the use of a third rail was rejected.

== See also ==
- List of crossings of the River Thames

Next bridge upstream	River Thames	Next bridge downstream
Maidenhead Bridge (road)	Maidenhead Railway Bridge; Grid reference SU901810	M4 Bridge (motorway)
