= Bray Lock =

Lock and weir on the River Thames in Buckinghamshire, England

Coordinates: 51.50893°N 0.69159°W

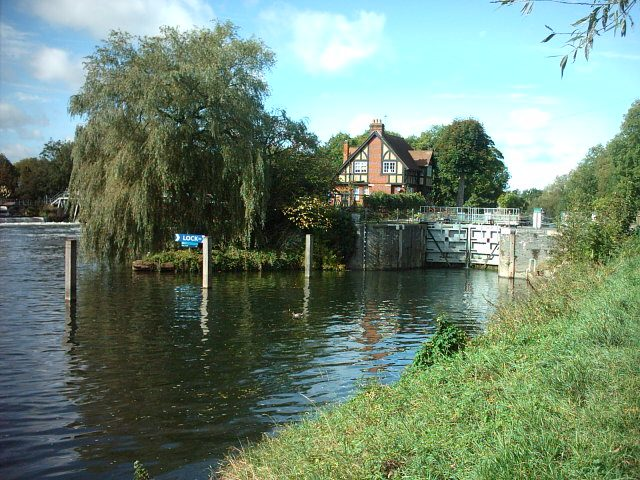
- Bray Lock, Buckinghamshire
- Interactive map of Bray Lock
- Waterway: River Thames
- County: Buckinghamshire
- Maintained by: Environment Agency
- Operation: Hydraulic
- First built: 1845
- Latest built: 1888
- Length: 40.94 m (134 ft 4 in)
- Width: 5.46 m (17 ft 11 in)
- Fall: 1.46 m (4 ft 9 in)
- Above sea level: 69'
- Distance to Teddington Lock: 29 miles

Bray Lock is a lock and weir on the River Thames in England near Bray and Dorney Reach, and is just above the M4 Bridge across the Thames. The lock is on the Buckinghamshire side of the river on the opposite bank from Bray itself and Maidenhead which are in Berkshire. Here, the county line stands roughly halfway between the lock and the opposite bank, following the course of the Thames itself. The pound lock was built by the Thames Navigation Commission relatively late, in 1845. The lock keeper's cottage is on an island (Parting Eyot) between the lock and the weir.

The weir is almost level with the lock and runs straight across to the opposite bank from the other side of the lock island.

== History ==
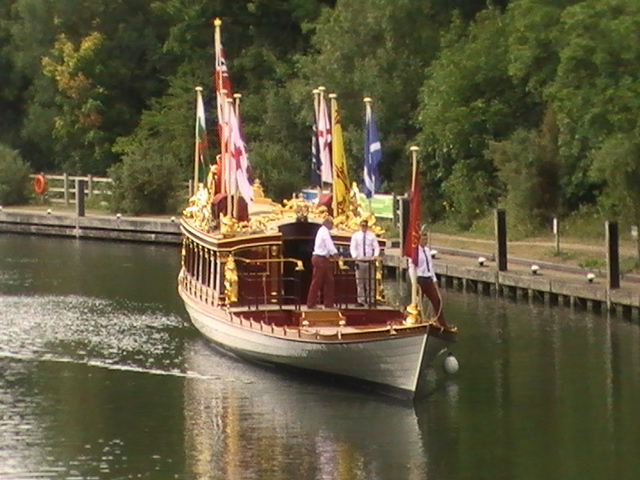
The Gloriana approaching Bray Lock from upstream

There was a mill recorded on the site in the Domesday Book and in 1328 there was a reference to "Richard atte Lock of Bray" occupying a weir called Braibrok. Fifty years later in 1377 there are records of travellers complaining of the excessive tolls at a flash lock on the site called Hameldon Lock. Both the lock and the weirs were removed in 1510 by order of the Commissioner of Sewers.

In 1622 a new flash lock was built by Thomas Manfield and presence of water pens is noted in 1632. Navigation may in earlier times have used York Stream which went on the other side of Bray to Maidenhead. A pound lock and weir were first proposed in 1833 for the "improvement of navigation two or three miles above". The fall between Maidenhead and Boveney was large, leading to shallows and a strong current. The towpath was on the Buckinghamshire bank, and navigation on the Berkshire side, so tow ropes had to pass across the island. The suggestion of a lock was made again in 1843 and a lock house built on Parting Eyot with an open-sided lock the following year. The miller contributed to the cost of the weir. The lock was often left open except when river levels were low and no tolls were collected. Sides were added before 1877 and the lock and weir were rebuilt in 1885. Prior to the rebuilding Charles Dickens had described Bray Lock as a "rotten and dangerous structure".

== Incidents ==
On 2 August 2015, a privately owned cabin cruiser carrying four adults and four children suffered a catastrophic explosion of its propane canisters, caused by the ignition of fuel that had accidentally been poured down a waste pipe. Six of the eight people involved, including a three-year-old boy, were rushed to St. George's Hospital in London and John Radcliffe Hospital in Oxfordshire by Air Ambulance for treatment. Another man suffered minor injuries, but was treated at the scene. Members of the public, including the Lock keeper, assisted in the efforts, evacuating the injured from the destroyed boat onto a hire craft for triage.

== Reach above the lock ==
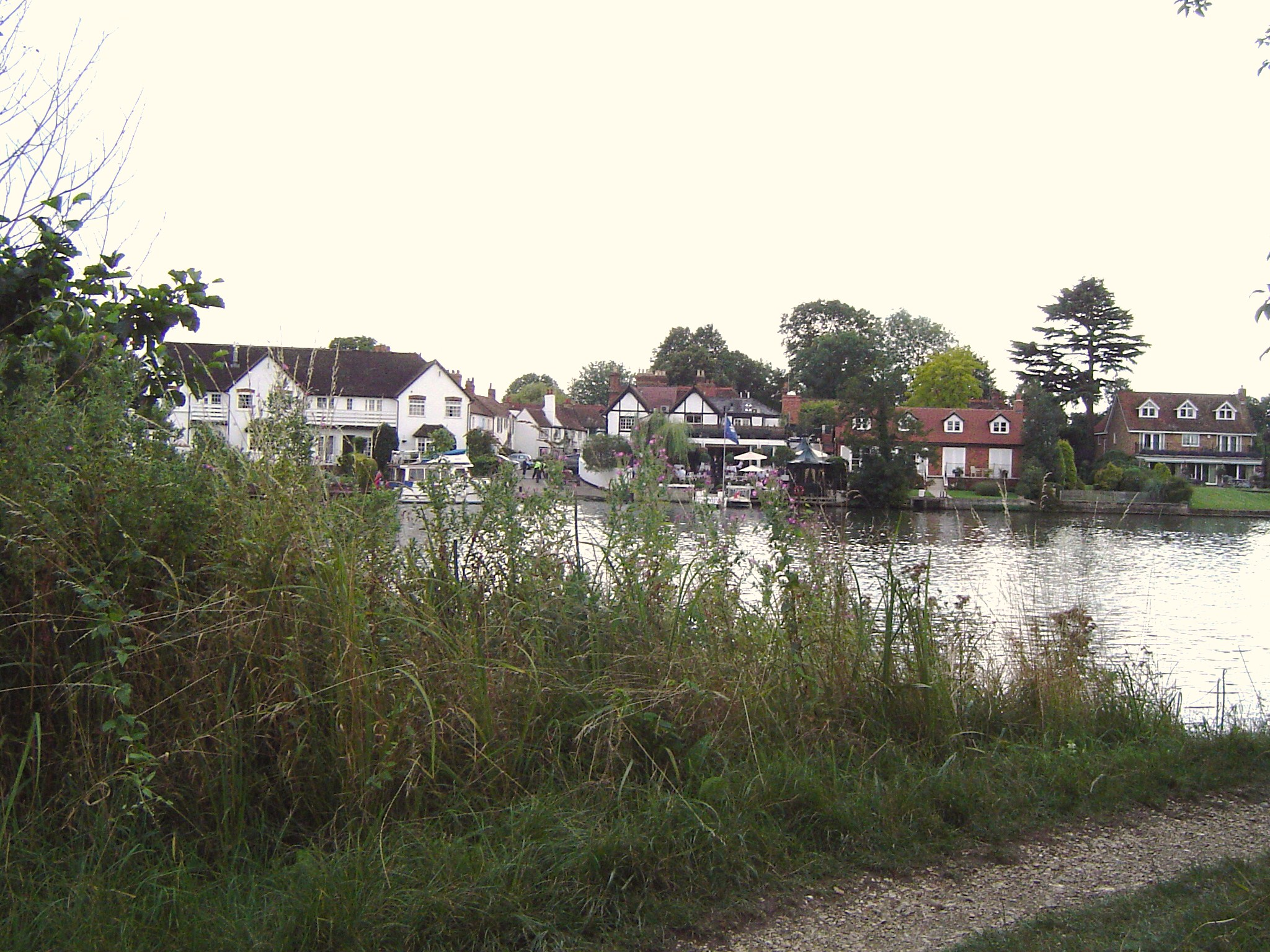
Bray from the River Thames

Immediately above the lock is Headpile Eyot. Bray is on the Berkshire bank while the Buckinghamshire bank has open fields. Further along the reach is Brunel's Maidenhead Railway Bridge, known as the "Sounding Bridge" from the echo underneath it. The Maidenhead bank is lined with large Edwardian houses up to Maidenhead Bridge beside which is the Skindles Hotel once a rendez-vous for illicit coupling.

Above the bridge are the islands of Bridge Eyot and Grass Eyot before Boulter's Lock with Taplow on the Buckinghamshire side.

Maidenhead Regatta takes place below the railway bridge in August, and is followed by the annual Thames Punting Championships. The Maidenhead Junior regatta is held in May.

=== Sports clubs ===
- Maidenhead Rowing Club

=== Thames Path ===
The Thames Path follows the Bucks (Eastern) bank to Maidenhead Bridge, which it crosses, and then proceeds on the Berkshire side to Boulter's Lock.

== See also ==
- Locks on the River Thames
- Rowing on the River Thames

Next lock upstream	River Thames	Next lock downstream
Boulter's Lock; 3.43 km (2.13 mi)	Bray Lock; Grid reference: SU909797	Boveney Lock; 5.10 km (3.17 mi)
