= Maidenhead Waterways =

System of canals in Maidenhead, England

Coordinates: 51.5180°N 0.7123°W

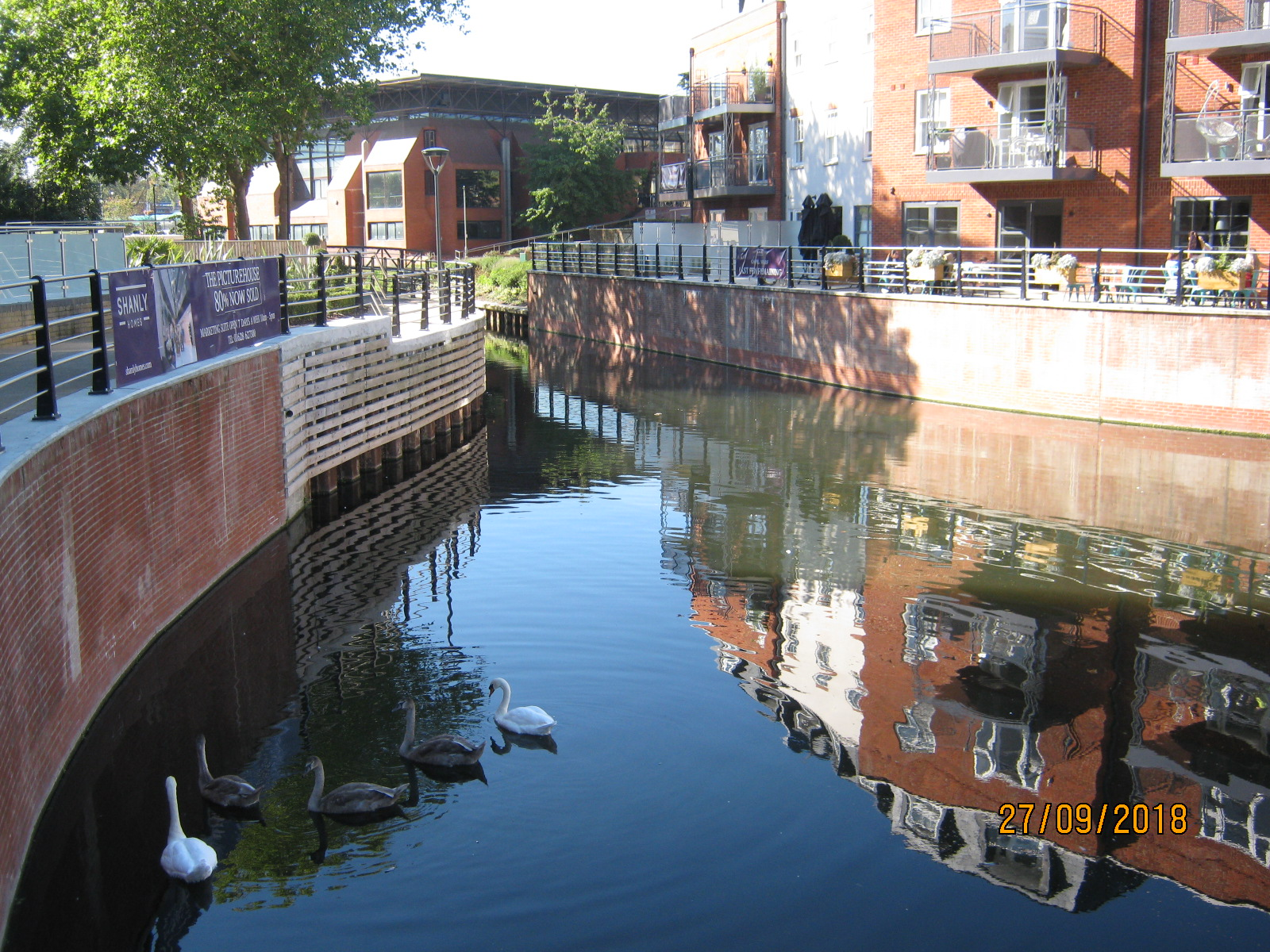
A view of a restored portion of the York Stream, viewed from the Chapel Arches. High Street Maidenhead

The Maidenhead Waterways are a system of canals in Maidenhead, England. Formerly disused, plans to restore and upgrade them were announced in 2011. The works would initially make the waterways navigable by small craft, and over time by larger craft, as limitations to navigation are gradually removed.

Running south from the Thames near Cliveden, the channel divides into York Stream - passing under the historic Chapel Arches - and Moor Cut which crosses Town Moor. The channels re-join at Green Lane where they become Bray Cut, before returning to the Thames by Bray Marina. As a side channel of the Thames, the waterway has a perpetual right of public navigation, which cannot be extinguished by lack of use.

== History ==
The flood plain between Cookham and Windsor has the remains of many old waterways, serving over time as boundaries, drainage channels, mill leats and in parts, for navigation.

The waterways that still run through Maidenhead town centre were in the past much larger than today, as the scale of the older structures over the channels demonstrates. In Regency times, the main waterway was known as The Canal. Brunel constructed two separate sets of substantial tunnels (eight in all) to safely carry the water under his GWR railway in c1838. The 1899 OS map shows Chapel Arches having water in three substantial arches, above a large lake at Ives Place where the present library is situated.

Long before today's pound locks were built on the main River Thames, the old waterways were controlled by flash locks, consisting of sluices or weirs with removable sections. Barges are believed to have once operated from wharves on both the main river and its side channels. Parts of the waterway are thought to have been in active use up to at least the 1920s, witness statements recalling having seen reeds being cut for thatching and also timber being unloaded from a barge at Willow Wharf in the Moor Cut channel on Town Moor. Kelly's Directory for Berkshire 1939 lists a builders merchants "Grace C.W.& Co operating from Willow Wharf in Bridge Street" and the signs for Graces can still be seen on the channel wall by the Police station at Town Moor.

The channel which crosses Town Moor was enlarged in the 1960s as part of the then flood defence system, some time before the Jubilee River was completed in 2002, providing flood relief to Maidenhead and making the previous flood defence system redundant. The two channels re-join at Green Lane and from there the waterway running down to the Thames is already 45 to 50 feet (14 to 15 m) wide, but overgrown and partly silted up. Channel clearance work over the last few years by volunteers has removed most of the tree blockages and it is now usable (albeit still with some challenges) by canoes and rowing boats.

In recent years the York Stream channel in the centre of Maidenhead had become narrow, shallow and prone to dry out at times of low flow on the main River Thames that feeds it. Under its previous flood protection role, the adjoining Moor Cut channel was kept permanently dry except in flood conditions.

== Restoration ==
By October 2008, a long-term renewal scheme was in progress, aiming to restore and upgrade the old waterways and allow boats into the centre of Maidenhead. The Maidenhead Waterways Group (MW) had been founded in 2006, and became a charity and private company limited by guarantee in March 2007, with the aim of restoring the waterways to a navigable standard, allowing boats to travel into and around the town centre 'Ring'. A lock and weir at Green Lane was to raise and stabilize water levels in the town centre channels and permanently fill the dry Moor Cut channel of the waterway.

The Royal Borough of Windsor and Maidenhead set up the Partnership for the Rejuvenation of Maidenhead (PRoM) in December 2007, which developed and proposed a 20 Year Vision and Action Plan for rejuvenating the town centre. The comprehensive Area Action Plan was adopted in September 2011, after successive consultations. It saw the restored waterway as one of the defining projects which would help to improve and shape the identity of the town for the future. It also identified opportunity areas, where major developments based around housing and offices could take place. Three of these abutted the waterways, and would be enhanced by having a pleasant water outlook. These were the High Street and York Stream area just to the south of the A4 bridge, the York Road area on the north side of the railway, and the Stafferton Way area on the south side of the railway. Such developments often contribute to the provision of community infrastructure through planning gain, which is negotiated under section 106 of the Town and Country Planning Act 1990, and is thus known as Section 106 money. The first of these became known as the Chapel Arches scheme, for which the developer was Shanly Homes. They built three developments, Waterside Quarter, The Picturehouse and Chapel Wharf, providing 259 homes and 30,000 square feet (2,800 m^{2}) of commercial property. The York Road development was managed as a joint venture between the Royal Borough and Countryside Partnerships South, who were awarded a contract in April 2017. Countryside specializes in place making and urban regeneration. This project included 229 homes, of which 68 were affordable properties, 20,000 square feet (1,900 m^{2}) of commercial property for restaurants and cafes, and a new building to house the Maidenhead Heritage Centre.

A planning application for Phase 1 of the waterways works was submitted to the Royal Borough by Maidenhead Waterways in August 2011 and consent was granted in December 2012 subject to certain conditions. These included the production of detailed plans outlining how the waterways would be managed and maintained, and a requirement that the project was completed within five years from the date at which work started. It was expected that funding would come from private donations, public grants, lottery funding and Section 106 contributions from developers. The project then moved on to the detailed design stage, in parallel with investigation of funding options. By 2014, the project had been split into three stages, with the middle stage further sub-divided into three parts. These were Stage 1, from the A4 bridge to the Great Western Railway arches, Stage 2A, from the A4 bridge to the point at which the York Stream and Moor Cut diverge, Stage 2B, from the railway arches to Green Lane, where the York Stream and Moor Cut rejoin, Stage 2C, the construction of the weir to raise water levels, and Stage 3, the construction of a lock and the work on the Moor Cut.

The Council then looked for a contractor, and a contract was awarded to specialist water and environmental contractor Greenford Ltd in November 2014. They had tendered for stages 1, 2A and 2B, and the initial contract was for £2.63 million, covering Stage 1, as there was no funding in place at the time for the other phases. Work on this first stage of the build began in early 2015, with the flow of the York Stream being diverted by a temporary dam down the usually empty Moor Cut channel in February. This allowed the York Stream to dry out, so that work could begin, but this was delayed, as the Shanly Group were working on the adjacent Chapel Arches development, and needed to pump groundwater into the channel while they constructed basements. No external funding from Government, European or Lottery sources was forthcoming, so the works were initially funded by money from the Thames Valley Local Enterprise Partnership’s Growing Places loan fund, and then by Section 106 money resulting from developments in the town centre.

In December 2015 the Royal Borough of Windsor and Maidenhead announced its intention to provide £3 million to fund the next stage of the build, allowing the 0.6-mile (1 km) long York Stream arm of Maidenhead's waterway 'Ring' to be completed, including the construction of a weir with a fish pass and boat rollers at the southern end, to raise the surface water level throughout the town centre. Shanly Homes contributed to the cost of the waterway build and also built an informal 200 seat waterside amphitheatre for public use next to the Library and a new footbridge over the channel. Phase 1, including the weir, fish pass and landscaping was completed in March 2020, enabling small boats to use the York Stream half of the ring. Shanly Homes had completed the Picturehouse and Chapel Wharf phases of the development at Chapel Arches, set around a large water basin on the waterway. The third phase of their development, Waterside Quarter, was expected to be completed in 2021 together with the final linking section of the York Stream arm of the waterway ’Ring’. An access ramp and pontoons at Chapel Arches will provide a boat loading facility and storage for canoes and small boats in the two western (closed) arches, to assist with maintenance of the waterway.

A short video introduced by Theresa May was produced in 2018. In 2019, the project won a special recognition award in the national Canal and River Trust's Living Waterways 2019 competition. This trust also made a video about the project.

The first section to be completed was formally opened by Theresa May on 14 March 2020. A weir has been constructed at Green Lane, initially with boat rollers rather than a lock, where small boats can be launched. The weir raises the water depth to 4.25 feet (1.30 m), and the western channel, the York Cut, is navigable as far as Chapel Arches bridge. The total cost to this point was £8 million, which has been provided by Windor and Maidenhead Council and section 106 money from the two developers, Shanly and Countryside, who have building projects along the banks of the waterways. Moor Cut remains quite shallow, except near its southern end where it joins York Stream, but its bed will be lowered as part of the Stage 3 work.

In due course, Maidenhead Waterways will be seeking funding to improve the southern channel, Bray Cut, which already links the ‘Ring’ to the River Thames at Bray Marina. This channel was enlarged in the 1960s as part of the town's flood defences, but has silted up since and is very overgrown.

== Route ==
The route of the complete waterway starts at the Thames near Cliveden Reach, running via the White Brook (Widbrook) across Cookham Moor (fed by a small stream known as Fleet Ditch), to the junction with Strand Water. It then runs southwards via Maidenhead Ditch until it splits at Town Moor into York Stream and Moor Cut. York Stream passes to the west through Maidenhead town centre. The previous flood role of the Moor Cut channel to the east, which is usually dry, was overtaken by the Jubilee River scheme. The two sections re-join at Green Lane where they become a channel known as The Cut (or Bray Cut to differentiate this section from the main section of The Cut, Berkshire which flows into the River Thames at Bray Marina).

The footpath that follows the existing N-S (York Stream) waterside corridor is known as "The Green Way". As part of the consented scheme, a second footpath is to be provided along the length of the hidden Moor Cut channel, to complete a waterside path around the completed ‘Ring’.

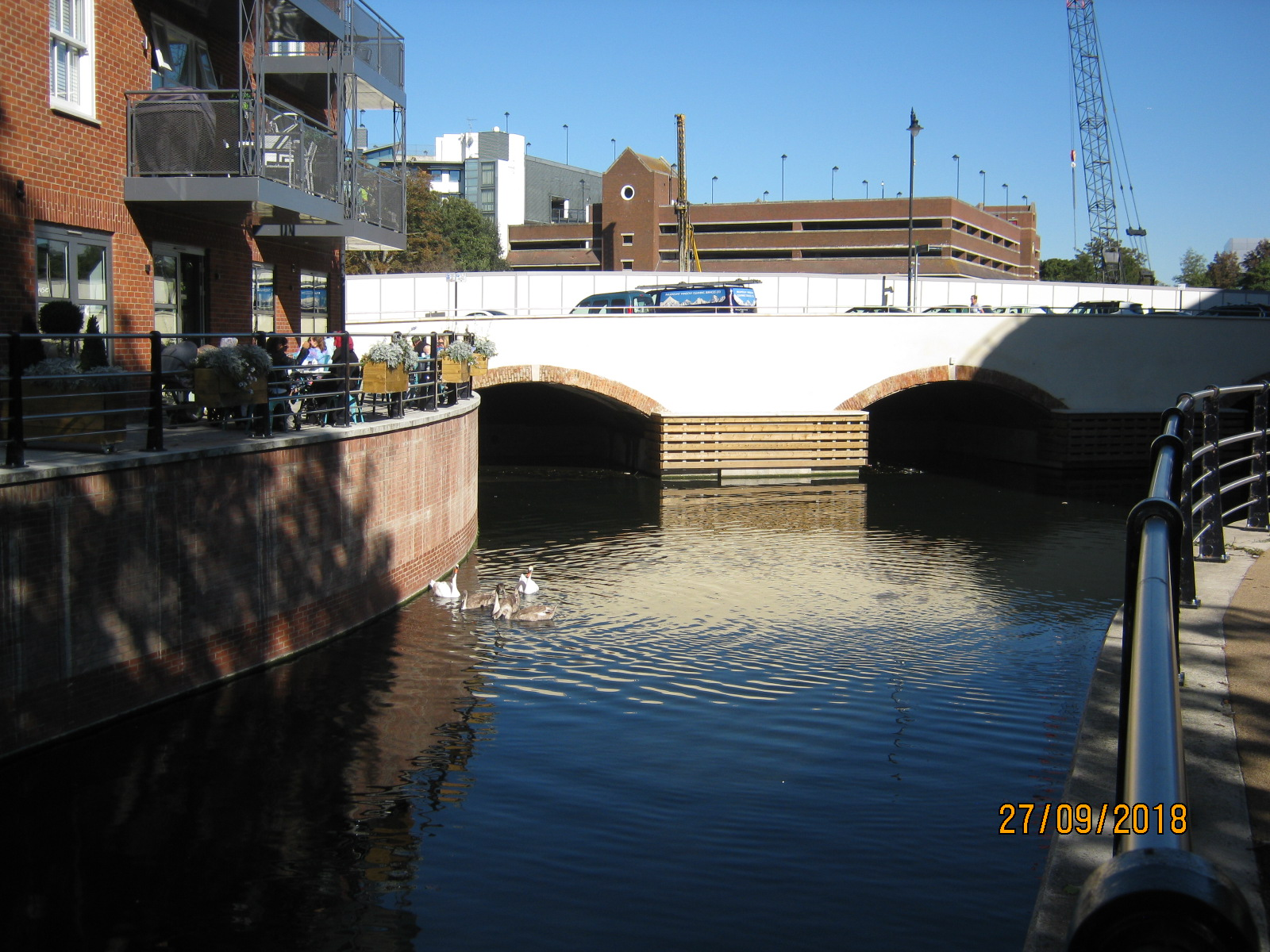
A view of Chapel Arches looking North.

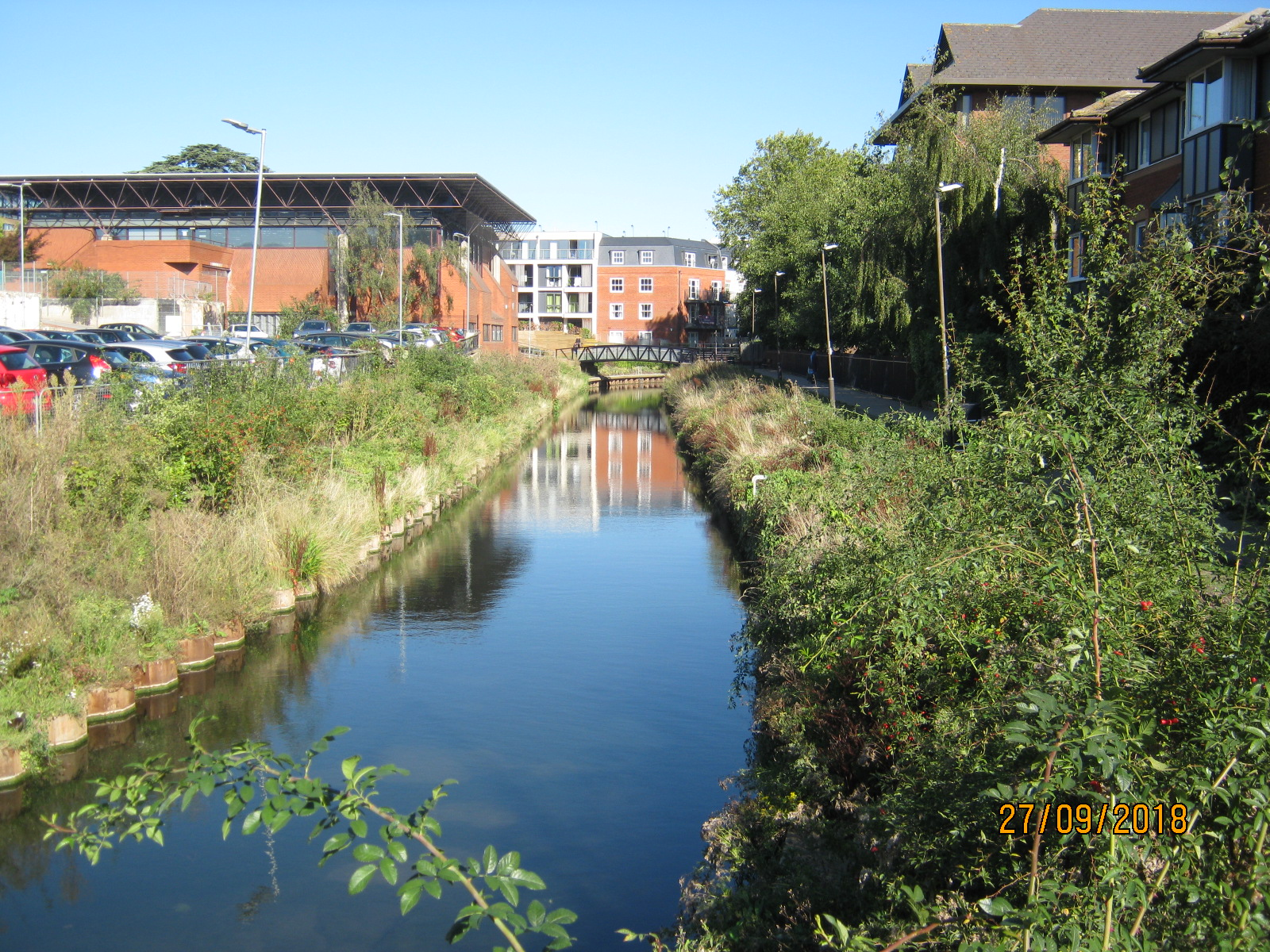
York Road Channel

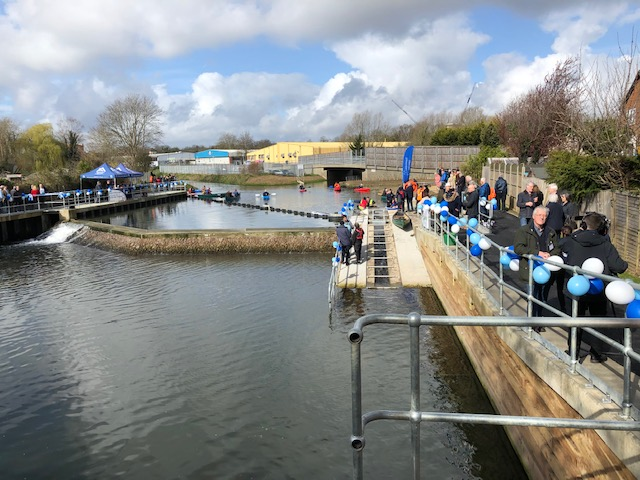
Confluence of Moor Cut and York Stream with weir near Green Lane.

== Water quality ==
The Environment Agency measure the water quality of the river systems in England. Each is given an overall ecological status, which may be one of five levels: high, good, moderate, poor and bad. There are several components that are used to determine this, including biological status, which looks at the quantity and varieties of invertebrates, angiosperms and fish. Chemical status, which compares the concentrations of various chemicals against known safe concentrations, is rated good or fail.

The water quality of the Maidenhead Waterways system was as follows in 2019. The reasons for the quality being less than good included the discharge of sewage into the waterways and physical modification of the channel, which present barriers to the movement of fish. The chemical status of the waterways has improved, from Fail in 2013 and 2014 to Good in 2015 and 2016. Between 2016 and 2019 it deteriorated to Fail. The Environment Agency classify the section above Green Lane as Maidenhead Ditch, while the lower section is grouped with the lower reaches of The Cut.

Section	Ecological Status	Chemical Status	Overall Status	Length	Catchment	Channel
Maidenhead Ditch	Moderate	Fail	Moderate	4.3 miles (6.9 km)	8.71 square miles (22.6 km^{2})	heavily modified
Cut (Binfield to River Thames) and Maidenhead Ditch	Moderate	Fail	Moderate	10.7 miles (17.2 km)	25.91 square miles (67.1 km^{2})	

== See also ==
- Canals of the United Kingdom
- History of the British canal system
- Tributaries of the River Thames

Next confluence upstream	River Thames	Next confluence downstream
River Wye (north)	Maidenhead Waterways	Clewer Mill Stream (south)
