= Windsor Racecourse =

Horse racing venue in England

Coordinates: 51°29′25.71″N 0°37′52.79″W

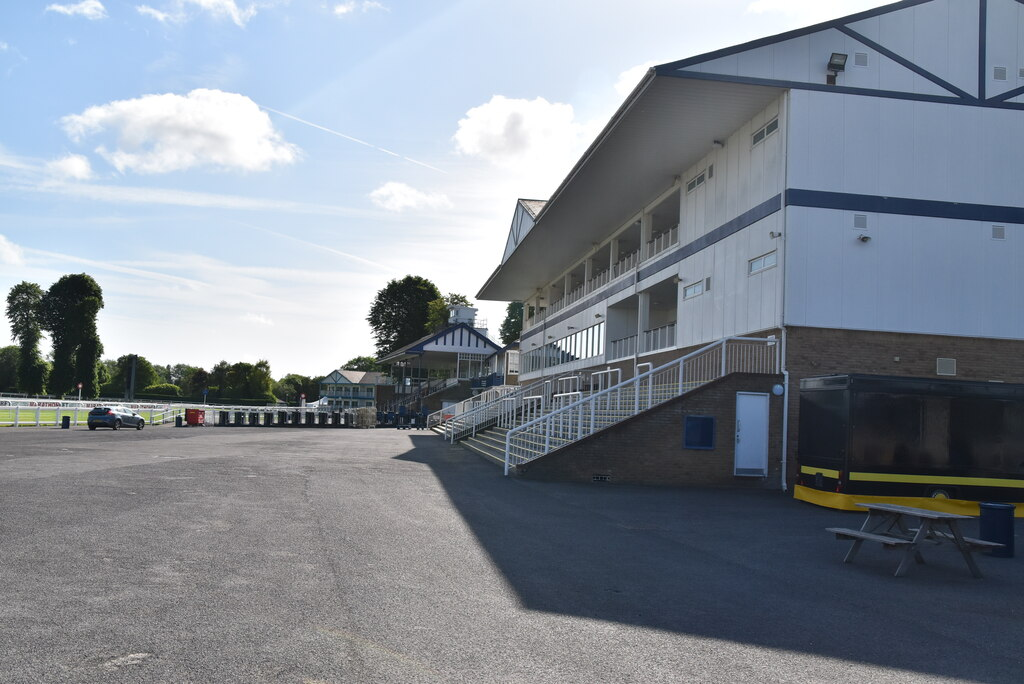
- The betting ring and stands
- Interactive map of Windsor Racecourse
- Location: Windsor, Berkshire
- Owned by: Arena Leisure PLC
- Date opened: 1866
- Screened on: Sky Sports Racing
- Course type: Flat & National Hunt
- Notable races: Winter Hill Stakes

Windsor Racecourse, also known as Royal Windsor Racecourse, is a thoroughbred horse racing venue located in Windsor, Berkshire, England. It is near the M3 and the M4 and the town has two railway stations. It is one of only two figure-of-eight courses in the United Kingdom, the other being at Fontwell Park.

== Description ==
Windsor Racecourse is located on the banks of the River Thames and occupies a large island between the main channel of the River and the Clewer Mill Stream backwater.

Although the course is shaped like a figure-of-eight, the full circuit is never used, so in races of 1m, 1m 2f and 1m 3f 99y (the longest distance at Windsor) the runners turn only right-handed. The full circuit is a little over 1m 4f, although it was about 1m 6f until the late 1970s. The 6f course is almost straight.

== History ==
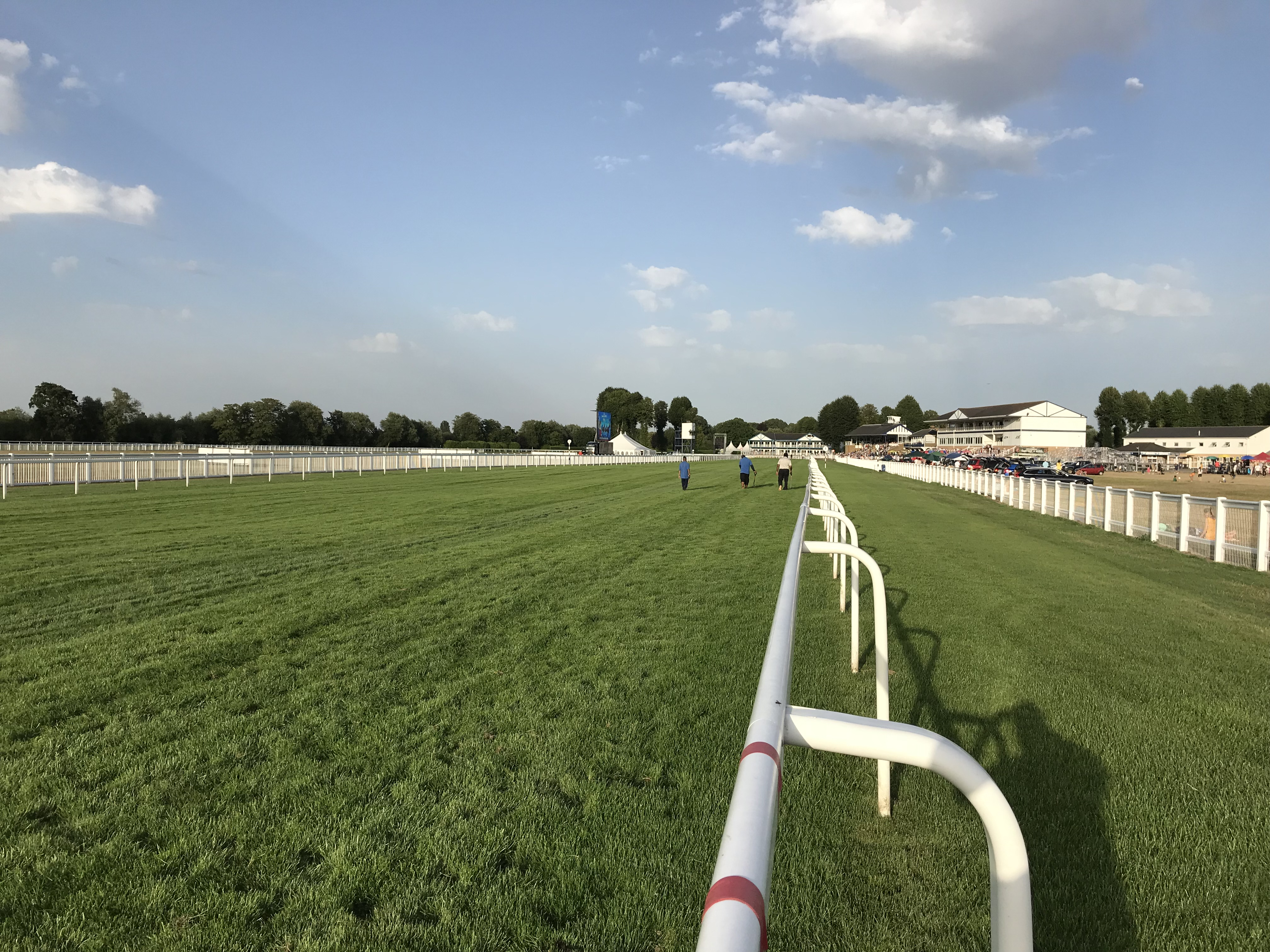
The home straight

The local area has links to horse racing that date back to the time of Henry VIII, whose Privy Purse Accounts contain records of payments to Thomas Ogle, Master of Horse at Windsor, where there was a stud and stable inside the Castle grounds, and Signor Pollo, a trainer, charged the king 7s 2d for a horse bath there. By the time of Charles II there were race meetings at Datchet Ferry, where a bet of 500 guineas was made on a race in 1682.

In 1865, Mr John Frail drew up plans for a racecourse on Rays Meadows, and the following year on 5th and 6th June, the first meeting was held. One of the spectators was Admiral Rous, who devised racing's weight-for-age scale, which (with some changes) is still used today.

In 1926, the bookmakers at Windsor were so angry at the betting tax introduced by Stanley Baldwin's Chancellor of the Exchequer, Winston Churchill, that they refused to trade. The crowd watched the racing in silence. The tax was soon abolished.

In 1944, a German V1 flying bomb landed in a field near the racecourse just as the runners for a race were about to leave the parade ring. Local servicemen attended meetings with radar but failed to detect the danger on this occasion. Racegoers appeared to be unruffled. Windsor was one of three southern courses allowed to stage racing during the Second World War (the others being Newmarket and Salisbury).

In 1947, the course, bounded by the Thames and a mill stream, was flooded three feet deep in the stands, causing £100,000 worth of damage.

Winston Churchill attended Windsor races in 1949 to watch his Colonist II win the Lime Tree Stakes.

In 1987 David Thompson acquired a majority interest in Windsor Racecourse and Richard Thompson became chairman from 1987 until the sale to Arena Leisure plc in 1999.

Windsor abandoned National Hunt jump racing in December 1998, switching entirely to Flat racing. However, the course occasionally held National Hunt meetings since, such as when it took over some of nearby Ascot's jump meetings during its refurbishment in the mid-2000s. In July 2023 Arena Racing Company announced a plan for jump racing to return to the course from the 2024–25 season. National Hunt racing resumed at the course on 15 December 2024.

On 15 October 2012 jockey Richard Hughes won 7 races out of the 8 races on the day.

== Notable races ==
Month	Day	Race	Type	Grade	Distance	Age/sex
August	Saturday	August Stakes	Flat	Listed	1m 3f 99y	4yo +
September	Monday	Winter Hill Stakes	Flat	Group 3	1m 2f 7y	3yo

== Other events ==
Windsor Racecourse was the location for scenes in the film Last Orders.

Windsor Racecourse was also the location for the filming of Midsomer Murders Season 8 episode Bantling Boy.

For the 2012 Summer Olympics a temporary bridge linked the Racecourse with Dorney Lake, the rowing and canoeing venue. The Racecourse served as a pick-up and drop-off point for spectators travelling to and from Dorney Lake.
