= Black Potts Ait =

Island in the River Thames, England

Coordinates: 51.493°N 0.597°W

Map showing the location of Black Potts Ait within Berkshire.

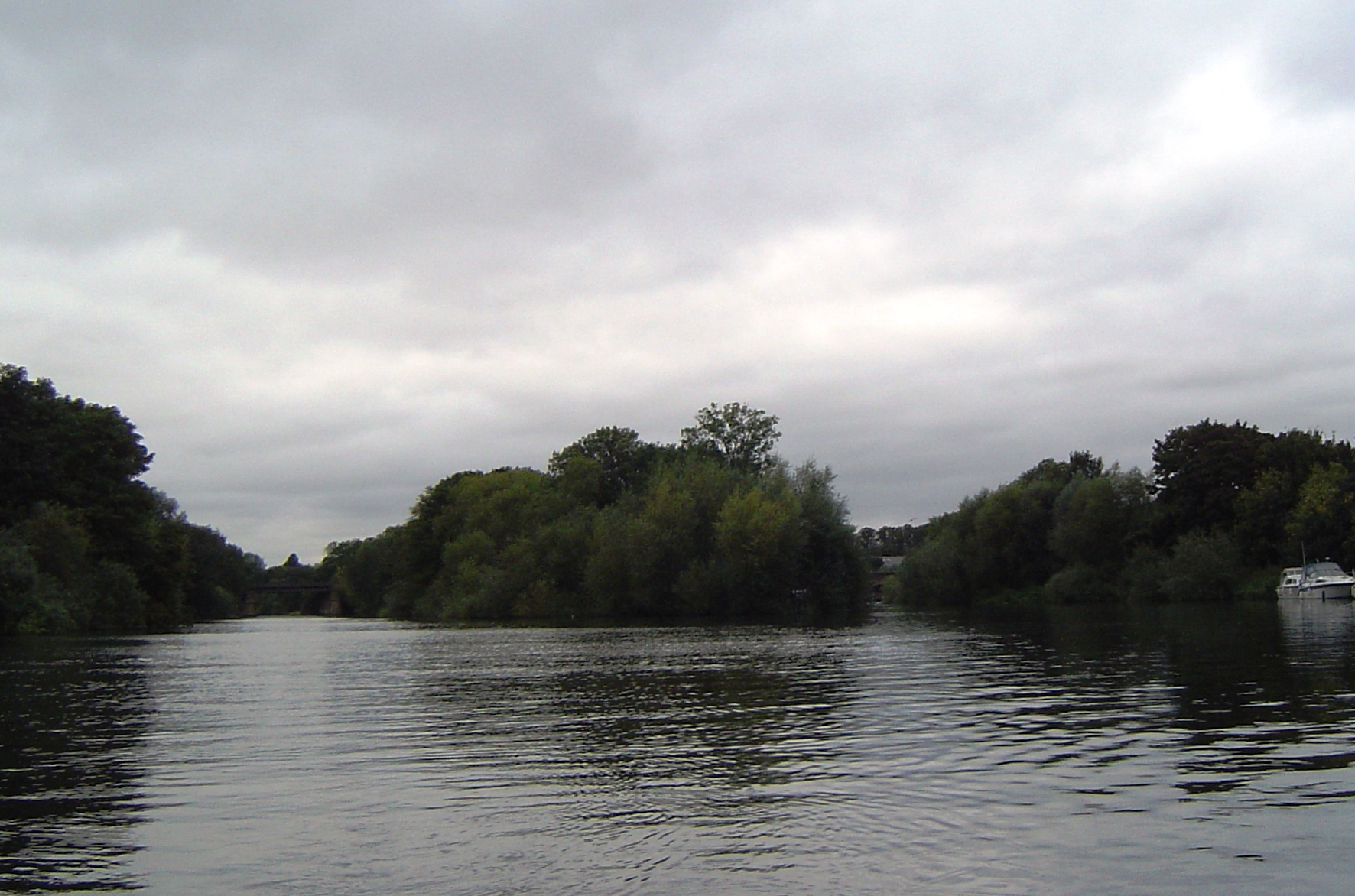
Black Potts Ait from downstream

Black Potts Ait is an island in the River Thames in England near Windsor, Berkshire. It is on the reach between Old Windsor Lock and Romney Lock and carries Black Potts Railway Bridge

The island is a tree-covered triangle which is now at the mouth of the Jubilee River. It was a favourite area for fishing for Charles II, Henry Wotton and John Hales.

== See also ==
- Islands in the River Thames

Next island upstream	River Thames	Next island downstream
Romney Island	Black Potts Ait	Sumptermead Ait
