= Old Windsor Lock =

Lock on the River Thames in Berkshire, England

Coordinates: 51°27′48″N 0°34′9″W

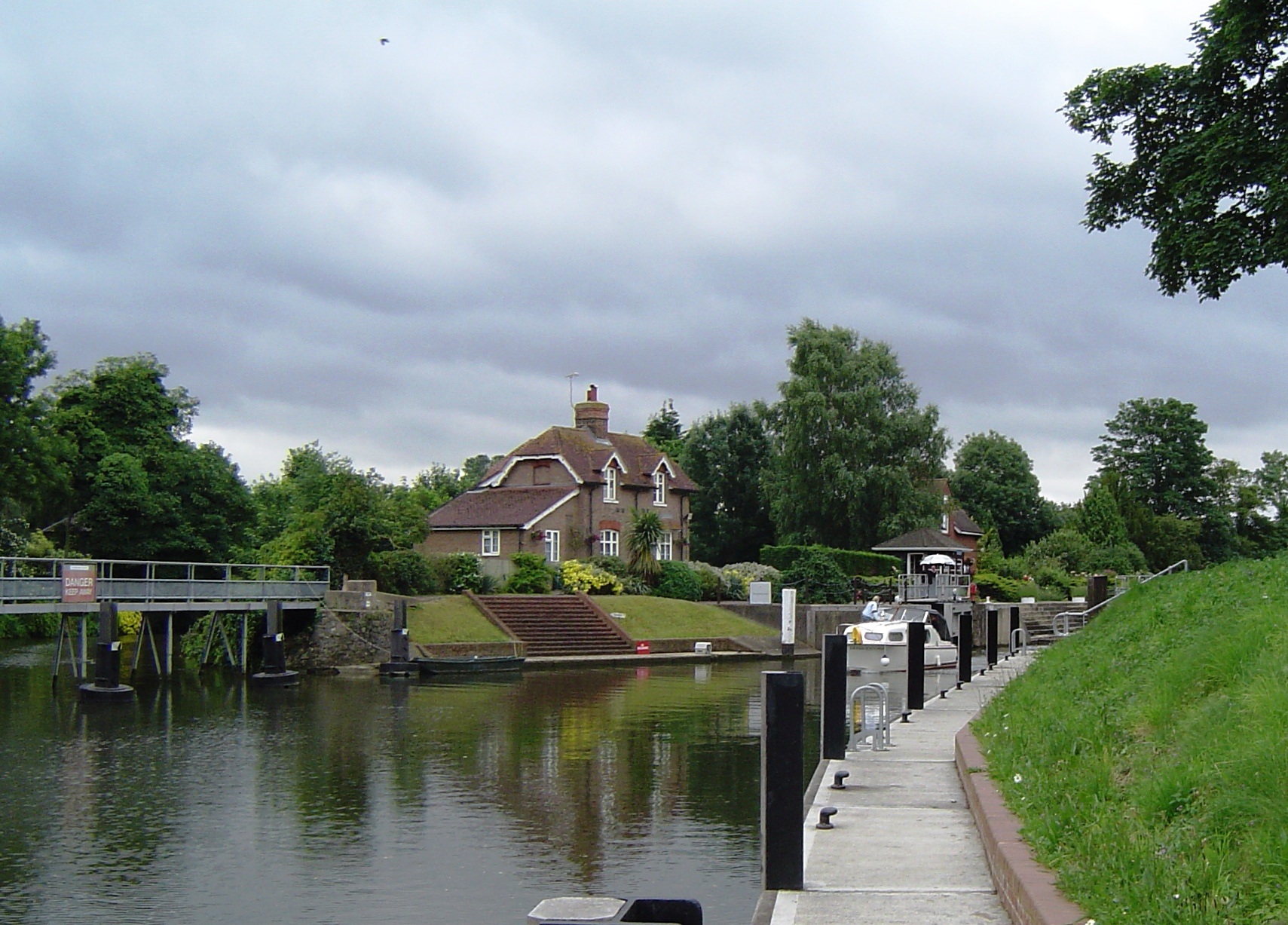
- Old Windsor Lock from the upstream side
- Interactive map of Old Windsor Lock
- Waterway: River Thames
- County: Berkshire
- Maintained by: Environment Agency
- Operation: Hydraulic
- First built: 1822
- Latest built: 1954
- Length: 54.55 m (179 ft 0 in)
- Width: 7.36 m (24 ft 2 in)
- Fall: 1.74 m (5 ft 9 in)
- Above sea level: 53
- Distance to Teddington Lock: 20 miles
- Power is available out of hours

Old Windsor Lock is a lock on the River Thames in England on the right bank beside Old Windsor, Berkshire. The lock marks the downstream end of the New Cut, a meander cutoff built in 1822 by the Thames Navigation Commissioners which created Ham Island. The lock and a wider footbridge give access to the island. Two weirs are associated; the smaller adjoins and the larger is upstream. The lock is the ninth lowest of the forty-five on the river.

== History ==
The old name for the site of the lock was "Top of Caps" and the first suggestion for a lock at "Capps" was in 1770.

In 1822 the lock cut and lock were built by the Thames Navigation Commissioners, considerably shortening the navigation and towpath. Instead of a weir, a less formal obstruction, eel bucks, "Newman's Bucks", retained water around two islets above the cut. The islets measured in the 1890s 0.59 acres (0.24 ha) and 1.4 1.4 acres (0.57 ha). The smaller, downstream one, is Lion Island. The first lock keeper was dismissed after demeanors which included digging through the bank of the lock cut and thereby causing the collapse of the new lock cut bridge. The weir was constructed in 1836. In 1868 there was discussion of removing the lock, but instead it was extended with a tumbling bay added. In 1871 the lock cut bridge was rebuilt with the right reserved to lay sewage pipes across it. The island has the sanitation works for Windsor. The lock was rebuilt in 1957.

== Access ==
The Thames Path for walkers and cyclists links to Ham Lane. A footpath also runs from a long spur road leading to The Manor and The Priory.

== Reach above the lock ==
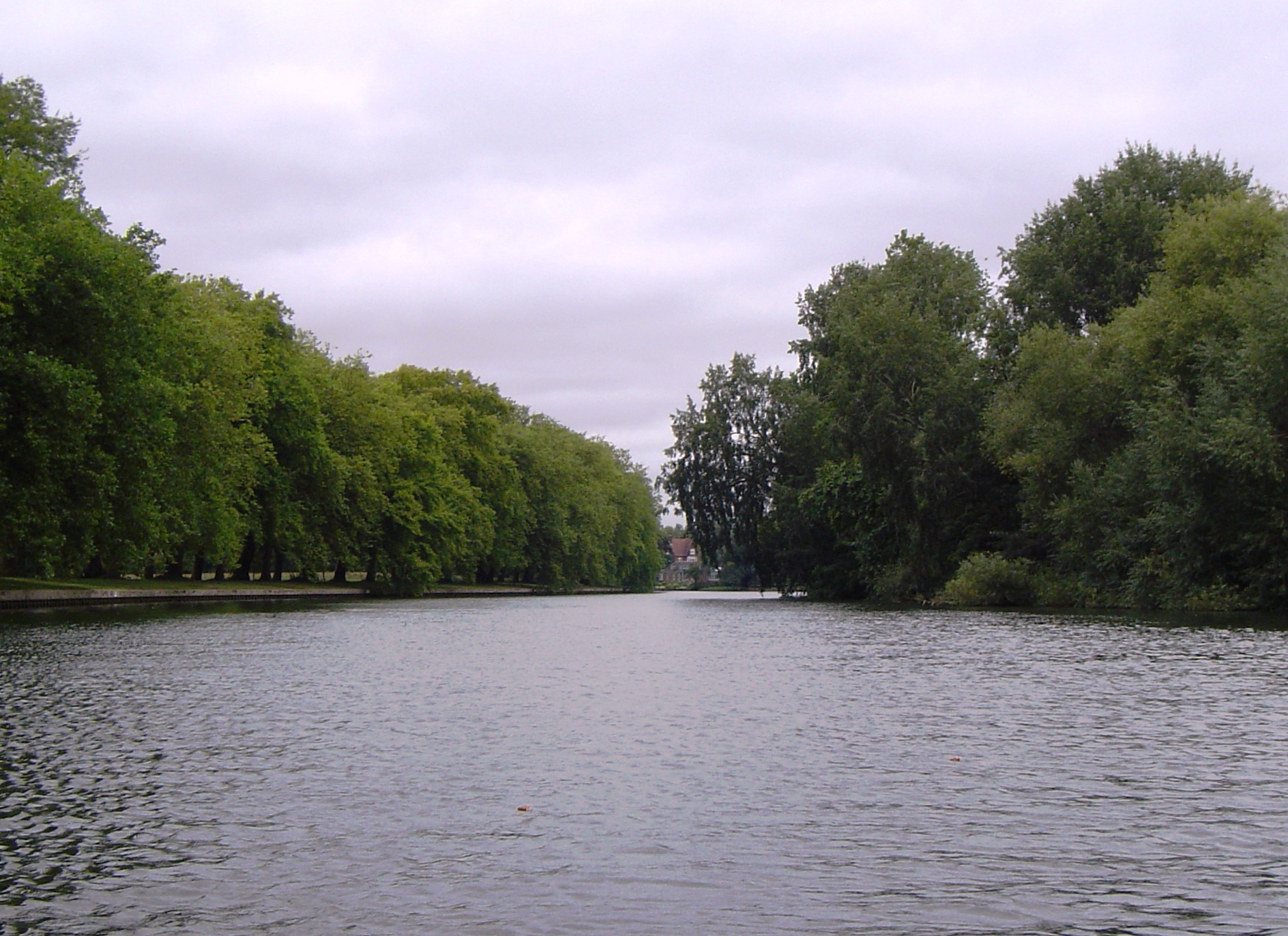
River Thames at Datchet

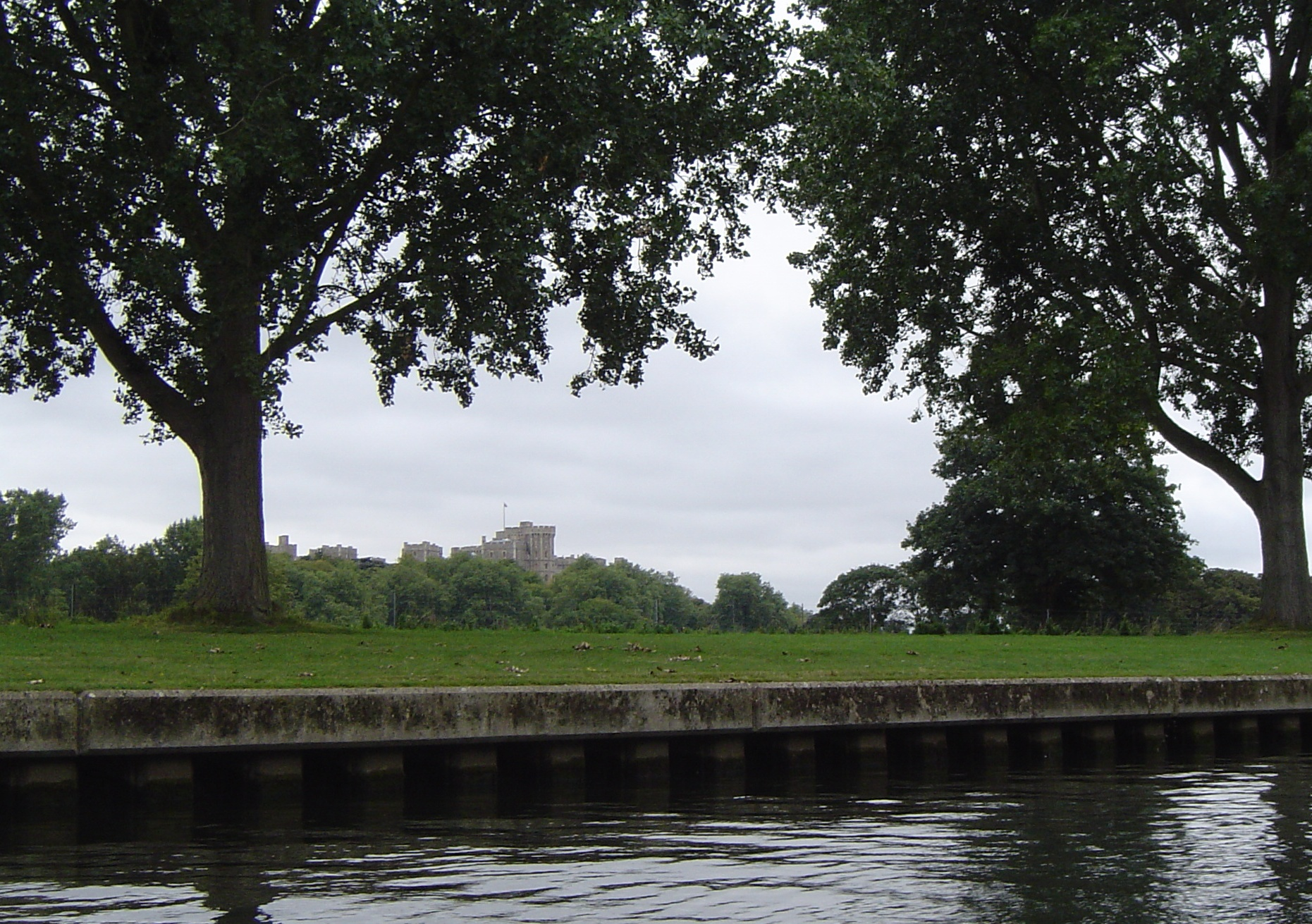
Windsor Castle from the river

The 0.5-mile (0.80 km) cut, is crossed by Ham Bridge from the rest of Old Windsor to Ham Island. Much smaller Lion Island is at the top where the flows split. Then Albert Bridge crosses to Datchet including at its lowest point, the thin island of Sumptermead Ait. On the Windsor side (right bank), the river winds round farmland at Princes Consort farm and Windsor Castle Home Park. There follows Victoria Bridge connecting the upper end of Datchet then a golf course, followed by Black Potts Railway Bridge. The railway bridge has a great brick pier in Black Potts Ait, behind which the Jubilee River rejoins the Thames. The left bank becomes playing fields of Eton College. The area known as Black Potts up to Romney Island is an attraction where those fishing have included Isaak Walton who wrote a major work which promoted angling and Charles II in the century before.

=== Thames Path ===
The Thames Path changes sides upstream at the Albert Bridge, into Datchet including Sumptermead, and returns via Victoria Bridge to the right bank.
A short stretch of river running past Datchet opposite Home Park, Windsor has no towpath access; this is because the original towpath followed the Windsor bank, but a section was removed by the Windsor Castle Act 1848 which created Home Park and Victoria and Albert Bridges.

== See also ==
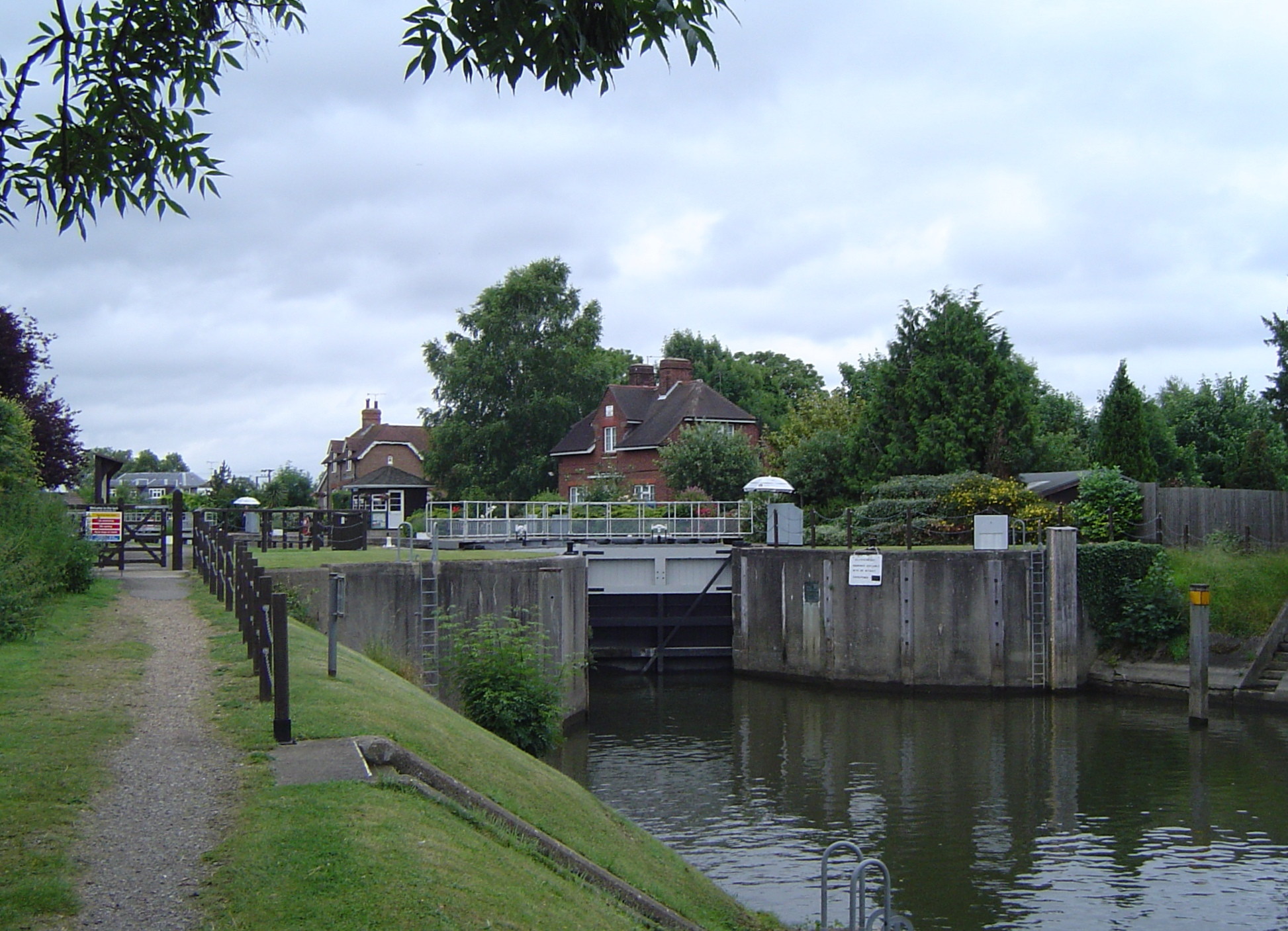
Old Windsor Lock from below

- Locks on the River Thames

Next lock upstream	River Thames	Next lock downstream
Romney Lock; 4.83 km (3.00 mi)	Old Windsor Lock; Grid reference: SU994748	Bell Weir Lock; 4.94 km (3.07 mi)
