= Ham, London (disambiguation) =

Ham, London could mean:

- Ham, London in the London Borough of Richmond upon Thames
- East Ham or West Ham in the London Borough of Newham

== See also ==
- Ham Island
