= Lion Island (Old Windsor) =

Island in the River Thames, England

Coordinates: 51.4693°N 0.5795°W

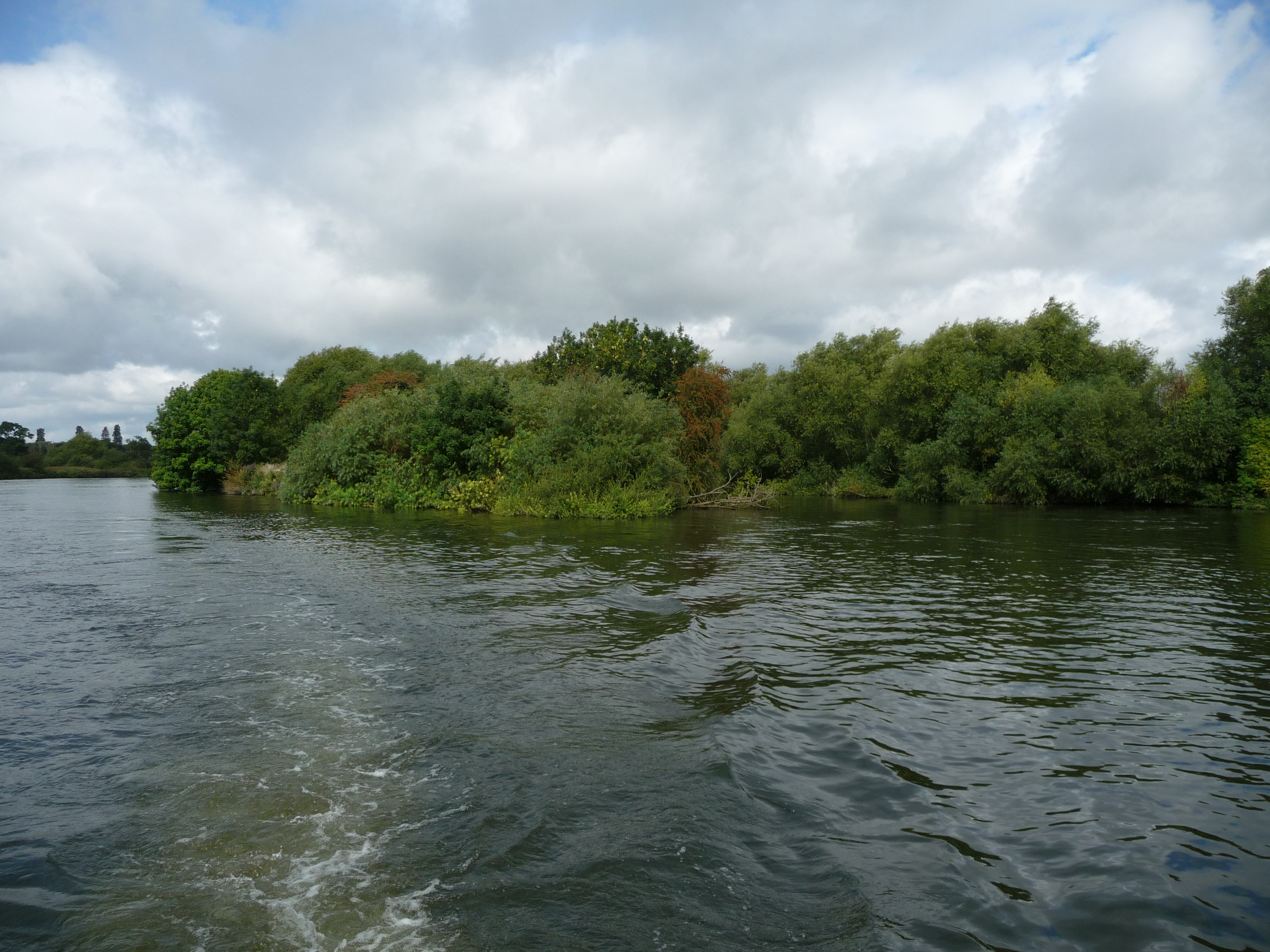
Tail of Lion Island

Map showing the location of Lion Island within Berkshire.

Lion Island is a small uninhabited island in the River Thames in England on the reach above Old Windsor Lock, near Old Windsor, Berkshire. The island is a thin wooded strip separated by a narrow channel on the north bank. It is just above Old Windsor Weir and the head of New Cut which leads to Old Windsor Lock.

The island is the relict of three long parallel islands which existed at this point before the creation of the Old Windsor Lock cut. One of these was called Nickcroft Ait, and an obstruction known as "Newman's Bucks" existed between two of them

== See also ==
- Islands in the River Thames

Next island upstream	River Thames	Next island downstream
Sumptermead Ait	Lion Island	Ham Island
