= Black Potts Railway Bridge =

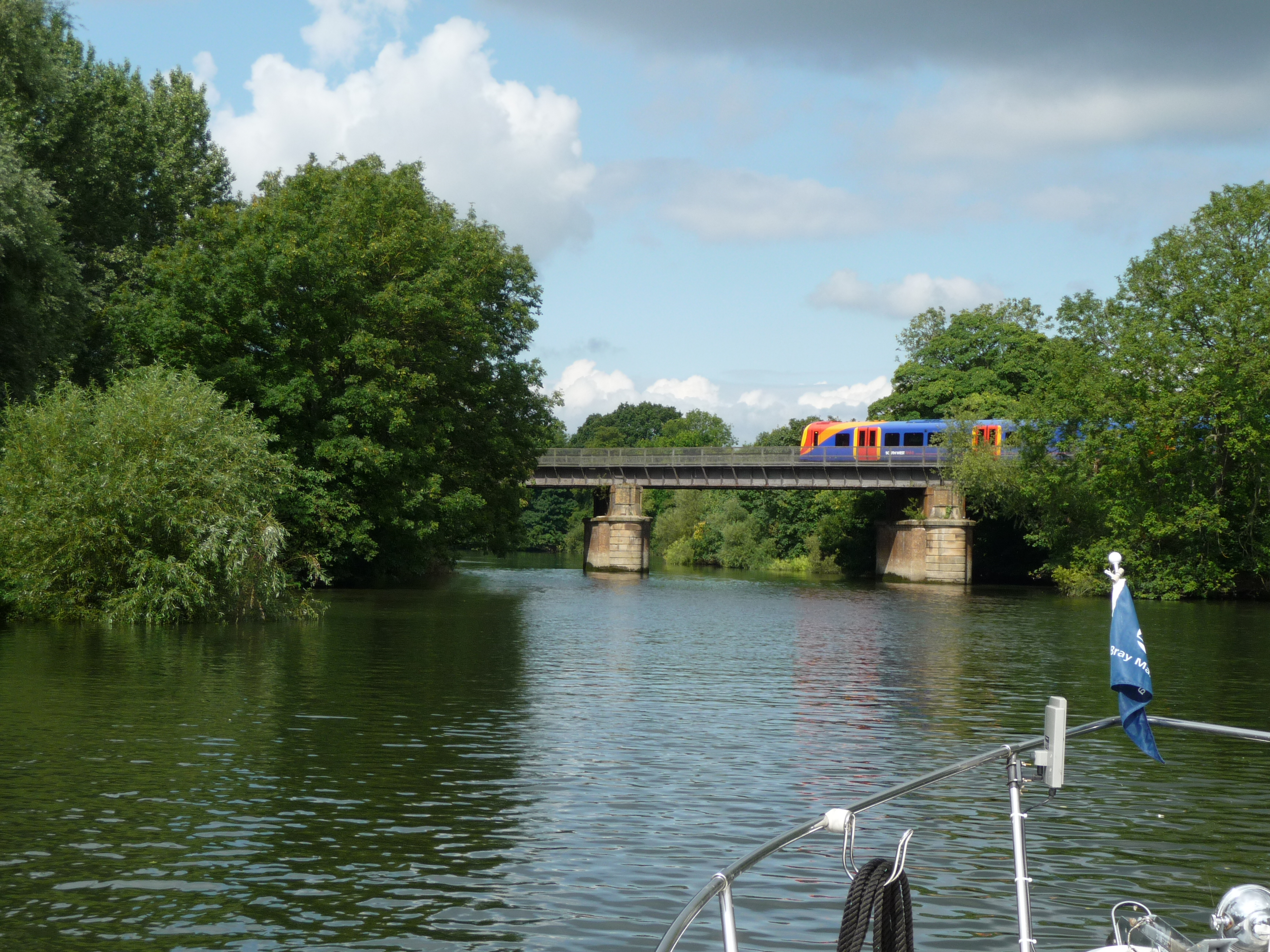
- Downstream side of Black Potts Bridge
- Coordinates: 51°29′33″N 0°35′49″W
- Carries: Staines to Windsor & Eton Line
- Crosses: River Thames
- Locale: Windsor
- Maintained by: Network Rail

Characteristics
- Material: Iron
- Height: 19 feet 6 inches (5.94 m)

History
- Opened: 1850

Black Potts Railway Bridge carries the railway from London (Waterloo) to Windsor, Berkshire across the River Thames. The Staines to Windsor & Eton Line terminates immediately after the bridge at Windsor and Eton Riverside railway station. The bridge crosses the Thames on the reach above Old Windsor Lock, shortly before Romney Lock.

== History ==
In 1849, the Windsor Staines and Richmond Railway sought leave to erect a temporary crossing here and the bridge was opened in 1850. The opening delay was caused by the collapse of one of the piers on the day before inspection. The bridge is supported in the middle by Black Potts Ait. Originally the bridge had ornate cast-iron ribs, but these corroded and were replaced with more utilitarian wrought iron girders, which radically altered the bridge's appearance.

In March 2025, the line was closed for a week while the track across the bridge was relaid and other essential maintenance was carried out.

== Black Potts Viaduct ==
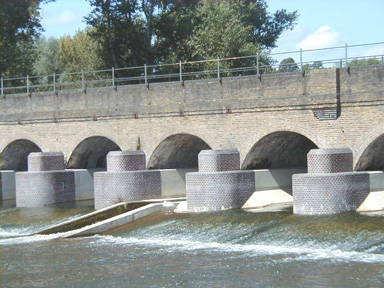
Jubilee River at Black Potts Viaduct

Immediately to the east of the bridge is the Black Potts Railway Viaduct. This had to be provided with substantial protection when the Jubilee River was constructed, as the outfall of this channel passes through the brick arches of the existing Victorian viaduct, just downstream of the Black Potts Railway Bridge.

== See also ==
- Crossings of the River Thames

Next crossing upstream	River Thames	Next crossing downstream
Windsor Bridge (pedestrian)	Black Potts Railway Bridge	Victoria Bridge (road)
