= Sumptermead Ait =

Island in the River Thames, England

Coordinates: 51.4863°N 0.5897°W

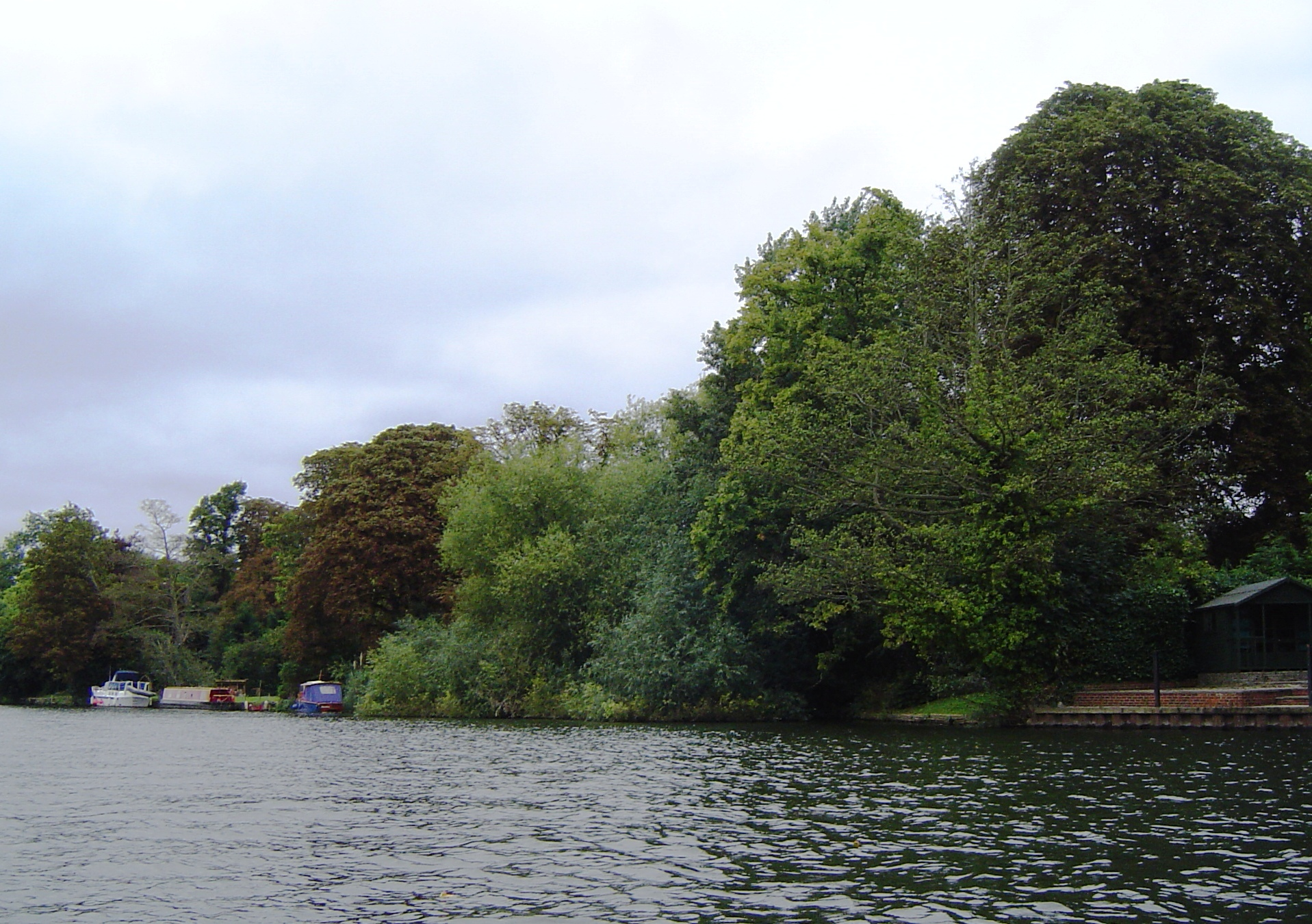
Sumptermead Ait at the downstream end

Map showing the location of Sumptermead Ait within Berkshire.

Sumptermead Ait is an island in the River Thames in England on the reach above Old Windsor Lock, near Datchet, Berkshire. The island is a thin wooded strip separated by a narrow channel on the Datchet side. In 1995 a Thames side path was created here for the diverted Thames Path.

The island has a long history, being recorded as "Sondremede" in 1263, when given to the prioress of St Helens in London, and "Saunder-meade" in 1586, when leased to the queens laundress.

== See also ==
- Islands in the River Thames

Next island upstream	River Thames	Next island downstream
Black Potts Ait	Sumptermead Ait	Lion Island
