= Jubilee River =

Flood-relief channel in southern England

Coordinates: 51.5047°N 0.6527°W

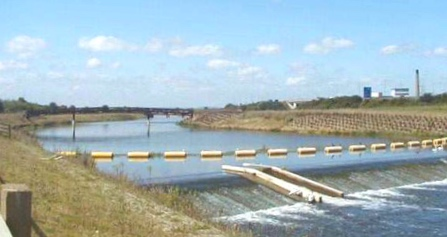
The Jubilee River at Slough Weir

The Jubilee River is an artificial flood-relief channel in southern England. It is 11.6 km (7.2 mi) long and is on average 45 metres (148 feet) wide. It was constructed in the late 1990s and early 2000s to take overflow from the River Thames and so alleviate flooding to areas in and around the towns of Maidenhead, Windsor, and Eton in the counties of Berkshire and Buckinghamshire. It achieves this by taking water from the left (at this point eastern) bank of the Thames upstream of Boulter's Lock near Maidenhead and returning it via the north bank downstream of Eton. Although successful in its stated aims, residents of villages downstream, such as Wraysbury, claim it has increased flooding in those locations.

The Jubilee River runs through Buckinghamshire and Berkshire, parallel to the River Thames for 11 km. A variety of weirs and control gates allow for flow management during flood periods.

== Construction ==
Parts of the towns of Windsor, Eton and Maidenhead are prone to flooding, because they are built on the flood plain of the River Thames. The concept of a parallel channel which could take water from the Thames above Maidenhead and return it below Windsor was conceived in the 1980s, and became known as the Maidenhead, Windsor and Eton Flood Alleviation Scheme. When the ten regional water authorities were privatised, as a result of the Water Act 1989, responsibility for rivers passed to the National Rivers Authority, which soon afterwards submitted plans for a channel which would be 50 metres (160 ft) wide and 12 kilometres (7.5 mi) long. In October 1992, a planning inquiry was held to consider the proposals. During that enquiry, P. Ackers, one of the assessors, expressed grave doubts about the hydraulic modelling that had been used to justify the scheme, suggesting that it was too optimistic.

The scheme did not receive government approval until 1995; around the same time, there was further reorganisation of the water industry, with the Environment Agency replacing the National Rivers Authority. Although Ackers' concerns had not been addressed, it commissioned the design and construction of the scheme as originally conceived, at a cost of £110 million. Throughout the planning process, from initial feasibility studies to delivery of the project, Lewin, Fryer and Partners were the consulting engineers. Principal works were the creation of the channel, various flow control mechanisms and bridges for road, rail and foot traffic.

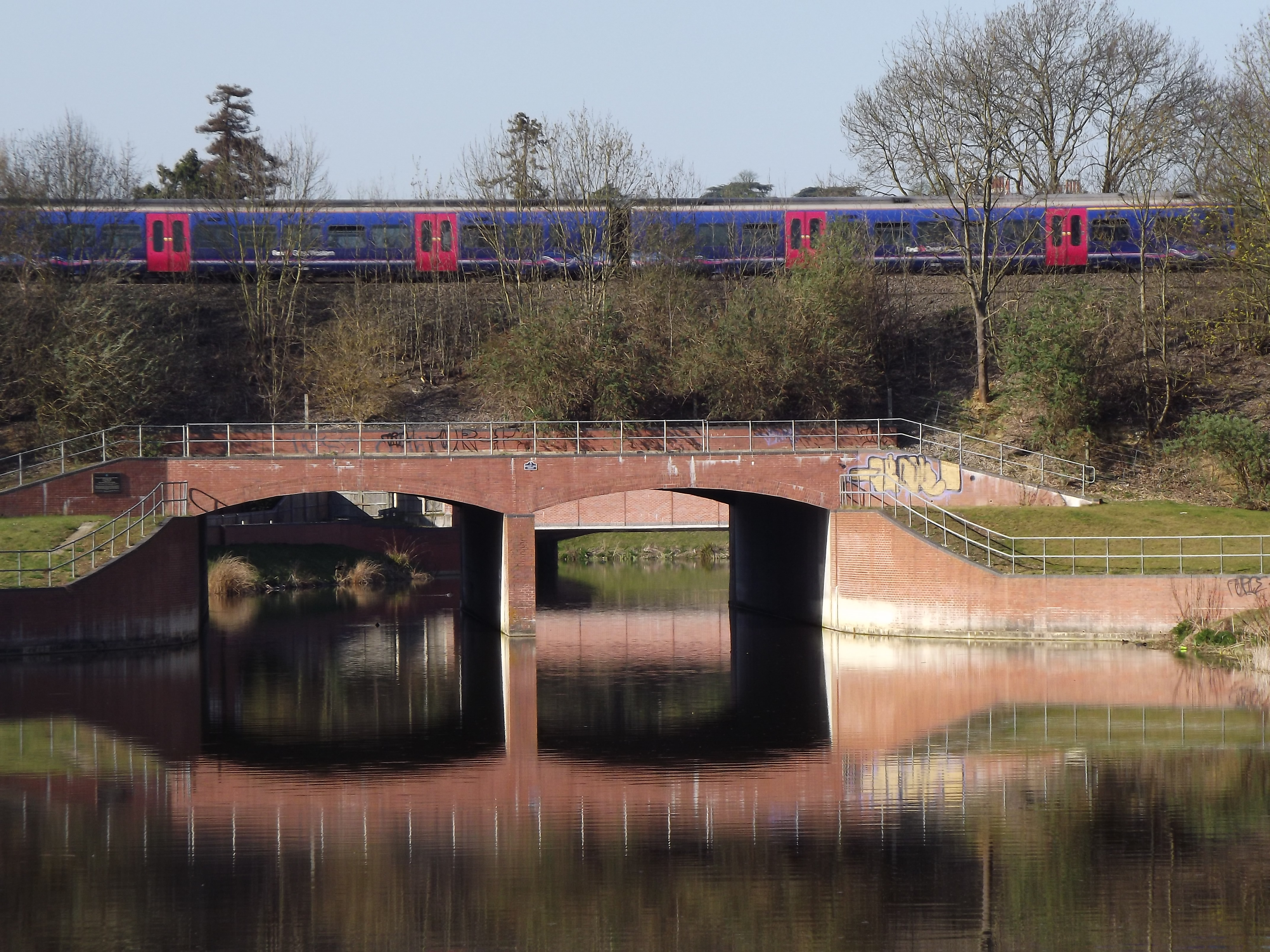
Dorney Bridge

One of the challenges was the Dorney Bridge, built to take the channel beneath the Great Western Main Line. The 19th-century Brunel-designed railway embankment continued in use, carrying passenger and goods trains between London and destinations including South Wales, Cornwall and Bristol throughout construction. The 12 m (39 ft) high embankment was stabilised along 30m of its length by freezing over a period of three months, using 175 brine tubes cooled to −25 °C (−13 °F). A tunnel was excavated through the frozen ground to just 50 millimetres (2.0 in) wider than the two 50 m (160 ft) long preformed concrete box sections, which were jacked through as the excavation proceeded. This created a 23 m (75 ft) wide by 9.5 m (31 ft) high concrete culvert which can be seen from the Bath Road Bridge.

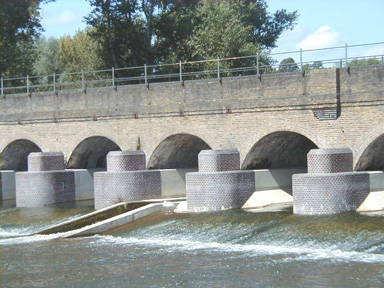
Black Potts Viaduct

The channel also had to be taken through Black Potts Viaduct, a series of 13 brick arches carrying the Waterloo to Windsor railway line over the Thames flood plain. Protective concrete and blue brick barriers were built around the older brickwork to preserve the viaduct's structural integrity, as well as to control gates to adjust the amount of water rejoining the Thames immediately downstream.

The 11.6 km (7.2 mi) channel involved complex civil engineering to deal with utility conduits, roads and railways, as well as ecological and social issues, entailing compulsory purchases, community lectures and consultations and a public enquiry. For example, at Manor Farm a weir was constructed. Conception to fruition took about 20 years.

Water is admitted to the river through sluice gates at the upstream end of the channel near Taplow. This is normally controlled by measurements of the water levels below Boulters Lock and the estimated flow of the Thames at the Datchet gauging station near Windsor. The first serious test of the new structure occurred during the flooding of early January 2003, and revealed a number of defects in the design. With both the Boulters Lock levels and the Datchet flow indicating that the channel was needed, the Taplow sluices were opened briefly on 1 January, but were then shut again until 4 January, by which time the Boulters Lock levels were 2 feet 4 inches (0.71 m) above the target levels, and the flow at Datchet was some 320 cubic metres per second, 140 cubic metres per second above the recommended flow. A subsequent investigation revealed that the Environment Agency had known there were defects in the channel since November 2002, and this had been a major factor in not operating it correctly.

When flood water was admitted to the channel, the flows were well short of its designed maximum flow capacity, and yet there was significant erosion of the banks in several places. There was considerable erosion at the Taplow Sluice, due to the lack of a stilling basin; embankments at Marsh Lane were badly damaged; the weir at Manor Farm was bent in the middle; the protection on the downstream face of Slough weir was swept away; and in Datchet, the Myrke embankment nearly collapsed. An independent assessment by the engineering consultancy WS Atkins identified that the actual capacity of the channel was around two-thirds of its design capacity, and factors affecting this were the banks being too low, the use of inappropriate materials, and failure to follow standard design criteria. A programme of repairs and upgrades to rectify the problems began, at a cost of £3.5 million, and took until 2006 to complete. The Environment Agency sued their lead design consultants for recovery of the remedial costs, and were refunded £2.75 million in an out-of-court settlement, after they admitted that the design and construction were sub-standard.

== Name ==
The name used during planning was the "Maidenhead, Windsor and Eton Flood Alleviation Scheme" (MWEFAS). The choice of a name for the river was put to the local population in a poll. The result was a strong preference for 'Jubilee', as it was being completed in Queen Elizabeth's Golden Jubilee year of 2002 and one of the Queen's main residences was at Windsor Castle, in one of the three towns being protected by the scheme.

== In use ==
The watercourse was designed to look like a natural river; its banks have artificially constructed wildlife habitats intended to replace those lost from the banks of the Thames during urban expansion in the 19th and 20th centuries. During construction 38 hectares (94 acres) of reed beds and 5 hectares (12 acres) of wet woodland were laid down and about 250,000 trees were planted.

The river is well used by walkers, runners, swimmers, canoeists, wildlife enthusiasts and cyclists: a footpath combined with National Cycle Route 61 runs along virtually its entire length. A wide variety of bird life can be seen along the river, including green woodpeckers, cormorants, lapwing and red kites.

During flooding in the early months of 2014, some residents of Ham Island (in Old Windsor) and Wraysbury said that the Jubilee River had increased the height of the flooded Thames in those places which, along with much of the river upstream of London, saw water levels not seen since 1947. Wraysbury had also suffered significant flooding in 2003. The Environment Agency in the 2010s undertook a widening and dredging programme of Thames works to assist with downstream flows.

== See also ==
- Tributaries of the River Thames
- Meander cutoff
- List of rivers in England
- Waterways in the United Kingdom
- 1947 Thames flood

| Next confluence upstream | River Thames | Next confluence downstream |
| Clewer Mill Stream (south) | Jubilee River | Colne Brook (north) |
