= Deadwater Ait =

Island in the River Thames in England

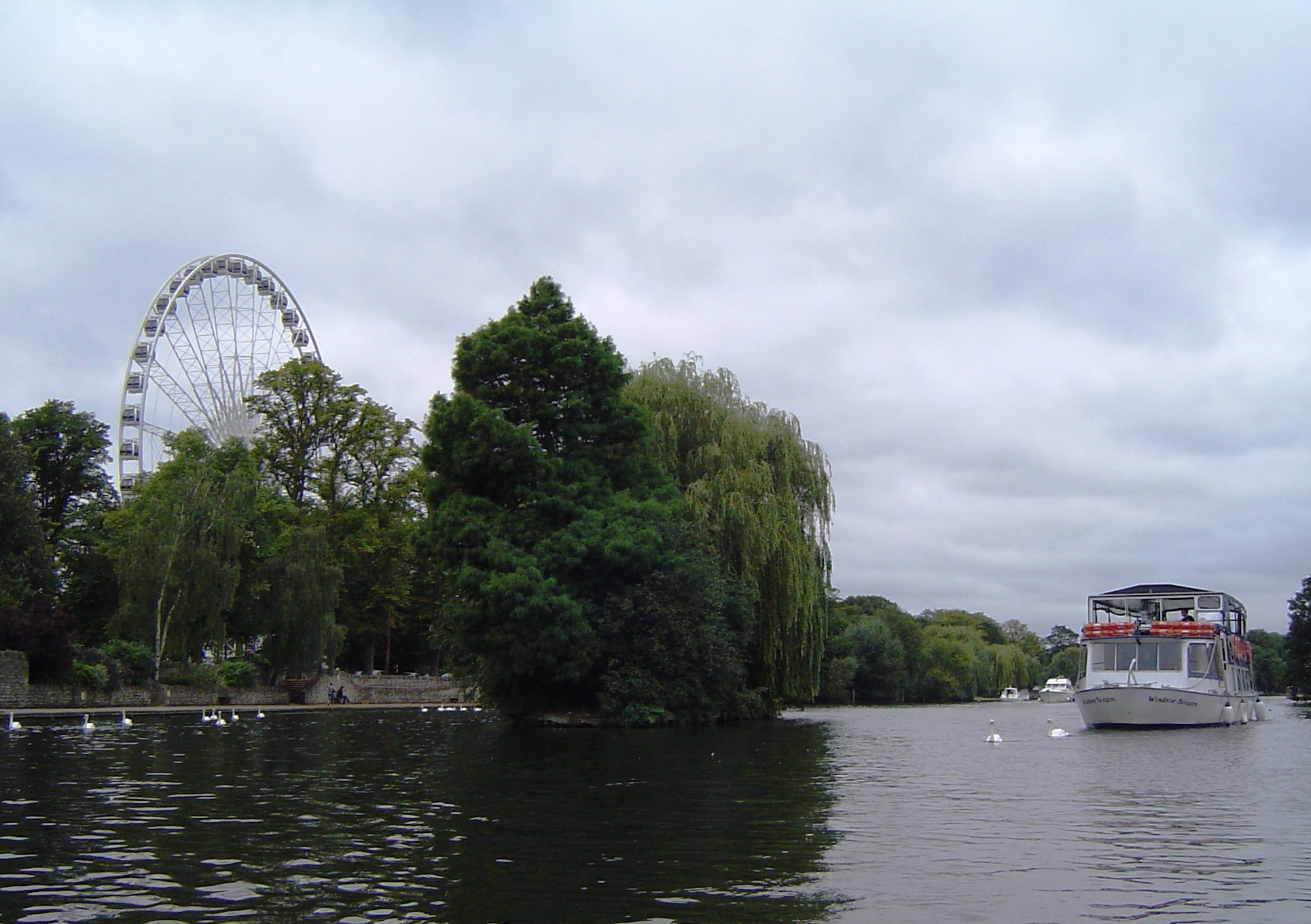
- Deadwater Ait from downstream

- Location within Berkshire

Geography
- Location: River Thames
- Coordinates: 51.4850°N 0.6134°W
- OS grid reference: SU963771

Administration
- United Kingdom

Deadwater Ait is an island in the River Thames in England on the reach above Romney Lock, near Windsor, Berkshire.

== Position and use ==
The island is an uninhabited tree-covered strip adjacent to the Windsor bank of the river between Windsor Bridge and Windsor Railway Bridge.

Swans, geese and a small number of coots all live on this island.

== Barry Avenue Island ==
The same distance as its length downstream, is Barry Avenue Island, or unnamed, which is slightly larger at .641 acres (0.259 ha), compared to Deadwater's size, 0.550 acres (0.223 ha) as itemised by 25-inch-to-the-mile maps produced, out of copyright, in 1897. It is the same distance from the Windsor bank and has the same use for habitat and wildlife.

== See also ==
- Islands in the River Thames

Next island upstream	River Thames	Next island downstream
Baths Island	Deadwater Ait; Grid reference SU963771	Firework Ait
