= Cutlers Ait =

Island in the River Thames, England

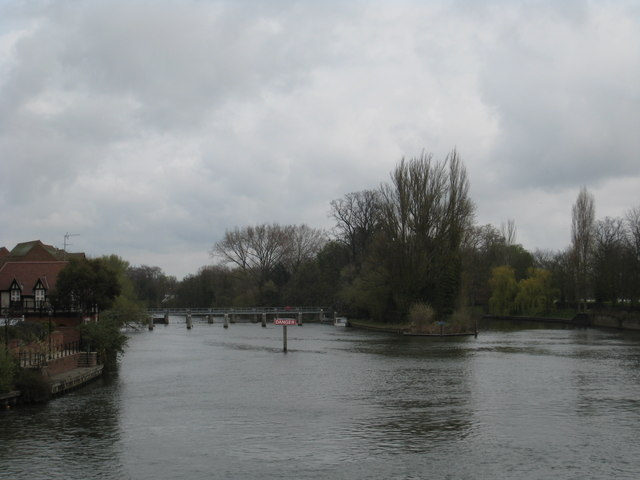

- Location within Berkshire

Geography
- Location: River Thames
- Coordinates: 51°29′22″N 0°36′22″W

Administration
- United Kingdom

Cutlers Ait is an island in the River Thames in England adjacent to Romney Island and Romney Lock, near Windsor, Berkshire.

The island is a tree-covered strip adjacent to the opposite bank of the river from the Lock, near Eton. Romney weir sits between the two islands.

== See also ==
- Islands in the River Thames

Next island upstream	River Thames	Next island downstream
Firework Ait	Cutlers Ait	Romney Island
