= Firework Ait =

Island in the River Thames, England

Coordinates: 51.4852°N 0.6104°W

Map showing the location of Firework Ait within Berkshire.

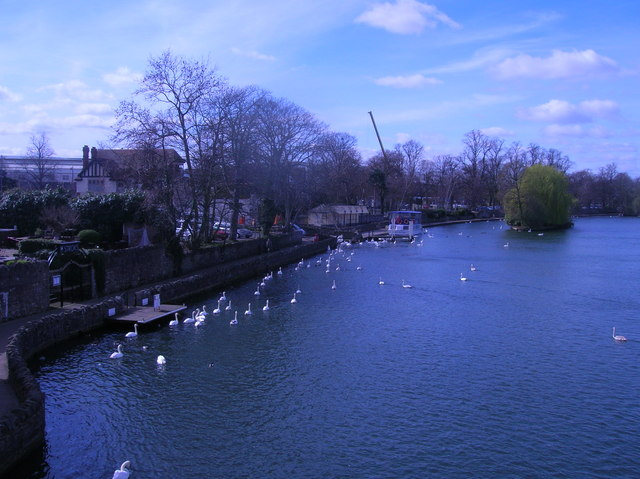
The ait is the small piece of land on the right hand side of this photograph from non-motorised Windsor Bridge

Firework Ait is an islet in the River Thames in England on the reach above Romney Lock known as the Windsor and Eton reach, Berkshire. It is the smallest island on the Thames with an official map-published name.

== Status ==
The island is the smallest on the Thames with an official map-published name and is in the middle of a widely separated series of three close to the Windsor (right) bank. It is approximately 100 metres above Windsor Bridge. The facing riverside road in restrictive sections as to motorized traffic provides a promenade and cycle way between the heart of the town centre, a leisure centre and adjoining Alexandra Gardens, a park.

== History ==
An account from the 1840s of life at Eton hypothesises that Percy Bysshe Shelley when at Eton in 1805 would have taken his skiff across to the "eyot which then served for fireworks".

== See also ==
- Islands in the River Thames
- River island

Next island upstream	River Thames	Next island downstream
Barry Avenue (or unnamed) island and Deadwater Ait	Firework Ait	Cutlers Ait
