= Baths Island =

Island in the River Thames, England

Coordinates: 51.4864°N 0.6185°W

Map showing the location of Baths Island within Berkshire.

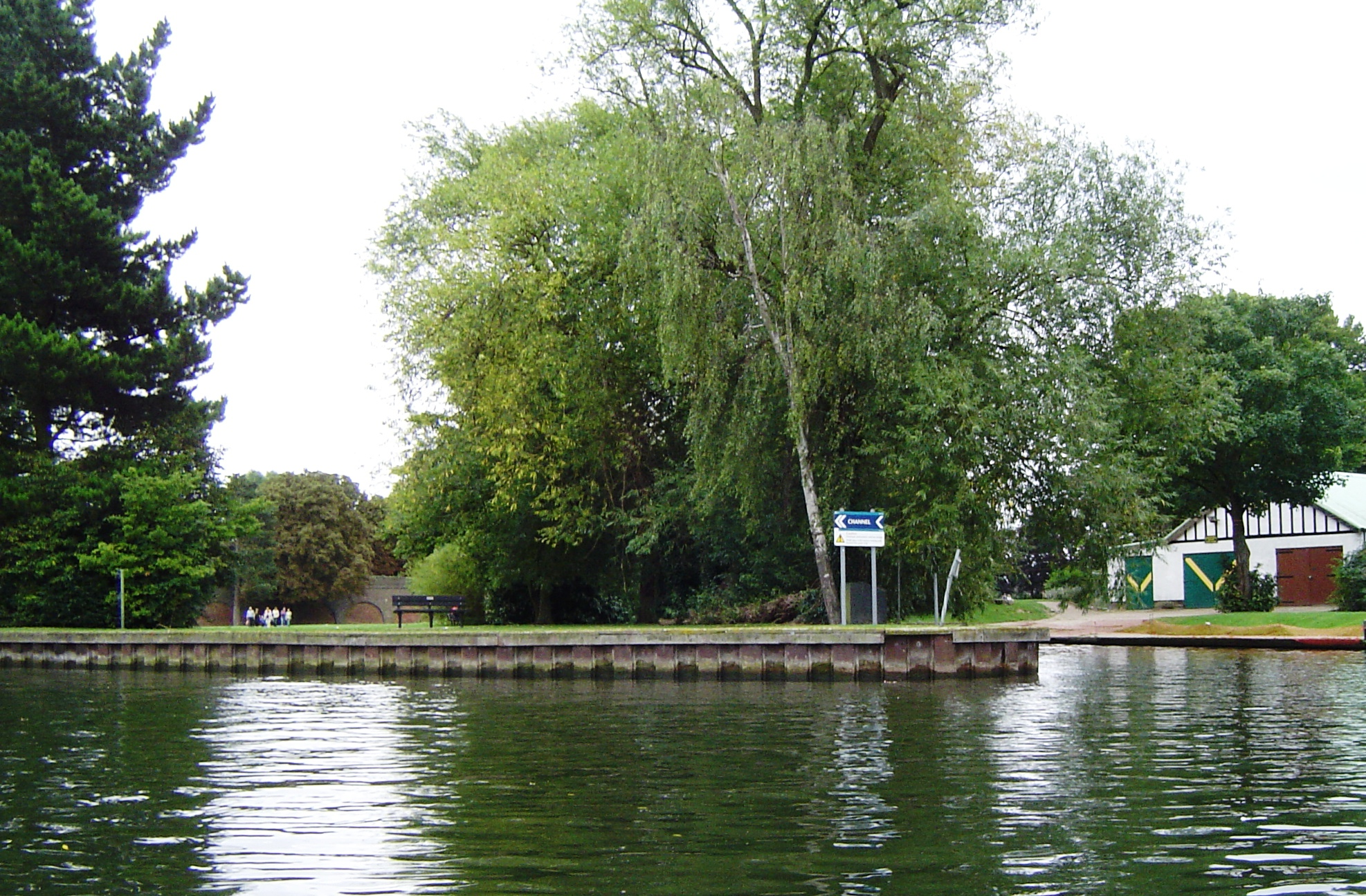
Baths Island from upstream

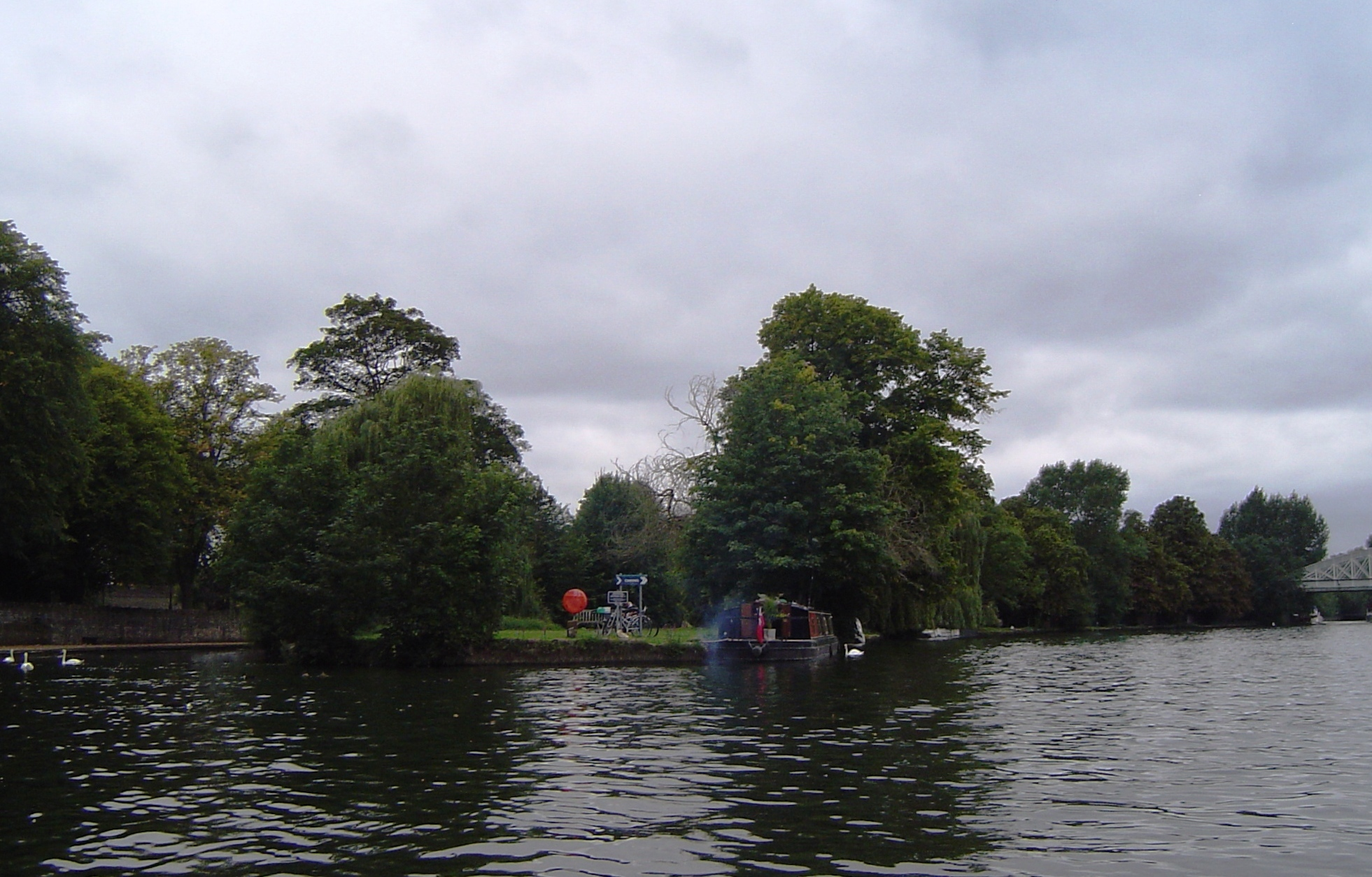
Baths Island from downstream

Baths Island is an island in the River Thames in England on the reach above Romney Lock, between Eton Wick and Windsor, Berkshire.

The island is unpopulated and contains public open space. It carries the central part of Windsor Railway Bridge across the river.

== See also ==
- Islands in the River Thames

Next island upstream	River Thames	Next island downstream
Bush Ait	Baths Island	Deadwater Ait and Barry Avenue Island
