= Romney Island =

Island in the River Thames, England

Coordinates: 51.4905°N 0.6049°W

Map showing the location of Romney Island within Berkshire.

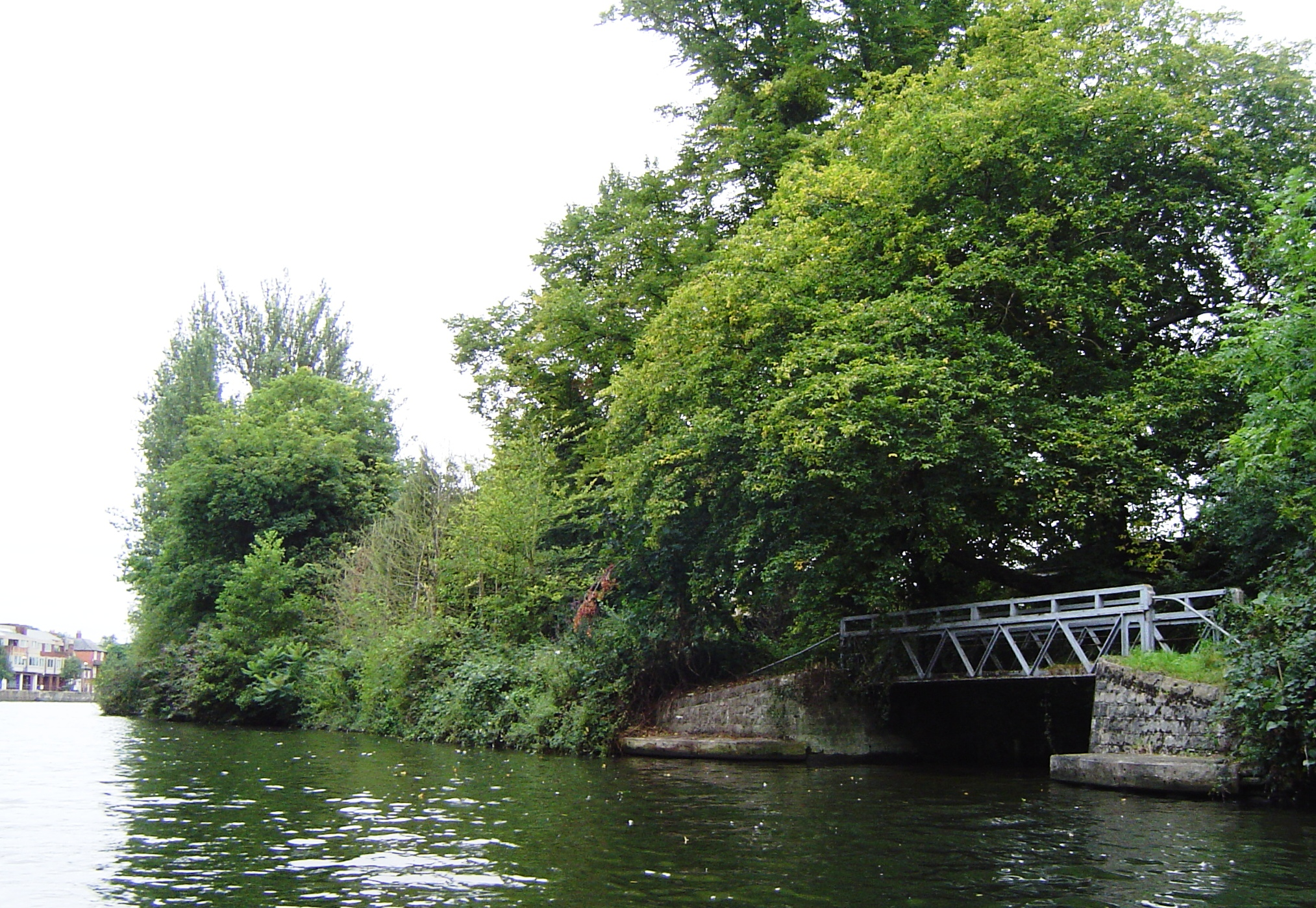
Head of Romney Island in Windsor

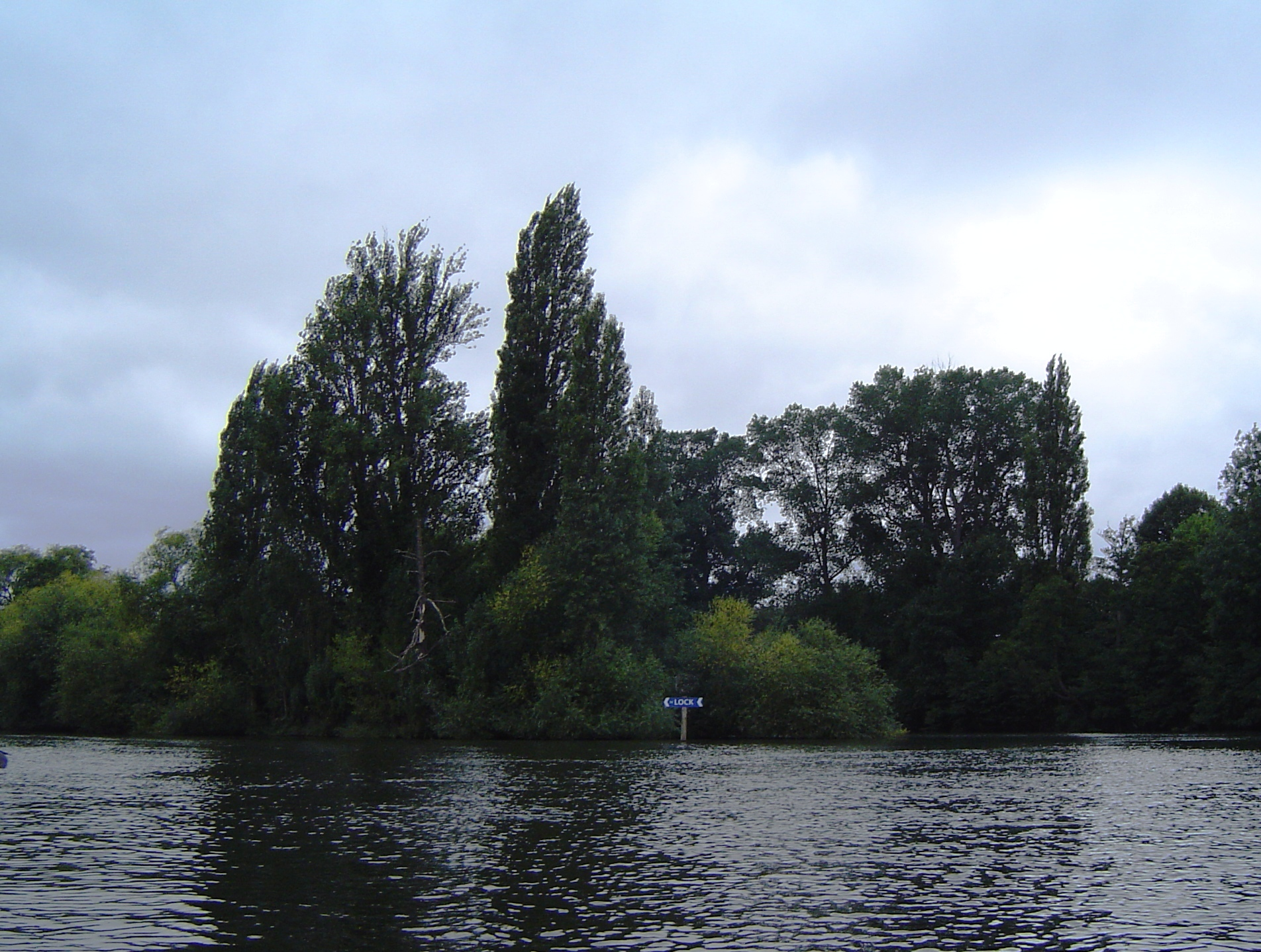
Tail of Romney Island from downstream

Romney Island is an island in the River Thames in England connected to Romney Lock, at Windsor, Berkshire. It is a long thin island with trees and scrub, with the upstream end in Windsor and the downstream end almost at Black Potts.

The island has always been a popular place for angling and Isaak Walton used to fish from here. The island separates the weir stream from the navigation channel to the lock. Proposals to build a hydro scheme at the weir dated from 2004, with various revised schemes put forward since then. A revised scheme, using Archimedes screws, went ahead in 2011 and began generating power in 2013.

== See also ==
- Islands in the River Thames

Next island upstream	River Thames	Next island downstream
Cutlers Ait	Romney Island	Black Potts Ait
