= Ham Island =

Island in Berkshire, England

Coordinates: 51.469°N 0.566°W

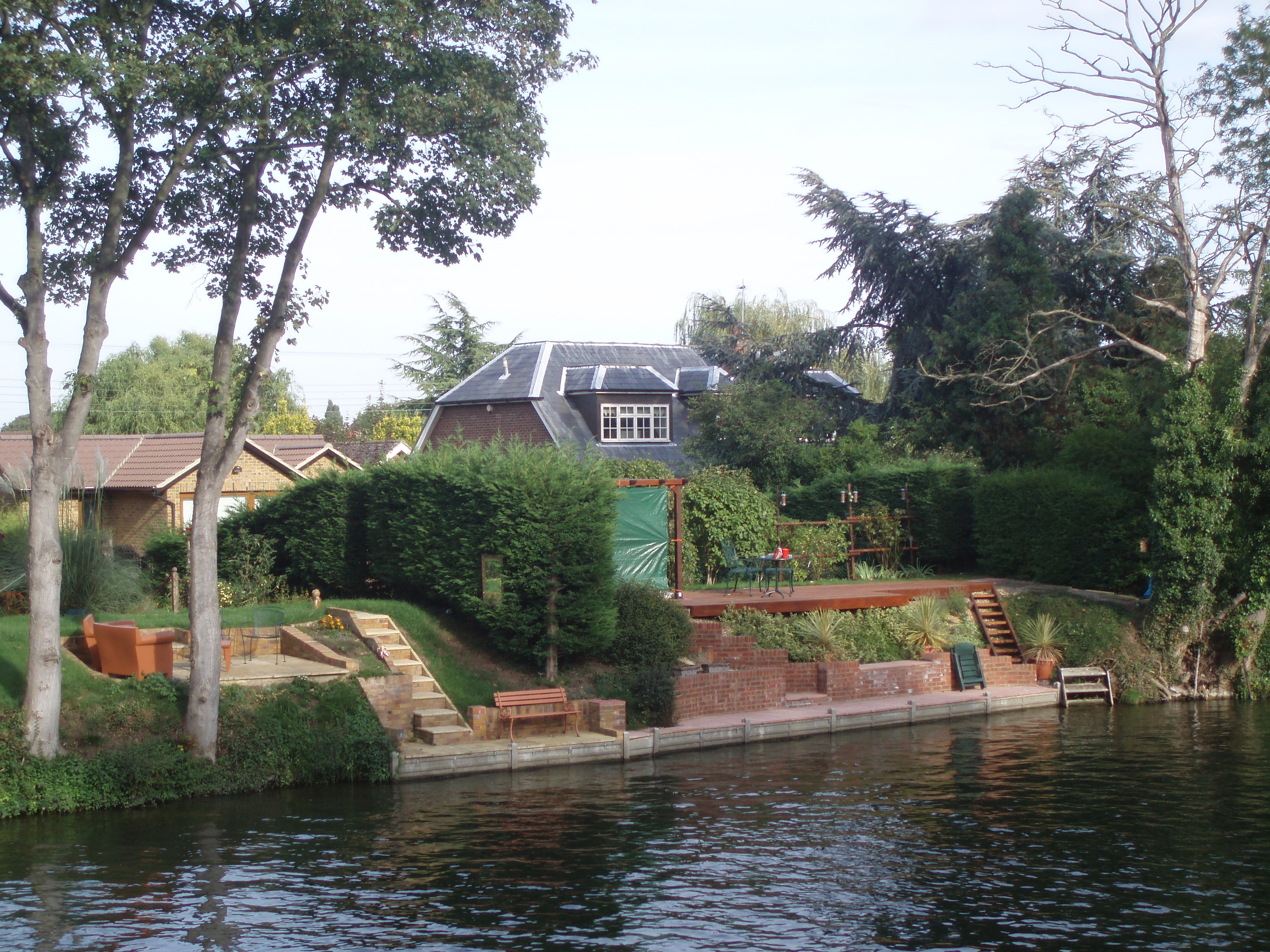
- Ham Island and The Cut

- Location within Berkshire
- Ceremonial county: Berkshire
- Region: South East
- Country: England
- Sovereign state: United Kingdom
- Postcode district: SL4
- Police: Thames Valley
- Fire: Royal Berkshire
- Ambulance: South Central

Ham Island is an inhabited man-made island of roughly 50 hectares (125 acres) in the River Thames in Old Windsor in England. It was a mature meander of the Thames until a channel was dug, the New Cut, to build Old Windsor Lock which reduced the navigable distance by two thirds.

The island contains 37 dwellings, a couple of which were abandoned during the 2014 flood.

== History ==
The current island was a peninsula partly surrounded by a meander of the Thames until 1822 when the Thames Navigation Commissioners dug a channel of the river across the neck, the New Cut, to build Old Windsor Lock at its downstream end. At the upstream end a weir was constructed across the mainstream of the river, and at the downstream end of the cut the Old Windsor Lock also has a small weir. Accordingly, the distance in navigation was cut to around one third.

== Inhabitation ==
The islands accommodates 37 privately owned dwellings. The original houses on the island, now almost entirely rebuilt in a more luxurious style, were quite modest – many were holiday homes. The island is also the site of a water treatment plant, well-screened from the homes, and the Blueacre Horse Rescue centre which had to be evacuated during the February 2014 flooding.

== Literature ==
The island is referred to in Three Men in a Boat as, passing up through the lock at this point for the first time they note they can spy Windsor Castle in the distance. This trip is still facilitated with boat hire companies in riverside settlements such as Maidenhead, Windsor and Staines.

== Protection ==
Part of the island is included within the Scheduled Ancient Monument, Kingsbury medieval palace and associated monuments.

In February 2014 the Thames burst its banks forcing some residents to leave their flooded homes.

== See also ==
- Islands in the River Thames

== Gallery ==
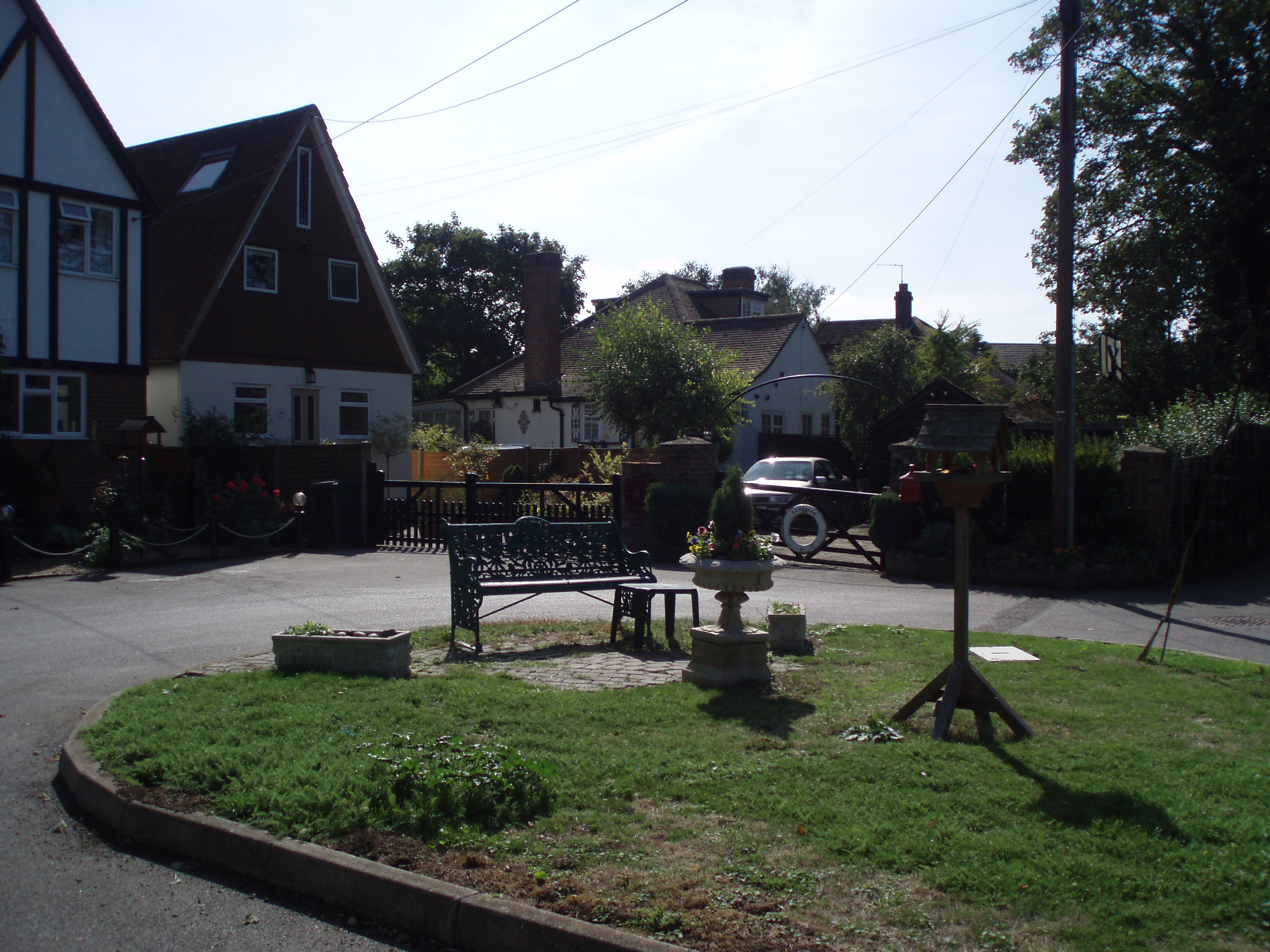
The Turning Circle

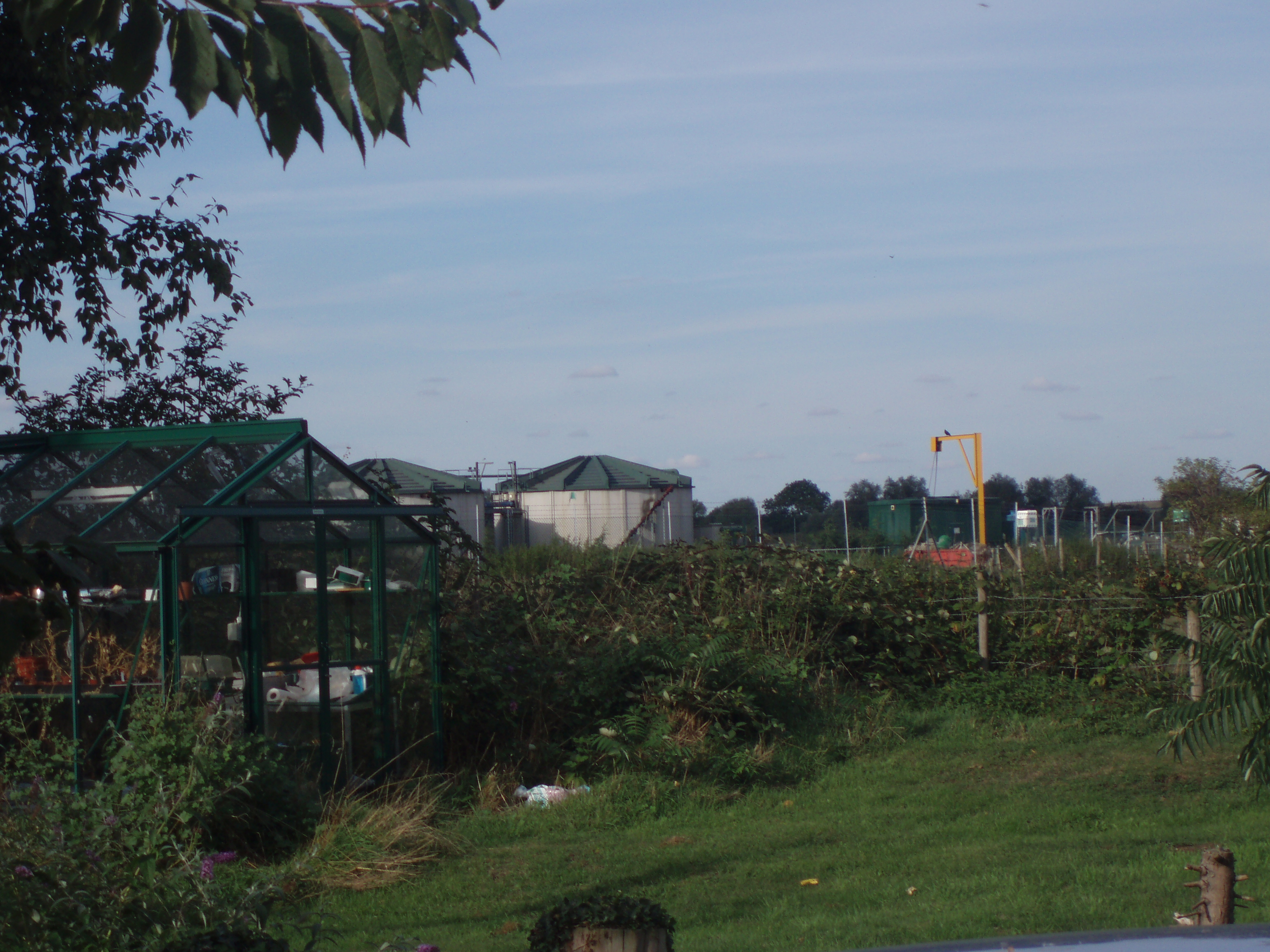
Thames Water's wastewater treatment works

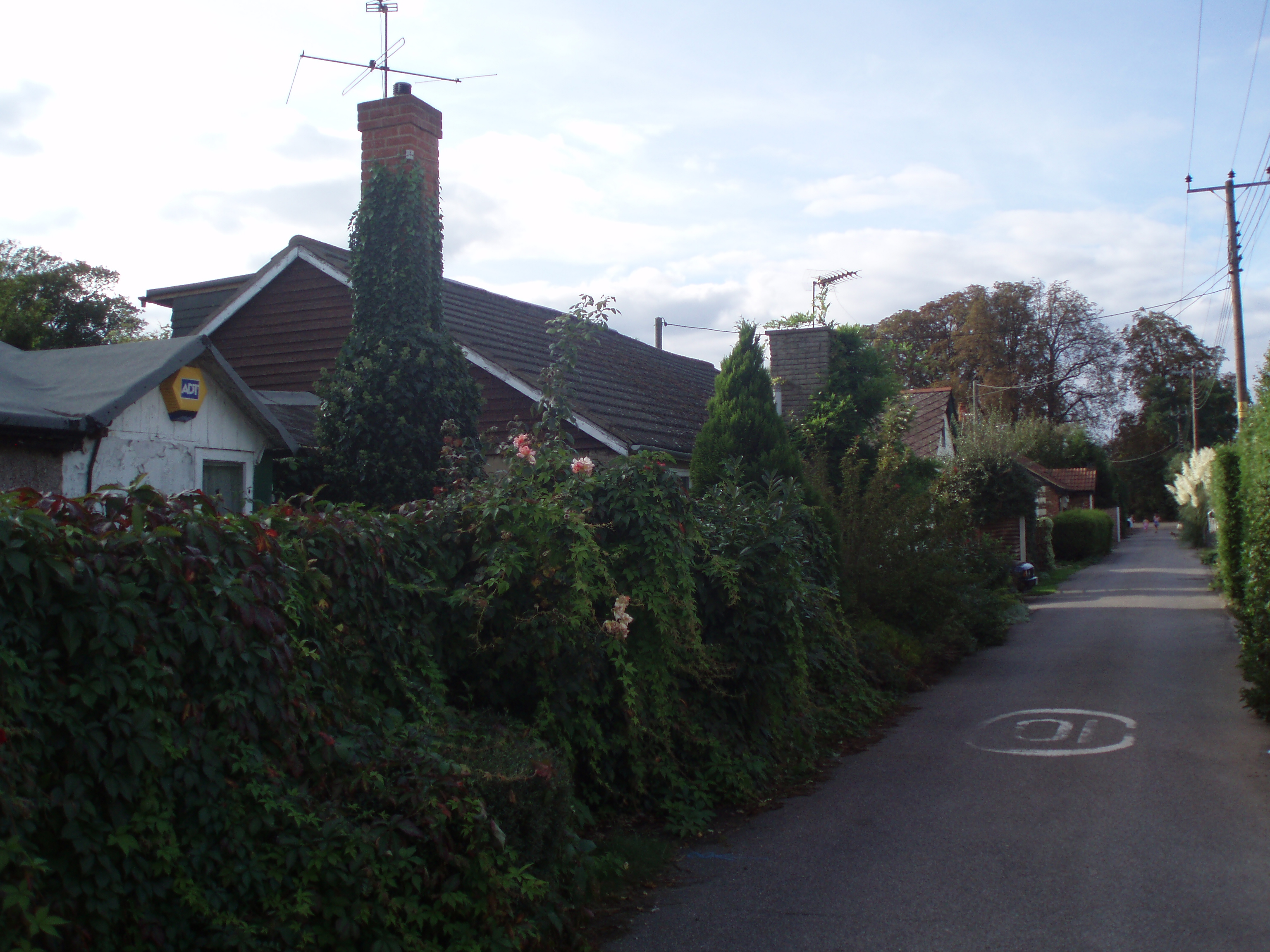
Towards the Bridge

Next island upstream	River Thames	Next island downstream
Lion Island (Old Windsor)	Ham Island	Friday Island
