= Romney Lock =

Lock on the River Thames in Berkshire, England

Coordinates: 51.49174°N 0.60422°W

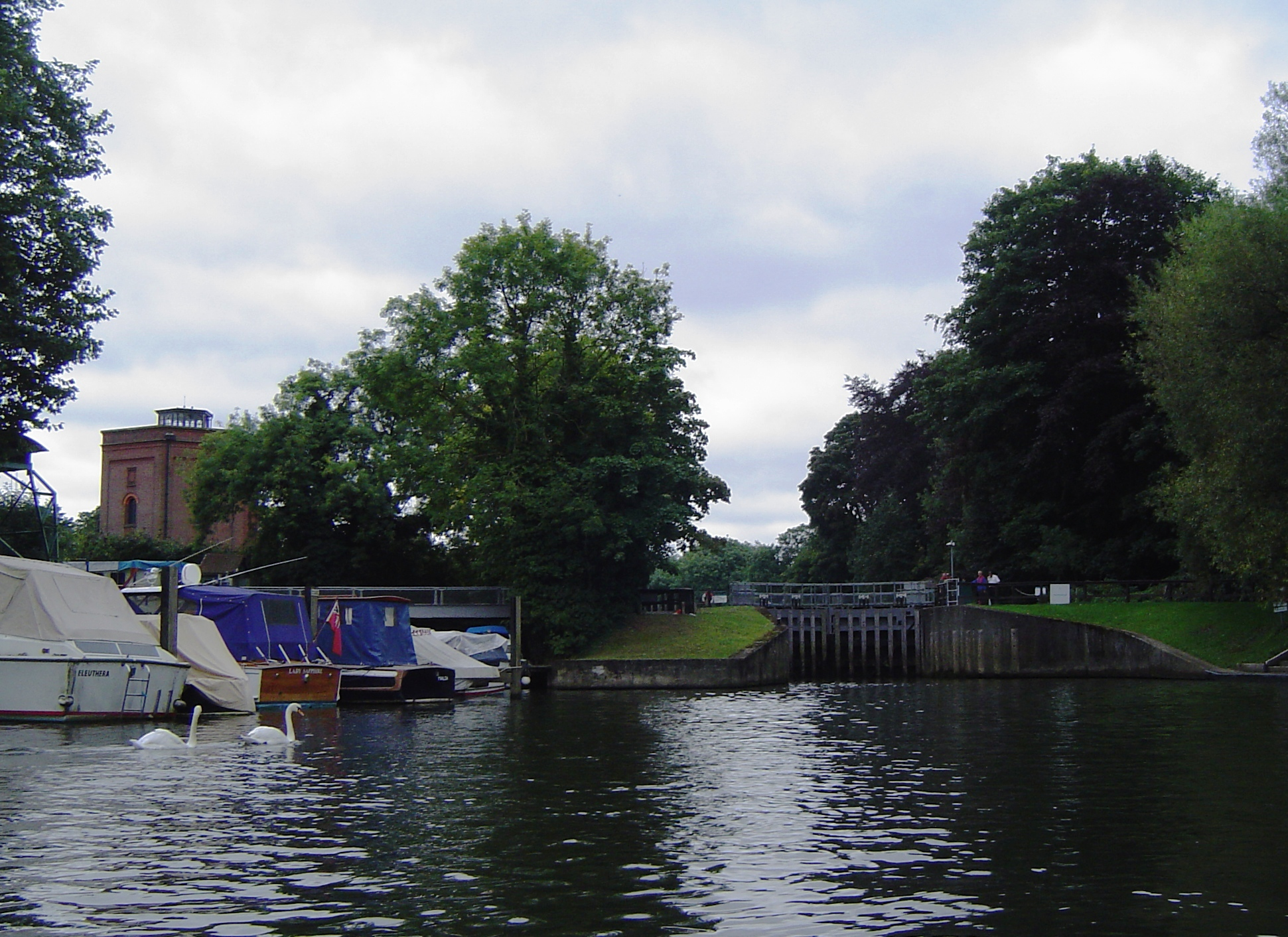
- Romney Lock from downstream
- Waterway: River Thames
- County: Berkshire
- Maintained by: Environment Agency
- Operation: Hydraulic
- First built: 1798
- Latest built: 1980
- Length: 78.50 m (257 ft 7 in)
- Width: 7.45 m (24 ft 5 in)
- Fall: 2.01 m (6 ft 7 in)
- Above sea level: 60 feet (18 m)
- Distance to Teddington Lock: 23 miles (37 km)
- Power is available out of hours

Romney Lock is a lock on the River Thames in England near Windsor and Eton, about half a mile downstream of Windsor Bridge. It is on the Windsor side of the river next to a boatyard and adjoins Romney Island, a long strip-shaped ait in the middle of the river. The first lock was built by the Thames Navigation Commission in 1798.

The weir is some distance upstream near the end of Romney Island and runs across the river to Cutlers Ait. A small 200kW hydroelectric generation station was installed in 2011 to supply electricity to Windsor Castle.

== History ==
The first proposal for a pound lock was in 1774 which was to be further upstream at Firework Ait by Windsor Bridge. However nothing happened until the lock was opened on the present site in 1797, built of oak. There was no weir at the site previously and because of protests, none was built at that time. Barges were still liable to pay the lock fee even if they used the other channel. By the following year a weir was found to be indispensable, and so it was built. The lock was rebuilt by the Thames Conservancy in 1869 and the weir was rebuilt further upstream at the beginning of the 20th century. The lock was rebuilt again in 1979/80.

== Access to the lock ==
The lock can be reached from Windsor down a long single track road which starts from the car park behind Windsor and Eton Riverside railway station.

== Reach above the lock ==
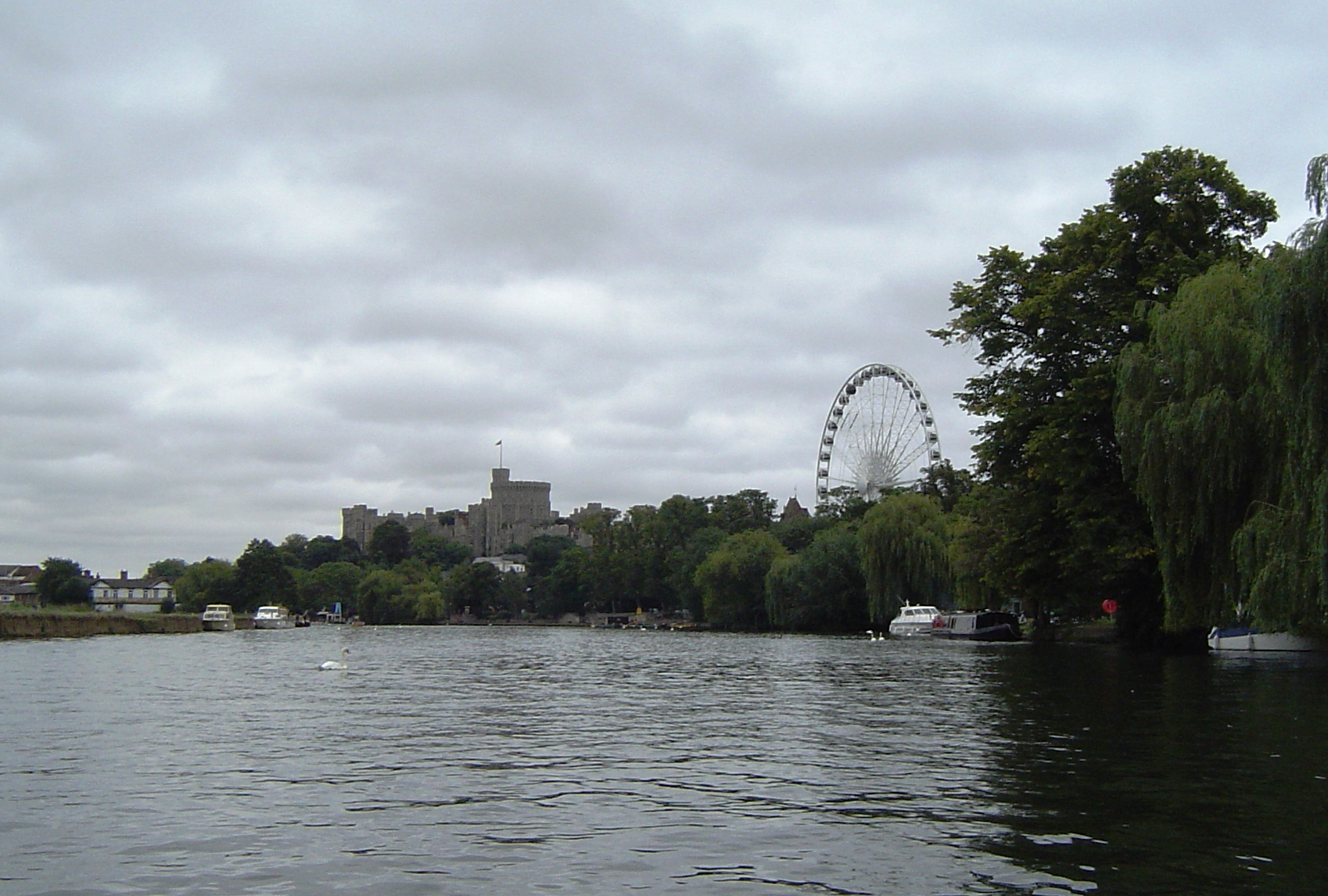
Windsor from the river

Eton College is on the left bank, beyond Cutler's Ait immediately upstream of which is the compact town Eton itself where Windsor Bridge crosses. On the Windsor bank the river skirts the town centre and set close to it upstream of Windsor Bridge is an islet, the smallest named on the Thames, Firework Ait and similarly Deadwater Ait. Just upstream of the islets are the Isambard Kingdom Brunel-designed Windsor Railway Bridge for the second railway serving the town which crosses Baths Island, and the late 20th century road bridge Queen Elizabeth Bridge. Cuckoo Weir Stream is a short backwater taking a left bank route under Queen Elizabeth Bridge — on the right bank associated with Clewer is the confluence of the Clewer Mill Stream. The main river then has a sharp Z-bend near Windsor Racecourse, then continues past open fields near the village of Eton Wick before it reaches Boveney Lock. Rowing on the reach has been reduced by the 2006 creation of Dorney Lake in the ancient and modern civil and ecclesiastical parishes Dorney.

Thames Path

The Thames Path follows the track on the south bank to Windsor and then crosses Windsor Bridge to the north (Eton) side, where it continues to Boveney Lock.

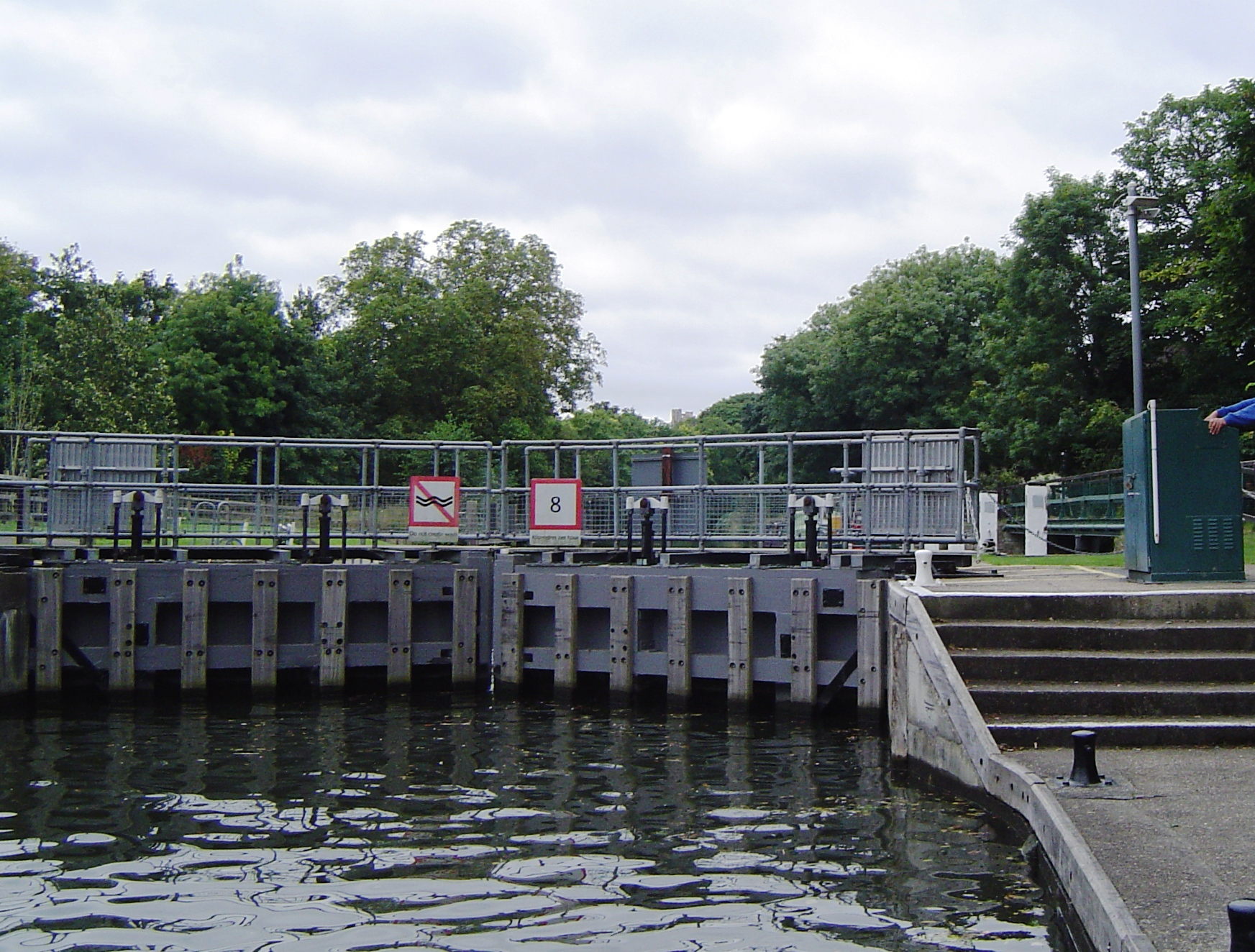
The lock looking upstream with Windsor Castle on the horizon

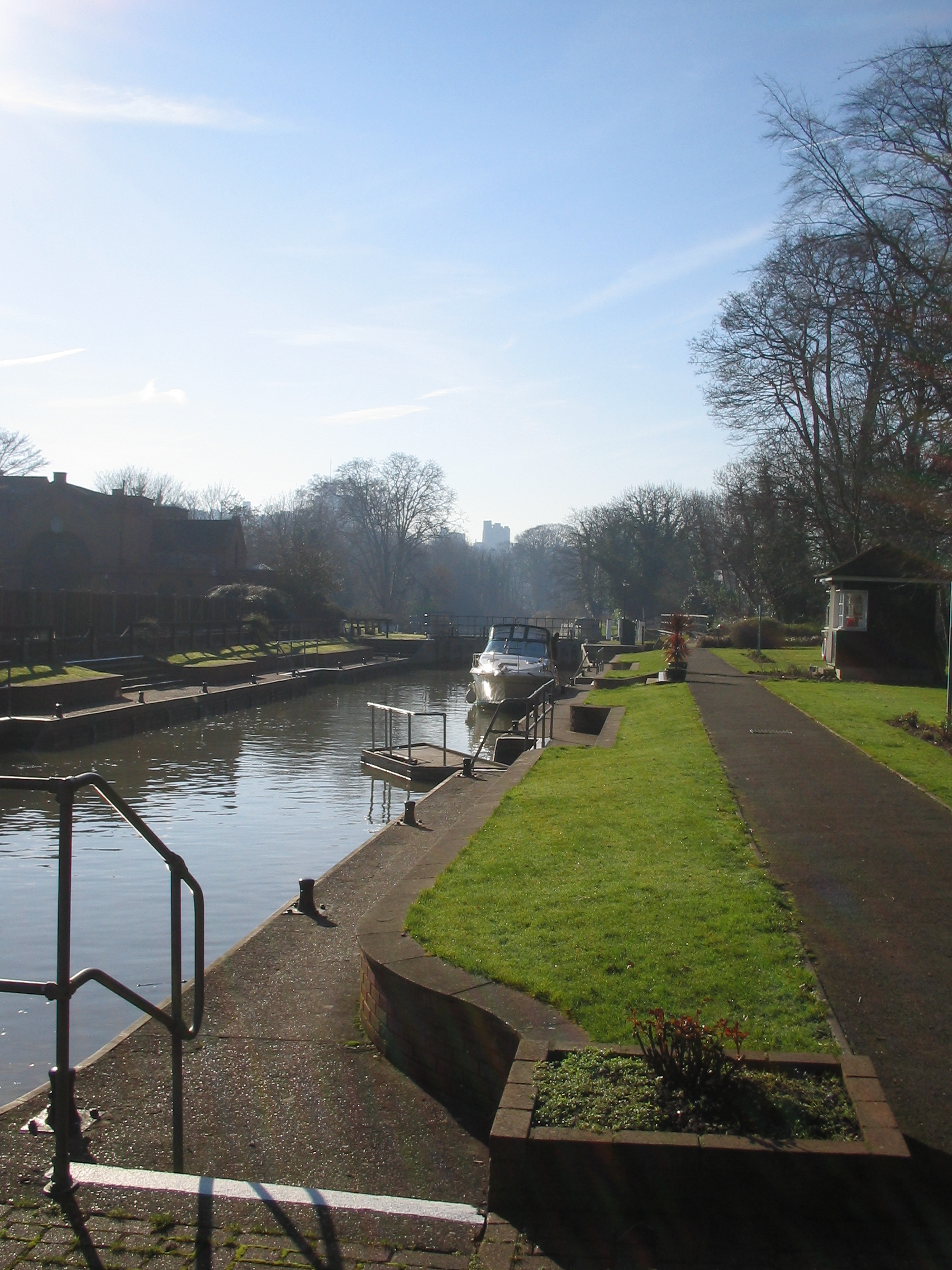
Romney Lock in winter looking upstream

== See also ==
- Locks on the River Thames
- Rowing on the River Thames

Next lock upstream	River Thames	Next lock downstream
Boveney Lock; 3.75 km (2.33 mi)	Romney Lock; Grid reference: SU970779	Old Windsor Lock; 4.83 km (3.00 mi)
