= Old Windsor =

Coordinates: 51°27′36″N 0°35′10″W

- Village and civil parish
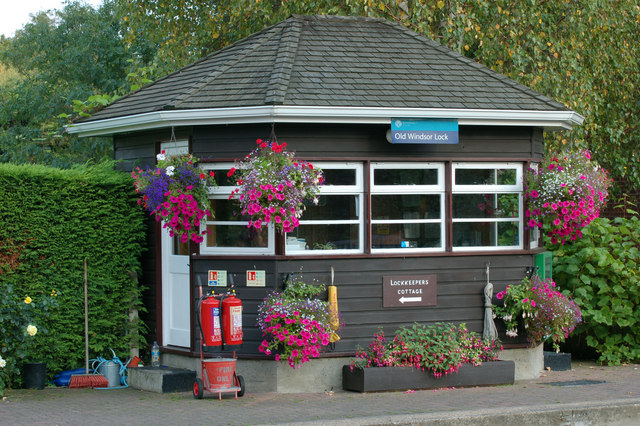
- The lock hut at Old Windsor Lock.

- Location within Berkshire
- Population: 4,775 (2001); 4,977 (2011 Census)
- OS grid reference: SU9874
- Civil parish: Old Windsor
- Unitary authority: Windsor and Maidenhead
- Ceremonial county: Berkshire
- Region: South East
- Country: England
- Sovereign state: United Kingdom
- Post town: WINDSOR
- Postcode district: SL4
- Dialling code: 01753
- Police: Thames Valley
- Fire: Royal Berkshire
- Ambulance: South Central
- UK Parliament: Windsor

Old Windsor is a village and civil parish, in the Royal Borough of Windsor and Maidenhead, in Berkshire, England. It is bounded by the River Thames to the east and the Windsor Great Park to the west.

== Etymology ==
The name originates from old English Windles-ore, Windlesora, or winch by the riverside. The village was originally called Windsor, until the (now larger) town of "New" Windsor, 3 miles (5 km) from the village, grew up next to Windsor Castle and assumed the name. Windsor is first mentioned in the Anglo-Saxon Chronicle.

== History ==
=== Kingsbury ===
Old Windsor was once the site of an important palace of the Saxon kings. The settlement is documented as a defended royal manor in Edward the Confessor's time, but archaeological evidence suggests royal connections had existed since at least the 9th century. The Saxon royal site was excavated between 1953 and 1958, and the finds are at Reading Museum. Edward gave the manor to the Abbot of Westminster in 1066, but it was soon taken back into royal possession by William the Conqueror.

Old Windsor was popular with the monarch because of its convenient location; near to the River Thames for transport and Windsor Forest for hunting. Old Windsor was also an early minster location and market, probably associated with a lock, and important riverside mill complex. The Saxon palace was eventually superseded by the Norman Windsor Castle, at 'New' Windsor. The palace, however, became a popular royal hunting lodge while Windsor Castle was still a fortress rather than a comfortable residence.

=== The Beaumont Estate ===
At the southern end of the village is the historic Beaumont Estate. First mention of the estate is recorded around the year 1300, when the estate, and much of the surrounding area was under the ownership of Hugo de Remenham. The estate was, at the time, known as Remenham, and occupied a larger area than it does now, stretching all the way down to the river Thames, and including the historic pub, the Bells of Ouzeley. After changing hands a few times, the estate was bought by Henry Frederick Tynne who had the house redesigned in 1705 by architect James Gibbs, renamed it Bowman's Lodge. The estate was acquired in the mid-eighteenth century by Sophia, Duchess of Kent. In 1751 the estate was bought by the Duke of Roxburghe for his son, the Marquess of Beaumont, who renamed it Beaumont Lodge.

It was bought in 1786 by Warren Hastings, the first Governor-General of India, and most notable resident of the estate, for £12,000. In 1790, the owner Henry Griffith had Windsorian architect Henry Emlyn rebuild, and modify the house. The estate was sold in 1805 for £14,000 to Viscount Ashbrook, a friend of George IV. After the Viscount's death in 1846, the Bells of Ouzeley pub was sold by his widow, and in 1854, she sold the estate to the Society of Jesus, who used it as Beaumont College. In 1861 it became the St. Stanislaus College, Beaumont; a Catholic boarding school for boys. In 1967, the school closed, and moved to merge with Stonyhurst College, in Lancashire. The estate was subsequently bought by the computer company ICL, and then by Hayley Conference Centres, in 2003.

=== Churches ===
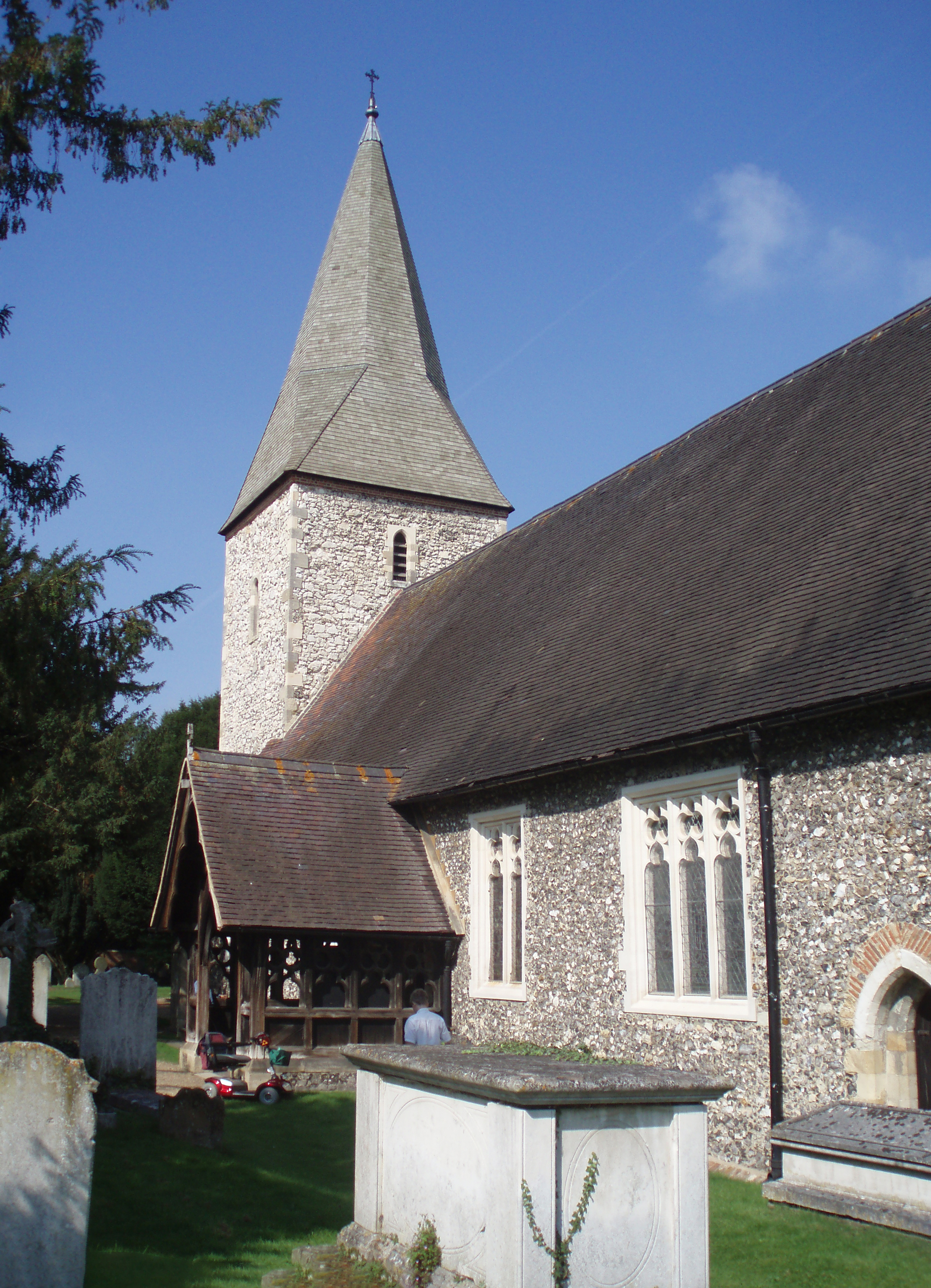
St Peter & St Andrew's Church

The parish of Old Windsor contains one Church of England church: the parish Church of St Peter and St Andrew. The Parish Church was probably built on the site of a chapel attached to the hunting lodge of Edward the Confessor. After the original building was destroyed by French soldiers, the church was rebuilt in 1218. In 1865, an extensive restoration plan was carried out by Giles Gilbert Scott which included the removal of a porch which had been added onto the building during the Georgian period. A spire was also built to replace the cupola, and three bells were added to the original five, dating from 1775.

On Easter Day 2008, the church suffered a serious fire, but has since been restored. The original church of St Luke was built in 1867, but after falling into disrepair, was replaced by a newer building in the 1960s. The building was sold in 2023 as it was no longer needed for worship. The church contains a carpet which was bought in 1960 from Westminster Abbey, where it had been used during the coronation. A chapel at Beaumont is said to be the inspiration for the chapel in Evelyn Waugh's Brideshead Revisited. Waugh spent time in Windsor, whilst in the armed forces.

== Amenities ==
=== Pubs ===
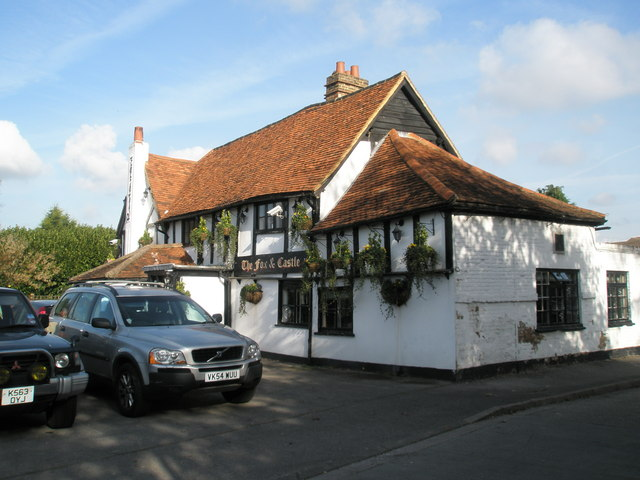
The Fox and Castle at Old Windsor

Old Windsor is home to five pubs: the Bells of Ouzeley, the Fox and Castle, The Loch and The Tyne, the Toby Carvery, and the Union Inn; and one members club, The Old Windsor Club. There are also a small number of local shops and several restaurants.

=== Schools ===
Old Windsor is home to two state schools – King's Court First School and St Peter's Church of England Middle School – and St John's Beaumont independent school. St John's Beaumont was opened in 1888, originally a preparatory school for the Jesuit public school, Beaumont College, which was also situated in Old Windsor. Beaumont College was closed in 1967.

== The Great Park ==
Windsor Great Park is largely within the bounds of Old Windsor, including both the Royal and Cumberland Lodges.

== Famous people ==
Old Windsor is, or has been, the home of several famous people, including:

- Sir Elton John, who lives at Woodside on the edge of the Great Park
- Actress Geraldine McEwan, who was born in Old Windsor

== Location ==
Old Windsor lies on the south bank of the River Thames, 2.5 miles (4.0 km) southeast of the town of Windsor and 20 miles (32 km) west-southwest of London. It is near to the villages of Englefield Green and Datchet, and is connected by a towpath to Old Windsor Lock. The parish church lies on the edge of the village by the river, at the site of the original settlement.

=== Transport links ===
Old Windsor is approximately 5 minutes' drive from Windsor and 20 minutes from London Heathrow Airport, and is near to the M4 and M25 motorways. The nearest railway station is at Datchet, just under 3 miles (5 km) away.
