= Glen Island (Thames) =

Area of land in London, United Kingdom

Coordinates: 51.5318°N 0.6984°W

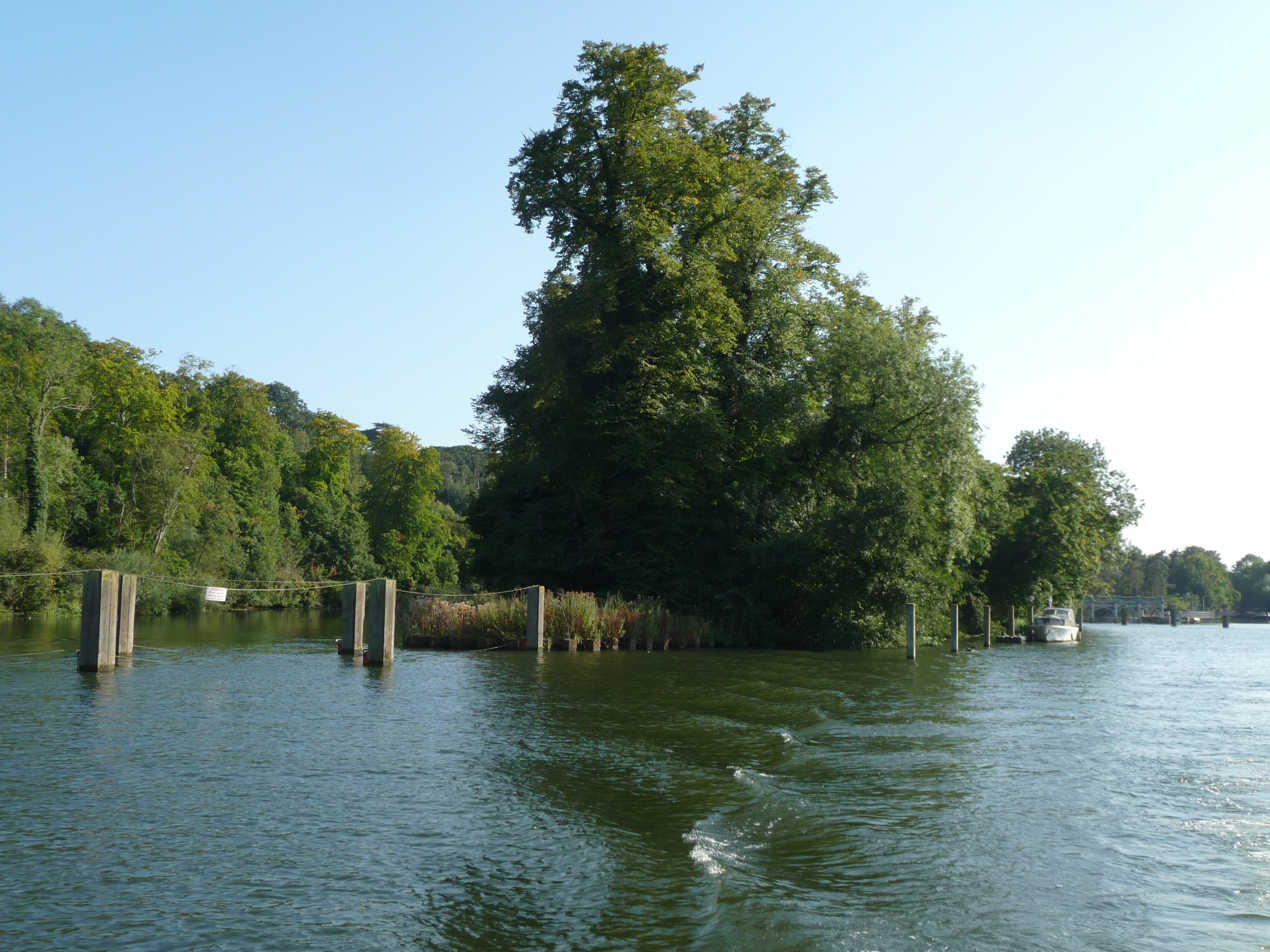
Head of Glen Island with the Jubilee River to the left

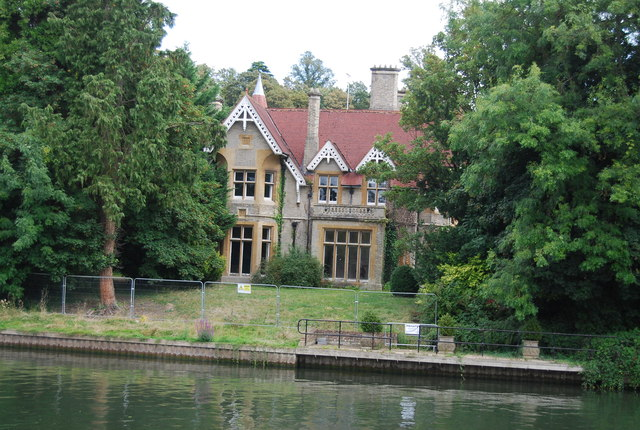
Glen Island House, Taplow

Glen Island is a large area of land between the head of the Jubilee River and the River Thames at Boulter's Lock near Maidenhead.

The Grade II listed Glen Island House, a riverside Gentleman's residence (now offices for a paper mill), was built in 1869 for Lt. Gen. Sir Roger Palmer, 5th Baronet. (d.1910), an Irish landowner who took part in the Charge of the Light Brigade.

Since 2018, Glen Island has been linked to Ray Mill Island, and hence the Berkshire bank of the River Thames, by the Taplow Footbridge. This was commissioned by Berkeley Homes, who were creating a residential development that occupied the former Taplow Paper Mills site at Glen Island.

== See also ==
- Islands in the River Thames

Next island upstream	River Thames	Next island downstream
Bavin's Gulls	Glen Island	Boulter's Island
