= Taplow Bridge =

Footbridge over the River Thames, England

- Taplow Bridge viewed from Ray Mill Island and looking east towards Taplow
- Coordinates: 51°31′59.9″N 0°41′54.6″W
- Crosses: River Thames
- Locale: Between Maidenhead, Berkshire and Taplow, Buckinghamshire, England

Characteristics
- Design: Arch
- Material: Steel
- Total length: 35 metres (115 ft)
- No. of spans: 1

History
- Designer: Knight Architects / COWI
- Opened: 2018

Location
- Interactive map of Taplow Bridge

Taplow Bridge, sometimes called Taplow Footbridge, is a public footbridge over the River Thames between Maidenhead, Berkshire and Taplow, Buckinghamshire, England. It crosses the weir stream adjacent to Boulter's Lock, with the Berkshire bridgehead actually on Ray Mill Island. Pre-existing bridges provide access to Boulter's Island and hence to the mainland.

The bridge was commissioned by Berkeley Homes, who were creating a residential development that occupied the former Taplow Paper Mills site at Glen Island on the Taplow bank of the river. The bridge gives access from that development to the complex of the lock and adjacent restaurant, as well as the Victorian pleasure gardens and a small cafe on Ray Mill Island.

The bridge was designed by Knight Architects and the structural engineers were COWI. It opened to public use in 2018, with an official opening by Theresa May on the 2nd of November of that year. It won the Chilterns Buildings Design Awards in 2019. It has a single span, and a width of 35 metres (115 ft). It was fabricated off-site, and brought to site on a barge.

== See also ==
- List of crossings of the River Thames

Next bridge upstream	River Thames	Next bridge downstream
Cookham Bridge (road)	Taplow Bridge; Grid reference SU904824	Maidenhead Bridge (road)
