= Bavin's Gulls =

Island in the River Thames, England

Coordinates: 51°32′52″N 0°41′30″W

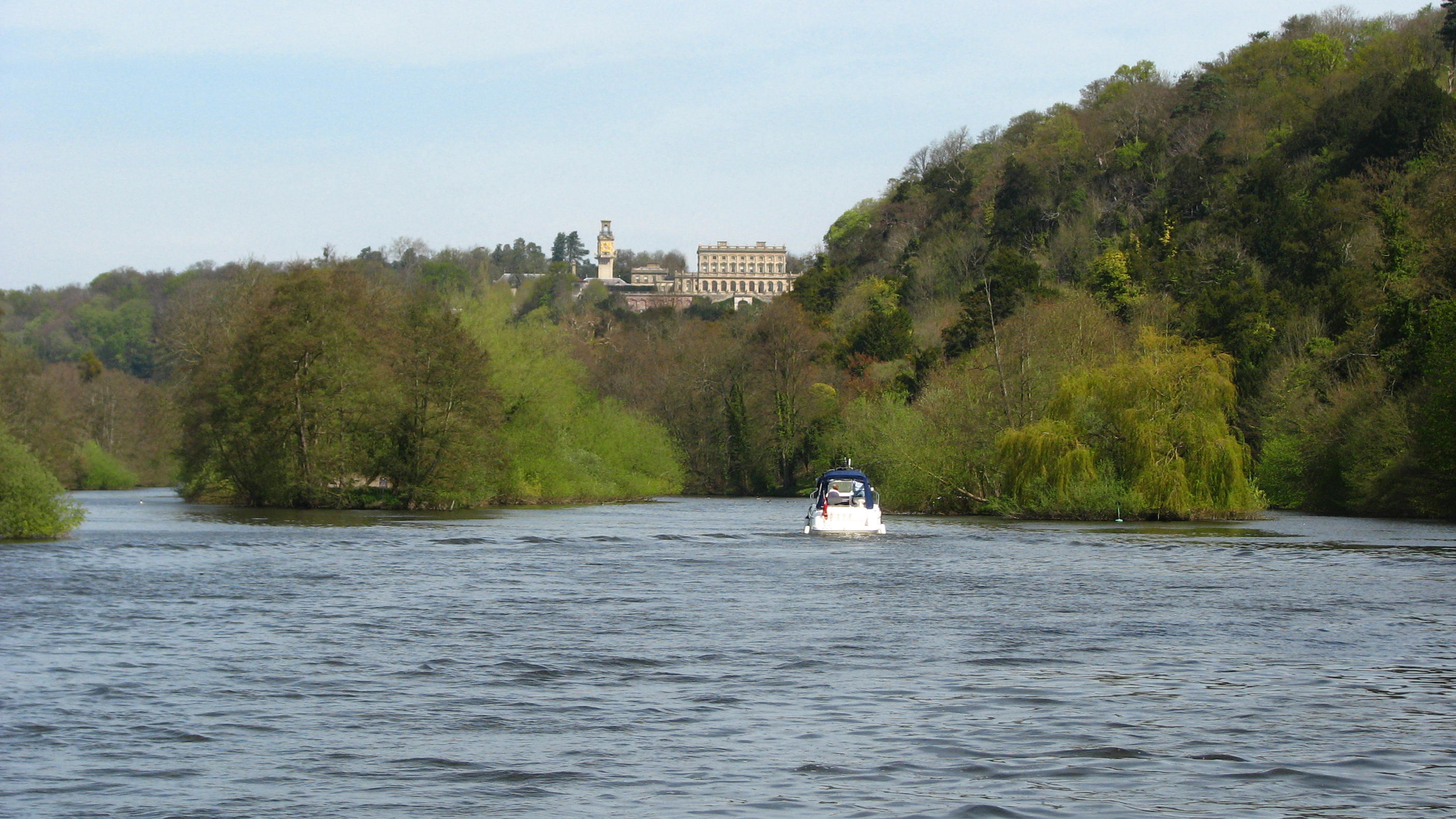
Bavin's Gulls looking upstream towards Cliveden House

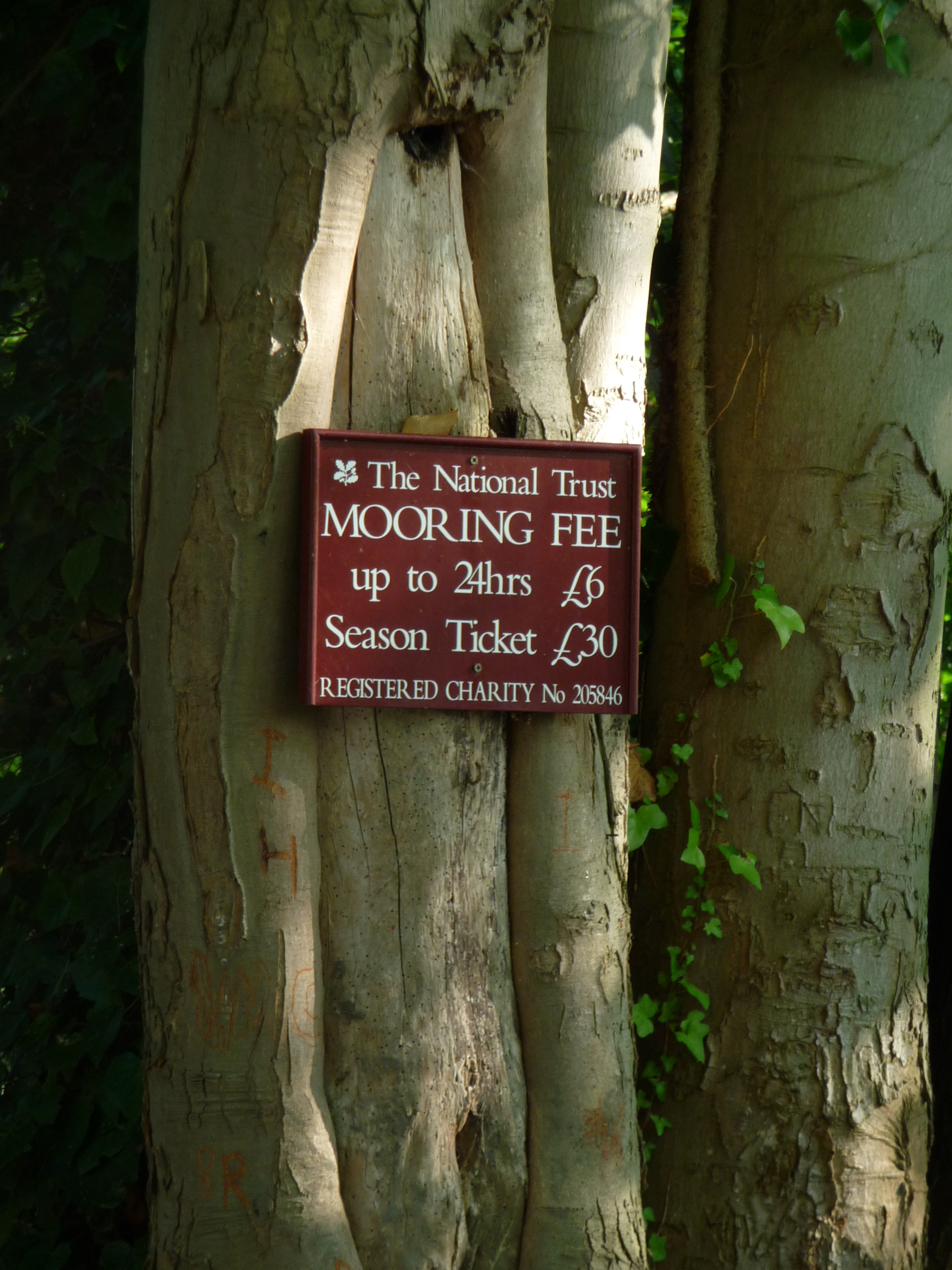
Notice of mooring fees on Bavin's Gulls, in 2008

Bavin's Gulls or Sloe Grove Islands are a group of islands in the River Thames in England on the reach known as Cliveden Deep above Boulter's Lock, near Maidenhead, Berkshire. This reach of the Thames was described by Jerome K. Jerome in Three Men in a Boat as "unbroken loveliness this is, perhaps, the sweetest stretch of all the river...".

Bavin's Gulls consists of two large and two small thin wooded strips; they are part of the Cliveden Estate and are owned by the National Trust. Overnight mooring is permitted on three of the islands but no mooring or landing is permitted on the fourth which is a nature reserve.

== See also ==
- Islands in the River Thames

Next island upstream	River Thames	Next island downstream
Formosa Island	Bavin's Gulls	Glen Island
