= Ray Mill Island =

Island in the River Thames in Berkshire, England

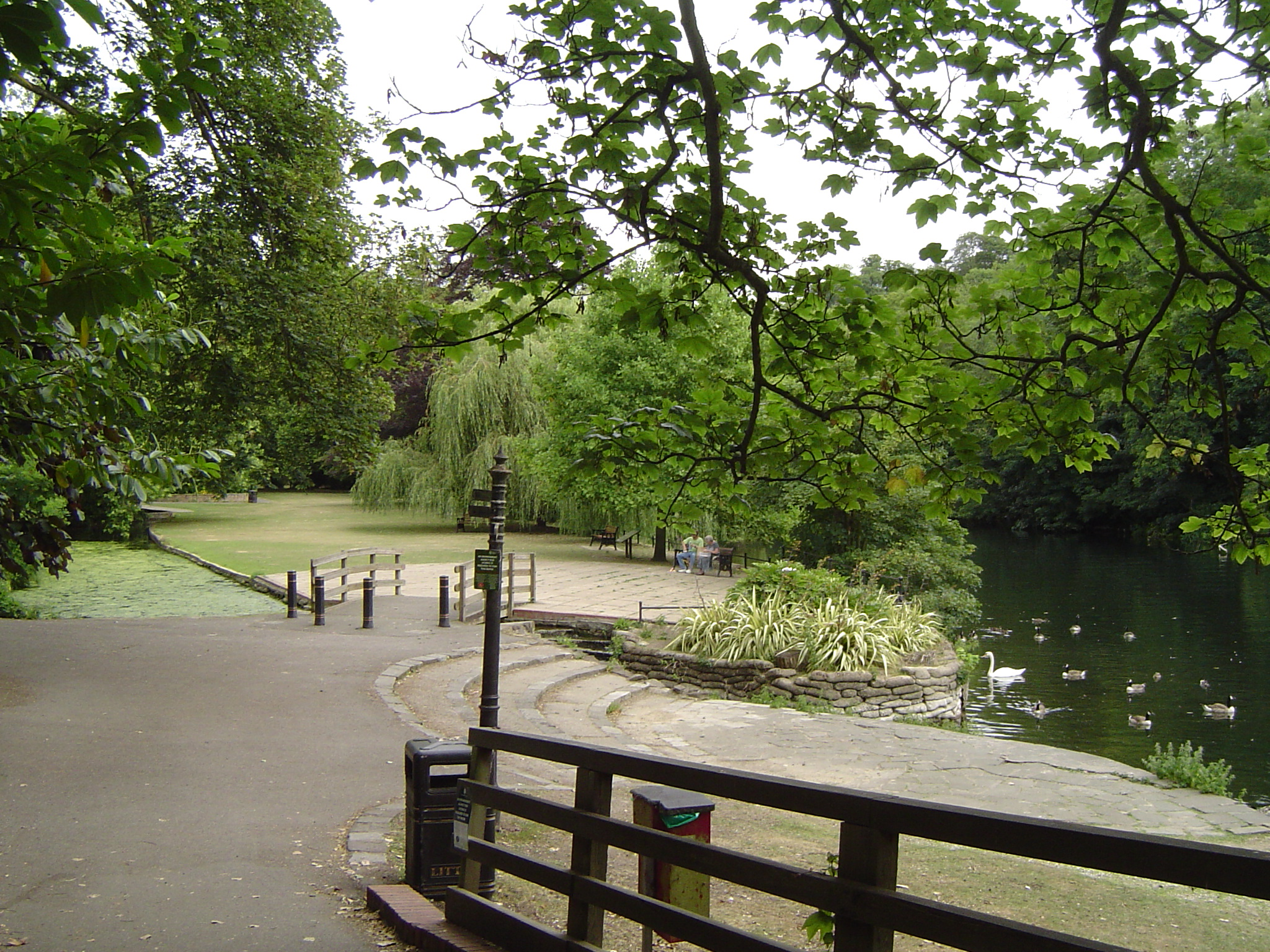
- Laid out gardens on Ray Mill Island

- Location within Berkshire
- Type: Public park on river island
- Location: Maidenhead, Berkshire, UK
- Coordinates: 51.5348°N 0.6986°W
- Area: 1.6 hectares (4.0 acres)

Ray Mill Island is an island in the River Thames in England at Boulter's Lock near Maidenhead, Berkshire.

Taplow Bridge and boat station seen from the island

Ray Mill Island is immediately to the east of Boulter's Island, separated by the former millstream, which is crossed by a footbridge. Boulter's Island is, in turn, accessible via Boulter's Bridge across the tail of Boulter's Lock. A much larger footbridge, the Taplow Bridge (opened in 2018), now links Ray Mill Island to Glen Island and Taplow on the Buckinghamshire side of the river.

The island is now a park administered by the Royal Borough of Windsor and Maidenhead and has an area of 1.6 hectares (4.0 acres). It is named after the Ray family who once had a flour mill here. The mill was constructed in 1726 on the site of a previous mill, and continued to produce flour until the 1920s. The site was acquired by the former Maidenhead Borough Council in 1950 from the Conservators of the River Thames.

The fish pond and fountain

There is a cafe and picnic area on the island, as well as public toilets. There is also an aviary and guinea pig enclosure, together with a fish pond and fountain. A boat hire station, in the weir stream adjacent to the island, rents out rowing boats and electric boats.

Boulter's Lock weir

Boulter's Lock weir runs from the top end of the island across to the east bank near Taplow. A kayak flume has been built adjacent to the weir on the island.

== Statues and Memorials ==
For over 20 years until it was stolen in October 2011, the island housed The Companion by Eunice Goodman, a memorial statue for four local schoolboys who died in a skiing accident. Although recovered, the statue was damaged beyond repair, and a new version was cast in bronze from the original mould. This was unveiled in its original location in July 2012.

Other works on the island include:

- Vintage Boys by Lydia Karpinska.
- Maiden with Swans by Eunice Goodman
- Berkshire SANDS Memorial Tree by Gavin Southgate

== See also ==
- Islands in the River Thames

Next island upstream	River Thames	Next island downstream
Boulter's Island	Ray Mill Island	Grass Eyot
