= Boulter's Island =

Island in the River Thames, England

Coordinates: 51.53329°N 0.69954°W

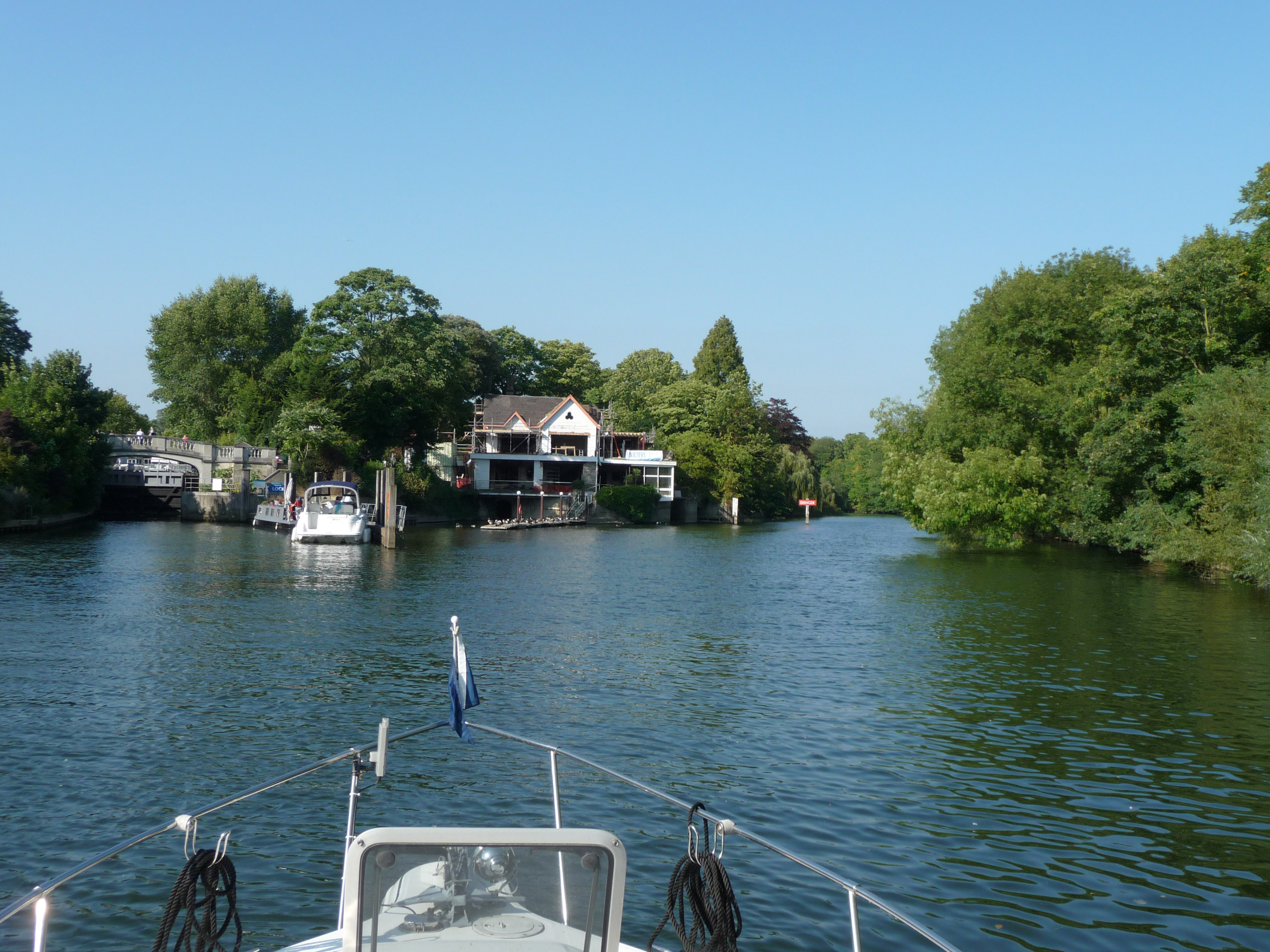
Tail of Boulter's Island with Boulter's Lock to the left

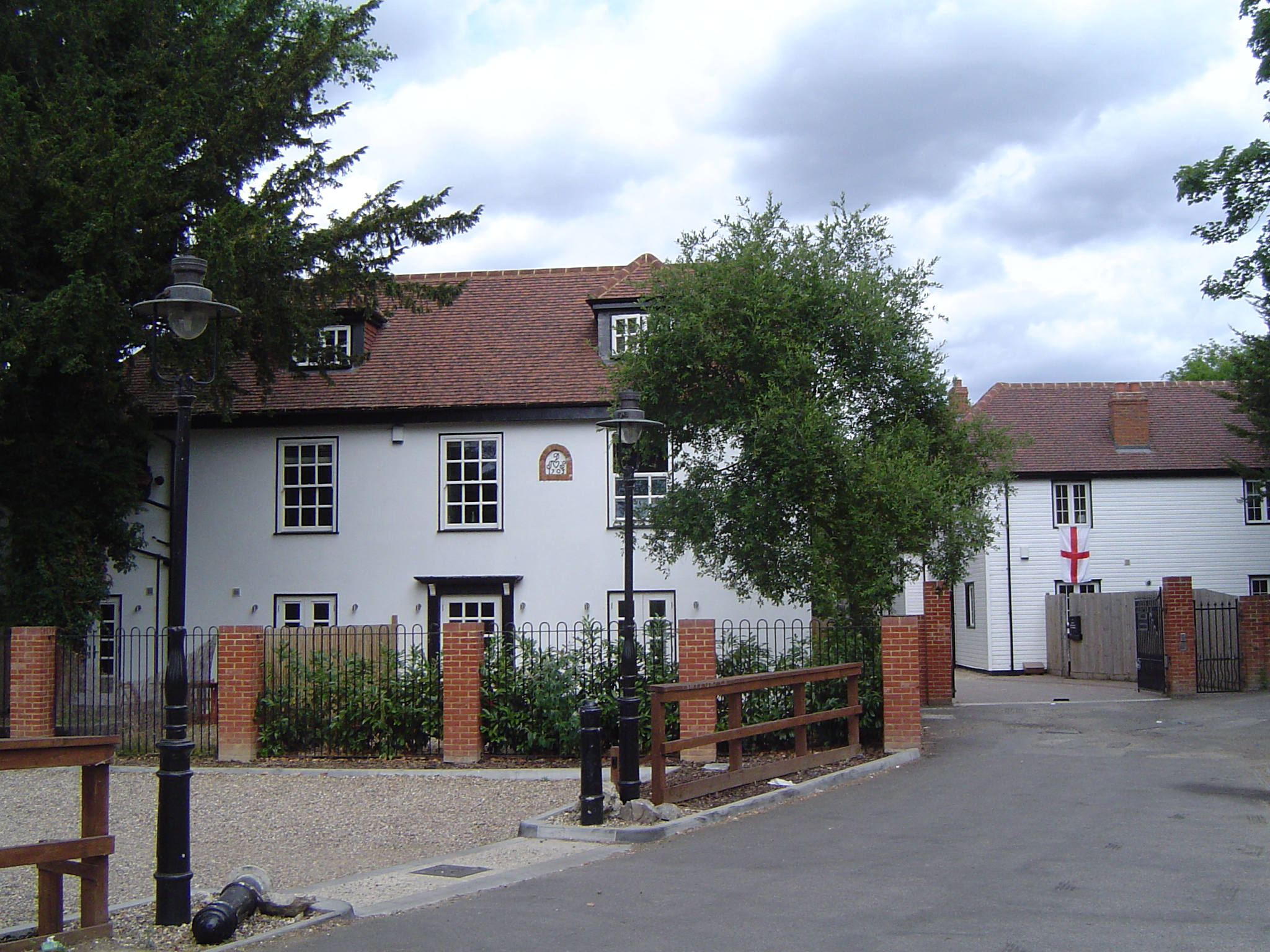
Houses on Boulter's Island

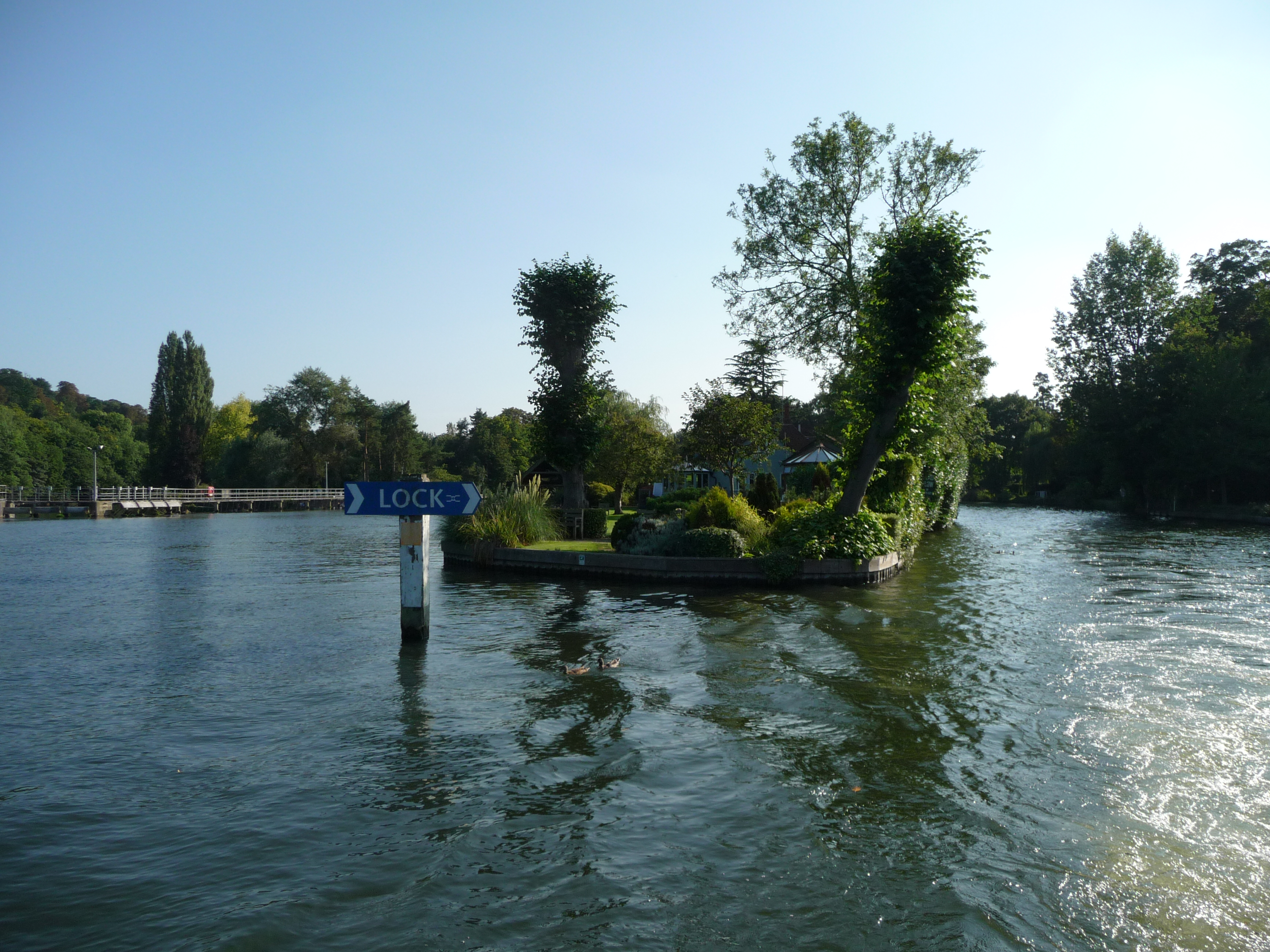
Head of Boulter's Island with Boulter's Lock Wier and the head of Ray Mill Island to the left

Boulter's Island is an island in the River Thames at Boulter's Lock, in the north-east suburbs of Maidenhead, Berkshire. It is next to the Maidenhead (west) bank, separated by the lock cut. Boulter's Island is accessible by motor vehicle via Boulter's Bridge across the tail of Boulter's Lock. The island has a number of private houses, a restaurant and a small boatyard with a slipway.

Ray Mill Island lies to the east of Boulter's Island and is a public park, separated from Boulter's Island by the Ray Mill Stream, which is bridged by a small footbridge. A much larger footbridge, the Taplow Bridge (opened in 2018), now links Ray Mill Island to Glen Island and Taplow on the Buckinghamshire side of the river.

Richard Dimbleby, the BBC broadcaster, lived for many years in a house on Boulter's Island.

== See also ==
- Islands in the River Thames

Next island upstream	River Thames	Next island downstream
Glen Island	Boulter's Island	Ray Mill Island
