= South Lodge Pit =

Protected area in Buckinghamshire, England

Coordinates: 51.529°N 0.6962°W

- Site of Special Scientific Interest
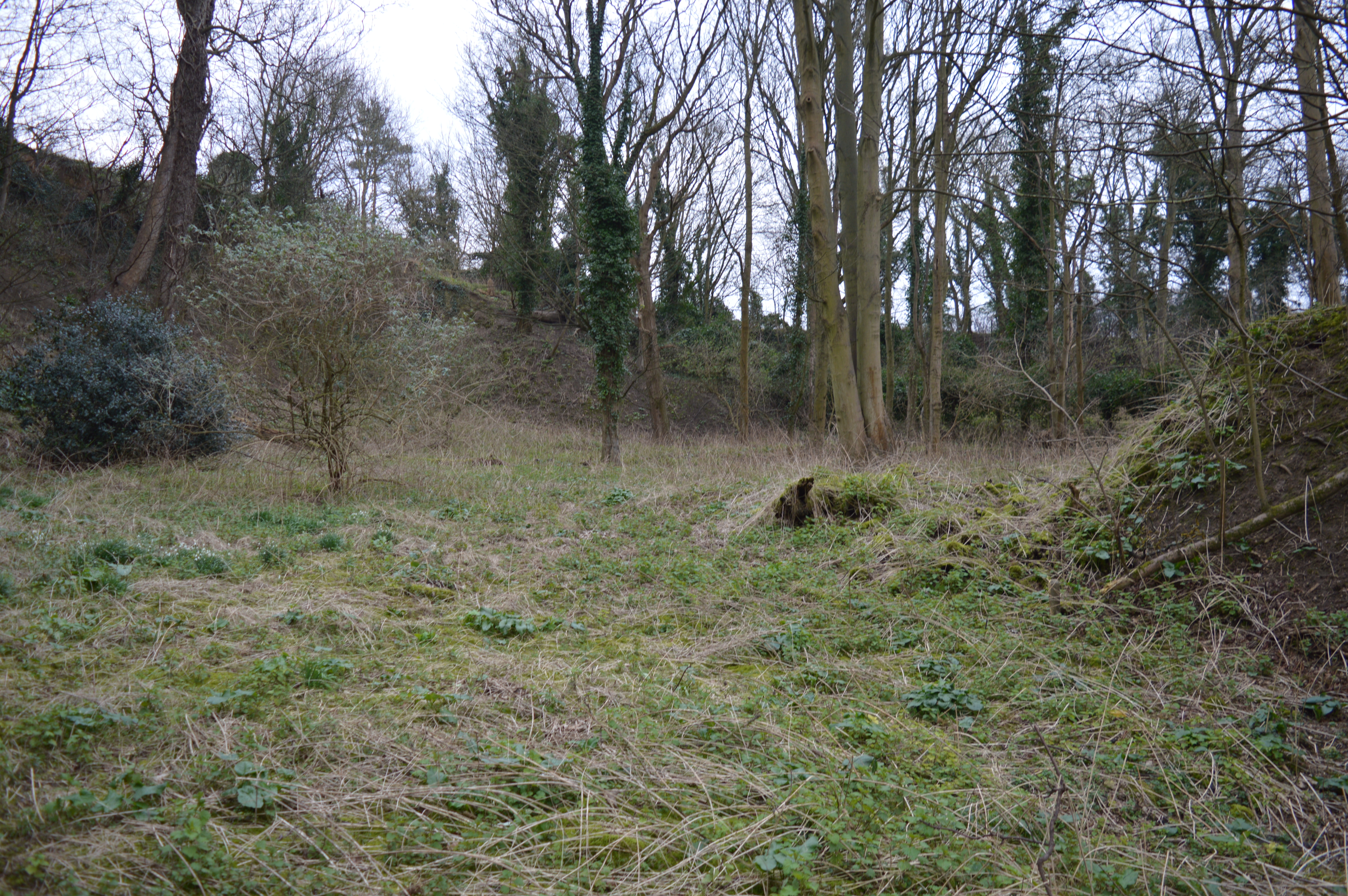
- Location of South Lodge Pit.
- Area of search: Buckinghamshire
- Grid reference: SU905819
- Interest: Geological
- Area: 0.5 ha (1.2 acres)
- Notification date: 1986
- Location map: Magic Map

South Lodge Pit is a 0.5-hectare (1.2-acre) geological Site of Special Scientific Interest in Taplow in Buckinghamshire. It is a Geological Conservation Review site.

This former chalk quarry dates to the late Cretaceous, around 83 million year ago. It is the only British example of a chalk phosphorite deposit, comparable to deposits in the Paris Basin. In the late Cretaceous sea levels were much higher and covered much of England, including Buckinghamshire. Marine fossils are found in several horizons, including annelids, oysters and bivalves.

The site is on private land with no public access.
