= Edward John Gregory =

English painter

Edward John Gregory RA
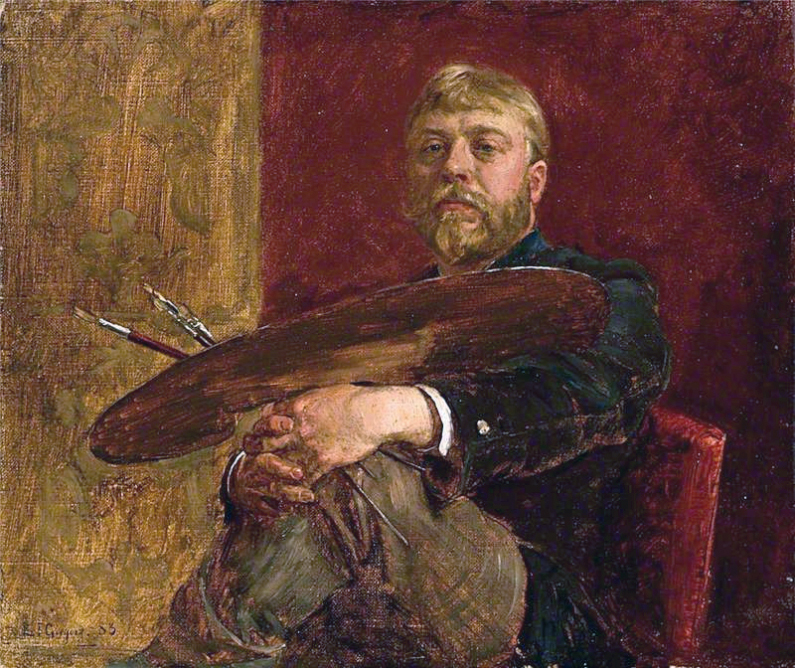
- Self-portrait, 1887, Tate Gallery
- Born: 19 April 1851; Southampton, England
- Died: 22 June 1909 (aged 59); Great Marlow, England
- Education: South Kensington Art School
- Known for: painting
- Movement: Hubert Herkomer; Robert Walker Macbeth; William Luson Thomas
- Spouse: Mary Joyner

Edward John Gregory RA, PPRBSA (19 April 1850 – 22 June 1909), was a British painter.

== Biography ==
Gregory was born in Southampton on 19 April 1850. He was grandson of John Gregory, engineer-in-chief of the auxiliary engines in Sir John Franklin's last Arctic expedition, and was eldest child (in a family of three sons and five daughters) of Edward Gregory, a ship's engineer, and Mary Ann Taylor.

On leaving Dr. Cruikshank's private school at fifteen he entered the drawing-office, in his native town, of the Peninsular and Oriental Steam Navigation Company, in whose employ his father sailed. He had set his mind upon being a painter. Making the acquaintance at Southampton of Hubert von Herkomer RA, whose family had settled there, he started a life-class with him.

In 1869, Gregory went to London, and with Herkomer joined the South Kensington Art School. Subsequently, he studied for a short time at the Royal Academy Schools. He was soon employed in the decorations of the Victoria and Albert Museum, and in 1871, with his friends Herkomer and Robert Walker Macbeth, began working for The Graphic, which had just been started by William Luson Thomas. Gregory at first contributed sketches from the theatre, but soon freely transcribed sketches sent home from the French army at the front by Mr. Sydney P. Hall.

In 1876 he married Mary Joyner, who survived him without issue. From 1909 until his death, Gregory was president of the Royal Birmingham Society of Artists. He died at his residence, Brampton House, Great Marlow, on 22 June 1909, and was buried in Great Marlow churchyard.

== Works ==
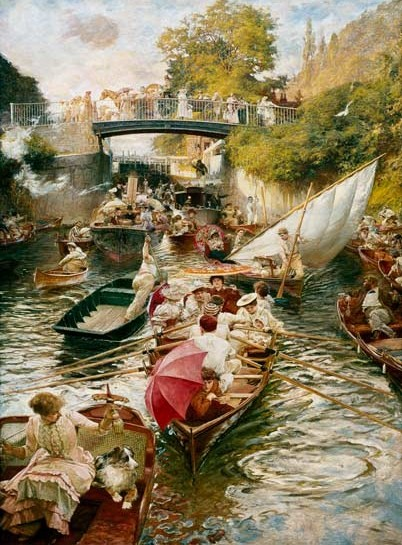
Boulter's Lock, Sunday Afternoon Lady Lever Art Gallery

Gregory's illustrations, which were sometimes signed by both himself and Hall, revealed the variety and ingenuity of his draughtsmanship. He ceased to work regularly for the Graphic about 1875.

Gregory was not a frequent exhibitor at Burlington House. He first made his mark as a painter with the oil painting Dawn (now in the possession of John Singer Sargent, R.A.), originally shown at Deschamps' gallery in 1879. Much of his best work appeared at the exhibitions of the Royal Institute of Painters in Water Colours, of which he was elected associate in 1871 and member in 1876. He succeeded Sir James Linton as president in 1898. From 1875 to 1882, his contributions to the Academy were mainly portraits, including that of Duncan McLaren MP, a replica of which is in the Scottish National Portrait Gallery. During his trip to Italy in 1882 he visited Capri and painted a beautiful picture of the Gardens of Augustus and Mount Solaro. As early as 1883, he was elected with Macbeth to the associateship, and he became academician in 1898, after the completion and exhibition of his Boulter's Lock: Sunday Afternoon, a work which hardly justified the years of elaboration spent upon it.
