= Boulter's Lock =

Lock and weir on the River Thames, England

Coordinates: 51.53329°N 0.69954°W

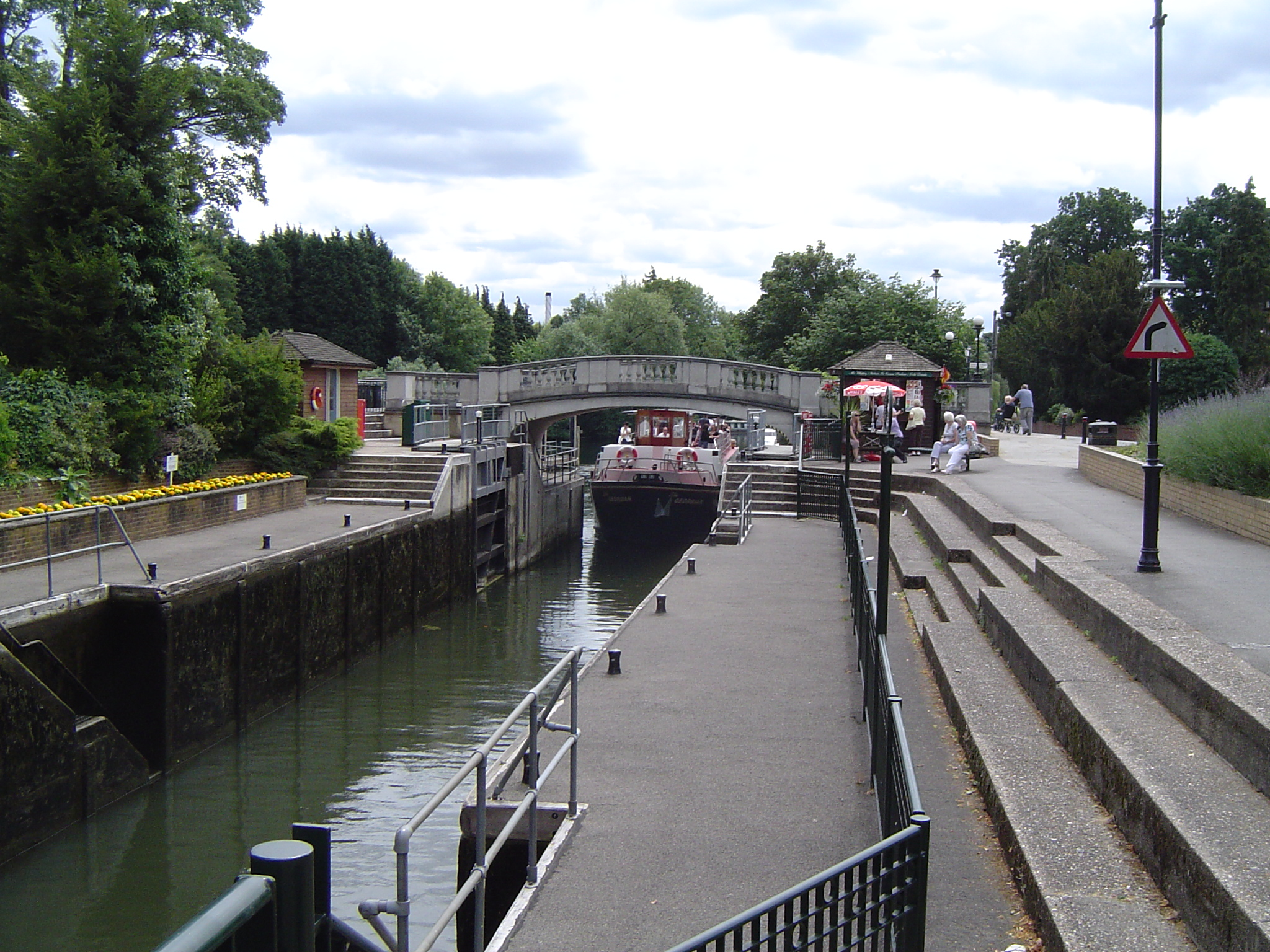
- Boulter's Lock as a pleasure boat squeezes in and under the bridge
- Interactive map of Boulter's Lock
- Waterway: River Thames
- County: Berkshire
- Maintained by: Environment Agency
- Operation: Hydraulic
- First built: 1772
- Latest built: 1912
- Length: 60.80 m (199 ft 6 in)
- Width: 6.47 m (21 ft 3 in)
- Fall: 2.39 m (7 ft 10 in)
- Above sea level: 77 feet (23 m)
- Distance to Teddington Lock: 31 miles (50 km)

Boulter's Lock is a lock and weir on the River Thames in England north-east of Maidenhead town centre, Berkshire. The present 1912-built lock replaces those at this point of the river to the immediate east dating from the late 16th century and that of 1772 built by the Thames Navigation Commission. The lock is on the western side of the north–south flowing reach between the A4094 Maidenhead to Cookham road and Ray Mill Island. The name is variably used for the immediate surrounding area.

The weir is some way upstream of the lock, at the northern end of Ray Mill Island. It is one of the most popular whitewater freestyle kayaking areas on the River Thames, as it has been modified to allow kayakers to use it without causing disruption to other river users.

== History ==
The earliest reference to a flash lock is in the late 16th century, although a mill is known to have existed here in the 14th century. The flash lock was located in what is now the main weir, with a winch to haul barges through on the west bank near the tip of Boulter's Island. In 1746 it was written that there was no (extant) lock further downstream on the Thames. The Thames and Isis Navigation Act 1771 (11 Geo. 3. c. 45) obtained on 29 April 1771 did not allow the Thames Navigation Commission to build locks below Maidenhead Bridge, so the lock built here in 1772 was the furthest downstream of the eight first built by the commission. The lock was timber-sided, and the work was overseen by Joseph Nickalls, who had designed a scheme of improvements to the river from Abingdon to Richmond, in preparation for obtaining the act of parliament. Originally the lock was on the Taplow side, close to Taplow Mill. It was referred to as Boltus lock or Bolters lock. A "bolter" was a miller and referred to the mill of Taplow. In 1773 a resident landowner complained of trespass in his woods by barge crews who "very much misbehaved themselves by their indecent conversation and horrid oaths and imprecations." Its prototype lock-keeper's house was built here in 1774. By 1780 the lock was reported as being in as bad a state as Marlow, and in 1795 Phillips Inland Navigation complained of the deep hole and subsequent shoals caused by the force of water.

In 1825 the City of London Corporation complained regarding condition and recommended it be rebuilt on the Berkshire side of the river. This involved excavating a 600-yard (550 m) lock cut. For drainage during construction, a waterwheel was placed in the weir, which was used to operate pumps. The contract to dig was given to George Gynell, at a cost of £1,630. A separate contract for the masonry and millwright's work was given to Clarke and Moss, while carpentry and general labouring was done by men employed directly by the commission. Stone was obtained from Headington Quarry near Oxford. Because of the distance from the fall below to the lock, a separate 6 hp (4.5 kW) steam engine was used in operation post-building to pump out (lower) the lock chamber. The project was managed by George Treacher, with work beginning in December 1827 and finishing in April 1829. The total cost of the work was £11,800 When completed, the lock's volume – 151 by 19 feet (46.0 by 5.8 m) length with a fall of 6 feet (1.8 m) plus depth of 5 feet (1.5 m) over the sills—was the largest of a pound lock with masonry walls on English river navigations. In recognition of his work, Treacher was awarded £100 by the Commission in June 1829. The new lock was known as Ray Mill pound after Ray Mill Island next to it. The lock cut created Boulter's Island.

This part of the river became popular for boating parties in the late 19th century and early 20th century, as portrayed in a painting by Edward John Gregory. The lock was a popular place to visit on the Sunday after Royal Ascot when the wealthy and famous passed through the lock, some on their way to Cliveden. In 1899 an iron railing was placed round the lock to keep spectators at bay. In 1909 the Thames Conservancy purchased Ray Mill Island to provide for expansion of the lock, and it was rebuilt in 1912.

Congestion at the lock was a serious problem before World War I, and a novel solution was employed to reduce it. A moving ramp, consisting of wooden slats with chocks to prevent rowing boats from rolling over, was constructed to bypass the lock. The ramp was similar to an escalator, and small boats simply rowed towards it, and were carried up to the higher level while the occupants remained seated in their boat. The boat lift opened in 1909, and was powered by an electric motor. The date of its demise is uncertain, but its location on Ray Mill island can still be visited.

The salmon ladder opened at Boulters Weir on 19 May 2000 by the Duke of Wellington was the last of a series built on the Thames. The last salmon caught at the weir was landed on 5 August 1993. It is to this day the largest salmon in recorded history caught on the non-tidal River Thames and weighed 14lb's, measuring 97 cm's in length.

== Access ==
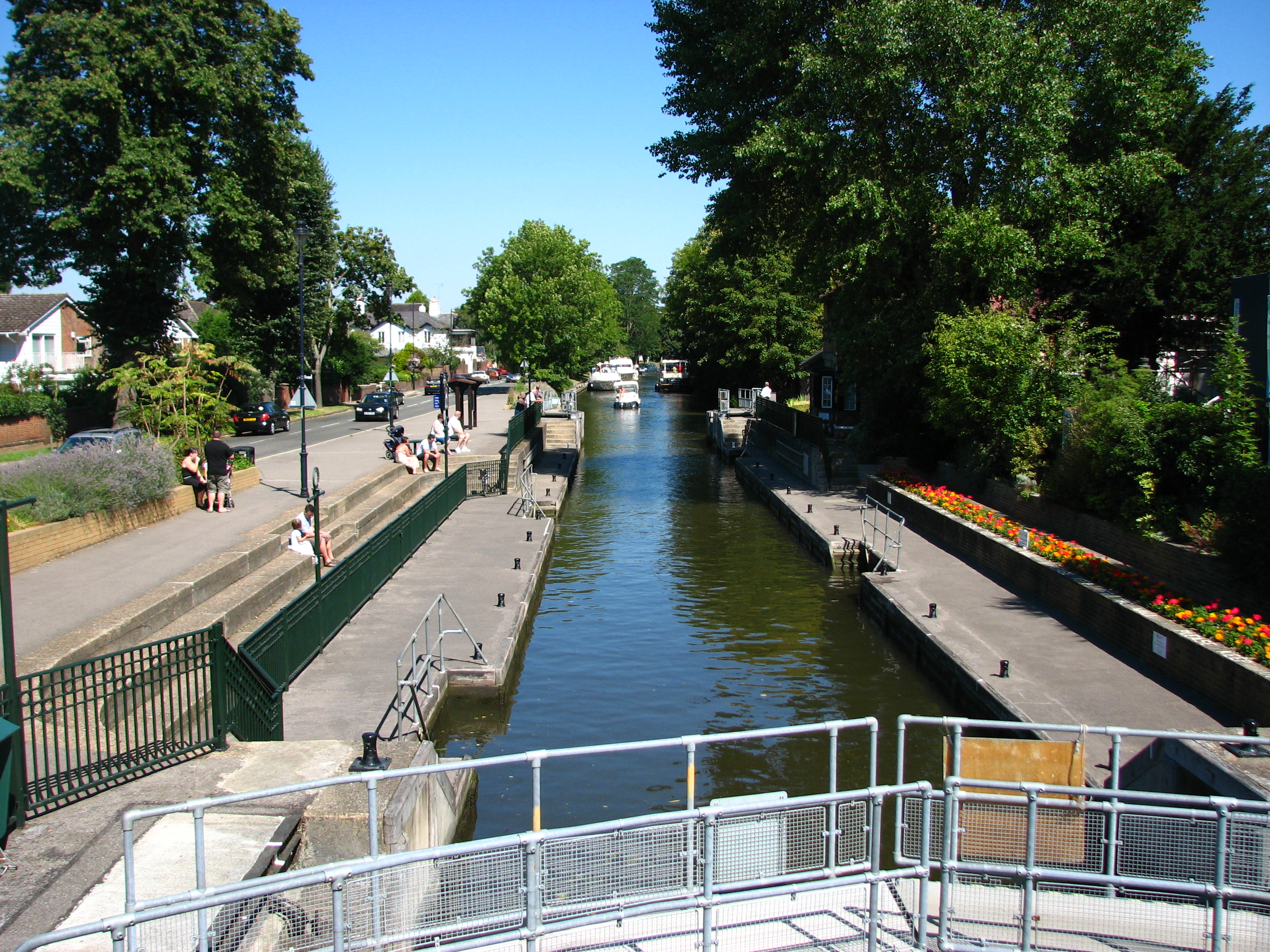
Boulter's Lock looking upstream with the top gates open

Ray Mead road/Lower Cookham road (A4094) runs alongside the lock. There is a public car park about 100m north of the lock. A track runs onto the lock island. An hourly bus route to the lock from Maidenhead town centre is run by Courtney Coaches.

The lock island is also accessible by the Taplow Bridge, a footbridge opened in 2018 that spans the weir stream from the Buckinghamshire bank of the river in Taplow.

== Reach above the lock ==
After the long cut beside the islands the reach opens out at the head of the Jubilee River on the east bank. This is followed by Bavin's Gulls on Cliveden Deep with landscaped hanging beech woods on the escarpment above which hosts Cliveden, a grandiose mansion run by a visitors' and public hire charity which was in the 20th century a forum for a prominent set of individuals and scene of the John Profumo affair. The river then curves round to Formosa Island and the other islands where Cookham Lock has been built.

The Thames Path follows the western (Maidenhead) bank upstream along Cliveden Reach until it cuts into Cookham village, missing Cookham Lock. The path rejoins the Thames near Cookham church. There was originally a towpath ferry (My Lady ferry or Lower Cliveden ferry) crossing to Cliveden and an Upper Cliveden ferry crossing back to Cookham lock island.

== Kayaking ==
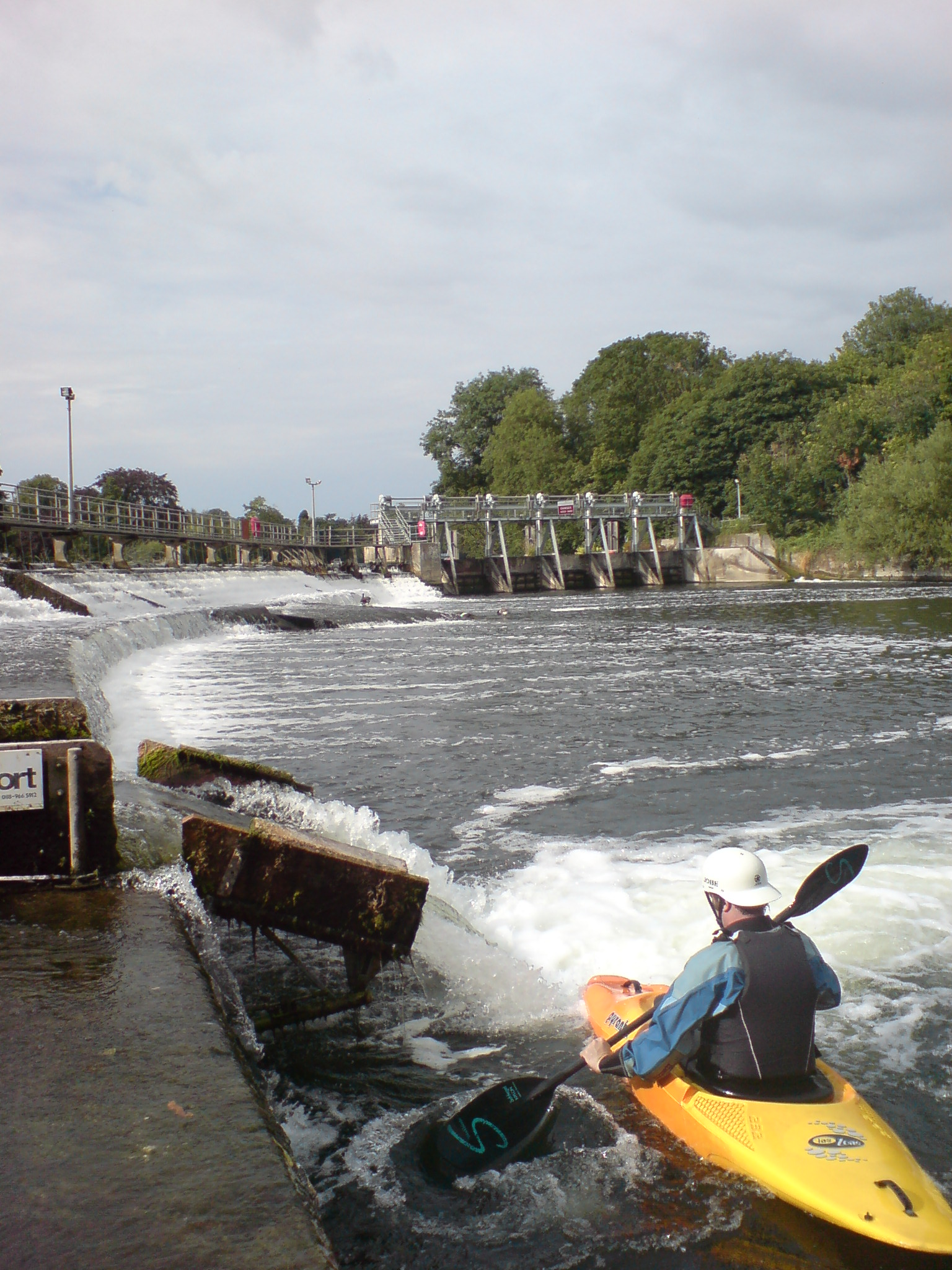
Kayaker by the weir flume, during the summer season

The weir at Boulter's Lock is a popular kayaking site. A canoe/kayak flume is installed during each summer to add to a permanent fixed ramp in front of the third of the weir's six gates.

== Literature and the media ==
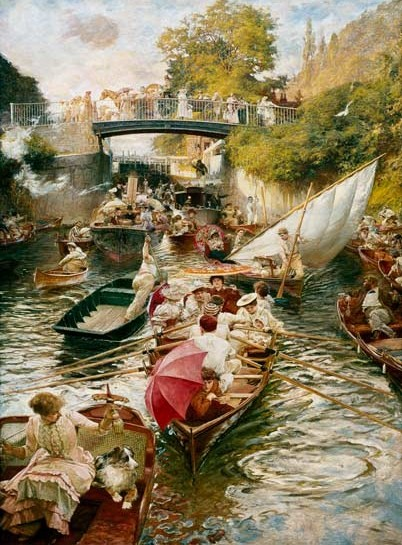
Boulter's Lock, Sunday Afternoon by Edward John Gregory (Lady Lever Art Gallery)

One of the best known works of the artist Edward John Gregory (1850–1909) is his Boulter's Lock, Sunday afternoon.

Nicholas Pocock, the marine artist, lived at 'Ray Lodge' and broadcaster Richard Dimbleby had a house on Boulter's Island.

Author John O'Farrell, grew up in 'The Weir House' opposite.

The Mr Bean episode Tee Off Mr Bean was recorded in a miniature golf course next to Boulter's Lock.

== See also ==
- Locks on the River Thames

Next lock upstream	River Thames	Next lock downstream
Cookham Lock; 3.35 km (2.08 mi)	Boulter's Lock; Grid reference: SU903824	Bray Lock; 3.43 km (2.13 mi)

== Bibliography ==
- McKnight, Hugh (1981). The Shell Book of Inland Waterways. David and Charles. ISBN 978-0-7153-8239-4.
- Skempton, Alec (1996). Civil Engineers and Engineering in Britain, 1600-1830. Variorum. ISBN 978-0-86078-578-1.
- Thacker, Fred S (1968) [1920]. The Thames Highway: Volume II Locks and Weirs. David & Charles. ISBN 978-0-7153-4233-6.
