= Maidenhead =

Market town in Berkshire, England

Coordinates: 51°31′23″N 0°43′19″W

- Market town
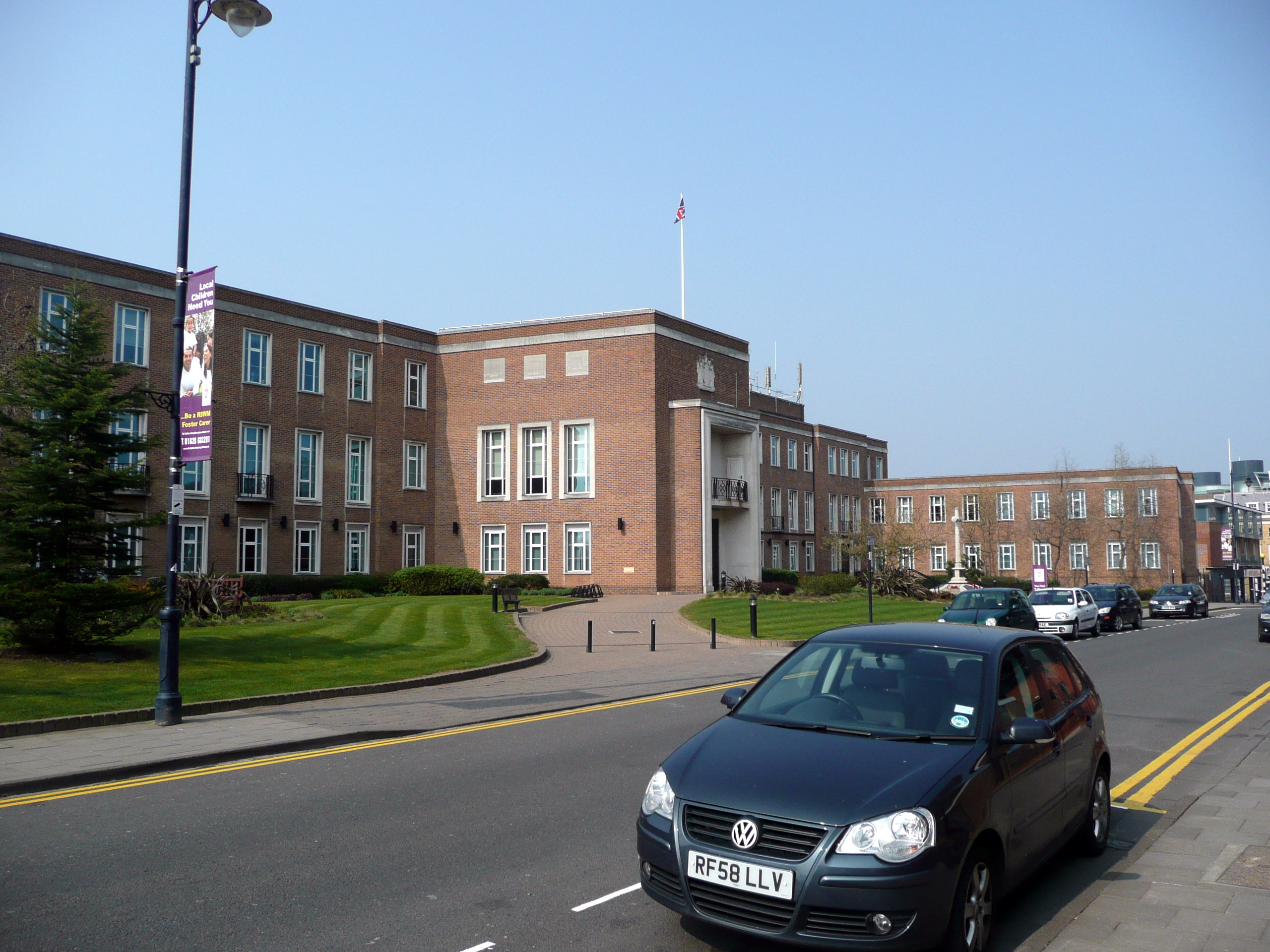
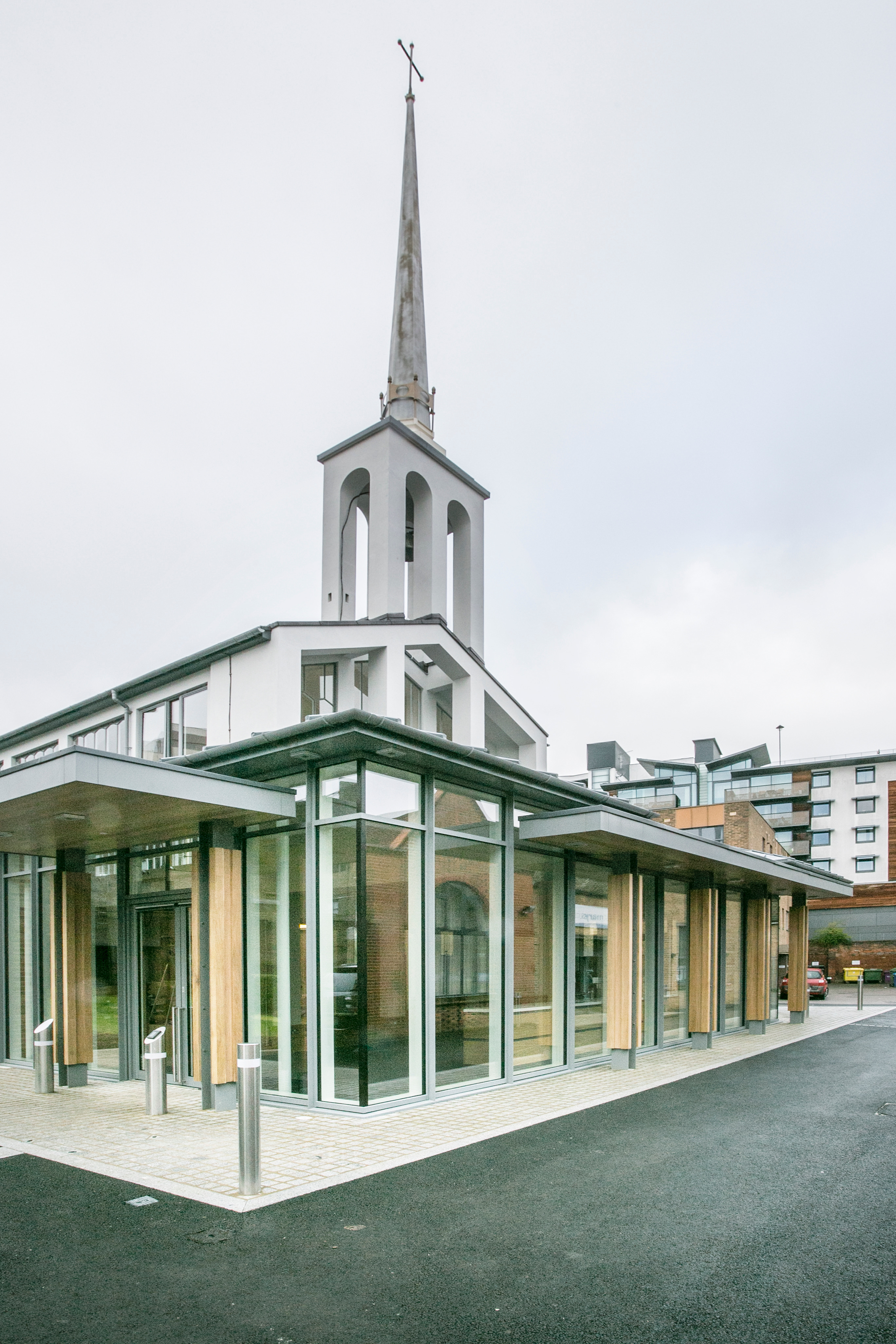
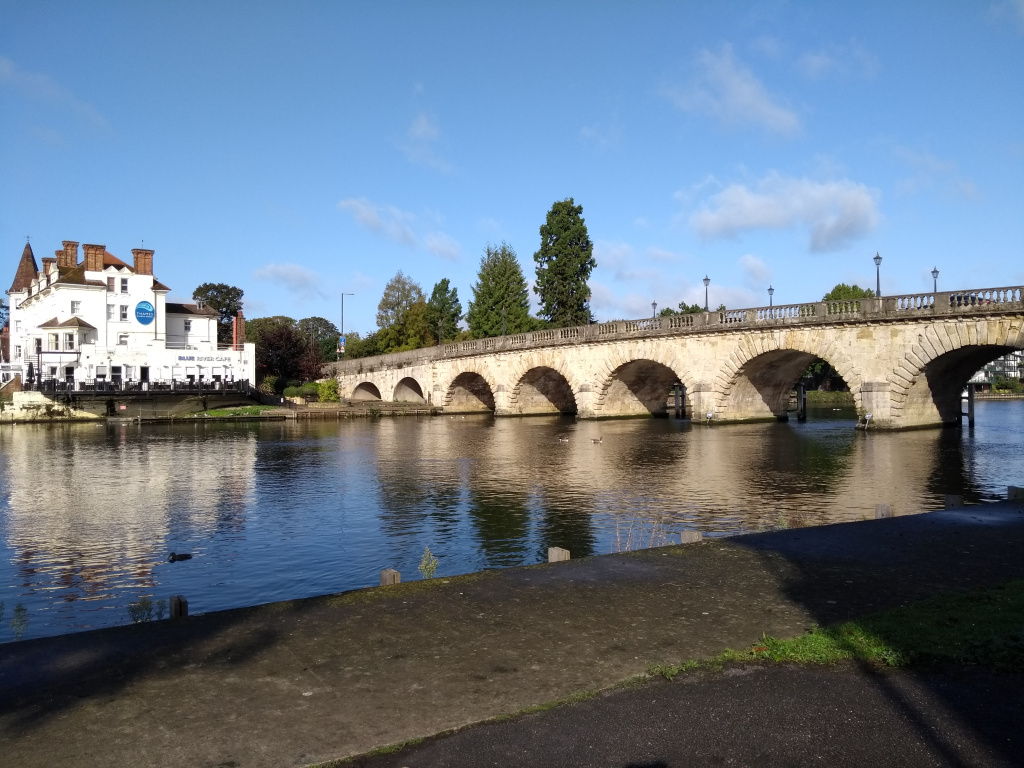
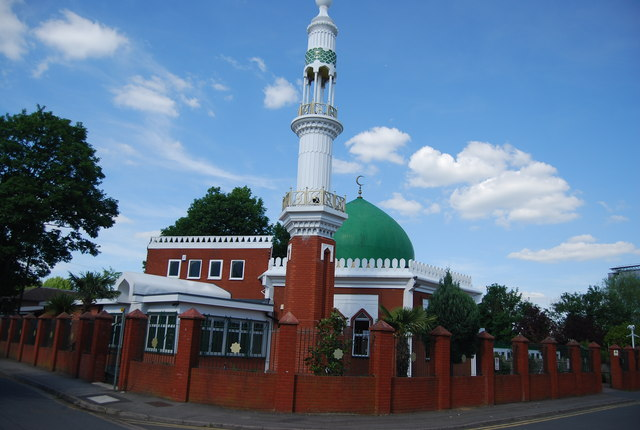
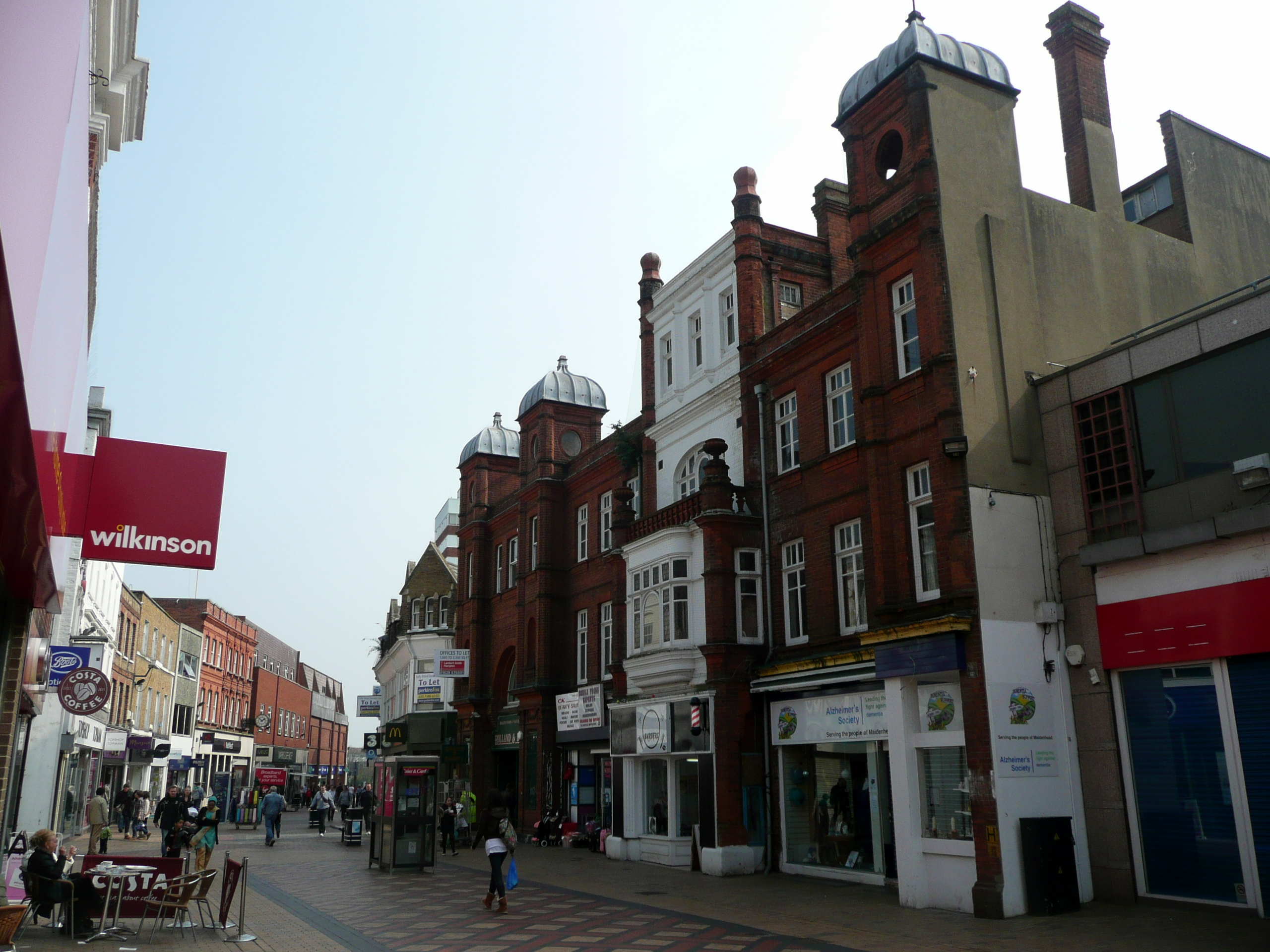
- Clockwise from top: Maidenhead town hall, bridge on the River Thames, High Street, mosque and St Mary's church

- Location within Berkshire
- Population: 67,375 (Built-up area, 2021)
- OS grid reference: SU887812
  - London: 30 mi (48 km)
- Unitary authority: Windsor and Maidenhead
- Ceremonial county: Berkshire
- Region: South East
- Country: England
- Sovereign state: United Kingdom
- Areas of the town: List: Altwood; Boyn Hill; Bray (Village); Bray Wick; Furze Platt; Highway; Holyport (Village); North Town; Pinkneys Green; White Waltham (Village) (part)
- Post town: MAIDENHEAD
- Postcode district: SL6
- Dialling code: 01628
- Police: Thames Valley
- Fire: Royal Berkshire
- Ambulance: South Central
- UK Parliament: Maidenhead

Maidenhead is a market town in the Royal Borough of Windsor and Maidenhead in the county of Berkshire, England. It lies on the southwestern bank of the River Thames, which at this point forms the border with Buckinghamshire. In the 2021 Census, the Maidenhead built-up area had a population of 67,375. The town is 27 miles (43 km) west of Charing Cross, London and 13 miles (21 km) east-northeast of Reading.

== History ==
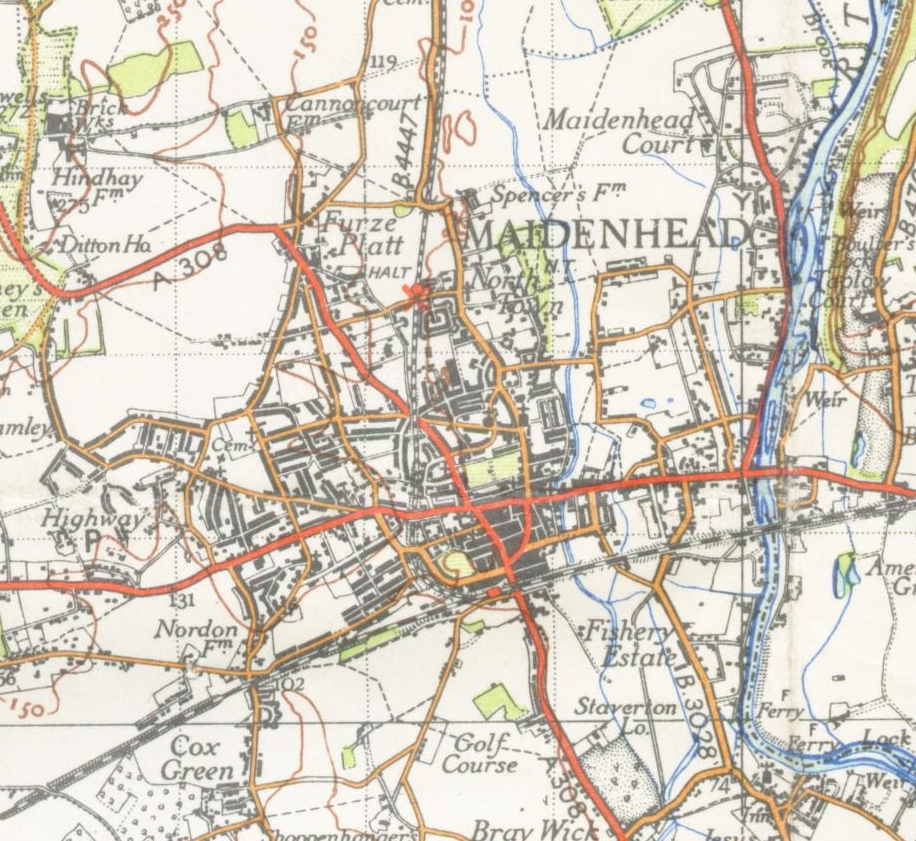
Map of Maidenhead from 1945

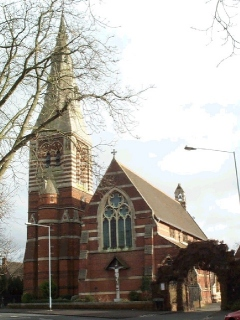
Classic Victorian architecture—All Saints' Church, Boyne Hill

The antiquary John Leland claimed that the area around Maidenhead's present town centre was a small Roman settlement called Alaunodunum. He stated that it had all but disappeared by the end of the Roman occupation. Although his source is unknown, there is documented and physical evidence of Roman settlement in the town. There are two well known villa sites in the town, one being in the suburb of Cox Green, and the other just west of the town centre on Castle Hill. This villa was situated on the route of the Camlet Way which was a Roman road linking Silchester (Calleva Atrebatum) and Colchester (Camulodunum) via St Albans (Verulamium) and passes through the present town centre. Remnants of the road have been unearthed at various locations nearby, but its exact route is unclear.

Maidenhead's name stems from the riverside area where the first "New wharf" or "Maiden Hythe" was built, as early as Saxon times. In the year 870, an army of Danes invaded the kingdom of Wessex. They disembarked from their longboats by the wharf and ferry crossing at Maidenhead and fought their way overland to Reading where they set up camp and made it their regional power base. The area of the present town centre was originally a small Anglo-Saxon town known as "South Ellington". The town would have likely developed on the Camlet Way on the site of Alaunodunum as the Bath Road was not re-routed until the 13th century. Maidenhead is recorded in the Domesday Book as the settlement of Ellington in the hundred of Beynhurst.

A wooden bridge was erected across the river in about 1280 to replace the ferry in South Ellington. The Great West Road to Reading, Gloucester and Bristol was diverted over the new bridge. Previously, it had kept to the north bank and crossed the Thames by ford at Cookham, and the medieval town, later to become Maidenhead grew up on the site of Alaunodunum and South Ellington, between the new bridge and the bottom of Castle Hill. Within a few years a new wharf was constructed next to the bridge to replace the old Saxon wharf which needed replacing. At this time, the South Ellington name was dropped with the town becoming known as Maidenhythe. The earliest record of this name change is in the Bray Court manorial rolls of 1296.

The new bridge and wharf led to the growth of medieval Maidenhead as a river port and market town. The present town was developed as a linear settlement in the 13th century along the newly diverted road with hostelries, a guildhall and a chapel dedicated to St Mary Magdalene was built in the middle of the road. The market was held outside the old guildhall which was set back from the High Street to form the market square. Maidenhead also became the first stopping point for coaches travelling from London to Gloucester and Bath and the town became populated with numerous inns. By the mid 18th century, Maidenhead was one of the busiest coaching towns in England with over ninety coaches a day passing through the town. The late 18th-century Bear Hotel on the High Street is the best of the town's old coaching inns surviving to this day.

King Charles I met his children for the last time before his execution in 1649 at the Greyhound Inn on the High Street, the site of which is now a branch of the NatWest Bank. A plaque commemorates their meeting. When the Great Western Railway came to the town, it began to expand. Muddy roads were replaced and public services were installed. The High Street began to change again, and substantial Victorian red brick architecture began to appear throughout the town. Maidenhead Citadel Corps of the Salvation Army was first opened in the town in the mid-1880s. Maidenhead Citadel Band was soon founded in 1886 by Bandmaster William Thomas, who later became mayor of the town. By Edwardian times, nearby Boulter's Lock became a favoured resort, especially on Ascot Sunday, and Skindles Hotel developed a reputation for illicit liaisons.

Although there are attractive residential and green areas in and around Maidenhead, the historic heart of the town has been redeveloped, primarily with office space, high technology company headquarters and apartments, making it one of the key business and commuter towns of the Silicon Corridor. This has happened in piecemeal fashion over the last forty years and Maidenhead town centre has lost most many historic buildings and much of its traditional English market town character. The High Street and Bridge Street areas only possess one heavily restored Medieval building and a handful of Georgian buildings in the Chapel Arches area.

Research by the New Economics Foundation in 2005 rated Maidenhead as an example of a clone town and the town centre is regarded as in need of improvement. In December 2007, the Royal Borough of Windsor and Maidenhead set up the Partnership for the Regeneration of Maidenhead (PRoM), which in October 2008 launched a comprehensive 20 Year Vision and Action Plan for rejuvenating the town centre. Launch of the plan coincided with confirmation by central government that Maidenhead will be part of the new Crossrail project.

== Governance ==
Maidenhead is in the unitary authority area of the Royal Borough of Windsor and Maidenhead, of which Maidenhead is the administrative centre. The main offices of the borough council are at Maidenhead Town Hall on St Ives Street, which was built as the headquarters of the former Maidenhead Borough Council in 1962.

Much of the Maidenhead urban area is unparished, but some outlying parts of the built-up area are included in civil parishes, notably at Cox Green to the south-west and Bray to the south.

The town of Maidenhead was formerly part of the Windsor and Maidenhead Parliament constituency, a Conservative safe seat. The Boundary Commission abolished this constituency for the 1997 general election since the electorate had become too large, splitting it into the new seats of Windsor and Maidenhead. The Maidenhead constituency includes rural parishes to the north, west and south of the town.

Maidenhead was held by the Conservatives at every election from its creation in 1997 until 2024. The former Prime Minister, Theresa May was elected MP in 1997 and represented Maidenhead until she stood down in 2024. The seat is now held by Joshua Reynolds of the Liberal Democrats.

=== Administrative history ===
Maidenhead was incorporated as a borough in 1582. The borough straddled the parishes of Bray and Cookham. It was reformed to become a municipal borough in 1836 under the Municipal Corporations Act 1835, which standardised how most boroughs operated across the country. The Local Government Act 1894 directed that parishes were no longer allowed to straddle borough boundaries, and so a parish called Maidenhead was created covering the same area as the borough, and the parishes of Bray and Cookham were reduced to just cover the areas outside the borough.

The municipal borough and parish of Maidenhead were abolished in 1974 under the Local Government Act 1972, becoming part of the borough of Windsor and Maidenhead (which was allowed to use the style 'royal borough' that had previously been used by Windsor). The Royal Borough of Windsor and Maidenhead became a unitary authority in 1998 when it took over the functions of the abolished Berkshire County Council.

== Geography ==
The Maidenhead urban area includes urban and suburban regions within the bounds of the town, called Maidenhead Court, North Town, Furze Platt, Pinkneys Green, Highway, Tittle Row, Boyn Hill, Fishery and Bray Wick; as well as adjoining built-up areas in surrounding civil parishes: Cox Green and Altwood in Cox Green parish, Woodlands Park in White Waltham parish, and part of Bray Wick in Bray parish. Bray village is linked to Maidenhead by the exclusive Fishery Estate which lies on the west bank of the Thames.

To the east, on the opposite side of the river from Maidenhead, is the large village of Taplow in Buckinghamshire which almost adjoins the suburban village of Burnham, which itself nearly adjoins the urban area of the large, industrial town of Slough. To the north are the Cookhams: Cookham Village, Cookham Rise and Cookham Dean. To the west is the area of Pinkneys Green. These lie south of the Berkshire-Buckinghamshire border, which is formed by the River Thames (which then bends southwards to form the Maidenhead-Taplow border). Adjoining Bray and Bray Wick to the south is the suburban village of Holyport. Continuing by road to the south-east leads to the historic, royal twin towns of Windsor and Eton.

Maidenhead lies immediately west of the Taplow ridge, a wooded spur of the Chilterns which rises dramatically above one of the most scenic stretches of the Thames. The ridge is crowned by the spectacular Cliveden House which can be seen from various parts of the town. Maidenhead has a site of Special Scientific Interest (SSSI) in the northern outskirts of the town called Cannoncourt Farm Pit, where the largest hand axe of the Paleolithic era in Britain was discovered. The town also has a local nature reserve called The Gullet. On 12 July 1901 Maidenhead entered the UK Weather Records with the highest 60-min total rainfall at 92 mm (3.6 in). As of January 2024, this record stands.

=== Built environment ===
Maidenhead has a long history of settlement, going back to the Anglo-Saxon and Roman periods. Despite this, there are no visible architectural remains in the present day town to show this.

== Demographics ==
As of the 2021 Census, the Maidenhead built-up area had a population of 67,375, making it a medium built-up area by the Office for National Statistics size classification. Its median age was 40.

== Economy ==
Maidenhead falls within the Slough and Heathrow travel to work area according to the 2011 classification, meaning that most people in Maidenhead stay within the town and the rest of the travel to work area for work.

== Landmarks ==
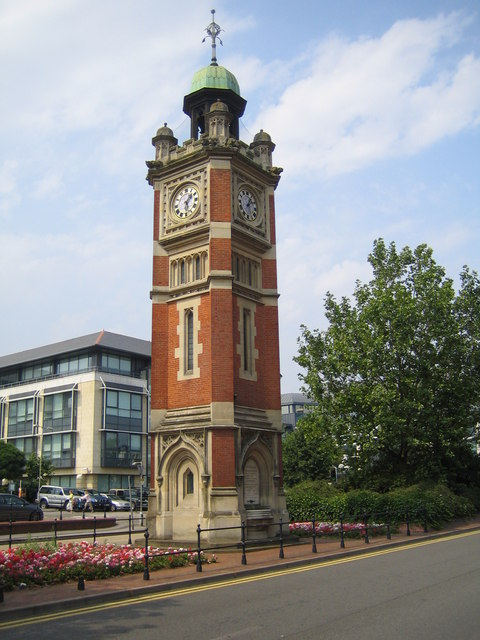
Maidenhead clock tower, outside the railway station

Maidenhead Bridge, a local landmark, dates from 1777 and was built at a cost of £19,000. It takes the A4 over the Thames to join Maidenhead to Taplow. All Saints' Church, Boyne Hill was completed in 1857 and is an early work by the architect G. E. Street. The church, consecrated on 2 December 1857 by Bishop Samuel Wilberforce, became the first ecclesiastical parish in the Borough of Maidenhead. Ten years later, in 1867, his brother William Wilberforce junior founded a Catholic chapel that led to St Joseph's Church. Maidenhead clock tower was built for Queen Victoria's diamond jubilee and stands outside the railway station. Boulter's Lock is a lock on the river Thames on the east side of Maidenhead, adjoining Ray Mill Island. The town has a number of statues which form part of a recognisable image of the town, including the 'Boy and the Boat' at the top end of the High Street, near the Methodist Church.

== Community facilities ==
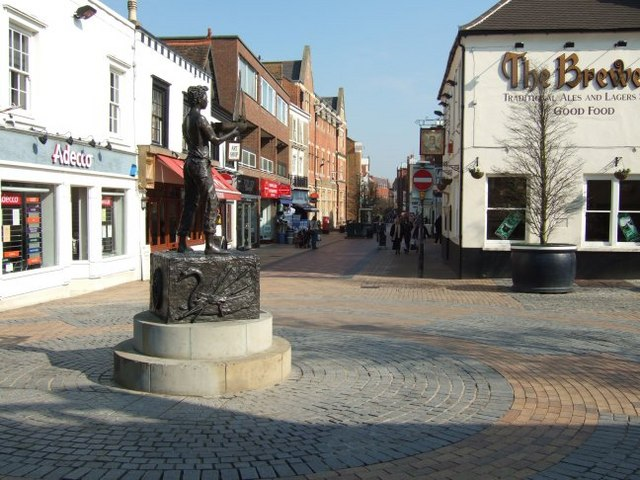
Maidenhead High Street

Maidenhead offers High Street shopping facilities The town also offers an eight-screen Odeon multiplex cinema. The local authority also provides a Shopmobility service, where those with physical disabilities can borrow mobility scooters to navigate around the town. Maidenhead Heritage Centre and Museum was established in 1993 and moved to permanent premises in a former pub in Park Street in 2006.

In the Boyne Hill area there is Norden Farm Centre for the Arts (an arts centre including a theatre). Waltham Place Estate on Church Hill is an 200-acre (80 ha) organic and biodynamic farm estate, with an ornamental garden, which is supported by the Campaign to Protect Rural England. The Reitlinger Open Space on Guards Club Road is named after Henry Reitlinger, a leading collector of fine art. On his death in 1950, the collection was vested in a trust, the Henry Reitlinger Bequest. The trustees were his adopted daughter, Mrs. M. Cocke, and a Maidenhead solicitor, who chose to house the collection at Oldfield House, now a private residence; the building dates back to 1892.

The Royal Borough of Windsor and Maidenhead has built a new leisure centre in the town to replace the outdated Magnet Leisure Centre, east of Kidwells Park. The new facility, Braywick Leisure Centre, opened in September 2020. The town also has various community centres, including 4 Marlow Road, a youth and community centre, to the side of Kidwells Park near the town centre. Various activities take place here, including scheduled youth drop-in times as well as classes in dance provided privately in its large sports and dance studios. There is a publicly open gym at Furze Platt school, in North Maidenhead.

== Transport ==
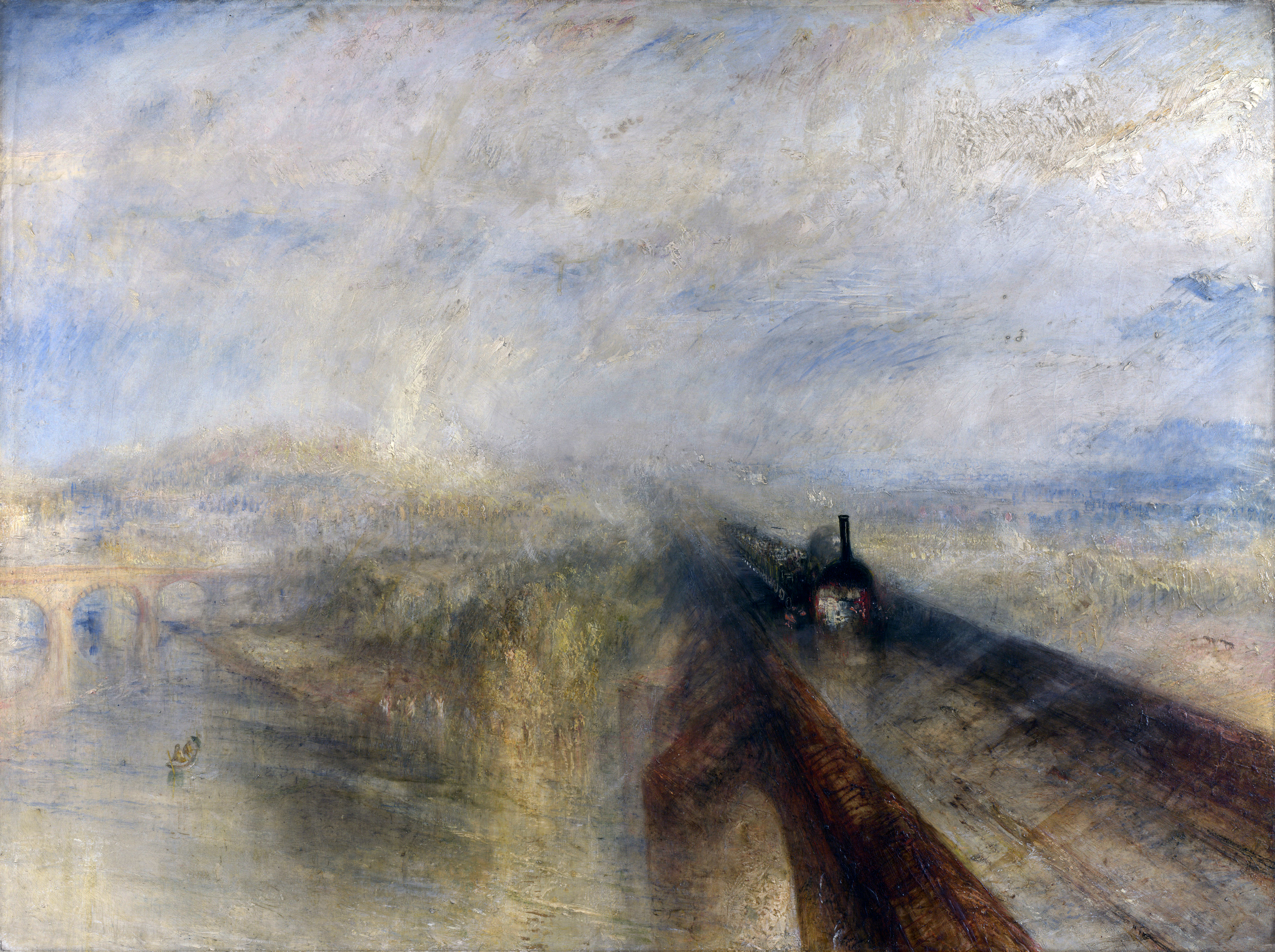
Rain, Steam and Speed – The Great Western Railway by J. M. W. Turner (1844) depicts an early locomotive of the Great Western Railway crossing the River Thames on Brunel's recently completed Maidenhead Railway Bridge.

The Brunel-built Great Western Main Line and the 21st-century Elizabeth line pass through the town, calling at Maidenhead station and offering direct services to London (Paddington and intermediate stations towards Liverpool Street, Shenfield, Canary Wharf and Abbey Wood), Reading, Didcot, and an hourly direct Sunday service to Swindon. The lines cross the Thames on Brunel's Maidenhead Railway Bridge (known locally as the Sounding Arch), famous for its flat brick arches. Maidenhead station is the beginning of the Marlow Branch Line from Maidenhead to Marlow, Buckinghamshire; Furze Platt railway station on this branch serves the northern area of Maidenhead. Rail services are operated by Great Western, and since 2022 TfL Rail have operated the Elizabeth Line through the Thames Valley.

Local bus services are provided by First Berkshire & The Thames Valley, Arriva Herts & Essex and Thames Valley Buses. The A4 runs through the town and crosses the Thames over Maidenhead Bridge. The town lies adjacent to junction 8/9 on the M4 motorway which is accessed via the A404(M) and A308(M). The A308(M), A404(M) and A404 form the Marlow and Maidenhead bypass which also acts as a link between the M4, to the south of the town, and the M40 at High Wycombe. The River Thames runs 1/2 mile (800 m) to the east of the town centre, and York Stream, which runs through the town centre, connects to the Thames via a system of disused waterways. The Jubilee River, part of a flood defence scheme, begins above Boulter's Lock nearby.

In the initial plan for the Elizabeth line (then Crossrail), Maidenhead was expected to be the line's western terminus. After consultation, Crossrail Limited and Transport for London decided to extend the line to Reading, which also serves as a major hub for the Great Western route. Some of the stopping services from Paddington to Reading were taken over in 2018 by Crossrail's precursor company, TfL Rail. The full timetable was introduced during the phased opening of the Elizabeth line in 2022.

Two miles to the south-west of the town lies White Waltham Airfield, a base for general aviation and flight training.

== Sport ==
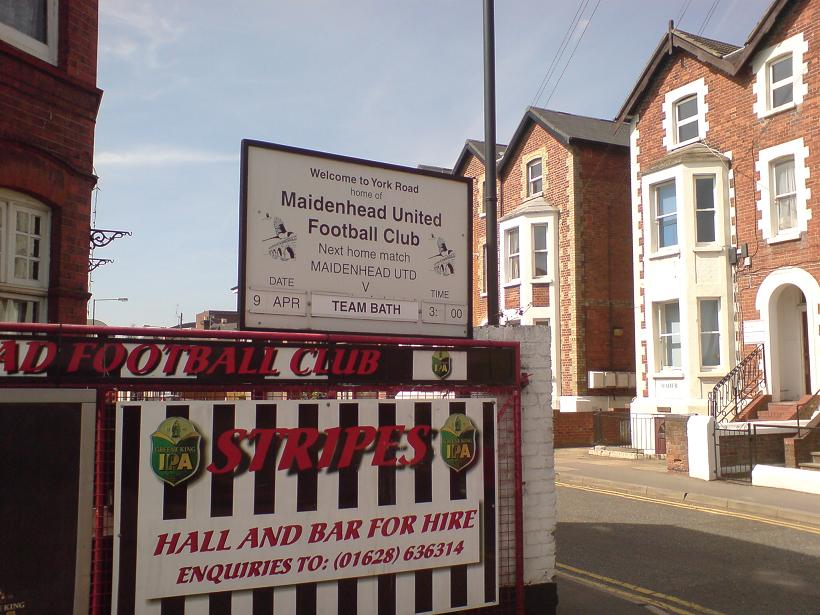
The entrance to York Road, the oldest continuously used senior football ground in the world

Situated on the River Thames, the town is a rowing centre. Maidenhead Rowing Club organises the Maidenhead Regatta which, along with Marlow Regatta and Henley Regatta, is often seen as a testing ground for Olympic rowing athletes. Maidenhead has often seen winners go on to represent the United Kingdom at the Olympic Games. The town's football team, Maidenhead United, play at York Road, which is the oldest football ground in the world continuously used by the same team. Maidenhead United were crowned champions of National League South at the end of the 2016/17 season. Due to this, the team were automatically promoted to the National League (fifth tier of English Football) for the 2017/18 season. The Maidenhead Rugby Club was founded in 1921 and is the largest organised sports team in the town. It consists of four men's teams, a women's team and a large youth programme.

== Media ==
The local newspaper is The Maidenhead Advertiser. Maidenhead has been the home of Maidenhead Citadel Band of the Salvation Army since 1886. The head office of the Commonwealth War Graves Commission is based in Maidenhead on Marlow Road. Furthermore, various private companies have their head offices around the town, including Johnson & Johnson, the American multi-national pharmaceutical. The schools listed below consist of various types of schools including free schools and academies.

== Education ==
=== Further educational institutions ===
- Berkshire College of Agriculture is based in Maidenhead.

Although the town only has the one college, most students entering college level education travel to the various establishments in the area, including the Windsor Forest Colleges Group (formerly East Berkshire College) in both Windsor and Langley, as well as The Henley College and Reading College.

=== Secondary schools ===
- Altwood Church of England School
- Cox Green School
- Desborough College (previously Maidenhead Grammar School)
- Furze Platt Senior School
- Holyport College (state boarding school)
- Newlands Girls' School (previously County High School for Girls, Maidenhead)

=== Primary schools ===
- All Saints C of E Junior School
- Alwyn Infant School
- Courthouse Junior School
- Furze Platt Infant School (caters for Reception – Year 2)
- Furze Platt Junior School (caters for Year 3–6)
- Holyport Primary School
- Larchfield
- Lowbrook Academy
- Oldfield Primary School
- Riverside Primary School
- St Edmund Campion Primary School
- St. Lukes C of E School
- St. Mary's Primary School
- Wessex Primary School
- White Waltham C of E Primary School
- Woodlands Park Primary School

=== Independent schools ===
- Beech Lodge School (co-ed 7–17)
- Claires Court (all-through 3–18:- co-ed nursery [3–5]; girls [4–16] & boys [4–16] in a diamond shape; co-ed sixth form)
- Herries School (co-ed 3–11)
- Highfield School (boys 2–4; girls 2–11)
- St Piran's School (co-ed 3–11)
- Redroofs School for the Performing Arts (co-ed 9–18 full time and all ages for weekly classes)

The closest higher education institution is Buckinghamshire New University in High Wycombe, 14.5 km (9 mi) to the north. The University of Reading and University of West London (Berkshire Institute of Health – Reading) are both approximately 21 km (13 mi) to the south-west.

== Future plans ==
As of 2020, a large new retail and residential development called 'The Landing' is due for construction. This involves demolishing the 1960s Nicholsons shopping centre and replacing it with a new retail and residential quarter built around a network of revived historic streets and a micro brewery. A new town square featuring shops, restaurants and apartments was under construction between the central library and town hall. Additionally, there will be an upgraded railway station and transport interchange, the movement of the leisure centre to Braywick Park, the bowls club relocated to be replaced by apartments and improved links between Kidwells Park and the High Street.

The Chapel Arches retail and residential development is under construction. Part of the scheme involves restoring the old Thames tributaries which run through a historic section of the town centre. The redevelopment will bring an attractive waterfront quarter with new apartments, boutique stores, restaurants, bars, and cafes are to be a feature this new part of the town centre. The adjoining historic section of the High Street around the 18th century Chapel Arches Bridge has been restored as part of the development. Existing Georgian and Victorian buildings have been rejuvenated, and the adjoining new builds have been sensitively constructed in the same historic style to bring back a sense of history and lost heritage to this part of the town centre. Maidenhead was home to the amateur radio conference that agreed on the Maidenhead Locator System standard in 1980. It is in grid square IO91pm. The average house price in Maidenhead in January 2021 was £540,940.

== In literature ==
Maidenhead is briefly mentioned in Jerome K. Jerome's 1889 humorous novel, Three Men in a Boat, although the author made clear he disliked the town.

== Notable people and businesses ==
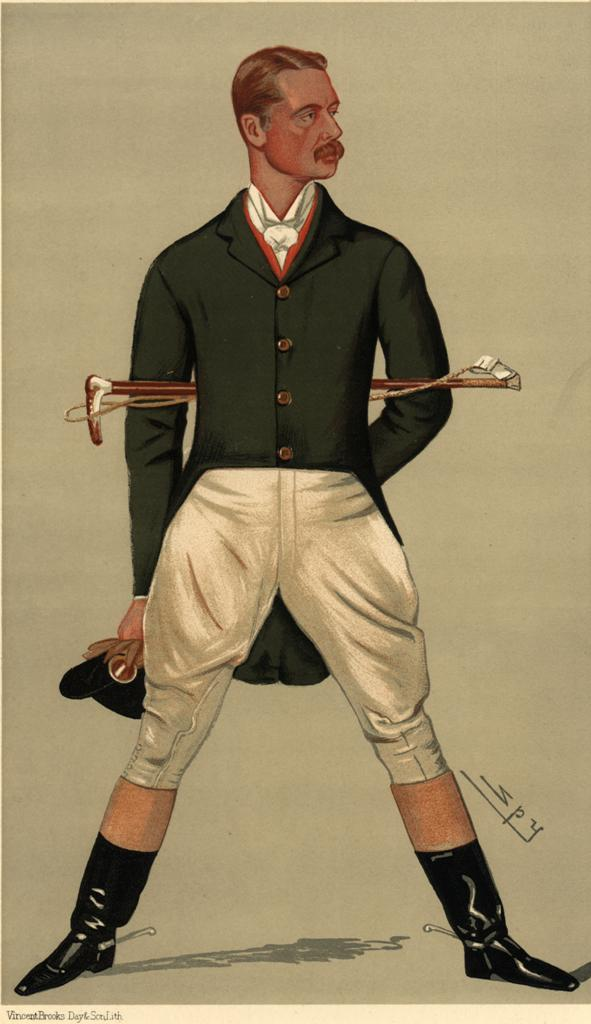
William Grenfell, 1st Baron Desborough was an all round sportsman, politician and public servant who performed many good works for the town.

A number of notable figures can be counted amongst Maidenhead's current and former residents.

- Children's television presenter and radio show host Toby Anstis (b. 1968).
- Wing Commander Clive Beadon (1919–1996) and his second wife, Jane Beadon (1913–1999) lived in Maidenhead from 1994
- The film director brothers Roy (1913–2001) and John Boulting (1913–1985) were born in Bray village on the outskirts of Maidenhead in November 1913.
- Mary Ann Browne (1812–1845) was a British poet and writer of musical scores.
- Edd China (born 1971), an English TV presenter, mechanic, motor specialist and inventor lives and works here.
- The actress Diana Dors (1931–1984) lived for much of her life in the town, in several properties.
- The broadcaster Richard Dimbleby (1913–1965) lived for some time on Boulter's Island.
- English dramatist Sir George Etherege (ca.1636 – ca.1692) was born in Maidenhead.
- The Spice Girls shared a house in Maidenhead for a year preceding their rise to stardom.
- Arthur and Ron Hacker formed the company Hacker Radio Ltd in Maidenhead in 1959, producers of fine transistor radios that for a time in the 1970s earned the Royal Warrant of Appointment
- Essayist and novelist Nick Hornby (b. 1957) was educated at Maidenhead Grammar School (now Desborough School),
- "Dragon" Peter Jones (b. 1966).
- Andy King (born 1988) grew up in Maidenhead, and attended Furze Platt Senior School. He plays for Leicester City and helped them win the Premier League title in 2016.
- Author Hugh Lofting (1886–1947), creator of Doctor Dolittle, was born in Maidenhead.
- Author and broadcaster John O'Farrell (b. 1962).
- Maidenhead's riverside location has also drawn many celebrities, including former broadcaster Michael Parkinson (1935–2023)
- The 18th century mariner Sir Isaac Pocock and his nephew dramatist Isaac Pocock lived in Ray House, Maidenhead.
- Pinkneys Green, a small village near the town, was home to Sir Nicholas Winton (1909–2015), whose heroic efforts rescued 669 Jewish children from Czechoslovakia at the outbreak of World War II. There is a statue of him at Maidenhead railway station.
