= Taplow =

Village in Buckinghamshire, England

Coordinates: 51.531°N 0.687°W

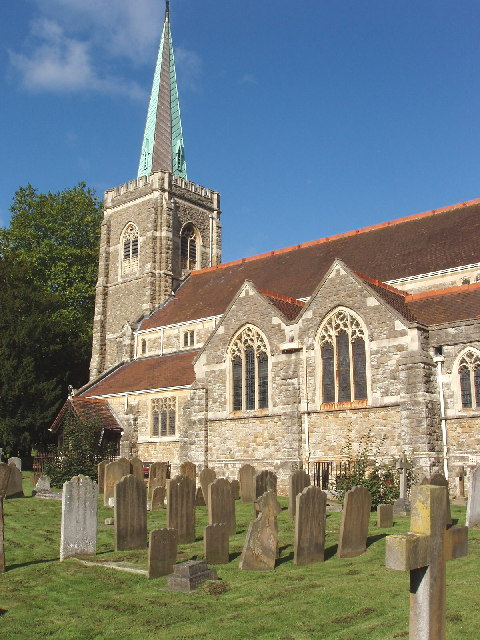
- The mock-medieval parish church of St Nicholas, built in 1911.

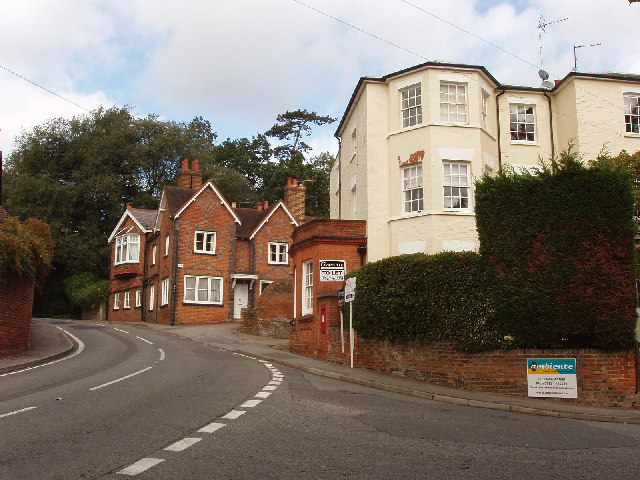
- Berry Hill, part of the developed traditional core

- Location within Buckinghamshire
- Area: 11.22 km^{2} (4.33 sq mi)
- Population: 1,669 (2011 census)
  - Density: 149/km^{2} (390/sq mi)
- OS grid reference: SU9182
- Civil parish: Taplow
- Unitary authority: Buckinghamshire
- Ceremonial county: Buckinghamshire
- Region: South East
- Country: England
- Sovereign state: United Kingdom
- Post town: MAIDENHEAD
- Postcode district: SL6
- Dialling code: 01628
- Police: Thames Valley
- Fire: Buckinghamshire
- Ambulance: South Central
- UK Parliament: Beaconsfield

Taplow is a village and civil parish in Buckinghamshire, England. It sits on the left bank of the River Thames, facing Maidenhead in the neighbouring county of Berkshire, with Cippenham and Burnham to the east. It is the south-westernmost settlement in Buckinghamshire.

The village features a Grade II listed mock-medieval church, the parish church of St Nicholas, as well as a school of the same name. Taplow railway station, on the Great Western Main Line and Elizabeth line, serves the village, with services to London Paddington, Heathrow, through Central London, Reading and Oxford. There are two conservation areas in the parish, the Taplow Village Conservation Area and the Taplow Riverside Conservation Area. Footpaths connect all parts of the parish to Maidenhead Bridge and to Burnham Beeches, a modest, hilly wood marking the start of the Chiltern Hills.

== History ==
The village has a geological Site of Special Scientific Interest, South Lodge Pit, dating to the late Cretaceous.

The village's name is Anglo-Saxon in origin, and means Tæppa's barrow; the Anglo-Saxon burial mound of Tæppa can still be visited, and important artefacts excavated there are now in the British Museum, notably a gold belt buckle. Taplow was recorded in the Domesday Book of 1086 as Thapeslau. Taplow Court nearby is also the site of an early Iron Age hill fort and was the site of the manor house.

William Grenfell, 1st Baron Desborough lived at Taplow Court. Neighbouring is Cliveden, former home and parkland of Nancy Astor in the parish. Both aspects of Cliveden are today open under the National Trust scheme though part of the main building is used as a hotel for visiting dignitaries to the UK.

In 1883 a number of important Anglo-Saxon royal grave goods were discovered, reflecting similar discoveries in Prittlewell, Broomfield, and Sutton Hoo. Though the overall collection is less than that from the ship-burial in Mound 1 at Sutton Hoo, many individual objects are closely comparable and of similar quality.

The church of St Nicholas was built in 1911 but includes one of the earliest surviving brass memorials to a civilian in England, made in about 1350, which would place it during the Black Death.

== Demography ==
Taplow compared
2001 UK Census	Taplow ward	South Bucks borough	England
Population	1,584	61,945	49,138,831
Foreign born	14.9%	12.2%	9.2%
White	96.1%	93.4%	90.9%
Asian	2.3%	4.5%	4.6%
Black	0.0%	0.4%	2.3%
Christian	73.4%	75.6%	71.7%
Muslim	0.4%	1.1%	3.1%
Hindu	0.8%	1.2%	1.16
No religion	17.1%	12.5%	14.6%
Unemployed	1.3%	1.9%	3.3%
Retired	12.7%	14.8%	13.5%

At the 2011 UK census, the Taplow electoral ward had a population of 1,669. The ethnicity was 92.5% white, 1.0% mixed race, 5.0% Asian, 0.8% black and 0.7% other. The place of birth of residents was 85.1% United Kingdom, 1% Republic of Ireland, 4.6% other Western European countries, and 9.3% elsewhere. Religion was recorded as 64.1% Christian, 1.6% Buddhist, 0.5% Hindu, 1.6% Sikh, 0.3% Jewish, and 1.3% Muslim. 24.1% were recorded as having no religion, 0% had an alternative religion and 5.9% did not state their religion.

The economic activity of residents aged 16–74 was 46.8% in full-time employment, 8.7% in part-time employment, 16.7% self-employed, 1.3% unemployed, 0.9% students with jobs, 2.5% students without jobs, 12.7% retired, 6.2% looking after home or family, 1.7% permanently sick or disabled and 2.7% economically inactive for other reasons. The industry of employment of residents was 12.3% retail, 11.8% manufacturing, 4.5% construction, 24.6% real estate, 7.8% health and social work, 5.7% education, 9.1% transport and communications, 2.7% public administration, 6.7% hotels and restaurants, 2.7% finance, 3% agriculture and 9.1% other. Compared with national figures, the ward had a relatively high proportion of workers in agriculture and real estate. According to Office for National Statistics estimates, during the period of April 2001 to March 2002 the average gross weekly income of households was £840, compared with an average of £660 in South East England. Of the ward's residents aged 16–74, 37.2% had a higher education qualification or the equivalent, compared with 19.9% nationwide.

2011 Published Statistics: Population, home ownership and extracts from Physical Environment, surveyed in 2005
Output area	Homes owned outright	Owned with a loan	Socially rented	Privately rented	Other	km^{2} roads	km^{2} water	km^{2} domestic gardens	km^{2} domestic buildings	km^{2} non-domestic buildings	Usual residents	km^{2}
Civil parish	353	244	28	139	19	0.258	0.494	0.421	0.087	0.086	1669	11.22

== Sports ==
The village's football club, Taplow United F.C., play in the Hellenic Football League. The village cricket club is located on the Cliveden Road and the rugby union side, Phoenix RFC, is located on Institute Road near the railway station.

== Notable people ==
- Pascoe Grenfell (1761–1838), businessman and politician
- Brion Gysin (1916–1986), artist, was born in Taplow.
- Wilfred Greatorex (1921–2002), screenwriter, script editor and television producer, lived in Taplow
- Anthony Read (1935–2015), television producer, screenwriter, script editor and author, lived in Taplow
- Terry Wogan (1938–2016), television and radio presenter, lived in Hitcham (Taplow)
- Tom Dean (born 2000), swimmer and 2020 Olympic Gold medallist in 200m freestyle, lives with his family in Taplow
- Dusty Springfield (1939–1999), singer and record producer, lived in Taplow
- Richard Sanderson (1953– ), singer and composer
- Andrew Wakefield (1956– ), British fraudster, former doctor, and anti-vaccine activist
